= 1559–1562 French political crisis =

French political and religious crisis

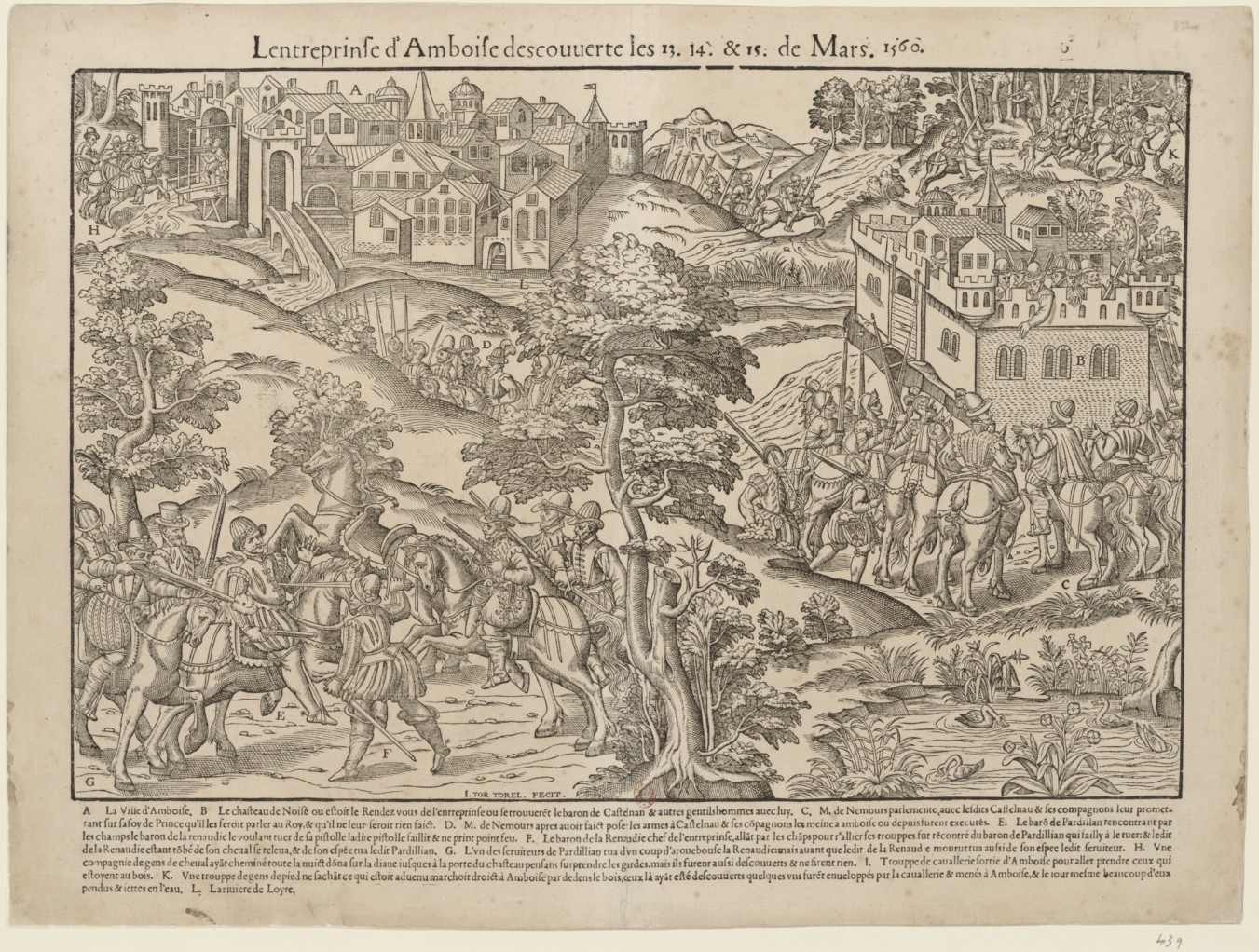
The Conspiracy of Amboise which dramatically destabilised the government of François II and led to violent actions across the kingdom

The 1559–1562 French political crisis was induced by the sudden death of the King Henri II (otherwise known as Henry II) in July 1559. With his death, the throne fell to François II (otherwise known as Francis II) who though not a minor, lacked the ability to command authority due to his young age. Actual power fell to two of Henri II's favourites, the duke of Guise (French: duc de Guise), François and the cardinal of Lorraine (French: cardinal de Lorraine), Charles who quickly moved to assert a monopoly of their authority over the administration of the kingdom. Royal patronage would flow to them and their clients, with those of their rival, Constable Montmorency quickly starved of royal favour. Having been left with ruinous debts by Henri, they undertook a campaign of aggressive austerity which further alienated many grandees and soldiers who were not shielded from its effects (as the clients of the Lorraine brothers were). They also continued the persecution of Protestantism that had transpired under Henri II, though with the young François on the throne the Protestants felt emboldened to resist.

To this end aggrieved Protestants and political opponents of the Lorraine brothers administration formulated a conspiracy to assume control of the king and end the Lorraine administration. This manifested in an attempted conspiracy at Amboise in March 1560. Guise and Lorraine were able to suppress the conspiracy, crushing it brutally. They suspected that the Protestant prince du sang (prince of the blood) prince de Condé was the architect of the conspiracy, and Condé thus departed from court shortly after the conspiracy under a cloud of suspicion. He joined with his brother, the premier prince du sang the king of Navarre at Navarre's southern court of Nérac and the two spent the summer plotting against the crown. While Amboise had been suppressed at the court, its aftershocks continued to be felt across France, with various disorders, particularly in the south of France. The Lorraine administration attempted to crush the embers of the revolt. At the same time they abandoned the persecutory policy of Henri II and differentiated 'heresy' from 'sedition' for the first time. An Assembly of Notables was called to advise on the kingdom's problems in August and it resolved on the convoking of an Estates General and a national church council. At the assembly, Montmorency's nephew Admiral Coligny established himself as a leading voice of the Protestants, representing several of their petitions, much to the annoyance of the Lorraine government. Navarre and Condé were absent from the meeting and after further evidence of their involvement in an attempted coup at Lyon was uncovered they were summoned to the court. They arrived in October for the upcoming Estates General and Condé was arrested for treason. Shortly before the Estates General could meet in December, the young king François died, ending the Lorraine government.

Catherine de' Medici, the young king's mother, moved to the centre of the political stage as de facto regent for her second son Charles IX. To assume this position she negotiated with Navarre, who as premier prince du sang had a right to the regency. He was bought out of the position in return for the release of his brother Condé from captivity, the position of lieutenant-general of the kingdom and several other concessions. The new administration decided to go further than the Lorraine government in moving towards implicit toleration of Protestantism. In opposition to their alienation from the government and the toleration of Protestantism, Guise, Montmorency and another favourite of Henri II, Marshal Saint-André entered into an agreement in April 1561 that has become known to history as the 'Triumvirate'. They agreed to support the preservation of Catholicism and support one another during the current political crisis. 1561 was a major year of growth for Protestantism, and the Protestants became increasingly bold as they saw favour from the crown. As a result, there was much disorder in the kingdom throughout late 1561, particularly in the south of the kingdom, where a state of civil war emerged between Protestants and Catholics. The crown attempted to pacify these troubles with further religious edicts that continued to wind down the persecution of Protestantism without legalising the religion explicitly, however these failed. In late 1561 the colloquy of Poissy attempted to achieve a religious synthesis between Protestantism and Catholicism, however it devolved into acrimony and in the wake of this failure, Guise, Lorraine and many of the other grandees departed from court in October. Around this time there was also an attempt to kidnap Catherine's third son the duc d'Orléans. By the beginning of 1562 Catherine, and her chancellor Michel de L'Hôpital had resolved that formal toleration of Protestantism would be necessary to sooth the troubles in the kingdom, and to this end published the Edict of Saint-Germain on 17 January. The publishing of the edict finished the alienation of the lieutenant-general Navarre from the government of which he was part, and he aligned himself with the 'Triumvirate'. He summoned Guise to come to court and aid in the opposition to the edict. Guise was at this time at Saverne meeting with the duke of Wűrttemberg and upon his return he perpetrated the massacre of Wassy, which shortly preceded the outbreak of the first French War of Religion.

== Peace of Cateau-Cambrésis ==
=== Death of Henri II ===
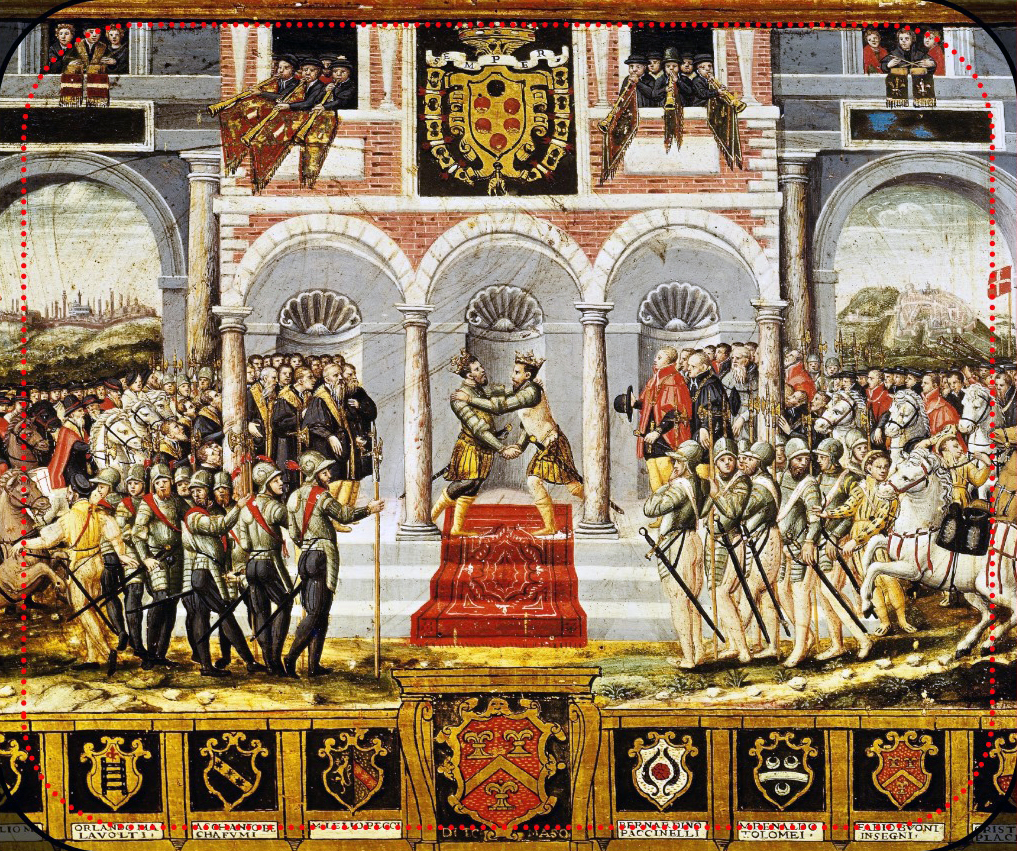
Philip II of Spain and Henri II of France embrace for the signing of the Peace of Cateau-Cambrésis

The end of the war with Spain radically changed the distributed of the French gendarmerie, which had in the years of war been concentrated on the frontiers. With compagnies d'ordonnances (ordinance companies) returning to their home provinces, this put at the disposal of the provincial governors a large military force that they had not enjoyed for generations. In prior years, king Henri had declared that not even the king of Navarre was to enjoy an armed guard. Now, all provincial governors had at their disposal hundreds of armed veterans, who travelled with them as large entourages.

The establishment of the Peace of Cateau-Cambrésis in April 1559 allowed the French monarchy to turn its attention to domestic Protestant 'heresy'. Indeed, in a court increasingly riven by factionalism between the constable de Montmorency and the king's mistress Diane de Poitiers on the one hand and on the other the house of Lorraine as represented by the duc de Guise and the cardinal de Lorraine the crushing of Protestant heresy was the only point upon which unity existed.

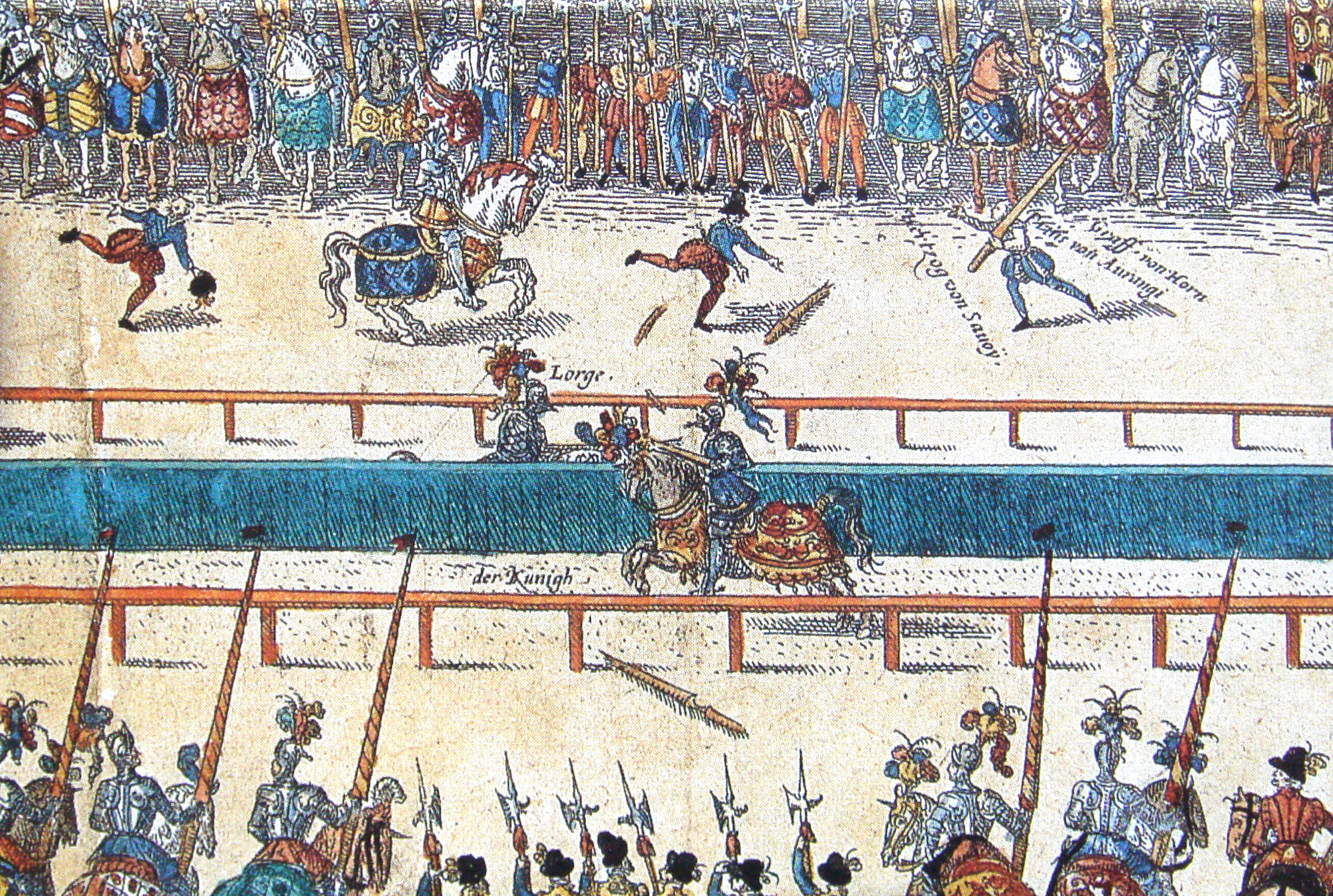
Fatal joust of Henri II and the comte de Montgommery

To celebrate the establishment of the peace, and the two marriages contained in its terms (that of Henri's daughter Élisabeth to Philip II of Spain and Henri's sister Marguerite to the duke of Savoy), Henri decided to host a tournament. Henri was an accomplished rider and therefore participated in the jousts (wearing the colours of his mistress Diane - black and white). He successfully rode against the duke of Ferrara, the duc de Guise (duke of Guise) and duc de Nemours before having an indecisive run against the comte de Montgommery (count of Montgommery) captain of his Garde écossaise (Scottish Guard). With the run having lacked a decisive victory, Henri demanded another pass with the reluctant Montgommery, despite the urgings of his wife Catherine. In their second run, Montgommery's lance pierced Henri's visor embedding a shard of wood in his eye. Henri was hurriedly carried to the palais des Tournelles where despite medical attention he died on 10 July. In his final hours, Catherine ensured that Diane was afforded no access to her lovers bedside, and she further kept Montmorency away when her husband was unconscious, though on regaining consciousness Henri would insist on the Constable's return.

Protestants saw the death of their hated persecutor as a sign of divine justice. As their pamphleteers were quick to observe, the very eye with which Henri had vowed to see the Protestant parlementaire (member of the French sovereign court) Anne du Bourg burn had been pierced with a lance. This death brought France into a serious political crisis. In the estimation of Garrisson, it is at this point, and not the 1562 Massacre of Wassy, that the rupture between the noble factions can be observed.

=== Ascent of François II ===
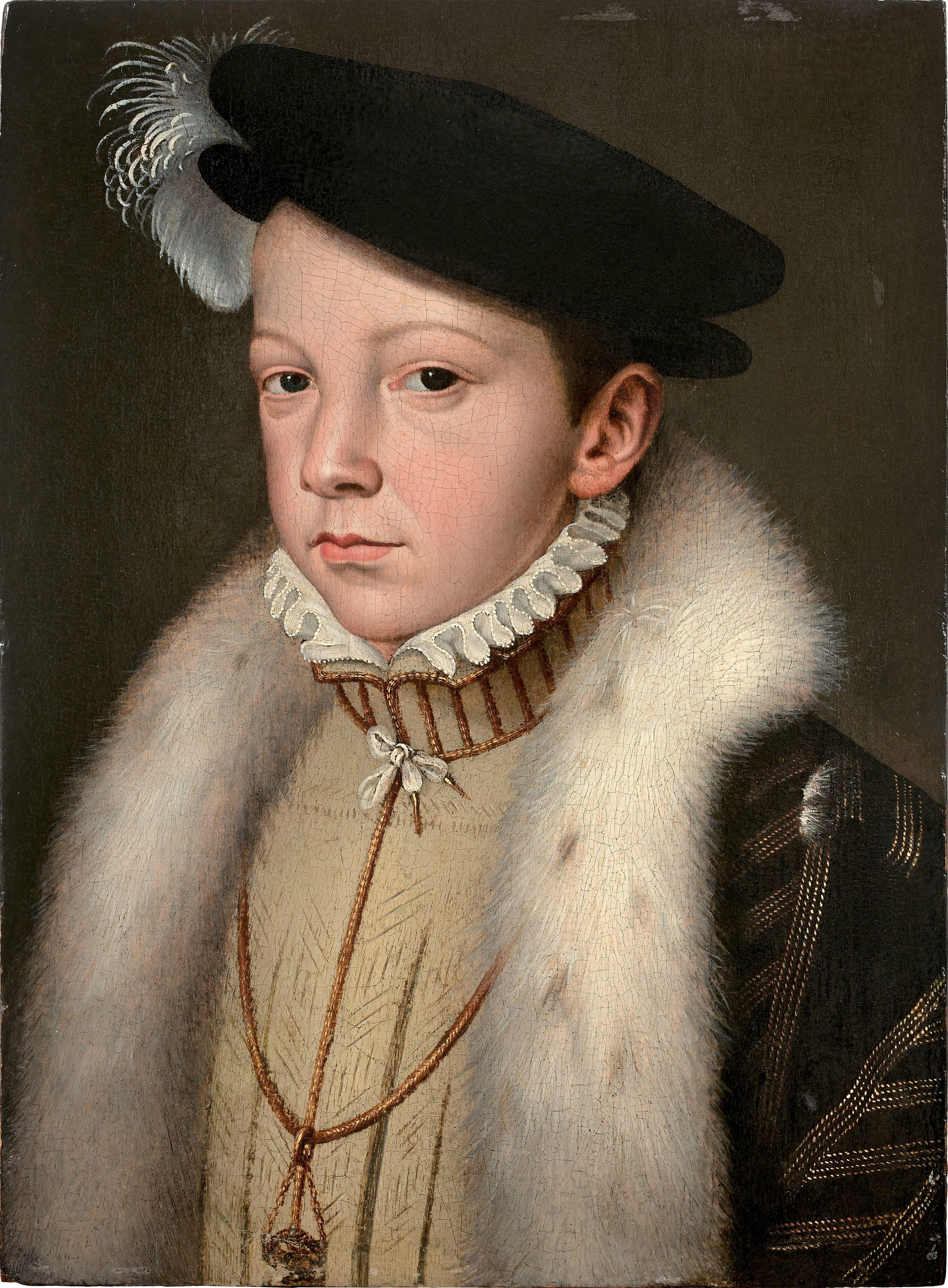
François II, king of France 1559-1560

With Henri dead, his young son François ascended to the throne as François II. François, though legally of the age to rule, lacked maturity and experience. He was also racked by illness and therefore actual decision making fell to those around him. In the estimation of Le Roux the apparatus of the French state had insufficient strength to operate without a strong king at its centre. The Lorraine brothers had been in discussions with the king's mother Catherine during the final days of Henri II's life and she had assented to them assuming control of François' government. Devastated by the passing of her husband she had little appetite for taking the reins of power herself. Therefore, at the recommendation of his mother, the young king looked to his wife's uncles the duc de Guise and cardinal de Lorraine to lead his administration.

A palace revolution quickly followed, with the Montmorency family pushed from their ascendency alongside the king's mistress Diane de Poitiers. The court was moved from the Tournelles to the Louvre, where the duc de Guise and cardinal de Lorraine assumed control of the apartments that Montmorency and Diane had previously enjoyed the use of. The palace revolution was not however comparable with that which had accompanied the ascent of Henri II to the throne in 1547. The ouster of Diane de Poitiers allowed the Guise to restore the chancellor of France, François Olivier to his charge that he had been denied the exercise of his charge during Diane's ascendency. Olivier had an unimpeachable reputation and the Lorraine brothers hoped to be advantaged by this - while making the chancellor dependant on them. Diane's chancellor Jean Bertrand was therefore disgraced. Diane was compelled to surrender the château de Chenonceaux (in return for Chaumont) and the crown jewels she had received from the late king. The disgrace of Diane was an olive branch of the Lorraine family to Catherine, as though Catherine held considerable antipathy for Diane the former favourite's daughter was married to Guise's brother the duc d'Aumale. As a result, Aumale had protested against her disgrace. While Diane and her daughter the duchesse de Bouillon were exiled from the court, Aumale's wife the duchesse d'Aumale was permitted to remain.

The king's seal, which Montmorency had held, was taken from him while he was still doing his duty to guard the body of the late king. It was transferred to Lorraine. Montmorency further surrendered his charge of grand maître (grand master), but was allowed to maintain the office of Constable and the governorship of Languedoc. The charge of grand maître was one of the most prestigious in the king's household, it granted its holder authority over all the nobles of the court. The charge was removed from him on the pretext of his old age (he was 67). The charge of Constable made Montmorency the de facto head of the French military. Guise assumed the office of grand maître sometime between 14 and 17 November and the English ambassador observed him exercising the role on 3 December. In further consolation to Montmorency, in return for relinquishing the great office of the crown, he received the promotion of his eldest son François to the Marshalate in January 1560.

It was rumoured that the Lorraine administration also desired to dispossess Montmorency's nephew the seigneur d'Andelot of his charge as colonel-general of the French infantry, providing it to the comte de La Rochefoucauld (who would go on to marry the Protestant Charlotte de Roye, sister of the princesse de Condé), however this did not come to pass. Guise made a further acquisition with the surrendering of the office of grand chambellan (another great office of the crown) by their kinsmen the duc de Longueville in his favour. Longueville had been betrothed to Guise's daughter Catherine in January of that year, her dowry offset by the ducs support for payments of Longueville's ransom. The office of grand chambellan combined with the office of grand maître gave the duc de Guise a great control over the royal household.

The Bourbon princes du sang (princes of the blood - descendants of the French royal line outside the immediate family) also found themselves on the outside of the new administration. This was a reflection of the treason of their kinsmen the Constable de Bourbon in decades previous. In the senior Bourbon-Vendôme branch, the king of Navarre (who was also the count of Foix and the other Albret lands through his marriage to the queen of Navarre) premier prince du sang - nearest agnatic relative to the king outside the immediate royal family - was away in distant Guyenne. He was informed by Guise of the new Lorraine administration in a letter, the act being presented as a fait accompli. His younger brother the prince de Condé who was present at court was dispatched for a role in the ratification of the peace of Cateau-Cambrésis which allowed for his temporary removal from court to head to the Netherlands. Condé lacked the resources of some of the other great grandees and financially damaged himself on this mission in service of presenting himself suitably for his rank before the Spanish king Philip in Ghent. He had been granted 1,000 écus (crowns) for the mission by the cardinal de Lorraine, which proved insufficient. By contrast in January 1560, Condé was gifted 70,000 livres by the king. The junior branch of princes du sang, the Bourbon-Montpensier, comprised by the duc de Montpensier and the prince de La Roche-sur-Yon contented themselves with quiet enrichment while avoiding a major political role in the new administration. Montpensier received a sum of 1,500 livres from the crown for services he had rendered during Henri's reign. In Durot's estimation the amount was intended to be an insulting political retirement for the prince. The Lorraine brothers were fearful of a Bourbon coup aimed at asserting the right of the princes du sang to the government of France, and to this end when they departed the Tournelles on 10 July after the death of the king, they ensured they were surrounded by their political allies, the duke of Ferrara and the duc de Nemours.

The seigneur de Saint-André, Marshal of France, governor of the Lyonnais and former favourite of Henri II, kept himself on good terms with everyone and therefore was able to adapt to the ascendency of the Lorraine brothers in the new administration. To this end he proposed a marriage between his daughter Catherine and one of the sons of the duc de Guise. Though this marriage proposal came to nothing he enjoyed good relations with the government, and was rewarded for his friendship. In April 1560 he received a gift of 13,000 livres, with a further 6,000 in the Autumn.

The government of the duc de Guise and cardinal de Lorraine would dominate the young king's short reign. Guise took charge of the military affairs of the administration, leaving finance, justice and diplomacy to his brother Lorraine. The two Lorraine princes ensured that they always maintained physical proximity to François, with the duc de Guise no longer putting himself at the head of the army or going to inspect border fortifications. As such the Lorraine princes' the brothers served as their representatives for the Scottish expedition and Papal Conclave respectively.

Though the royal councils would be maintained, important decisions were agreed upon by Lorraine and Guise prior to their convention, as a result the grandees on the council rarely attended and were rarely referenced in its decrees. Among those who would attend would be marshal Saint-André, the duc de Montpensier, cardinal de Châtillon and cardinal de Bourbon. Lorraine and Guise were themselves largely absent from the councils, not finding attendance necessary for the execution of their policy. This held true for the king too, and it would sometimes be the case that the deliberations were in an entirely different town to where he was residing, as when he was Saint-Germain-en-Laye while council was being taken in Pontoise. According to Durot, by the suppression of the importance of the royal council, the Lorraine administration risked the possibility of damaging the legitimacy of the crown.

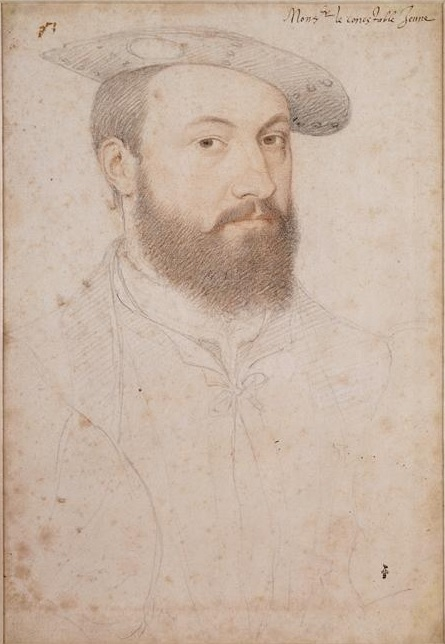
Anne de Montmorency, favourite of François I and Henri II

When called into the king's presence in council on 11 July François announced to Montmorency the division of government between the duc de Guise and cardinal de Lorraine to him. Their word was to be obeyed as if it was the word of François himself, the young king said. François highlighted that the Constable's old age would make it difficult for him to continue governing. The Constable, who was with his sons and nephews for the reception was assured that neither his children nor his nephews would be dispossessed of their charges as the king had need of them. Conscious of his need to save face, Montmorency informed François that he had only come to the king to ask for permission to retire from the court. Having received such a cold reception, Montmorency resolved to retire from court to his estates at Chantilly, resigning himself to a lack of control over the government. He departed to Chantilly after the burial of Henri II (which was undertaken at Saint-Denis on 12 August) with a grand retinue of such size as to make the king's appear small. He remained powerful, enjoying his position at the centre of a large web of patronage from his courtly exile. It was indeed this great power that made it difficult for him or his family to be comprehensively disgraced.

Conscious that their assumption of power could be faced with much opposition, hundreds of loyal nobles were brought into the capital at this time by the new Lorraine government. This was to prepare them for any eventuality, among which the possibility of a military counterstroke by the eldest son of Montmorency, the comte de Dammartin, governor of the Île de France was a possibility. However, none came, and Montmorency allowed himself to be pushed aside.

=== Opposition ===
For those opposed to the rise of the Lorraine administration, the 'foreigness' of the Lorraine princes was a tool that could be used against them. This was despite the fact the family had been naturalised as French during the lifetime of their father the first duc de Guise in 1506. Supporters of the Bourbons in this period mockingly noted that the first duc de Guise spoke French with a 'German accent'. Keen to quiet such attacks on Guise and his family, Henri II had raised Joinville to a principality in 1552. Upon the marriage of Marie Stuart (their niece) and the young François, Lorraine was delighted that henceforth 'no one could call them foreign princes'. In addition to being the uncle of the young queen the second duc de Guise was married to Anne d'Este a granddaughter of Louis XII. Though they were linked to the French royal family in several ways they were descended from the house of Lorraine. Thus it was argued by some that their administration was a usurpation of the rights that naturally belonged to the princes du sang, chief among them the king of Navarre.

The 'foreignness' of the Lorraines was a considerable boon to the Protestant cause. Persecution against them undertaken during the reign of Henri II could not have its legitimacy challenged, however when the persecution was overseen by 'foreign' princes who had 'usurped authority', it could therefore be argued their policy was illegal and it was legitimate to resist.

Early in the reign of François II in 1559 there were two notable libels published against their government: the livret de Strasbourg and the mémoire d'Octobre. The former was likely the work of the fervently Protestant François Hotman, who operated out of Strasbourg. The latter's authentic publication is disputed, but it is an anonymous work preserved in the writings of the contemporary historians de Thou and La Place. Both texts emphasised that the Lorraine administration was a tyrannical usurpation. According to the pamphleteers power rightfully belonged with the princes du sang until such time as François was 'truly of age' to rule. The latter text adds an argument that because the government comprised those who had 'submitted to the Pope' (i.e. cardinal de Lorraine) it was illegitimate as this violated the constitution of the kingdom. This was the only reference to religious matters in a pamphlet largely devoted to political and constitutional questions. By this means the pamphlets looked to make opposition to the Lorraine regime appear as more than as the product of Protestant 'heresy'. A common feature of both libels was that as the Lorraines were foreign princes they could not exercise authority over the kingdom. A narrative followed in which the Guise role in overturning the Truce of Vaucelles in 1556, seizing Napoli in 1557 'exhausted the military' in such a way as to make the defeat of Saint-Quentin possible. As a result of their transgressions, the pamphlet argued the king was forced into a dishonourable peace in 1559. The libels did not however make a case for violent resistance to their government, trusting in the laws of the kingdom to rectify the situation.

Other Protestant libels also made direct attacks on the king. In late 1559, it was thus alleged that 'François bathed in the blood of children to restore his health.’

Those excluded from authority in the new configuration quickly identified one another. Constable Montmorency, who had been by the king's bedside in his final days urged the Bourbon king of Navarre to hurry to court so they could present a united front. To this end he wrote to Navarre the day after the death of Henri. Navarre distrusted this appeal, Montmorency having done little to represent his interests at the Peace of Cateau-Cambrésis. Some of those around him assiduously reinforced this, reminding him often of Montmorency's failure to do so. Nevertheless, having consulted with his advisers (among them his chancellor Aymery Bouchard and the comte d'Escars), he departed from his court at Nérac and came north with his younger brother the prince de Condé. Navarre's cousin, the prince de La Roche-sur-Yon, succeeded in convincing him to pause his journey northwards at Vendôme on 31 July, where those opposed to the Lorraine government had gathered. He would stay in Vendôme for the next two weeks, where he was urged to assert his rights to the regency. Present in Vendôme for this conference of the opposition were Navarre, Condé (who had returned from Ghent), the comte de La Rochefoucauld, the prince de Porcien and the vidame de Chartres. Also present were a secretary of Montmorency's and the Constable's nephews, the three Châtillon brothers (Admiral Coligny, D'Andelot and Cardinal Châtillon). Coligny had many clients in Normandy, while d'Andelot had a network in Brittany. D'Andelot was already a declared Protestant and was among those who feared the recent persecutory edict of Écouen.

The group of malcontents could not agree on strategy, some favouring a military confrontation with the Lorraine government, some an alliance with the young king's mother Catherine de' Medici. It was said that Condé, La Rochefoucauld, Porcien and the vidame de Chartres supported an immediate rebellion, with Condé the most vociferous towards this course. The Constable's secretary and Coligny favoured protesting the Guise administration to the king and negotiating with Catherine. The only true agreement established at the meeting was to end the feud between the Bourbon-Montpensier and Montmorency. The feud had begun in 1547 with a duel between La Roche-sur-Yon and d'Andelot. Some Protestant ministers who were present for the conference urged Navarre to end 'idolatry' at the court. Navarre conducted a secret meeting with a representative of the English ambassador named Killigrew on 8 August. This was reported to the court. Navarre departed Vendôme on 14 August. As his party neared court it slowly fractured and drifted away, as such by the time Navarre arrived on 18 August he had with him only a small party.

Navarre found few accommodations at court, and had to rely on the Marshal de Saint-André to lodge him as Guise and Lorraine had prepared nothing for him. He was not alerted to council meetings when they transpired. When granted an audience with the young king after several days, Navarre was informed that François had entrusted the conduct of his affairs to his wife's uncles and that he expected his subjects to obey them. François informed the king of Navarre that he was concerned about the growth of Protestant heresy. Navarre protested to François that the king could trust in his orthodoxy, to which the king responded that this was a good thing as he would tolerate no deviation from orthodoxy. Navarre would be granted access to the royal council, but would not form part of its innermost decision-making body the conseil des affaires. At this time, two of his own advisers, the comte d'Escars and bishop of Mende worked him over in favour of acceding to a peripheral role in the court. Another noble of his network the seigneur de Jarnac, governor of Poitou deserted him and offered his services to Navarre's enemies.

He was subsequently removed from court by accepting a prestigious mission to accompany the king's sister Élisabeth to Spain to be united with her new husband Philip II. By accepting this task, Navarre hoped Philip might be favourable to the restitution of his kingdom of Navarre, which had largely been conquered by the Spanish in 1513. He had the support of the French crown in this endeavour, François having written a long letter to the Spanish king asking him to make territorial concessions to Navarre. Carpi characterises this as his overarching political goal during this period. The transfer of the princess to her Spanish husband was undertaken in the first days of January 1560. There were various disputes over precedence during the hand-over, and the Spanish were contemptuous of Navarre. The Protestant preacher La Roche-Chandieu doubted the efforts to put Navarre at the head of an opposition. His brother Condé likewise bemoaned how Navarre had allowed himself to be removed from the centre of power for this mission. François de Morel, a Protestant pastor who had been at Vendôme wrote furiously to Calvin on 15 August decrying Navarre as a 'coward' and a 'fool' for his failure to 'do his duty'. He asked Calvin whether it was truly only Navarre who had the right to demand a meeting of the Estates General, or could they themselves resist tyranny by violent means if Navarre failed. Sutherland suggests that this indicates Calvin was not entirely adverse to violent action. Walzer argues that Calvin was open to resistance up to tyrannicide when the initiative for the action was in the name of god.

=== Lorraine administration ===
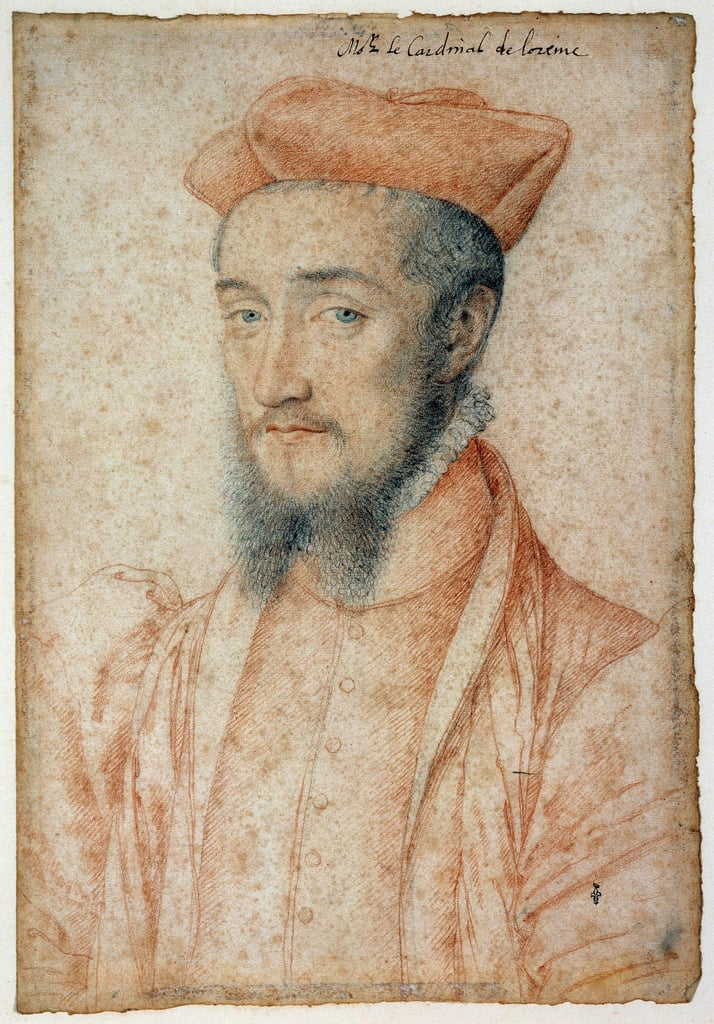
Cardinal de Lorraine

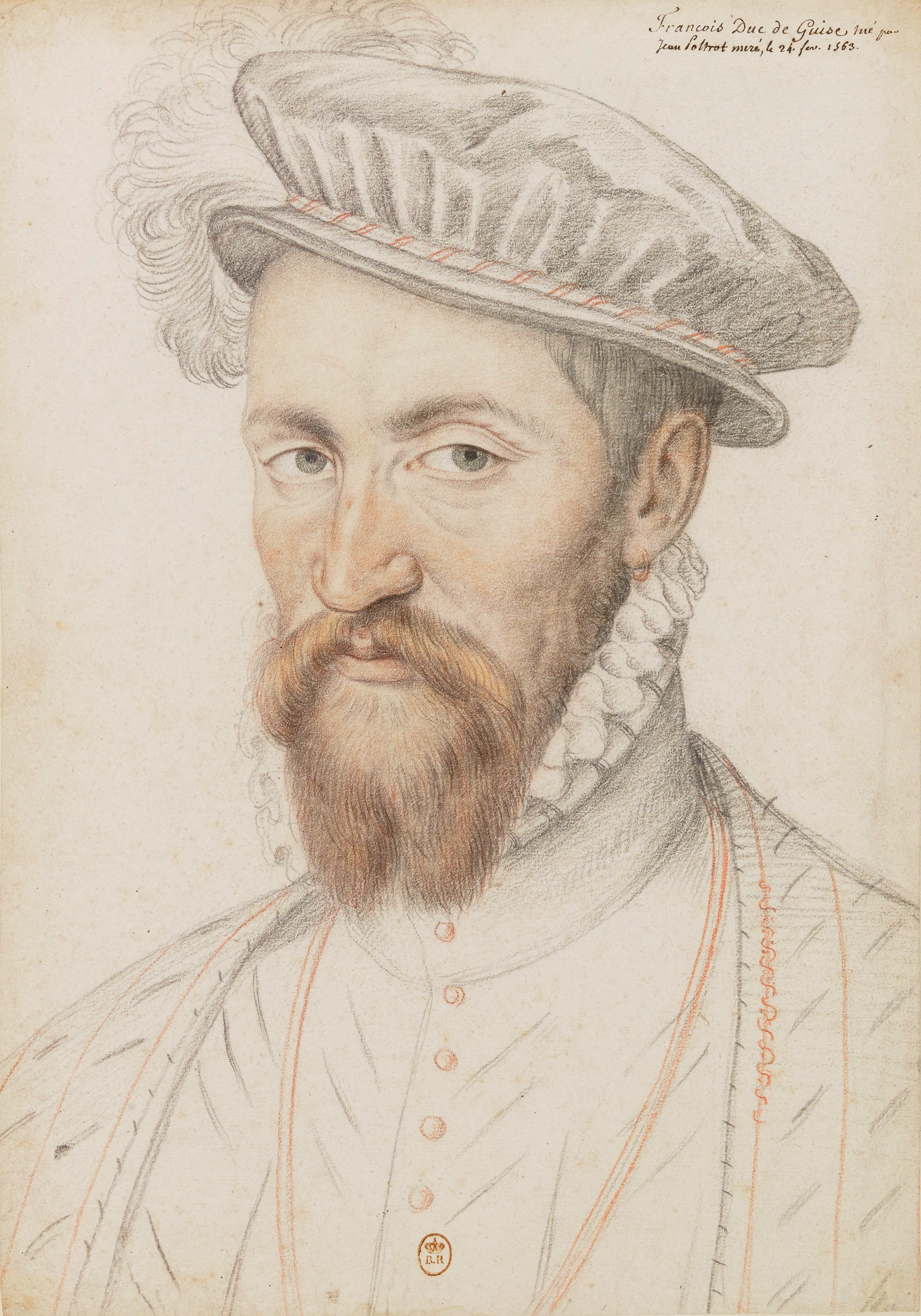
Duc de Guise

When the royal secrétaires d'État (secretaries of state) reported to the young king, François informed them to direct their business to Catherine. In practice however this meant they would report to the Lorraine brothers. Many letters that were addressed to the king were accompanied by longer letters addressed directly to the brothers. Upon the death of the secrétaire d'État du Thier shortly into the new administration around March 1560, the Lorraine brothers selected the seigneur d'Alluye to replace him. Alluye, and his cousin the seigneur de Fresne, who was also a secrétaire d'État, were both firmly Catholic, and had sympathies with the Lorraine faction at court. Sutherland argues this private affiliation did not influence the policy they pursued in their official capacity. The secrétaire L'Aubespine affiliated himself with Catherine.

The registers of the secrétaires would reflect the domination of the court now enjoyed by the Lorraine family. Royal patronage flowed to the family and their clients, and dried up for clients of Montmorency and Diane. Indeed 74% of royal gifts in 1560 would go to the clients of Guise and Lorraine while for Montmorency the figure fell to 0%. As a result of this many nobles sought to ingratiate themselves as clients of the Lorraine family. Among the nobles who turned to the Lorraines was the governor of Berry, who had formerly been in Montmorency's patronage network.

In the 1559 promotions for the royal Ordre de Saint-Michel (Order of Saint-Michel - the highest French chivalric order) the Lorraine government inducted Philip II of Spain and the duke of Savoy. In addition to these grand foreign appointments, they rewarded those close to them. Their brother, the grand prieur received the award, in as well as one of Guise's companions-in-arms from the latter Italian Wars.

Picardy became a pawn in the factional struggles that engulfed the crown during the reign of François II. In January 1560 Coligny, nephew of the Constable was ousted from the governorship of Picardy in favour of the comte de Brissac. Coligny had been frustrated at the Lorraine administration’s refusal to fund the rebuilding of the fortifications of Calais and Saint-Quentin. The person responsible for his displacement is variously ascribed to Guise (on the grounds that Brissac was a more reliable Catholic), and to Catherine (Brissac was a reliable servant of the crown). Guise had appreciated Brissac's commitment to the Italian wars in the previous years. Back in July 1559, the idea of Coligny's replacement with Condé had been floated, it is thus possible Coligny might have acceded to his ouster on this understanding. Guise certainly saw advantage in the implication, and let it be known to Coligny that Condé was replacing him. On the subject of his ouster, Coligny opined to D'Humières that he was unable to handle the joint responsibilities of governor and admiral, and thus his departure was not compelled. If it had been intended to provide the governate to Condé, this proposal was abandoned after the conspiracy of Amboise and the governate was invested in Brissac at the end of March 1560. Brissac at first refused, pleading that he was too old for such a charge. Nevertheless, he would accede to the responsibility. Durot speculates his initial refusal may have been from fear that accepting the governorship would leave him too dependant on the Guise government.

François undertook his coronation at Reims on 18 September 1559. Durot notes that the coronation was a hurried ceremony that lacked much in the way of pomp. This was due to the Lorraine brothers desire to quickly assure themselves that the king was consecrated. The cardinal de Lorraine crowned the young king. Navarre stood in for the role traditionally occupied by the duc de Burgundy during the coronation ceremony (the most senior of the peers), flattering his sensibilities. He did not object, when his cousin the duc de Montpensier was made to give way in the ceremony to the duc de Nevers. Nevers was not a prince du sang unlike Montpensier. However this action was taken because Nevers had been elevated to the duché pairie (ducal-peerage) a month prior to Montpensier.

Much of the policy of the reign of François II would be in continuity with that established by Henri II during early 1559.

=== Legacy of war ===
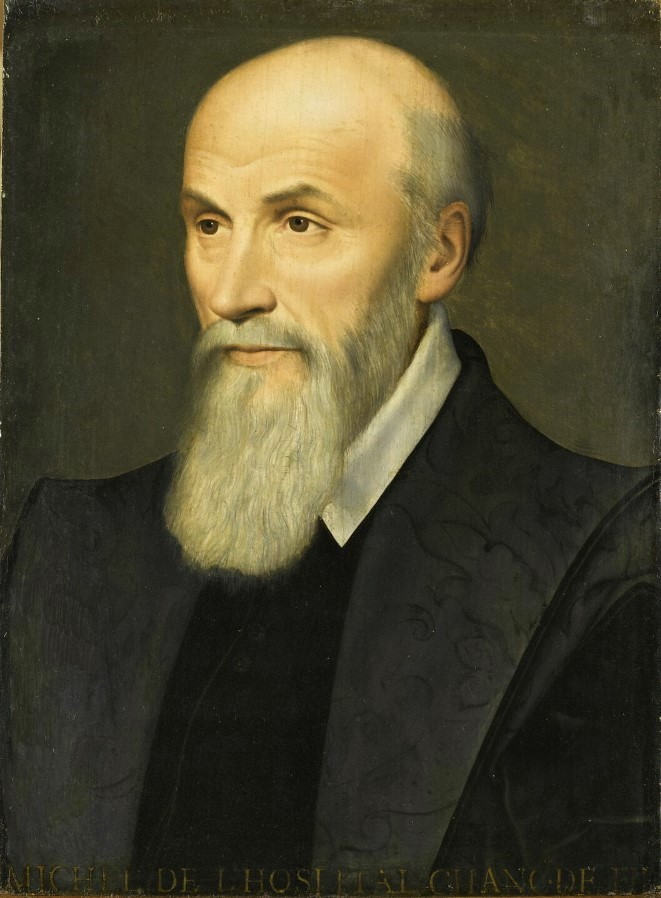
L'Hôpital, premier président of the chambre des comptes and subsequently chancellor of France

The new administration was faced with the large debts which had in part driven Henri to endorse the peace of Cateau-Cambrésis (totalling around 40,000,000 livres). As such they embarked on an aggressive campaign of austerity. The Lorraine brothers themselves were partly responsible for the deficits creation through their advocacy for Henri's war policy in prior years. The marriages of the peace of Cateau-Cambrésis were also expensive, with Élisabeth's dowry totalling around 1,000,000 livres. The monetary crisis was furthered by the large influx of precious metals (gold and silver) from the 'new world'. As a result of this influx the livre was devalued. In total between 1501 and 1560 its value decreased by 56%. Many of those in France lost 2/3 of their purchasing power. This particularly impacted the rural nobility.

As a result of the financial difficulties, the crown's creditors were becoming increasingly restless, the Tuscan ambassador reporting in November that complaints were on the rise from the Florentine merchants of Lyon. Lorraine led the charge on soothing the kingdoms financial ills. He was assisted in this effort by the premier président (first president) of the chambre des comptes (chamber of accounts) and former councillor in parlement (sovereign courts of France) L'Hôpital. L'Hôpital was a client of the Lorraine's, who in his work, thanked the Cardinal for having 'twice saved him' from slanders.To increase revenues, forced loans were imposed on the provinces, Normandy alone was expected to provide 800,000 livres, though this forced loan would not be paid. Most of the measures the government undertook were towards decreasing expenditure. Much of the soldiery was disbanded by an edict on 14 July, with payment of their pay, which was in arrears, was deferred. The strength of the gendarmerie (heavy cavalry) was reduced from 8,800 to 6,275 men, a cut which saved the treasury around 700,000 livres (pounds) a year. This affected the 64 companies, which were captained by many of the most powerful nobles in the kingdom. Royal pensions were suspended, alienations of crown lands undertaken to finance the war were revoked (by edict on 18 August, with the exception of lands alienated for dowries), and the interest on royal debt reduced by almost half. Survivances (assuming an office via inheritance) to royal offices were cancelled. Commissioners were dispatched to recover the money of the forced loan of 1558 for the crown. Some royal offices were suppressed, and there was a particularly notable decline in the number of maître des requêtes from 1558 to 1566 as a result of Lorraine's policy on this front.

Discontented soldiers gathered to voice their displeasure to the Lorraine brothers at the château de Fontainebleau. Guise took a sympathetic approach, apologising for the poverty of the crown, and assuring them they would see employment by the crown again soon. Lorraine took a more aggressive approach, ordered them to depart under pains of execution, gallows having been erected around the château to convey this message to the soldiers. François published an edict by which all those who had come to court over grievances of payment or other financial matters were to withdraw within 24 hours or be hanged. The soldiers departed, furious and eager for revenge.

Either at this time or at the outbreak of civil war in 1562, Guise established the first three regiments of infantry in the French army. It was hoped that a greater structure could be provided to the infantry than that which existed below the office of colonel-general. It had the further advantage of creating captains who were not clients of the colone-general of the infantry, d'Andelot.

This austerity was not equally applied, and those who were clients of the Lorraine family were spared many of its effects. For example, Guise was not deprived of his control of Dourdan, Provins and Saumur by the revocation of alienations. Carroll describes this approach as 'nakedly partisan'. Lorraine for his part would be exempted from contributions to the clerical taxes such as the décime. The younger Lorraine brothers, such as the marquis d'Elbeuf and grand prieur were granted royal gifts of 45,000 livres and 8,000 livres respectively for their services. The duc de Longueville (who from August 1560 was under the wardship of the cardinal de Lorraine), received a gift of 50,000 livres in May 1560. The duc de Guise's kinsmen the duke of Ferrara who due to his role as a key creditor of the kingdom had been ceded the rights to nominate all royal officials in and around Caen was likewise exempt from the return of alienated territories. In return he advanced the crown 600,000 livres. As a result of this partisanship it was particularly radicalising to the clients of Montmorency and Protestant nobles who could not affiliate themselves with Guise. Those soldiers deprived of their pensions by the administration had the potential to be able to receive subsidies if they enjoyed the support of a relative who was on the in with the administration.

As far as alienations are concerned, Montmorency was deprived of the comté (county) de Beaumont that he had been granted in 1527, which had a value of around 50,000 livres. Marshal Saint-André, governor of the Lyonnais lost the seigneurie (lordship) of Saint-Seine-sur-Vigeanne and the seigneur de Monluc (who would go on to be the lieutenant-general of Guyenne) lost the comté de Gaure. In total the value of the land reclaimed by the crown is estimated by Harding to be worth around 2,500,000 livres. Saint-André tried to protect himself from alienations through offering his daughter in marriage to a son of the duc de Guise. Despite these reclamations, by 1567 the crowns revenues from annual domain receipts would amount to only 20,000 livres in comparison to the half a million it had reached in 1523.

Among the grandees, Guise was the only one who could look to territorial expansion in the post 1559 period. To this end he acquired the seigneurie de Cuverville in Normandy in September 1559.

Montmorency and Guise became involved in a dispute over which of them enjoyed the rights to the comté de Dammartin. Montmorency had first secured the territory through purchased of the rights from Philippe de Boulainvilliers one of the claimants to the comté. Guise struck back by buying the rights of the other claimant the sieur de Rambures for 18,000 livres, and trying to persuade Boullainvilliers to rescind her selling. Montmorency had little patience for Guise's attempt to intrude on the seigneurie and surprised the place, where Guise had stationed soldiers. Bringing artillery to bear to allow him to defend his claim to the comté. He despatched his son Damville to inform Guise of his resoluteness to maintain the territory. The matter therefore went to the courts.

By 1560 the financial situation was stabilising, if not improving. François issued a new edict in which on the pretext of the poverty of the kingdoms subjects he prohibited the giving of gifts to royal officers. This served as a mechanism to control the flow of wealth to provincial governors and other powerful lords. Montmorency in his capacity as governor of Languedoc protested pleading that he and his clients needed to accept the money offered to them by the province (among which was a sum of 18,000 livres for himself). He was informed by Lorraine that there were to be no exceptions to the king's edict.

According to Le Roux, the king himself was the source of edicts established against the carrying of weapons on 23 July and 17 December. First time offenders were to be subject to a 500 écus fine, with second time offenders to be hanged. In Durot's estimation, it was the insecurity of the Lorraine administration that led to the brothers getting the king to put forward the edict of 23 July. The weapon ban would be widely flouted.

=== Religious affairs ===
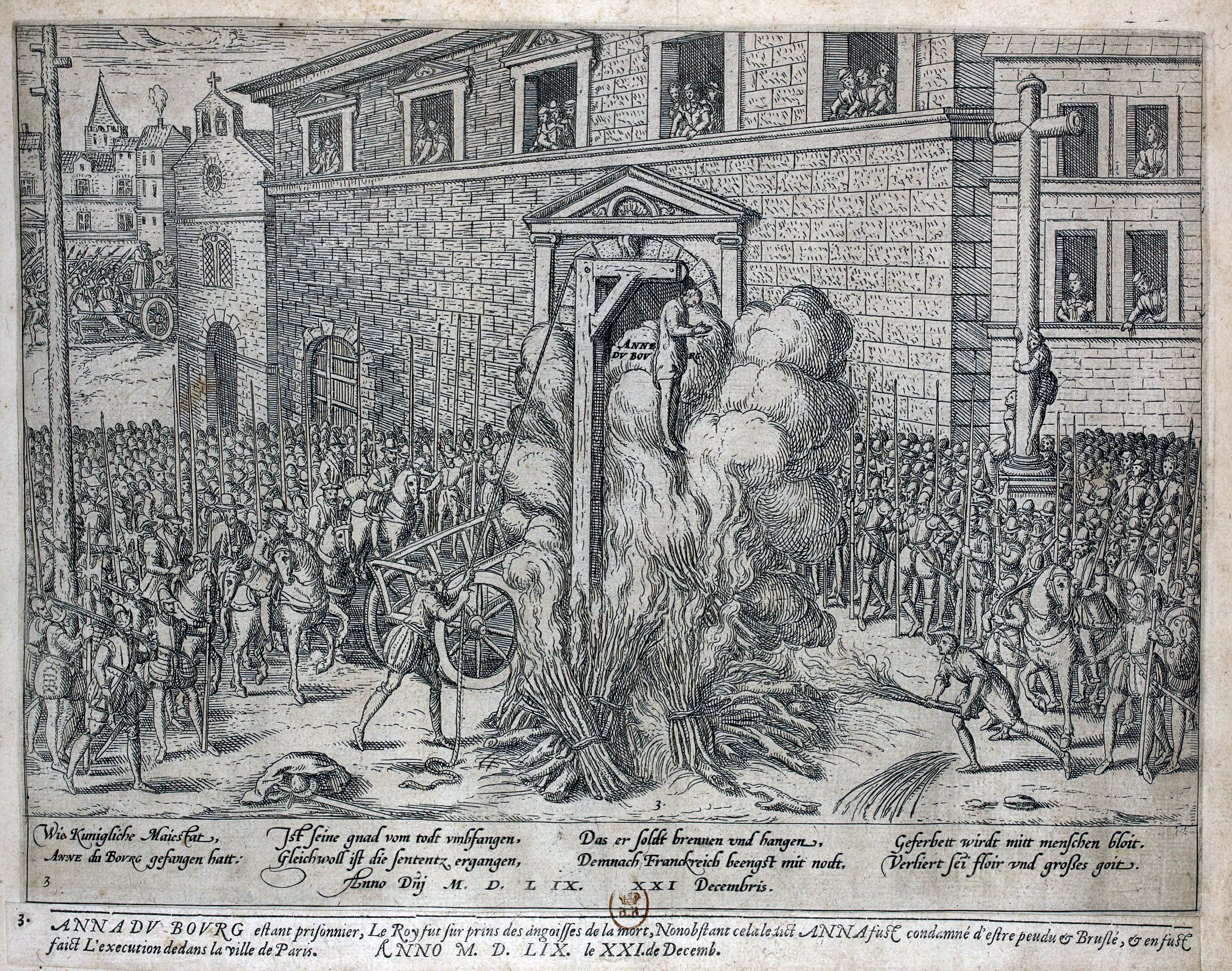
Anne du Bourg is executed

The Lorraine brothers continued the religious policy that had transpired under Henri II and before him François I, persecution of Protestantism. Henri had issued persecutory edicts in 1549, 1550, 1551, 1557 and finally in 1559. The final edict, that of Écouen would be characterised by the historian Crété as a 'declaration of war' on Protestantism. Montmorency would proudly take credit for it as his design. The Lorraine family did not yet have the reputation it would develop later for rigid orthodoxy, and the Spanish ambassador instead looked to Montmorency as the pre-eminent defender of Catholicism in France. Indeed, the cardinal de Lorraine was suspected by the priest Haton in 1558 as being part of the 'party of heretics', and the family was appealed to by the Protestant cantons of the Schweizerische Eidgenossenschaft after the persecutory edict of Compiègne to allow the king's subjects to live in peace. Until late 1559 it was Montmorency who was seen as the preeminent ultra-Catholic of the court. Nevertheless, Metz, which was under the government of the cardinal de Lorraine had a reputation for a government particularly committed to harsh repression.

In the first months of the new king's reign raids were organised against Protestant lodgings in Paris. This included assaults into the faubourg (suburb) Saint-Germain, where there was a district known as 'little Geneva'. The gentleman who had gathered to worship defended themselves with arms. Further inspections of houses were met by armed Protestants. Various texts were recovered from the raids, containing remonstrances to the king on both religious and political grounds. In particular, one treatise belonging to a noble named La Fredonnière, was noted privately by the procureur du roi (crown prosecutor) as being very well reasoned, even if applied to poor ends. Jouanna postulates it may have been a discussion of legal methods to remove the Guise from power. New laws were established against Protestantism. As early as 25 August, François requested a doctrinal condemnation of certain views on the mass and sacrament from the theological faculty of Paris - which complied several days later. On 4 September an edict established at Villers-Cotterêts declared that houses used for covert Protestant meetings were to be razed. This law would be registered on 23 December, with the parlement being reluctant to register the harsh terms. On 9 November, a new law made those who hosted or attended Protestant meetings liable for the death penalty. According to the edict the meetings not only attacked the mass but also the king. It was obligatory to report such meetings if one was aware of them. This introduced an element of popular involvement to the campaign against Protestantism. Informers could enjoy a share of the property confiscated from convicted heretics. The parlements of Aix and Toulouse were particularly rigorous in applying the persecutory edicts.

In a famous case on 23 December, the Protestant parlementaire Anne du Bourg was strangled and then burned at the stake. The other parlementaires who had been arrested alongside him on grounds of heresy were released after recanting. Their trials were largely softball affairs, their parlementaire colleagues not keen to see any of their number executed, and therefore offering every opportunity for them to exculpate themselves. Du Bourg's execution came despite the pleas of much of the Protestant world in his favour, among them the elector of the Palatine and the duchess of Savoy . One of the parlementaire judges most associated with the ultra-wing of the chamber that had moved for du Bourgs execution, president Minard, was assassinated on 12 December while returning home from the palais de justice by masked gunmen. The gates to Paris were hurriedly closed while the assassination was investigated. A Scotsman named Robert Stuart was arrested but confessed nothing under torture. Du Bourg also denied any knowledge of the plot from prison. The assassination of Minard made the government keener to see the execution of du Bourg through. While there was a prospect of the execution being avoided after he agreed to a carefully worded confession of faith on 13 December, he renounced his signature of the document on 19 December.

In this month, there was a riot at Saint-Médard in Paris during which several suspected Protestants were killed. According to a Catholic observer, the Protestants had made an assault on the church. On 25 December revenge was attained with the mortal wounding of the priest of the church of Saint-Médard while he was conducting mass.

Finally in February 1560 a law declared that it was the responsibility of all seigneurs who enjoyed the rights of high justice to apply the preceding anti-Protestant legislation or else they would void their rights to exercise such high justice.

=== Protestant initiative ===
During May 1559, the Protestants conducted their first national synod in France, meeting secretly in Paris. The synod offered an opportunity for the establishment of policy. A confession of faith was approved by the assembled delegates, and the discipline of the ecclesiastical hierarchy was established. The forms adopted were largely modelled on those of Geneva. Each church in the kingdom was to enjoy equal status. A representative from Poitiers proposed that they should tolerate theological diversity, a view which saw him expelled. The synod affirmed that the appropriate fate for heretics was burning. A representative present from Saint-Lô challenged the practice of tithes. They were responded to firmly by the elders present that though the priest unjustly usurped tithes to their own ends that it was necessary to pay them so as to be in obedience to the king. This would be broadened later to highlight the importance for Protestants of paying all royal taxes. This kept the Protestant movement in France formally in line with the thinking of Calvin on royal authority. Article 40 of the confession of faith that was devised expressed the need to obey laws, taxes and other aspects of seigneurial authority with a 'good will'. Despite this when the matter of the establishment of Protestant churches and conduct of preaching was raised, condemnation was avoided, despite Protestant churches and preaching both being against the king's law.

Early in the reign of the new king, the Protestants reached out to the king's mother Catherine and she offered them her tacit support on the condition they conducted themselves secretly and without scandal. This caused a growth in confidence among the Protestants, and she was informed that god would not leave the crime of du Bourg's killing unpunished and it would be visited on her and her children. Catherine was frustrated by this, and expounded to Condé (who had converted to Protestantism in August 1558), his wife Éléonore de Roye and Coligny that her sympathy to Protestantism derived from pity and compassion, not any opinion on their doctrine. She was distressed to see the Protestants brutalised not for any act of sedition but simply for their opinions, As a result of the Protestant rebuke she had received, she dropped her objection to the policy of raids that was being undertaken by the Lorraine government. She also did not intervene in du Bourg's favour and he was executed on 23 December. Nevertheless, she maintained a degree of covert contact with the Protestant community, well aware that they might throw their support behind the king of Navarre.

Even in 1559 the first acts of Protestant religious radicalism would be witnessable. In the faubourg (suburb) Saint-Marceau of Paris a group of Protestants killed the priest while he was raising the host. The congregation responded by having the doors to the church locked before slaughtering the priests killers.

Lorraine for his part began to support the idea of an assembly of the Gallican church, with even the Calvinist Protestants represented in its deliberations. His flirtations with church reform scandalised the Spanish ambassador Chantonnay. Lorraine was aware that the persecution his government was undertaking was unworkable, and desired to see religious unity restored in the French church.

=== Foreign Policy ===
On 12 July, Guise wrote to the governor of Metz, Senneterre warning him that the death of Henri might be used as a pretext by the German princes to make an attempt at recapturing the border city from the French. He would also apologise to Senneterre for the failure to pay him or his men for three months.

It was important for Guise and Lorraine to reassure the Spanish that the new government intended to abide by the peace established under Henri II. Alongside offering assurances to the Spanish envoys they made signs of friendship to the Spanish king and his Savoyard ally through the awarding of collars of the ordre de Saint-Michel. marshal Brissac was entrusted with the painful task of dismantling the French fortifications in French Piemonte and withdrawing the final French presence from Italia. On frontiers where the territorial concessions of the peace were less one sided, handovers and trades continued into 1560.

Cateau-Cambrésis specified that for French control of Calais (which had been seized in 1558) to be fully established, a sum of 500,000 livres was to be paid to the English. Lorraine was however reticent to honour this term, and opined to the Spanish ambassador that he lacked both the means and the desire to pay the sum and felt under no obligation to do so. To ensure their position on England was followed, the Lorraine administration replaced the English ambassador.

On 26 September, François, at the behest of Guise transferred sovereignty over the Barrois to the duc de Lorraine.

According to Carroll, it was in Scotland that the first shots of the civil war were fired.

The Lorraine regime, was keen to continue to offer military support for their sister Marie de Lorraine the regent of Scotland. To this end it was intended to send the marquis d'Elbeuf and the grand prieur, Guise's young brothers, to the country with reinforcements. While it could not fully alleviate the problem of unemployed soldiers, the Scottish expedition allowed for a redirection of much of the demobilised soldiery of the Italian wars. The first expedition north was conducted in August 1559, to join with the token French force already in Scotland under the command of La Brosse and the bishop of Amiens. The war caused great hardship in the ports of Normandy. Hosting an army and the repair of ships put significant burdens upon the area, with supplies and repairs alone costing 166,454 livres. Admiral Coligny worked hard towards the logistics of the operation, using the opportunity to build upon his clientele network in Normandy. According to the English ambassador in August he travelled to Calais (arriving sometime before the 21st) where he was to arrange 1,500 men to be convoyed to Scotland. Coligny sent orders to Le Havre for the preparation of the rest of the royal fleet to sail. On 2 December, the marquis d'Elbeuf was established by François as the lieutenant-general of Scotland, however Elbeuf lacked much credit in Normandy upon which to base this commission. The relief force departed on 6 December for Scotland but due to poor weather was largely driven onto sandbanks in Zeeland. Elbeuf himself departed from Calais on 21 December but the wind forced him to return to French port. Elbeuf therefore established himself at Dieppe on 5 January in preparations for a new attempt at departure. He stayed there for two months, during which Protestantism was strictly prohibited in the city. When he departed in March for Scotland services and psalm singing resumed in Dieppe.

With France demonstrating itself as hostile to her regime, Elizabeth I moved to blockade Leith. She further entered into an alliance with the Protestant Scottish rebel Lords of the Congregation by the treaty made at Berwick on 27 February 1560.

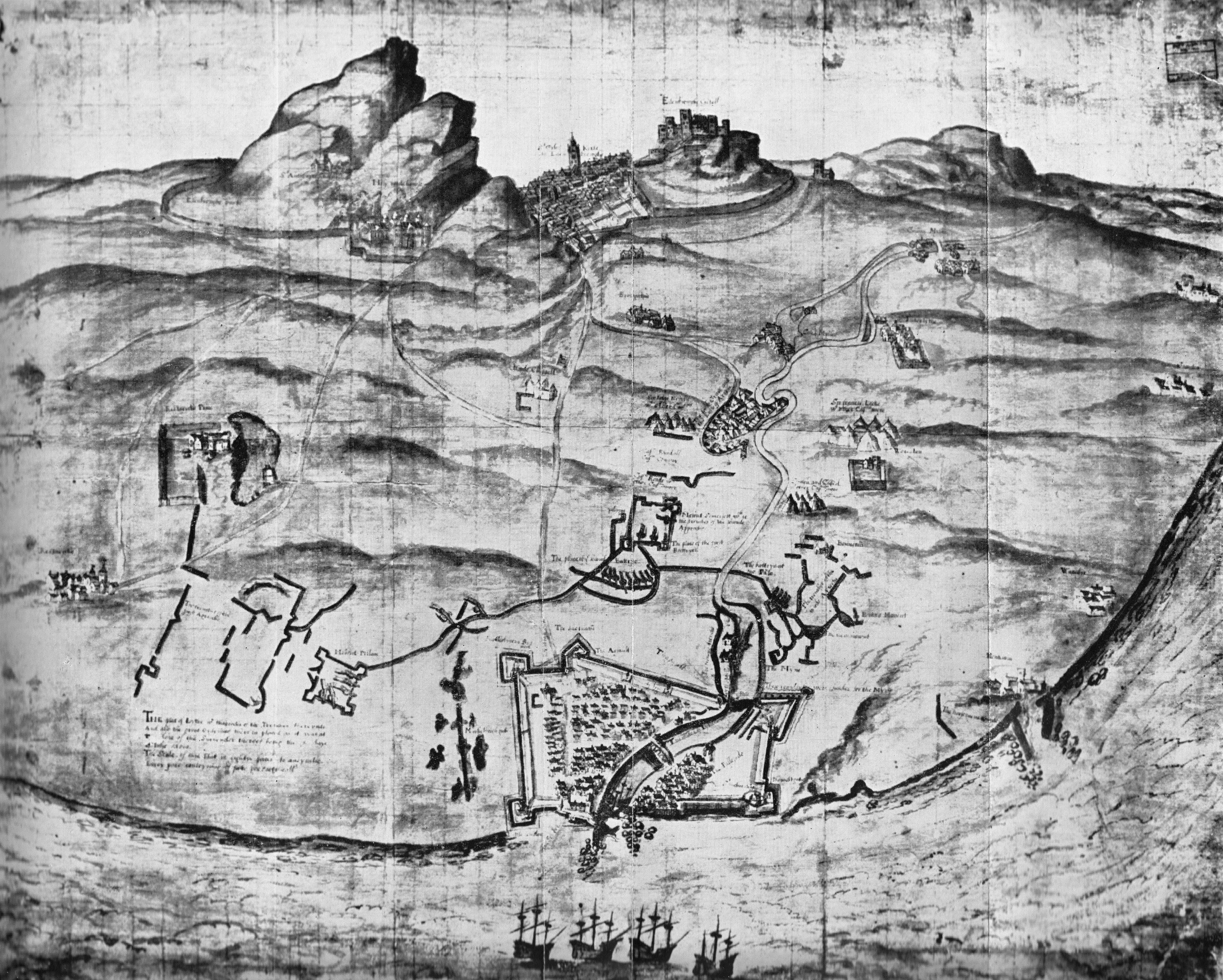
Conduct of the Siege of Leith

On 2 April, Lorraine wrote to his sister Marie de Lorraine, urging her to allow the Protestant rebels to live in peace, as long as they agreed not to challenge the authority of François and Marie Stuart. The bishop of Valence was dispatched to London to inform the English that Marie Stuart would renounce her claim to the English throne, but this concession came too late, the English had already sent 6,000 soldiers to support the Lords of the Congregation. The bombardment of Leith continued.

A second departure was scheduled for May 1560, this time featuring more local notables, among them the governor of Normandy, the duc de Bouillon; the bailli (baillif) of Rouen and the duc d'Aumale. Coligny meanwhile held a war council in Le Havre on 20 June with the various naval captains. He hoped to redirect the energy of marauding bands of French companies outwards to the foreign project. The captains informed him the troops did not want depart and there were insufficient ships to participate. D'Andelot who was stationed in Marseille refused to embark his ships with his men leading to other captains imitating his example. Peace would be made before the expedition could depart in July, shortly after the death of Marie de Lorraine. The peace was largely forced on the Lorraine administration by domestic affairs. France was now both too unstable and too poor to undertake the expedition. As a result, French influence in Scotland collapsed along with the termination of the Auld Alliance. French troops evacuated Scotland and Marie Stuart agreed to renounce her coat of arms, though this did not come to pass.

France enjoyed difficult relations with Portugal during this period. The presence of a French colony at Villegagnon greatly aggrieved the Portuguese. Matters reached a head in March 1560 when the Portuguese destroyed Forte Coligny in Brasil. Keen to smooth relations over after this violent episode a proposal for marriage between the king's sister Marguerite and the Portuguese king Sebastião was floated, though Lorraine was keen to reserve Marguerite for a Spanish match.

== Collapse of order ==
On 15 November 1559, the English ambassador reported that the king abandoned his hunt after becoming aware of a rumour of a conspiracy against the crown. His Garde Écossaise (Scots Guard) was issued mail to wear and pistols.

Lorraine found himself increasingly fearful of being assassinated as 1559 came to a close. Indeed, in January 1560 individuals with such nefarious motives infiltrated the court while it stayed at Blois though nothing came of it.

With the government increasingly aware of the fraught situation in the kingdom, it was decided that in the spring of 1560 the court would conduct a tour of the kingdom, visiting those parts of it most greatly troubled by disorder (into Guyenne passing through Poitiers, Bordeaux, Bayonne, then onto Languedoc and Provence). The king would be able to demonstrate his authority, and illustrate that the Lorraine brothers were his advisors and not regents. However, before the tour could truly begin a conspiracy would strike against the crown forcing its cancellation.

The situation in Paris was poor enough that during February 1560, Coligny was charged with making his entrance to the city prior to the king's, so that he might soothe the people.

=== Conspiracy of Amboise ===
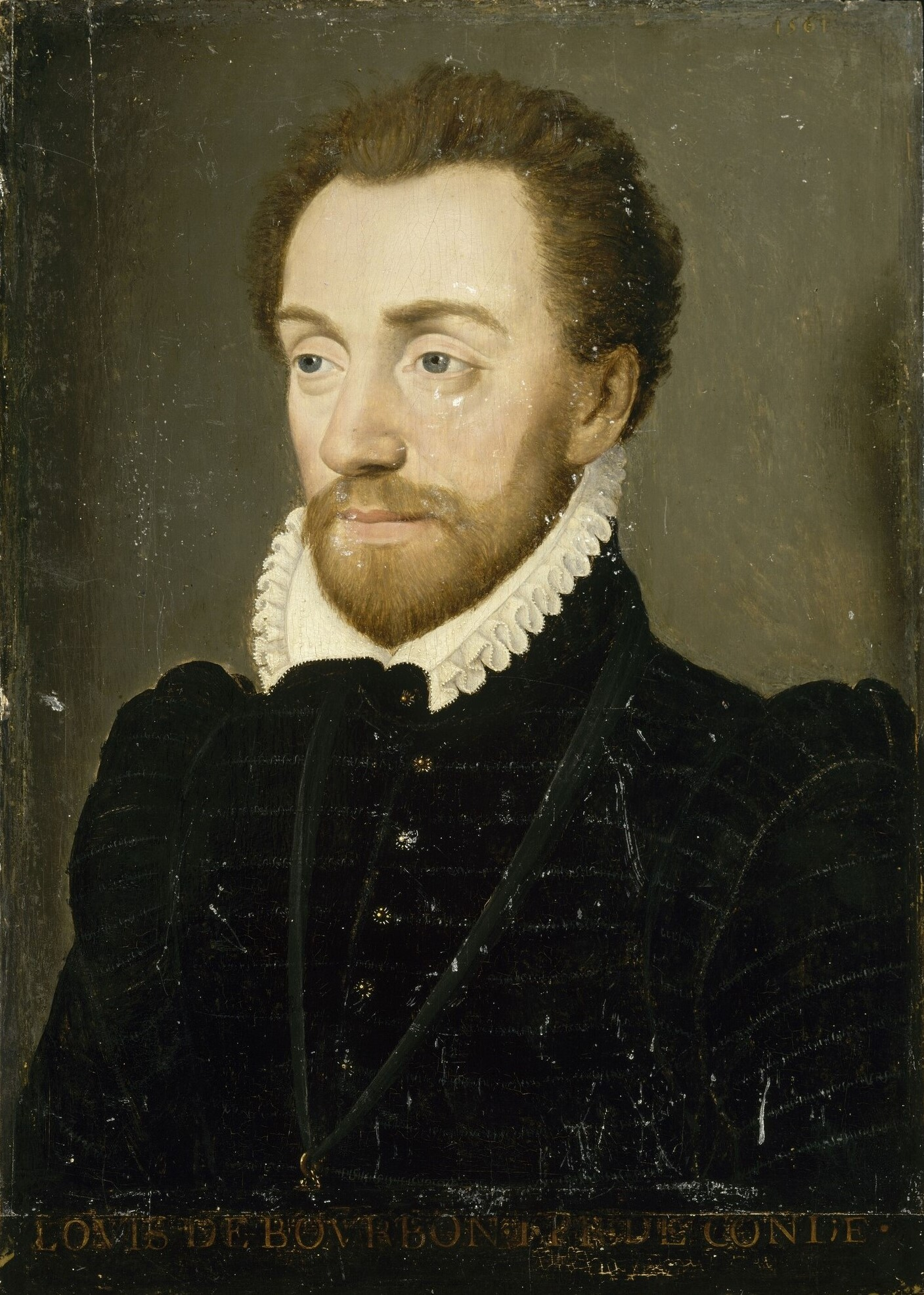
Alleged 'chef muet' of the conspiracy, the prince de Condé

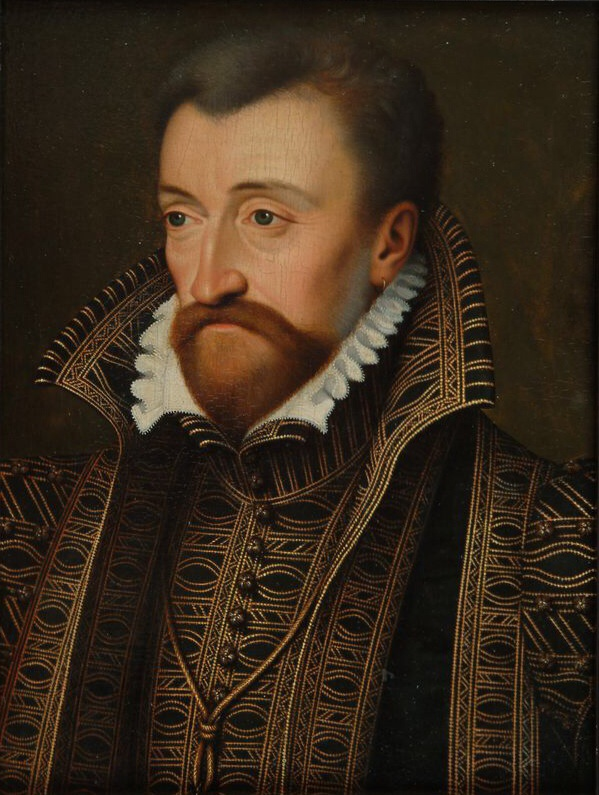
Premier prince du sang the king of Navarre who remained aloof of involvement in the conspiracy

A Protestant conspiracy was devised between various malcontent gentleman, the chief architect of which was a certain Périgord gentleman named the sieur de La Renaudie. To provide the conspiracy legitimacy, it operated under the auspices of a prince du sang, Condé, distant cousin of the king. While the premier prince du sang, Navarre had been desired for the initiative by its devisers he remained aloof. The depth of Condé's involvement is a matter of academic dispute. He would operate from the shadows while the leadership of the conspiracy was taken by La Renaudie. Holt describes him as 'clearly endorsing' the plot. Jouanna argues that he clearly knew of the conspiracy and approved of it, but had little involvement in it beyond this. Durot takes the position that while evidence of his involvement is lacking, it was apparent that he was aware of it and did not bother to inform the king - he was therefore guilty for the Lorraine government by this fact alone.

Jean Calvin was also approached with informed about the planned conspiracy, and provided his tacit support, though he wished for any such resistance movement to be led by the premier prince du sang (Navarre). In a letter he wrote on 23 March, before he was aware of the failure of the conspiracy, he described it as a 'magnificent effort' that would bring about the 'extermination of Antoine' (by which is meant Guise). According to Crouzet his approach was 'wait and see', the conspiracies success would prove god favoured it, and if it failed it was a folly. Théodore de Bèze, Calvin's right-hand man was more bombastic in his support, and provided an approving psalm to La Renaudie. De Bèze also aided in the distribution of a tract in support of the rebellion. La Renaudie visited Geneva for a recruitment drive for the conspiracy in December, and informed those who he recruited of Calvin's secret approval for the coup. He had considerable success among the exiled French nobility, with the sieur de Villemongis, and the sieur de Compeys agreeing to participate among around 60 other nobles who were in the city.

The conspirators also looked abroad to both queen Elizabeth of England, and the elector of the Palatine, however neither would offer material support.

The Protestant church at large in France remained largely uninvolved. Aside from some churches in Provence, that of Lyon and Paris, most refused to contribute. For example, the Protestant church of Nîmes which was approached declined the proposal. On 21 February in Provence representatives met from sixty churches at Mérindol and declared the Protestant seigneur de Mauvans their military head to lead an army of around 2,000 men. One hundred volunteers were directed north to join with La Renaudie. Mauvans soldiers would first attack Pertuis and then the 'strategic location' of Durance.

The Protestant pastors La Roche Chandieu and Boisnormand were heavily involved. La Renaudie also hired mercenaries for the coup. Some nobles of significance were involved, at the head of whom La Renaudie himself was a rich noble of an ancient Périgourdin lineage whose brother in law the sieur de Buy, an échevin (alderman) of Metz had been executed by the Lorraine administration after he had gone to the Empire to find support of the Lutheran German princes for the Protestant community of Metz and the political ambitions of the king of Navarre. Around La Renaudie were the baron de Tursan whose family traced its roots back to the 12th century and who boasted relations with the queen of Navarre; captain Mazères a Béarnais noble who also had ties to the Albret family of whom the queen of Navarre was a member; the seigneur de Maligny and Maligny 'le jeune' (the young), two Burgundian gentleman in the Bourbon network (and first cousins of the vidame de Chartres); captain Cocqueville, a client of Condé's from the Picard nobility and the baron de Rauny who leant his château de Noizay, only 5 km away from the royal residence of Amboise for the shelter of the conspirators. Many exiles who were residing in Geneva threw themselves in with the plot, among them La Renaudie's chief lieutenant the sieur de Villemongis.

Some of the conspirators hoped that they would be permitted to approach the king and present their confession of faith. Others hoped to reason with the king as to his administration. In response to their pleas he would dismiss the Lorraine brothers, after which the two men could be put on trial. Some historians, such as Kingdon argue that the conspiracy planned not a trial for the Guise, but rather their assassination. Durot notes that the conspiracies failure possibly saved their lives. An Estates General would be summoned, and Protestantism legalised. If necessary the king would be kidnapped or even deposed if he failed to adopt the Protestant faith. The Estates General would be justified in meeting on the grounds that the king was too young to rule alone.

In the discourses of literature theorists supported this argument, which ignored the king being of legal age to rule by dividing the onset of adulthood into two periods, the first of which had ended at fourteen, the second of which lasted until the king was twenty five. By this logic while the signature of the king was valid, he could not reasonably assess those who were to govern in his name. Those who argued the matter also looked back to the reign of Charles VI who was declared king while he was still 11, but was governed for by his uncles until he was 20. The Lorraine government responded to this ideological angle with a request for one of their protégés (Du Tillet) to respond in kind. Du Tillet therefore wrote a treatise entitled 'Pour la majorité du roy très chrestien contre les escrits des rebelles' (For the majority of the most Christian king against the writings of the rebels). This work cited the ordinance of 1403 but also pushed further in arguing that the king was fully invested in his authority at the moment of the death of his predecessor and regencies were thus unnecessary for a king of any age. It was important for the administration that Guise and Lorraine did not personally create the argument as that would be to concede the point to their detractors. Du Tillet in turn was subject to attack as someone in the pay of the Guise, counter examples such as the Estates General of 1484 were presented to those he had provided.

If there was resistance to the coup, the conspirators would bring weapons to use against Guise. The conspirators met in Nantes in February 1560 and affirmed the purpose of their forthcoming coup, this meeting was to take the place of an Estates General, which they lacked the powers at present to convene. La Renaudie opened the gathering with a reminder of the various injustices the Lorraine brothers had inflicted upon the kingdom. La Renaudie's leadership was affirmed, with his right to raise an army established. An oath was sworn in favour of the chef muet (silent leader) of the conspiracy. Such an oath was a tradition of German landsknechts. The meeting of so many nobles was able to transpire without suspicion as there had recently been a marriage in the city of Nantes which attracted many nobles. With the meeting concluded La Renaudie went to Paris to meet with Condé and raise more men for the coup.

Word reached the Lorraine government of this plot, betrayed to them by a Parisian lawyer named des Avenelles who had stayed with La Renaudie in Paris. He confessed to being uneasy to what he overheard, but was soon granted a gift of 10,000 livres by the government for his troubles. The government had some scepticism of what they were told by des Avenelles but the details were confirmed by a client of the duc de Nevers whose brother was involved in the plot.

Catherine took the moment of this conspiracy to express her frustrations at the policy that had been followed so far by the government. Lorraine was taken aback, and offered her his resignation, however she refused it.

The court quickly relocated from Blois to the more defensible château d'Amboise. The wearing of long coats and wide boots was prohibited by Guise at this time for fear that they could conceal weapons. The ducs d'Aumale, Nevers and Nemours, the marshal de Saint-André and the marquis d'Elbeuf took to forming a protective ring around the person of the king during this period of danger. Guise followed suit and took to employing an Italian guard for his protection. The chevaliers de l'ordre de Saint-Michel (knights of the order of Saint-Michel) and gentilhomme de la chambre du roi (gentleman of the king's chamber) were ordered to lodge and sleep in the château with the king. The Lorraine's invited the nephews of Montmorency to Amboise: Admiral Coligny, the cardinal de Châtillon and D'Andelot. Coligny attended the court only reluctantly, keen to focus on combatting the English queen's designs on Scotland, he was therefore keen to be released so he could travel to Normandy. By this means the Lorraine brothers hoped to ensure the separation of the Montmorency and the Bourbons. At Amboise, Coligny protested the poor treatment the administration had shown his uncle Montmorency. Condé, whose involvement in the conspiracy the Lorraine brothers suspected, was also invited, and he arrived around 14 March to participate in the defence of Amboise.

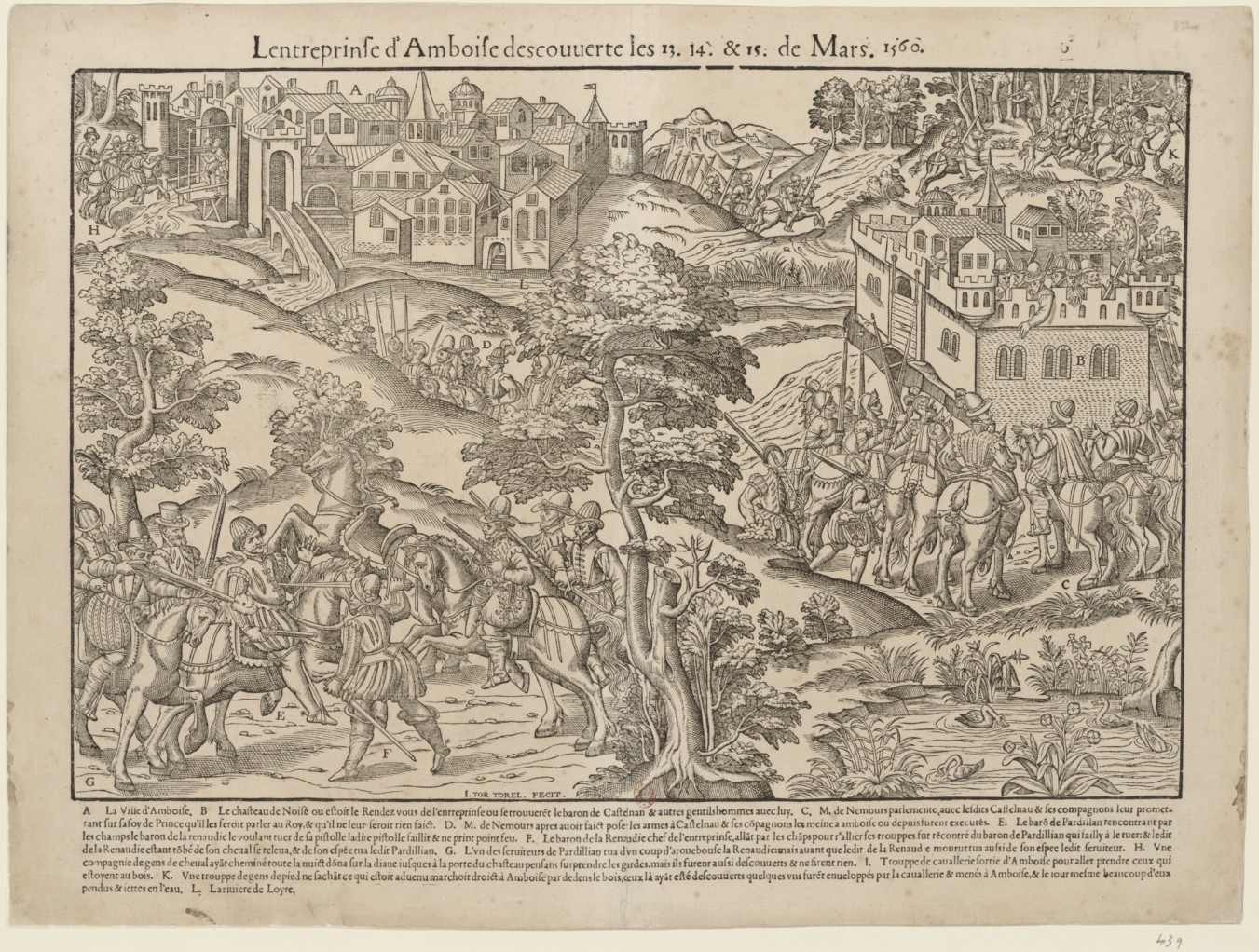
Unfolding of the conspiracy of Amboise

Amboise was then put on siege footing. The conspirators, who had assembled in the woods around Amboise were captured from 16 to 20 March. Many of those captured were simple artisans, who posed little threat to the court, therefore prisoners such as these were released soon after their capture, some given a crown by the king. The initial arrests were conducted with little violence, causing the Spanish ambassador to remark with shock that they surrendered like they were children or sheep. On 14 March a skirmish between royal forces and the rebels transpired in Tours. The assault launched on the château d'Amboise proper on 17 March by 200 men, among them Maligny le jeune, Bertrand de Chaidue and captain Cocqueville was bloodily repulsed by Guise personally. Condé could do little but watch the failed attack from the battlements. La Renaudie himself was killed in a minor skirmish a few days later on 19 March. His body was brought to Amboise where it was dismembered and displayed. The attack on the château on 17 March led to the court responding with summary hangings with the bodies displayed from the walls of the château. Others were cut down where they had assembled or drowned in the Loire. The executions for the crime of lèse majesté were an opportunity for dramatisations, as later illustrated famously with the retellings that the sieur de Villemongis dipped his hands in the blood of his deceased companions and called out 'lord, this is the blood of your children, you will avenge them' before he was executed. Condé attended all the executions and he made sure not to betray any emotions concerning the events. D'Andelot by contrast protested the bloody suppression of the conspiracy.

Guise dispatched loyal captains and seigneurs to ensure the preservation of nearby Orléans, Blois, Angers, Tours and Bourges. The comte de Sancerre who was entrusted with the security of Tours came up against the baron de Castelnau on 14 March, and was forced to retreat. Castelnau did not exploit this moment of advantage and slipped away. Sancerre was able to arrest five men in Tours, and brought them back to Amboise. On 15 March Marshal Saint-André was tasked with returning to Tours with 200 horseman. Along with him came the duc de Nemours, and the duc d'Aumale (brother of Guise). There was another violent confrontation at Tours on 17 March. Marshal Thermes were sent to Blois, while Marshal Vielleville made towards Orléans and the duc de Montpensier made his way to Angers. The seigneur de La Rochefoucauld went to Bourges and the lieutenant-general of Guyenne, Burie was despatched to Poitiers. At Blois a cache of weapons was uncovered.

A letter was sent to the sénéschal (seneschal) of Lyon instructing him to let it be known that any who had associated with the conspiracy and who now wished to come forth and inform the government of what they knew would be granted a complete amnesty, but any who continued after an eight-day period to be involved in the conspiracy would be declared guilty of lèse majesté.

The duc de Nemours was responsible for the capture of Mazères and Raunay. He then intercepted a band approaching from the south from the château de Noizay. He promised them that he would see that they receive an audience with the king. They would instead be taken to Amboise and tortured. Among those who he intercepted was the baron de Castelnau who was executed after a short trial. Nemours protested to chancellor Olivier that he had been made to dishonour his word, to which Olivier replied that the king was not bound by promises made to rebels. Castelnau was a particularly prominent participant in the conspiracy - his father had been a chambellan du roi (king's chamberlain) and an advisor to the king's council during the reign of Louis XII. He was executed despite the protestations of the Châtillon, the duc d'Aumale, duchesse de Guise and Catherine, who pled for the life of Castelnau and several other prisoners.

=== Aftermath of the conspiracy ===
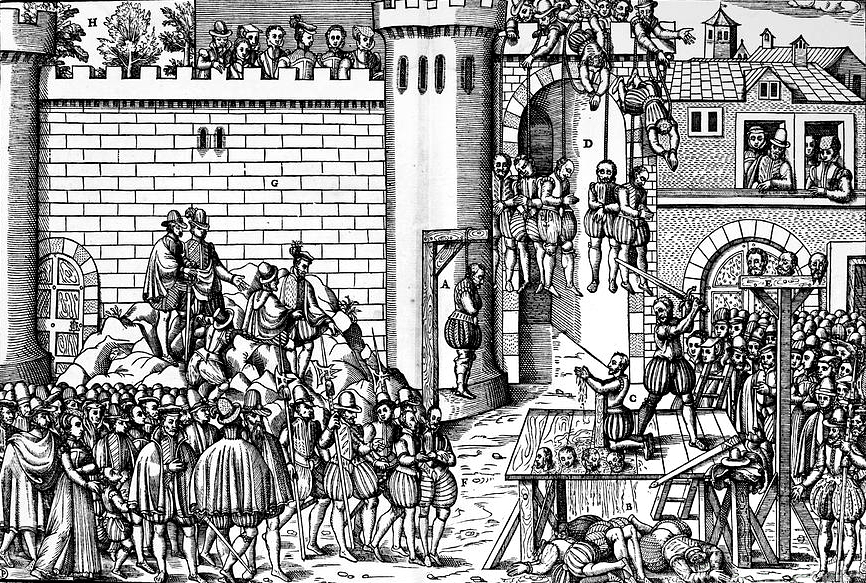
Execution of the conspirators

The failed conspiracy cemented the impression in the minds of many Catholics that Protestantism and sedition were one and the same. Meanwhile, Protestant polemics denounced the tyranny of the Lorraine government. This was most famously embodied in the pamphlet of François Hotman titled 'Le Tigre' which decried the cardinal de Lorraine as a "venomous viper" who was abusing the "youth of our king". The pamphlet further laid at the feet of Lorraine all the troubles that had befallen the kingdom under Henri II's reign, from the wars to the intrigues of Diane. A printer found to be in possession of the pamphlet in Paris was executed. Other Protestant pamphlets sought to illustrate the purely political nature of the conspiracy, separating it from their religion. In their efforts to combat the upswell of Protestant pamphleteers that emerged after the conspiracy of Amboise, the government was continually frustrated as they found the addresses of the printers were often false on the pamphlets, this made it difficult to get at the printers. Protestant polemics also began to address François himself in the hope that he was now approaching an age at which he might 'emancipate himself from the tutelage of the Lorraine brothers'.

On La Renaudie's secretary, La Bigne were found two documents, one a confession of faith to be presented to the king, the other was titled Les États de France opprimés par la tyrannie de Guise, au Roi leur Souverain Seigneur (The Estates of France oppressed by the tyranny of the Guise to their sovereign lord the king). This text was largely political in character, stating that although there were some in the conspiracy who were Protestant, it was only the political injustices that had driven them to rise up. It was intended that this document be presented to the king. Guise and Lorraine were aware that the conspiracy was largely focused on their government, however by the end of March the official narrative was that the king himself was at risk of being murdered had the conspiracy succeeded. The notion of regicide was not overemphasised however due to fear it might actually inspire a desire to commit such an act in addition to the fact it would be a difficult narrative to maintain.

Guise was established as lieutenant-general of the kingdom by François to better enable him to combat the crisis. The historian Garrisson argues that the Conspiracy of Amboise should not be seen as an isolated conspiracy, but the first event that can be considered a blow of the Religious Wars. Tortured prisoners implicated Condé in the conspiracy. Condé's suspected involvement in the Conspiracy of Amboise led to his disgrace. The 70,000 livres he had been granted by the king the prior year was not delivered. The suspicion of his guilt had only been furthered by the role of one of his écuyers (squires) in the escape from captivity of Maligny. Condé was forbidden to leave court without the king's permission. Similar prohibitions were given to the Châtillon brothers and the sieur de Soubise.

Condé indignantly protested his innocence in front of the king's council, the ducs and peers of the realm and the chevaliers (knights) of the Ordre de Saint-Michel (Order of Saint-Michel) on 2 April. During his denouncement of the 'wickedly and cowardly lies' that were levelled against him, the cardinal de Lorraine kept his eyes affixed on the ground. He denounced his accusers as liars, the worst insult a noble could make against another. Any challenge to Condé after this would be an invitation to a duel (a matter in which Condé informed the council he would renounce his privileges as a prince du sang). Guise assured him that the king was pleased to hear of his innocence. Guise further promised that if someone dared to accuse him, that he would serve the prince as his second in the subsequent duel. Nevertheless, Condé's residence was ransacked and searched for evidence of his complicity on 18 April, but without result. His brother's secretary, who was present in the capital was searched for evidence that might prove Bourbon complicity.

Condé was able to leave court a free man and after initially retreating to La Ferté-sous-Jouarre took refuge with Navarre in their southern court of Nérac, far away from the court. On route south, he met with the elder Maligny brother in Poitiers. Navarre was moved to support his brother (now convinced there was a great deal of discontent among the nobility), and engaged in dialogue with the Protestant queen Elizabeth of England and German princes in the hopes of securing military support. Navarre looked to the Schmalkaldischer Bund (Schmalkadischer league) for support in May. In June the firebrand Protestant polemicist, François Hotman fresh off writing his denunciation of Lorraine ('Le Tigre'), also travelled to Nérac to meet with Condé. On 20 July Calvin's right-hand man De Bèze was dispatched to Nérac at Navarre's request, and may have secured the conversion to Protestantism of Jeanne d'Albret, the queen of Navarre during his stay. De Bèze stayed at court with Navarre for three months. Benedict argues that de Bèze and Calvin were jointly working on funding the raising of troops for Navarre, so that he could be persuaded to assert his right to the government. Despite the plotting, Navarre also offered the services of 5,000 men to the crown for the protection of François against rebels. Instead of accepting this offer, François asked for the imprisonment of Navarre's Protestant ministers (David and Boisnormand), only to be informed by the prince that they were no longer in his service, but that he would arrest them if they returned to Nérac. When Boisnormand returned in June, rather than arresting him, Navarre accepted him back into his service.

Montmorency's nephew d'Andelot was also suspected of involvement in the conspiracy, and he responded by retreating to Brittany. In Crété's estimation, d'Andelot would not have involved himself without the assent of his brother Coligny, and Coligny disapproved of the disorder of conspiracy, preferring legal avenues to challenge the Guise.

Montmorency was the first to be informed of the conspiracy by the government after the crown became aware of what was planned. He was asked to hand over several prisoners from Vincennes, but was not instructed to come to Amboise. Guise was confident that the Constable was not involved in the conspiracy and did not want him to overshadow them in Amboise. The Constable joined his eldest son Marshal de Montmorency in leading the effort to combat any moves in support of the conspiracy emerging in Paris. They oversaw house to house searches and the expulsion of those who did not reside in the city. Aside from a few weapons the searches did not yield any results. Indeed, the main effect of their security measures, was to excite the fears of Catholic Parisians. Despite their participation in the suppression, when reporting to the parlement of Paris on the conspiracy, Montmorency characterised it as an effort against the king's ministers, as opposed to an attack on the king himself. In response to his explanation of what was transpiring the parlement granted Guise the honorary title of conservateur de la patrie on 28 March.

Beginning on 10 March 1560, the Protestants held their second national synod, at Poitiers. The meeting made preparations for political action at an upcoming estates general, and challenged the rights of the Lorraine family to govern. As far as confessional matters were concerned it was agreed Protestant marriage between first cousins should not be prohibited, as it was not a 'biblical prohibition' but rather one that derived from magistrates, thus scripture was elevated above secular law. It was further decided that each province was to have a representative at the court to represent their interests, and present the crown with a confession of faith. It was agreed that obedience of royal religious edicts would be left up to the discretion of the individual Protestant pastor.

This synod represented an innovation on Protestant strategy, that could now look to the possibility of direct pressure and influence on the crown, as opposed to the only mechanism of expression deriving from conspiracy and foreign diplomatic pressure.

On 27 March 1560 the aged chancellor of France Olivier died.

In Paris after a sermon in the church of Saint-Innocents a suspected 'Lutheran' had their throat cut.

=== New religious policy ===
At this time the crown began to adopt a new policy as regarded the Protestants of the kingdom. The first manifestation of this, the Edict of Amboise was issued on 2 March. It made a distinction for the first time between the crimes of heresy and sedition. Religious prisoners were also to be released on the condition they lived as good Catholics henceforth. Those who had taken up arms and conspired against the king or state, had attempted to free other prisoners by force or who were pastors were excluded from enjoying release. The edict was justified on the grounds that François did not wish to begin his reign with bloodshed. It was signed by the cardinals de Lorraine, Bourbon and Châtillon the ducs de Guise, Nevers, Aumale and Montpensier and the seigneurs de Saint-André and Coligny alongside the secrétaire l'Aubespine. This edict pre-dated the conspiracy proper, though the court had already moved to Amboise for its security. With this edict, de facto tacit toleration of private worship was granted. Catherine ensured the edict would be quickly registered by the parlement, despatching the secrétaire des finances Jacques de Moroges to ensure that it transpired in good time. A few days after this edict, the right of petition was granted to the Protestants. The leaders of this about face in royal policy is disputed, some have argued that Catherine or Coligny were its architects. Durot sees February as the time at which Catherine emerges from her period of mourning to take an active political role advocating the new policy. With royal authority weakened she saw the necessity of assuming an active position to protect her son. Other historians, such as Le Roux have argued that in fact the Cardinal de Lorraine was the author of the shift in royal policy. Indeed, Lorraine wrote to the Pope soon after the conspiracy on 22 March arguing that if a general council of the church could not be called soon to reform the Catholic church then cardinal de Tournon should be dispatched with legate powers to hold a national council to revitalise the French Catholic church, restoring its 'primitive beauty'. The Pope responded by harshly critiquing French religious policy, denouncing the recent pardons of Protestants. Pius chided Lorraine himself as a potential schismatic. Christin argues the effect of the edict was to deny the Protestants the rhetorical position of acting as defenders of tradition and legality against 'foreign tyranny' by separating political protest/sedition from 'heresy'. The radical Protestants would be isolated and the more peaceable majority would cease to be an issue.

Around this period, a new term became popularised for the Protestants of France, the term 'Huguenot'. This term possibly derives from the term 'eidegenossen' (confederates) a faction in Genevan politics. By the use of the term, the Protestants were linked to Geneva, the source of their 'heresy' and 'rebellious inclinations'. An alternate etymology of the name links it 'king Huguet', a mythical lord of the shadows. This was due to the Protestant tendency for meeting in secret at night.

Guise continued his efforts to buttress the regime against any military challenge. On 31 March he wrote to the parlements, baillages and sénéchaux of the kingdom. He denounced the conspiracy as a detestable treason brought about by those of the 'new doctrine' (Protestants). He raised troops from Lorraine, the Holy Roman Empire and his Gascon bands which were stationed in his governate of Dauphiné. He established garrisons in Orléans, Gien, and Montargis. He distributed royal patronage to reward loyal companions, with seventeen receiving the collar of the Ordre de Saint-Michel. Meanwhile, in Metz, which had been under the administration of Lorraine since 1558, the persecution of Protestantism was redoubled. By the treaty of Edinburgh in July, the Lorraine administration divested itself of its Scottish commitments so that they might focus on domestic troubles.

During spring the estates of the cardinal de Lorraine at Dampierre and Cluny were ransacked by Protestants. Lorraine was also burned in effigy in Paris at the place Maubert. In May the English ambassador reported that there was a plan for six men to assassinate the duc de Guise while he was on a hunting trip. Around this time, Coligny also warned the duchesse de Guise of a plot against her husband's life.

In May the liberal religious policy was furthered in two edicts, the first the Edict of Loches, issued sometime between 15 and 24 May. This edict re-iterated the royal forgiveness for religious offences. This edict may not have featured the exclusion clauses that were featured in the pardons of March. The edict also did not stress the future Catholicity of the pardoned heretics in the way that the edict of Amboise did. It is possible that this edict was issued in response to a new Amboise like conspiracy, as the English ambassador reports the gathering of around 6,000 men in Romorantin, near where the court was staying in Loches on 19 May. Some of them had escaped from prison in Tours. The more substantial Edict of Romorantin followed in thee same month. It voided the rights of royal courts to oversee trials of Protestants, which were now to be the purview of ecclesiastical courts. Ecclesiastical courts did not have the power to impose the death penalty. Thus the death penalty for heresy alone was effectively abolished, unless the ecclesiastical court referred the case to the parlement for the purpose of the sentence. Catholic priests were encouraged to draw back Protestants to the faith through persuasion and by living model lives as examples. This included urgings for bishops to reside in their diocese. By this means, the situation for the prosecution of 'heresy' reverted to how it had been at the time of the 1535 edict of Coucy. It was re-affirmed however that illicit assemblies remained prohibited. Seditious assemblies and violent demonstrations now became the purview of the présidiaux courts. Liberty of conscience was implied by the edict without being stated. The parlement resisted registration of the new edict, remonstrating with the crown that it was not right to remove competency for such cases from the king's justices, this caused a delay of two months in registration with the edict being approved on 16 July. In September L'Hôpital argued with président Le Maistre in the parlement of Paris about the courts approach to matters of heresy, charging the court with encouraging seditions which Le Maistre denied. The parlementaire retorted by observing that several important offices of the crown were held by Protestants. The edict would largely be a dead letter, left unenforced by the authorities it was entrusted to.

Catherine was again approached by Protestants on 24 May. They protested in a written remonstrance that the amnesty measures of the previous months had not in fact been applied to 'gentleman of good faith' who had withdrawn themselves from the Amboise coup and yet were still subject to execution. Catherine was approached while reading the remonstrance by Marie Stuart, who informed the Lorraine government of the matter. Catherine therefore sacrificed the bearer of the remonstrance to imprisonment, while maintaining contact covertly. During June she spoke with La Planche, an advisor to Montmorency's eldest son. He informed her that there were two types of Protestants, religious and political. The latter of whom desired the establishment of government by the princes du sang. If government was put in their hands, they would fade away, and the religious Protestants would be soothed.

In July, Catherine dispatched Coligny to investigate the religious situation in Normandy. By this means, Catherine sought to show the Lorraine government that it was not only matters of religion that motivated the discord that was shaking the kingdom.

=== Rebellion and sedition ===
François for his part was humiliated by the attempted coup, and announced that it was his intention to establish his authority as king over the rebels. In the south of France, in Dauphiné, Provence and Guyenne, men rose up in arms in various disorders after the failure of Amboise. Towns and villages were seized by the Protestants. The disorders that followed Amboise lead to the historian Brunet putting the start of the wars of religion in March 1560, at least for the south of France. The historian Crouzet describes the period beyond Amboise as the 'civil war before the wars of religion'. Greengrass sees a move from 'localised militancy' to a 'sustained militant insurrection' between 1560 and 1562. In the seized towns, the Protestants modelled their administration on that of the independent city states like Geneva. In Provence the Protestant rebels were led by the seigneur de Mauvans (whose brother Antoine had been killed in 1559 at Draguignan), in Dauphiné by captain Montbrun, Maligny would be involved in a plot at Lyon, in Languedoc Ardoine de Maillan had led the conspirators, and the seigneur de Duras operated in Gascogne. In September, the Ferrarese ambassador reported that there were troop build ups in Hainaut, Normandy, Guyenne and Dauphiné.

Around Saint-Lô peasants refused to pay their dîme (tithes) to the Catholic church. the seigneur de Monluc reports similar refusals in Guyenne. Such refusals are also attested around Nîmes and in Saintonge. This refusal could be seen across the bounds of religion. Heller notes that in the period of the civil wars it is as visible in the Catholic peasantry of the Biterrois as it was among the Protestant peasants of the Cévennes.

Governors across the south and west of France reported that Protestants were worshipping publicly in services attended by hundreds or even thousands of worshippers. The lieutenant-general of Languedoc protested to the crown that they approached financially vulnerable nobles offering them money to become their protectors. The seigneur de Monluc claimed to have been approached with such offers three times, with sums totalling 120,000 livres.

==== Normandy ====
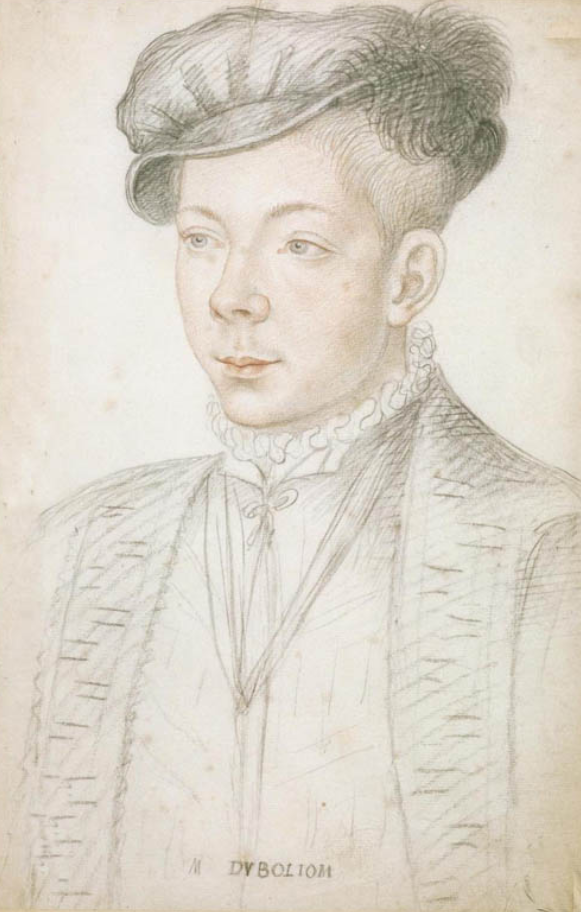
Duc de Bouillon, governor of Normandy

The king ordered the governor of Normandy to travel to his governate in October so that he might suppress all disorders and see to the punishments of those responsible.

A Protestant church had been established in Dieppe and in October the governor of Normandy the duc de Bouillon oversaw its dismantling. He also replaced the captain of Dieppe, a Protestant client of Coligny's. However, Bouillon would allow the Protestant community of Dieppe to continue meeting in private. The governor understood the government was happy to ignore Protestants who did not disturb the public peace.

When a confession of faith was presented by the Protestants of Dieppe, Le Havre and Rouen, the document was set alight in front of the cathedral of Rouen on 12 June.

Catholic partisans were not adverse to violence in Rouen. The day after the burning of the confession of faith, the failure of the Protestants to put up the proper draping on their houses for Corpus Christi Day provoked a Catholic riot, the non-decorated houses subject to looting and other attacks. Protestants responded to the riot with a display of force, 2,000 of their number marching to the parlement for justice. The bailli of Rouen, the sieur de Villebon responded to this in turn with a march of his own in which he made his wish for Catholic ceremony to be observed clear. Villebon's fundamentalist attitude earned him rebuke from Lorraine who argued this approach to governing (with 'too much zeal') was putting the stability of the crown in danger. In August another riot followed in the city in retribution for Protestant interruptions of a sermon, with several casualties.

==== Brittany ====
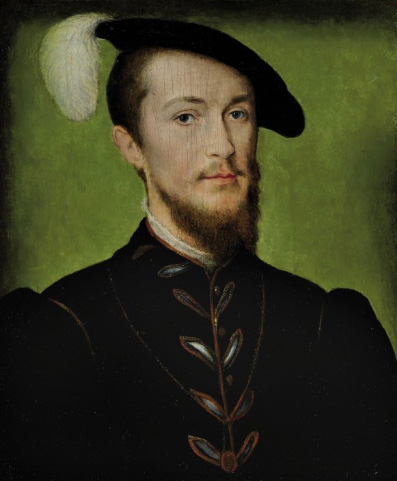
Duc d'Étampes, governor of Brittany

Suspecting that Maligny had taken refuge in Brittany with the hope of making his way across to England, Guise wrote to the governor of the province, the duc d'Étampes that no service he could perform could be greater than apprehending Maligny.

In May, Protestant gentleman and churchmen gathered at La Fonchaye to enter into a league to support one another with their 'goods and persons'.

In the panicked letters sent by the governor of Brittany to Guise at court, the governor reported on his concerns regarding England. On 16 June he announced that the English were assembling a force across the channel and that he could not see the only target of their force being Scotland. He therefore requested of the court more money for coastal defences. These warnings become more insistent in another letter on 20 July in which Étampes claimed that the English enterprise would soon be unleashed, and this was known to all, therefore it was imperative Brittany be secured. By contrast, Étampes noted that domestically there was little cause for concern in or around the province.

There would be a riot against Protestantism in Rennes.

==== Orléanais and Poitou ====
In further concerning developments in central France, both Orléans and Poitiers would be threatened by groups of armed men during September and October. Villars reported groups of armed men marching through Auvergne and the mountains of the Forez towards Poitiers in October. Around 100 armed horseman were spotted in the area arousing the fury of François. He further reported, on 21 October, that there were around 1,100 soldiers in the Vivarais who bragged that they would induce an even bigger rebellion than those of Amboise and Lyon.

After a tense meeting at court on 5 October a contingent of troops was moved into Poitiers for the security of the city.

A contested burial in Niort saw a group of 800 armed Protestants exhume a body which had been buried in the Catholic fashion so that they might bury it in the Protestant style while ringing the bells of the city. The lieutenant-general of Poitou the comte du Lude protested to Guise about this 'travesty of justice'.

==== Anjou ====
In Angers, a group of Protestant nobles took the lead in establishing a cache of weapons such that the celebrations of the last supper would resemble a military watch. A former associate of La Renaudie, La Chesnaye undertook various disorders across Anjou with a band of rebels. During October Montpensier busied himself repressing the Protestants of the city.

==== Touraine ====
During October, the prisons of Tours and Amboise were both stormed, with those imprisoned in them on account of their religion forcibly released. Tours (along with Orléans) would reject the imposition of royal compagnies d'ordonnance at the instigation of the Bourbon princes.

==== Aunis ====
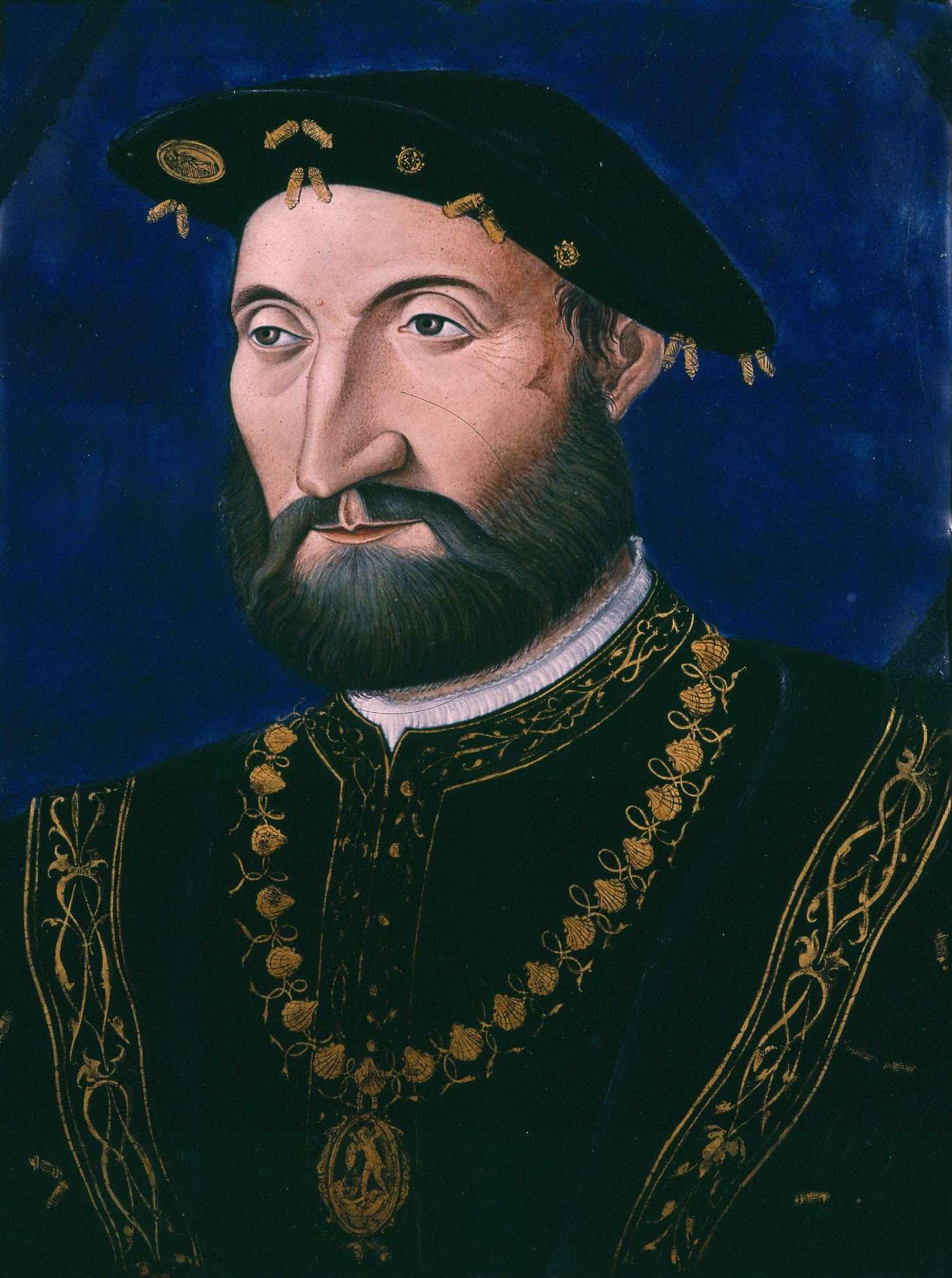
Baron de Jarnac, governor of La Rochelle and the pays d'Aunis

The governor of La Rochelle, the baron de Jarnac reported in September that ministers were working the countryside convincing people to disobey the king, and were planning on a meeting towards the end of the month at which they would carry out their illicit intentions.

==== Guyenne ====
In Bordeaux there was vicious factional conflict between two street troupes, named the 'basoche' and the 'écoliers', the former composed of young parlementaires while the latter comprised students of the collėge de Guyenne. By the 1550s hatred between them had become religious in character, with the humanism of the collège de Guyenne establishing a Protestant character among the écoliers while the basoche became the defenders of Catholic orthodoxy. By 1559 both groups patrolled the city in gangs, engaging in armed skirmishes. In May 1560 a group of écoliers on route to disrupt a Catholic service were intercepted by the city guard. However, they outnumbered the guard and in the fight that followed the guard required the support of the garrison of the château du Hâ, who were able to limit their casualties. After this clash, the parlement banned the écoliers from assembling in front of the collège de Guyenne. The collège however enjoyed the patronage of Navarre, who reacted furiously to the decision, and forced the rescinding of the measure against the écoliers. In the parlement a compromise was reached by which the écoliers would have their censuring reviewed, in return for the investigation of Protestant assemblies in the city.

In the wake of these troubles between May and September the crown sanctioned the deployment of parlementaire lawyers to support the city guard. The lieutenant of Bordeaux the comte d'Escars wished to take this royal directive further and make the town guard responsible for the walls and gates Catholic only. He was opposed in this by the lieutenant-general of Guyenne the seigneur de Burie who thought such a sectarian militia would be compromising. Burie's moderation aroused the indignation of some radical Catholics who complained to the crown that he was incompetent and failing to take the appropriate steps to protect the province. Burie appealed to Catherine in turn defending his services and asking that the author of the complaint against him be detained.

During June, it was reported that the nephew of the executed baron de Castelnau had raised 100 men to avenge the death of his uncle, with instructions for each of the hundred to raise a hundred in turn. A memorandum produced by an agent of the crown stated that the capital of the duché d'Albret (Nérac) was the nucleus for efforts to recruit soldiers throughout the spring and summer. These men were to rendezvous at Poitiers on 11 November. It was desired that any action be delayed until such time as the Pyrénées were impassable from snow, to inhibit Spain coming to the aid of the French crown.

==== Languedoc ====
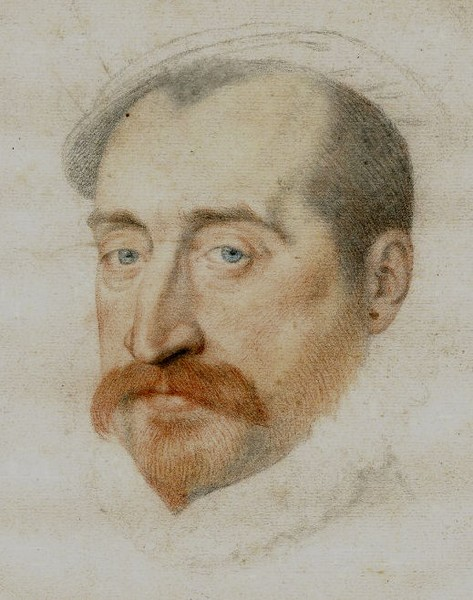
Vicomte de Joyeuse, lieutenant-general in Languedoc

In Languedoc, the lieutenant-general, the vicomte de Joyeuse reported on 5 September that there were 1,200 deserters from royal service terrorising the countryside from a base in the mountains of the Velay and Gévaudan. Their bands assaulted churches, and destroyed the material artefacts of Catholicism. According to Joyeuse they were on their way to Lyon. Three days later he added that a further 800–1,000 armed men had departed from Montpellier and Nîmes, while 300 were lurking around Valvignères. There was dispute as to their destination, be it Lyon the court or to confront La Motte-Gondrin. Between 19 and 21 October around Montpellier sixty churches were destroyed and many Catholics killed.

The number of Protestants in Toulouse had reached the point by 1560 that the parlement of the city felt it necessary to establish a chambre extraordinaire (extraordinary chamber) for their prosecution to clear the backlog of cases. The Catholic dominated parlement, sénéchaussée and vigurie (two lesser courts responsible for policing and security) clashed with the Protestant aligned capitouls that represented the civic government of Toulouse. The présidial court took a moderate Catholic line and therefore clashed with the parlement of the city.

The university of Toulouse proved a centre for militant Protestantism, organising itself into bands with captains which gave it the character of a militia. Through 1560 armed bands of students roamed the streets of the city, disrupting Catholic services and attacking property. They were confronted by the 'basoche' (actors and musicians who performed for Catholic ceremonies) and members of the confraternities. The basoche led attacks on the Protestants in the streets and made sure to report every Protestant transgression to the authorities so that they might install more repressive measures.

No sooner had the edict of Amboise been issued than public Protestant worship began in Nîmes. The consuls were sympathetic (or converted) to Protestantism but unwilling to tolerate public preaching that violated the law. The présidial court announced that illicit assemblies and bearing arms were prohibited. The court wrote to the lieutenant-general of Languedoc the vicomte de Joyeuse asking for him to aid them. Joyeuse arrived on 24 April and demanded an account of affairs from the présidial court. He further announced it was his intention to put an end to the carrying of arms and illegal assemblies. Joyeuse then wrote to the king expressing his dissatisfaction at both the Nîmois court and the town council. On 20 May the présidial met and issued arrest warrants for a list of Protestants, however word got out and all the named parties fled. Joyeuse congratulated the city for the action, while the Constable de Montmorency (the governor of Languedoc) wrote that he was considering imposing a garrison on the city for the failures of the arrest warrants to be successfully executed.

After Romorantin, the attitude of the elite of Nîmes to Protestantism again liberalised. Public preaching began once more. Rumours began to swirl that a royal garrison was to be imposed on Nîmes and the council wrote apprehensively about the prospect to the duc de Guise who responded evasively. The council and présidial court began nervously pointing the finger at each other as to whose responsibility it was to lead the repression of 'heresy', hoping to avert the imposition of a royal garrison. During September, several hundred Protestants marched out of the city under the command of a lawyer named Guillaume de Sauzet according to the lieutenant-general Joyeuse. That same month the council agreed to write to Joyeuse, informing him of the situation in the city. The letter was generous to the Protestants, letting Joyeuse know they had not been causing seditions. Joyeuse wrote back disapprovingly, chiding Nîmes' council for their liberal position, informing them 400 soldiers were on their way to restore order. This only furthered the defiance of Nîmes, the council going as far as to write to Joyeuse that the level of disorders had actually decreased in the city as Protestantism grew. Nevertheless, as the military presence in the province grew, the council conceded to the pressure on 22 October and made a new declaration against illegal assemblies. The vicomte de Cheylane arrived as the new governor, it became apparent to him the council was actively resisting his efforts.

The marquis de Villars menaced the countryside around Nîmes with bloody destruction and caused many families to take refuge in the mountains and woods. In writing to Montmorency, Villars identified two nobles that he identified as responsible for the troubles of the province (the seigneur de Saint-Jean de Gardonnenque and the sieur de Cardet). These men were associated with the comte de Crussol.

On 23 November, the deputy to the bishop of Nîmes devised a plan to bring Nîmes into line. A special election to replace the consuls would be held with only Catholics permitted to vote. The new governor the vicomte de Cheylane was pleased at this plan and happy to support its execution. While in the short term a more agreeable council was produced, it allowed the Protestant opposition to portray the crown as tyrannically overstepping urban privileges.

Gaillac would bear witness to an anti-Protestant riot.

During the summer of 1560, the Protestants seized the church of Saint-Jacques in Montauban.

Montpellier was seized by rebel Protestants to cries of 'Navarre! Navarre! Liberty! Liberty!', with the Catholic magistrates driven from the city.

Saint-André was dispatched by Villars to secure Montpellier for the royalists. Saint-André arrived in the city with three companies of infantry on 15 October. Upon his arrival the Protestants fled from Montpellier and the bishop re-emerged. To further the pacification of the province, Villars appointed Saint-André and Cheylane as governors of Nîmes, Montpellier and Aigues-Mortes. The Protestant pastor of Aigues-Mortes was hanged, and those rebel nobles who had departed from the city had their residences razed.

In judicial summons the Protestants of Montpellier were accused of various transgressions. Among them was the seizure of the church of Saint-Mathieu, assaulting the gates of the bishops residence, establishing their own night watch, captains and attending public preaching and aiding the attempted seizure of Lyon. A garrison was imposed on the city with a tax imposed on the Protestant households of the city to pay for it.

During February 1560 an insurrection in Montségur led to several weeks of destruction after which the town was left in ruins.

Alarmed by what was transpiring in nearby Montségur, and the guard was put on high alert in case Protestants attempted to besiege the city, Navarre acceding to the cities request to do this. The seigneur de Monluc was invited to the city in late February and he urged caution from the city grandees. A local teacher was arrested on suspicion of Protestantism, and tried in the city.

After the arrest of two of their preacher in May for inciting attacks on members of the présidial court, the Protestants of Agen took up arms towards his release. It became necessary to deploy the guard around the prison, but both ministers escaped. Monluc led forces to suppress the unrest and affirmed the arrest of the preachers as in line with the king's edicts. In revenge he was besieged in his residence at Estillac by angry Protestants. Navarre was furious at Monluc and the jurade (town council) of Agen for overstepping their authority. The re-arrested minister was transferred to Bordeaux to be tried there.

In June, word arrived that a Protestant force from Nérac was approaching with the intent of sacking the cathedral of Agen. Local grandees were summoned to prepare a response. It was agreed to form a military council for their defence, that would surveil Protestant activity in Agen and deploy a militia force in emergencies. Permission was sort from the crown by Monluc, François responded with an ambiguous endorsement of their zeal, without endorsing their coalition, even floating the idea of bi-confessional chambers. The Protestants of Agen took up this idea and began demanding its implementation, attacking churches and Catholic homes to this end.

==== Provence ====
The seigneur de Mauvans led his forces in Provence on an anti-Papal campaign. He first attempted to besiege Pertuis and when word arrived of the failure of the main Amboise conspiracy he moved to the Durance to achieve juncture with Montbrun. With prices on their heads some of his soldiers began to desert. Meanwhile, the royal lieutenant La Garde visited in turn Sisteron, Manosque, Forcalquier, Pertuis and Mérindol trying to sooth the places of their agitation, and see to the readmittance of Protestants so that they would not join with the rebels outside the walls. Once it became clear L'Hôpital was striking a moderate course, Mauvans began recruiting again, adding 500 Vaudois from Cabrières to his numbers. He sacked Castellane, Entrevaux, Colmars and La Baume-de-Sisteron. By July the possibility of his arrest was becoming increasingly inevitable. Having failed to surprise Sisteron, he was cornered by the governor of Provence, the comte de Tende. He capitulated on the condition of safe conduct for his men, and decided to retire to Castellane with 100 horseman. He therefore dispersed his forces (who would continue to operate without him) and appealed for refuge in Geneva on 9 July. This request for refuge was promptly granted, and Mauvans would reside in Geneva for an indeterminate time, though he was back in France by 1562.

==== Dauphiné ====
With the initial disorders in Dauphiné in the spring, Guise the governor of the province, was unsatisfied with the repressive efforts of his lieutenant, Antoine de Clermont, and replaced him with La Motte-Gondrin as lieutenant-general, his own brother the grand prieur and a force under the seigneur de Maugiron. This force successfully recaptured Valence from the rebels on 20 April and looked to 'punish the rebels of the city' (the parlement overseeing some executions), several Protestant preachers had placards hung round their neck reading 'here is the leader of the rebels' before they were beheaded. The royal army moved on and conducted a contested entry into Montélimar. The Protestants of Montélimar were disarmed, while others fled into the mountains of the Vivarais. Guise further requested his brother Aumale bring forces into Dauphiné from Burgundy, this was done by Tavannes in his absence.

A while later, the seigneur de Maugiron would lead a punitive expedition against the Vaudois of Freissinières and Pragelato.

The Protestant rebel leader Montbrun attempted to undertake an invasion of the 'Comtat Venaissin' a Papal territory within the borders of France. In service of this aim he enlisted the support of Protestants from the principality of Orange (a neighbouring independent territory). While in Nyons, Montbrun could count on 300 horseman. A resident of Avignon named Guillotin promised him support in bringing the Comtat Venaissin into the French fold. He was to capture Vaison for Montbrun but he failed. Meanwhile Malaucène was betrayed to the Protestant warlord on 5 August. Montbrun successfully undertook the seizure of several villages, accompanied by a preacher. In each one he established Protestant worship.

The royal defence was led by the lieutenant-general La Motte-Gondrin. La Motte-Gondrin had to make do without royal funds to support the suppression of the rebellion. He received a boon when the Papal Legate leant him 12,000 écus d'or (gold crowns). He marched on Bollène where he waited for support from Papal troops. Together they approach Orange with 4,500 men and secure the city, imposing a fine on the grandees of Orange for their support of Montbrun. Moving on from Orange they approached Malaucène but the Protestants had already decamped and were marching northwards. When approached by the baron de Castres, Montbrun opined that his 'superiors' who were of a very great house had instructed them to retire for now. At this time Montbrun and Mauvans were separated, with the latter heading to Draguignan where his brother had been murdered, putting the town to the sword. The baron de La Garde deployed soldiers along the Rhône to ensure there was no linkage established between the rebels being raised in Languedoc and those under Montbrun or Mauvans. Montbrun himself had to take on a disguise as a peasant, and narrowly avoided capture as he fled to take refuge in Geneva. As with Mauvans, he would return to France in the future to continue the fight. After his departure, the châteaux de Montbrun and Reilhamette were razed.

Unlike his contemporary Mauvans, Montbrun conducted his campaign with a fanatic drive towards extermination. Upon capturing Mornas, he slaughtered the Catholic woman and children of the town alongside the garrison.

==== Lyonnais ====
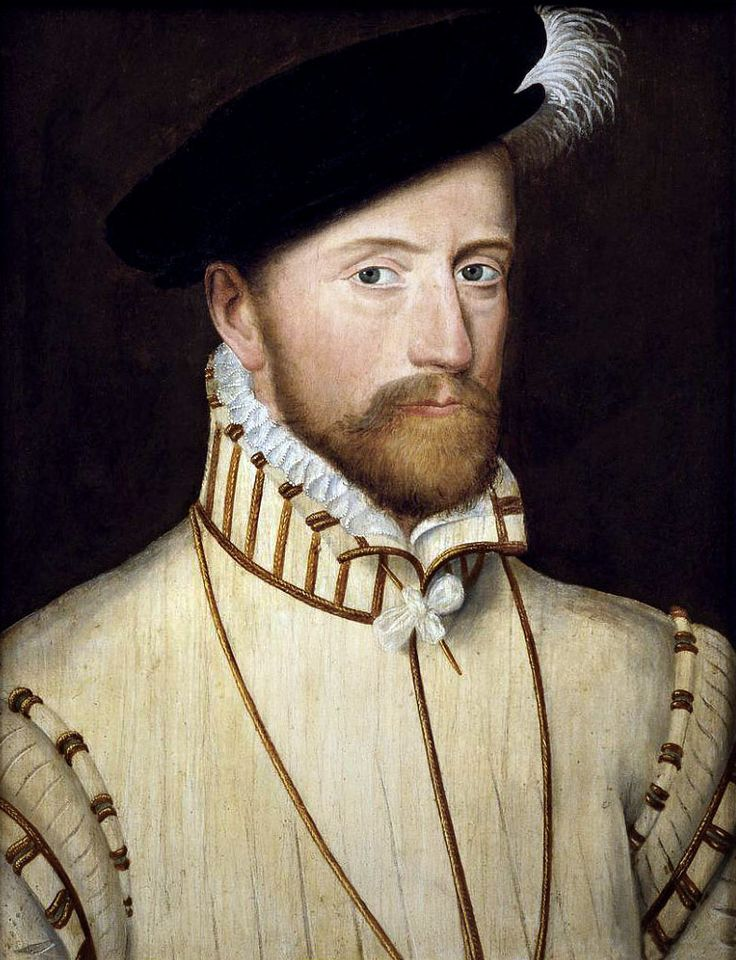
Marshal de Saint-André, governor of the Lyonnais and favourite of Henri II

Lyon was an attractive prize for the Amboise rebels, it was the second city of the kingdom, and its capture before the convening of an Estates General could prove a valuable bargaining chip to impose a settlement on the crown. It would also be a valuable centre for the Protestants of Dauphiné, Burgundy and the Rhône valley. According to the Lorraine administration's spies, it was Jean Darut, a merchant of Swiss extraction who was the leader of rebellious plans in the city. According to their spies Darut was in league with the king of Navarre for the capture of Lyon. Montbrun and Mauvans were also party to the plan, hoping it would form the nucleus for their southern project by its capture. This captured southern land would be fortified and then host an 'Estates General' by which the government and religion of the state would be overturned. The intermediary between Navarre and Darut was Maligny, who had been present for the conspiracy of Amboise. He arrived in Lyon in August and was followed by around 500 conspirators by September. The leader of these 500 was a captain Le Peyrault, who awaited the signal to seize the city. Navarre had second thoughts, and urged the conspirators to depart and regroup in Limoges where they could link up with him as he marched north. However, well aware of what was transpiring, the deputy governor of Lyon, Antoine d'Albon, abbot of Savigny (cousin of the marshal) had located an arms depot on the rue Longue and dispatched some arquebusiers to take over the depot. The Protestant rebels bested the arquebusiers, pushing them across to the right bank of the Saône, but lacked orders on how to proceed, and fearing they had been compromised fled in the night on 3 September. The next day the gates of the city were shut and searches undertaken.

The deputy governor urged that aid in the preservation of Lyon be given by La Motte-Gondrin and Maugiron (who would bring 300 arquebusiers to the city), the lieutenant-general of Burgundy Tavannes and the comte de Montréval, lieutenant to the duke of Savoy in Bresse. Savoy's lieutenant brought Savoyard troops to the gates of Lyon. Those conspirators who had stayed behind were captured and hanged, many of them implicating the king of Navarre during interrogation. Two prisoners were of particular note. Gilles Triou who was interrogated on 7 September confessed everything he knew, and his testimony would later be used in the conviction of Condé. The other was a former page of Condé who refused to say anything, but whose presence was viewed as evidence enough. Benedict also argues for the involvement of Calvin and Bèze in the conspiracy, arguing that although for the Genevans it was not an ideal conspiracy, it was still an effort worth financing.

After the arrest of a pair of the Lyon conspirators in Bresse (one of whom was a Genevan), a group of residents of Geneva departed the city to make towards Bresse. The council of Geneva became panicked that they might engage in violent action that implicated the city in the failed coup in Lyon and sent out orders for their arrests. The council then engaged in negotiations with Bresse, and secured the release of the captives into their custody. François and Guise were enraged against Geneva, suspecting the cities role in instigating the troubles in Lyon, Guise therefore proposed to the duke of Savoy that he invade the comté.

Saint-André arrived in Lyon with 5 compagnies on 20 September, alongside the cardinal de Tournon. The city was obliged to lodge them and the bourgeois of the city were subject to great pressures over the coming months.

=== Provincial reconfiguration ===
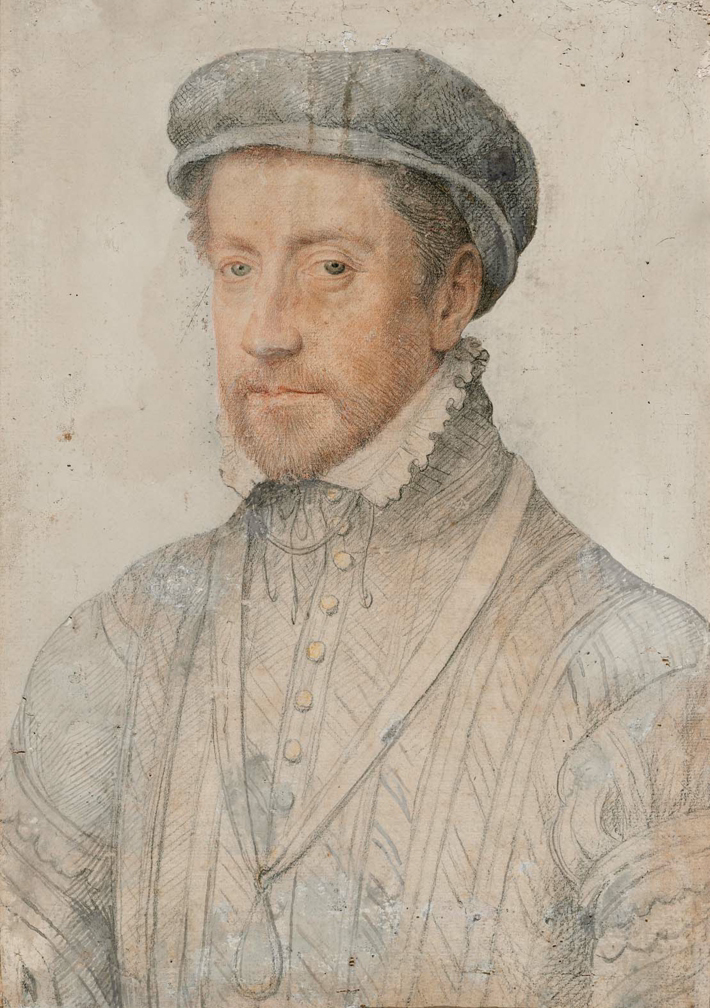
Duc de Montpensier, prince du sang and governor of Anjou, Touraine, Maine etc.

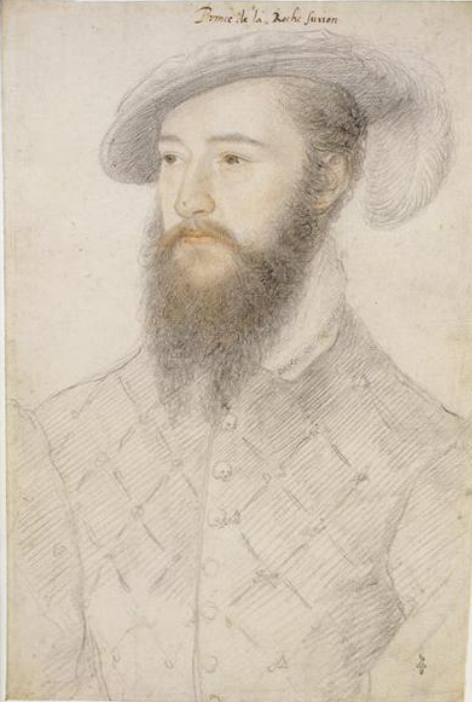
Prince de La Roche-sur-Yon governor of the Orléanais, Berry, Beauce

The Lorraine administration undertook a large scale consolidation of the interior governates in August 1560. Two super-governates were created. One composed of Anjou, Touraine, Maine, Perche, the Vendômois and Loudun, Blois, Laval and Amboise; the other comprised the Orléanais, Berry, Beauce, Montargis, and Chartres. The former was granted to the prince du sang the duc de Montpensier, the latter to his younger brother the prince de La Roche-sur-Yon. The premier prince du sang Navarre also received elevation, having Poitou folded into his governate of Guyenne as a subordinate governorship. The area had been de facto under the control of the governors of Guyenne since the time of Navarre's father in law. Letters patent to this effect were given to him in late spring. By this means, Guise and his brother hoped to show themselves to their critics as defenders of the rights of the princes du sang, and maintain relations with the group despite freezing the princes out of government. At this time Montpensier under the influence of his wife Jacqueline undertook a policy of moderate Catholicism. After her death he would develop a reputation for militant Catholicism. His lieutenant-general in this grand new charge would be the seigneur de Chauvigny a fidèle of Guise. La Roche-sur-Yon was provided with the sieur de Sipierre as his lieutenant-general, another Guise client who was responsible to him. The lieutenant-generals role was as much to supervise the governors as take orders from them.

Outside of these super-governates, Limousin was entrusted to the seigneur de Pontbriant and the Angoumois to the seigneur de Sansac. In October Coligny was granted the government of the port towns of Le Havre and Honfleur.

A further reward for Montpensier came in the form of the return of the final pieces of the Bourbon inheritance that had been seized from the constable de Bourbon in 1523, the Beaujolais and Dombes. The parlement of Paris baulked at this alienation of part of the royal domain but Lorraine pressured them to acquiesce.

In the coming year, Montpensier and La Roche-sur-Yon would take very different approaches to the matter of Protestants in their respective governates. La Roche-sur-Yon informed the Protestants of his territories that while he would not tolerate them assembling in public or their bearing of arms, he would not impede their conscience or force them to convert. He urged they contain their passions until such time they made up a large enough segment of the French population. Montpensier by contrast was summoned to court in 1561 for his refusal to release several hundred Protestants he had imprisoned in Chimonais.

=== New royal policy ===
A new chancellor was appointed on 20 June, Michel de l'Hôpital. Though he did not believe that Protestants and Catholicism could co-exist, he was of the understanding that Protestantism had grown to the point where it could not be wiped out without military force. Therefore, the only course to take was to focus the administration on reforming the church and judiciary. The new chancellor was an active thinker on matters of royal power, having recently composed a Latin treatise that took the form of an address to François upon his coronation. According to L'Hôpital the good king was one who, like Christ, was a 'prince of peace' who did not seek to shed either his own peoples or other peoples blood. L'Hôpital looked to god to be the architect of the reunification of the French church. Disconcerted by the violent opposition of Amboise, the Lorraine government assented to L'Hôpital replacing the recently deceased Olivier. Indeed, L'Hôpital owed his entry to the conseil privé to the patronage of Lorraine. Alongside the support of the Lorraine brothers he enjoyed Catherine's support, the queen mother seeing him as a moderate figure who was qualified for the position. In L'Hôpital's estimation it was god himself who had caused the king to remember him and afford him the office of chancellor. The Lorraine administration rewarded him in July with 10,000 livres so that he could buy suitable amenities for his new dignity.

Saint-André travelled south into Gascogne some time during July, nominally to spend some time in his lands there, but in fact so that he might spy on the Bourbons.

By a royal declaration on 6 August the parlement of Paris was allowed to hear cases on matters of illicit assemblies that had until this point been the purview of the présidial courts. By this means it was hoped to better establish public order and clamp down on public Protestant worship.

Guise and Lorraine were initially open to a proposal by the duke of Savoy who had announced his plan to invade and conquer Geneva. However, by July Lorraine wrote to Savoy announcing that France could no longer support this policy, arguing that the king was too focused on affairs in Scotland. Beyond this concern, an attack on Geneva risked a new European war and a full civil war in France. By September, Guise felt differently, and assured Savoy that he would in a personal capacity support an attack against Geneva with military force.

=== Assembly of Notables ===
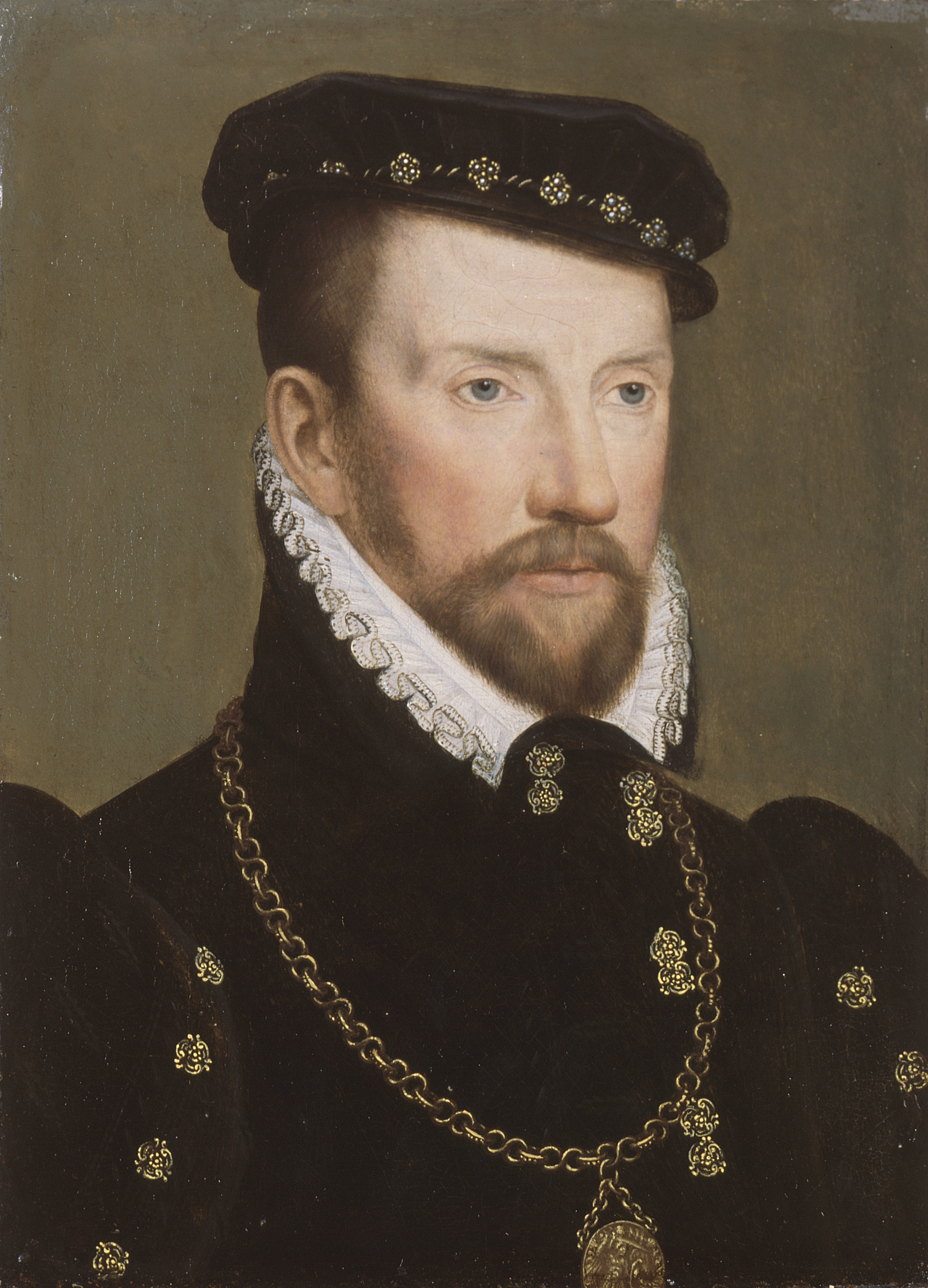
Admiral of France, and former governor of Picardy, Coligny who made his Protestant political debut at the Assembly of Notables

In August the crown decided to convoke an Assembly of Notables at Fontainebleau to resolve the kingdoms ills. In attendance from 21 to 26 August were 54 men, composed of the king's councillors, the princes du sang, the great officers of the crown, the maître des requêtes de l'hôtel (masters of requests) and chevaliers of the ordre de Saint-Michel. The four secrétaires d'État were also present, though their role was largely confined to note taking and the transmission of orders. Catherine, Marie Stuart and François were in attendance. Of the six Lorraine brothers, all but the grand prieur were present. Also attending were: Montmorency, two of his sons and all three of his Châtillon nephews; the ducs de Nevers, Longueville, Montpensier; the prince de La Roche-sur-Yon; marshals Saint-André, Brissac and Thermes; the cardinal de Bourbon, the archbishop of Vienne, the bishops of Orléans and Valence; the seigneurs de Gonnor, Vielleville, Sansac (all three who would go on to become marshals) and Gonzague (future duc de Nevers). The proceedings took place in the chambers of Catherine, which Durot sees as symbolic of the changing balance of political power. To ensure a majority present supported the crowns plans, a new batch of chevaliers were elevated to the ordre shortly before the Assembly was convened.

Neither Condé or Navarre were present to represent their interests at the Assembly of Notables, despite the urgings of Montmorency for them to join him there. The crown itself had made appeals for their presence through the despatch of the sieur de Carrouges to Guyenne on 3 August. Letters begging for them to come were sent by both Catherine and Guise, the latter saying that Navarre's 'prudent and wise advise' was desperately needed. For the Lorraine brothers, there was confidence that the Bourbons would either ignore the summons, or if they did in fact arrive be too timid to challenge the majority of François. Upon the return of Carrouges and Saint-André to court, the latter explained he was unable to divine the intentions of the Bourbon princes, while the former brought letters from Navarre in which Navarre explained he could not be present in time for the assembly so they should begin without him, he further made recriminations against injustices directed at him. This failure to attend weakened the argument of the Bourbon-Vendôme princes that they were being unjustly excluded from the government. Further, François, Catherine and Montmorency were offended by his failure to listen to their respective summons. Montmorency himself arrived in grand style with his three Châtillon nephews, his cousin the marquis de Villars and 800 horsemen in his escort as a show of his power. He received warm greetings from the king, the queen mother and Guise, who embraced him.

The assembly was opened with speeches from Catherine who encouraged those present to ensure that royal authority was maintained and that the problems that afflicted the country were soothed. Catherine hoped that the assembly would show the libels that accused the king of being a puppet of the Lorraine brothers to be false. The new chancellor L'Hôpital then spoke. He characterised the assembly as a combination of the First (clergy) and Second (nobility) Estate, without the presence of the third, whose troubles they would sooth through their discussions. As Catherine had, he urged the assembled delegates to fix the ills of the state. Reports followed from both the duc de Guise and cardinal de Lorraine in which they updated the Assembly on the matters of state as concerned their areas of the government. In his address, Lorraine informed those assembled that the annual budget deficit was now around 2,500,000 livres. With this accomplished, the assembled delegates now had the floor.

The Assembly devolved into angry recriminations over the need for reform and religious matters. This was after Coligny, who had returned from the mission Catherine gave him, presented two petitions (one to the king, one to Catherine) from the Protestants of Normandy on 23 August in which they asked for the suspension of persecution and the provision of temples. The petitions went so far as to analogise the treatment of Protestants and Jews, arguing that the latter although "abominable before god" had been afforded temples for their worship in several parts of the Christian world for the sake of peace, therefore how much more worthy of temples are those who recognise Christ as lord. Coligny justified the request for temples by highlighting that it was the lack of them that caused disorder, with Protestants moving under armed guard to sites of worship outside where there was more likely to be confrontations with Catholics. François responded generously to Coligny's petitions, praising the admiral for his good conduct. Guise commented that religious toleration of Protestantism would bring about the damnation of the king. He further noted that the petition was unsigned, beginning a dispute between the two men at the assembly. Coligny informed Guise that he could get ten thousand signatures if needs be, to which Guise rejoindered he could get 100,000 for a counterpetition, chief among them his own. He further added that no council would separate him from his faith in the sacrament, though he granted that he would leave matters of doctrine to the prelates. Coligny further complained that it was not possible to approach or petition the king. This complaint was directed at the condition of the king, who was surrounded by a company of arquebusiers under the command of Richelieu 'Le Moine'. It was also taking aim at the cancellation of the royal tour of the kingdom that had been planned at the beginning of the year. Guise rejoindered that such precautions were a necessity due to the recent conspiracy, which although it protested to only target the king's advisers, in fact would target the king as his advisers had not been in error.

Calls went out at the Assembly from the Protestant sympathetic archbishop of Vienne, bishop of Orléans and bishop of Valence for an Estates General and General council of the church. The bishop of Orléans denounced the corruption of the Catholic church, and stated that it was little wonder so many were attracted to Protestantism with the French church in such a state. The bishop of Valence argued that it was pointless to fight the flames that consumed the French church with 'waters from the Tiber' when one could do so with 'waters from the Seine', by which he meant a national council over a general council. The Cardinal de Tournon grated at the metaphor. The archbishop of Vienne argued that given the Pope was so reticent to hold a general council of the church, it was only proper to hold a national one. It would also be necessary for an Estates General to resolve the ills of the kingdom. The Lorraine government was favourable to these proposals with both Lorraine and Guise endorsing the plans, the former proposing an investigation into ecclesiastical corruption to prepare the way. Lorraine further stated that the state would leave alone those whose only crime was the practice of Protestantism peaceably, while continuing to persecute those who cause seditions and disruptions. It would be the job of the bishops to win back the peaceable Protestants to the Roman church. The next day the chevaliers of the ordre de Saint-Michel voiced their agreement with the positions outlined by Lorraine, and the assembly began to wind down. A majority voted in favour of these proposals on 31 August. It was agreed to host an Estates General, with the plan being for it to meet at Meaux, though this location would be changed to Orléans on 2 October. Chancellor L'Hôpital was pleased to see the Estates General convened, seeing it as a means by which the king could throw down the screen of relying on advisors to tell him what is going on his kingdom by affording him access to the entirety of his people. The Assembly had also established that governors and judiciary officials were only to seek out Protestants when they were involved in sedition (i.e. meeting under arms).

As an interim measure until such time the bodies would convene, an edict was issued prohibiting any subject of the king from raising either troops or money. By this means it was hoped disorders would lessen.

The institution of the Estates General had not been called since the time of Louis XI, though lesser Estates had been called in 1506 and 1558 respectively without the full presence of the Third Estate or a process of elections.

Lorraine believed in the possibility of a religious reunification of the kingdom. It was due to this that he supported the convocation of a national council, with the Protestants invited, to bring about religious unity. The Spanish king Philip was infuriated when word reached him of the plan for a national council. In contrast to his brother, for Guise the necessity of this pseudo-toleration due to the political realities of the kingdom went strongly against his convictions. It was to be a pause for the moment before the kingdom could return to a unified Catholic orthodoxy.

The gestures towards at least temporary toleration made at the Assembly of Notables, induced juridical chaos. While Lorraine was saying that Protestants who were peaceful should be left in peace, none of the persecutory edicts of the 1550s had been revoked. Therefore, the courts were left with contradictory instructions. On 23 August, François ordered the lieutenant-general of Poitou to adopt a religious policy of gentle remonstrance. The sénéschal of Poitou Montpézat would complain to the crown about this conflicting policy the following year. Likewise the bishop of Riez protested to Lorraine in November that he needed clarity so he could know how to avoid deviating from royal intentions either by too great a severity or too great a laxity.

On 29 November, the Pope announced his intention to recall the council of Trent to resume its sessions in April 1561. This was a great disappointment to both Lorraine and Catherine who were hoping for a new general council of the church. Lorraine was at this time viewed with considerable suspicion by both Spain and the Papacy, and furthered their distrust with his continual sending of missives to Rome arguing for a new council that could satisfy the Lutherans as opposed to a continuation of Trent. For Philip, the possibility of a religious council between France, the Emperor and the German Protestant princes was to be avoided at all costs, for the risk it might pose to Spanish control of the Netherlands.

Lorraine saw to the organisation for a grand double marriage which was celebrated at Saint-Germain-en-Laye in the first week of October. At this double marriage, the duc de Nevers was remarried. At the same time the young prince de Porcien was married to Nevers' daughter Catherine. All the French princes attended the event, described by Carroll as the 'most glittering social occasion of the year' with the exception of Navarre and Condé. Porcien was an open Protestant and Nevers occupied an ambiguous position between Geneva and Rome.

=== Navarre and Condé ===
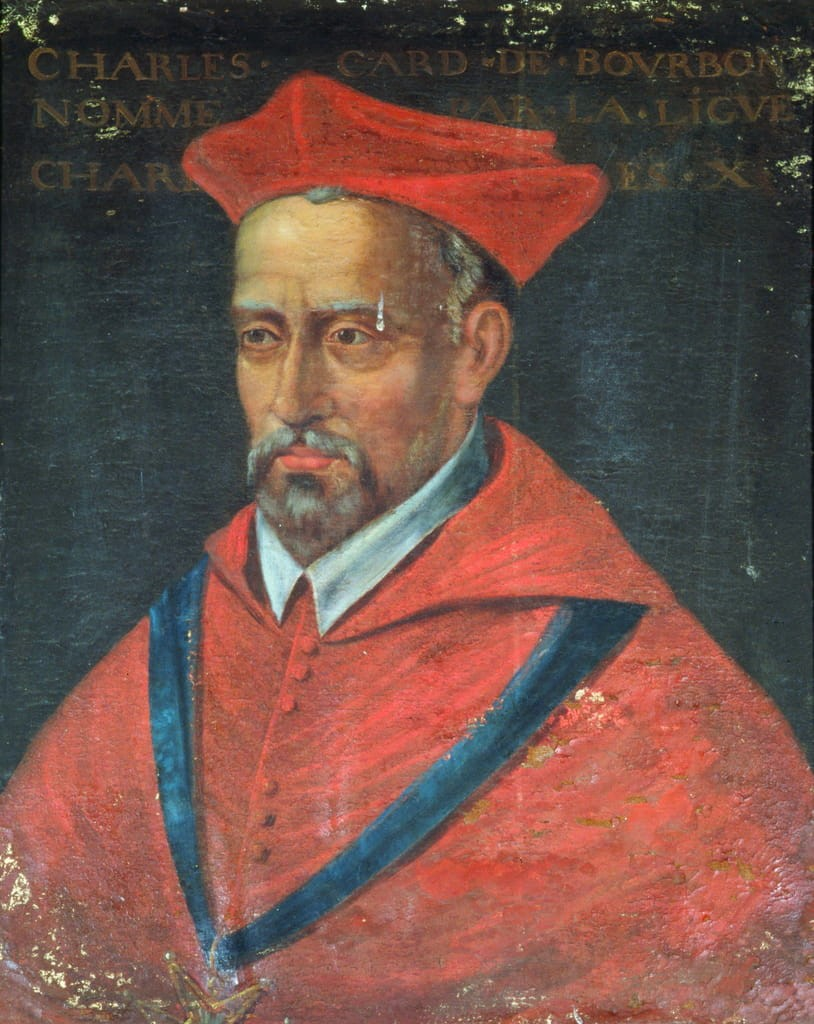
Brother of the rebel princes the cardinal de Bourbon

Requests were dispatched from the court asking for the presence of Navarre and Condé. It was hoped that the increasingly rebellious actions of the princes could be contained from spreading if they were kept close to the crown. In June and July the princes met with the elder Maligny brother who had been involved in the conspiracy of Amboise. At this time Navarre hinted to Catherine that there was a risk of civil war if the crown did not support him in his efforts to gain his kingdom back from Philip II.

On 26 August, an agent of Condé's, named Jacques de La Sague was picked up by a Guisard captain while in Étampes. La Sague had recently visited Chantilly, Paris and the court distributing letters. He had documents on his person that implicated both Navarre and Condé in a new plotted uprising. Soldiers were to be raised, salaries paid, relations undertaken with the Protestants of the Empire. Under torture he implicated several others who were close to them. Indirectly implicated were the governor of Provence the comte de Tende, the lieutenant-general of Guyenne, Burie; the future lieutenant-general of Guyenne, Monluc the lieutenant-general of Picardy, Sénarpont; and several great Protestant lords. Monluc's presence among the accused could be considered surprising considering his later reputation, but in 1560 there were rumours of his contacts with Navarre and attendance of Protestant services. In the letters in La Sague's possession Condé called for support in opposing the Lorraine government from Constable Montmorency and the vidame de Chartres, the former having demurred while the latter offered his support for a 'worthy enterprise in the name of the king' and he was therefore promptly locked in the Bastille on 29 August. The prince de Condé further looked for financial aid from Elizabeth of England, but now that her Scottish ambitions had been satisfied, she had less need of the proposal. On 31 August François wrote to the duke of Savoy with specific information about captains who were to be raised under Condé's banner, with Navarre also implicated in the plans.

With the failure of the first attempts at summons, the princes brother the Cardinal de Bourbon was sent by Catherine to bring them to court arriving in the south on 2 September. His appeal failed. A request was sent to Philip II on 31 August so that he might menace Navarre with his troops, a prospect he responded to favourably on 13 September. Thus the rebellious princes would be caught between the royal and Spanish armies. Navarre was suitably chastened by the Spanish moves towards his jure uxoris (by the rights of his wife) lands. Finally the seigneur de Crussol, Catherine's chevalier d'honneur was sent on 31 August with an ultimatum for them to attend the upcoming Estates General. Crussol was chosen both due to his loyalty to the crown and his perceived Protestant leanings which were felt to make him more acceptable to the princes. He arrived to deliver it on 9 September and they agreed to make their way north. Crussol was told to inform Navarre that his rebellious indiscretions had been revealed to the court by the Montmorency. To this was added the information on the arrest of the vidame de Chartres. By this means it was hoped a wedge would be driven between the two parties. Crussol returned to court on 19 September and informed the crown the princes would arrive before September was concluded, Bourbon meanwhile, who arrived back on 28 September estimated the renegade princes would not arrive until 20 October. François was greatly frustrated by news that their arrival would be so delayed, as it contravened his instruction for their arrival.

Catherine put Philip II of Spain and the duke of Savoy on standby in case there was a great showdown between the crown and the princes. Both Philip and Savoy had a vested interest in opposing Protestant conspiracy in France, the former didn't want his subjects in the Netherlands to be witness to any international encouragement from France, meanwhile Savoy was keen to see Geneva restored to his domains. On 13 September, a favourable response was returned by Philip to the prospect of menacing Navarre. A week later, on 21 September, an envoy arrived at the French court, and it was agreed that Philip would amass a force of around 8,000 soldiers on the French border. This envoy also took the opportunity to protest against the prospect of a national council of the French church, but François defended the project, arguing repression had accomplished nothing but destabilising his kingdom. Nevertheless the duke of Alburquerque mobilised forces in Spanish controlled Navarre in support of putting pressure on the Bourbon princes.

The decision of Navarre and Condé to attend court was made despite the warning of their wives Jeanne d'Albret (Navarre) and Éléonore de Roye (Condé). De Bèze counselled that they do all they could to ensure the upcoming Estates General would hold the Guise government to account. Other advisers assured him that men would rise up across France to ensure he held a strong hand at the Estates. The two rebel princes departed sometime after 17 September. An army of nobles agglomerates around them as they march north. Navarre and Condé hoped that by this means they would overawe the court and establish a settlement favourable to themselves at the Estates General, to this end they encouraged Maligny and Montbrun to unify with them in Limoges. Through late September and early October bands of soldiers from the Midi (around 3–4,000) made their way towards Poitou and Limousin, with around 800 gentleman arriving in the latter. Aware of this, the king entrusted d'Escars and the comte de Ventadour with ensuring unrest was suppressed in Limousin. A further 6,000 footmen from Gascogne were ready to join him in marching north if he gave the order. De Bèze initially travelled with the princes as they marched north, but warned of the danger that lied ahead, he slipped away during the crossing of central France. Fearful that their procession to court might become a military march the cordon of royal troops were slowly introduced around the princes' party as they advanced. Navarre was outraged, upon his arrival at Chaunay in Poitou on 13 October to find Montpézat meet him with orders to deny his entry into the town, he protested to Catherine who assured him she had not ordered Montpézat's actions, but the sénéschal assured Navarre she had personally instructed him to follow this course. Navarre's party was shadowed by Marshal de Thermes, who had been granted command of eight compagnies d'ordonnance, with whom Navarre would enter dispute when he arrived at Poitiers. Navarre insulted by Thermes' demeanour, wrote to Catherine to get him to back off. Navarre, increasingly aware due to the surrounding royalist compagnies d'ordonnance that the government had retained the loyalty of a greater portion of the military nobility than he had counted on began to reduce the size of his entourage, and allow the firebrands with him to slip away. When the party of princes arrived at Châtellerault, those sympathetic to the princes cause offered to spirit them away to Anjou and the Norman ports, but Navarre begrudgingly determined to continue on to court.

=== Lèse majesté ===
François announced his intentions for the arrival of the princes on 5 October. He would "make [Navarre] know that I am king and have the power and means to make him obey me". All the chevaliers of the ordre de Saint-Michel (of whom there were around 40 present) and grandees of court were summoned to François' chambers to renew their oaths of loyalty to him, with Guise proclaiming that his life, those of his children and his property would be in service of the king. The king turned to Catherine and informed her that she too would be part of the war to come. Cardinal de Bourbon in tears plead that his brothers would be good servants of the king, to which François responded that if they were so, he would treat them as he would his parents, if not he would see them punished. At this time, it was declared by the crown that all provincial governors with the exception of Guise and Montmorency were to return to their charges. A full mobilisation of royal troops was undertaken. The arrière ban was declared. François ordered the Catholic nobility to put itself on a war footing in aid of combatting the disorders. The governor of Brittany, complained to Guise that the frequent declaration of the arrière ban would cause a deterioration in obedience to the summons, in combination with the problem of Protestant nobles. Four compagnies d'ordonnance were raised in the Touraine under the duc de Montpensier, five in the Orléanais under the prince de La Roche-sur-Yon, five in Champagne under the duc de Nevers, two in the Île de France under Marshal de Montmorency, six in the Lyonnais under Marshal de Saint-André, six in Picardy beneath Marshal de Brissac, a further six distributed across lower Normandy and Rouen. The commanders La Brosse and Sébastien de Luxembourg were instructed to bring their seasoned troops back from Scotland. Troops were stripped from the border fortresses, such as Saint-Quentin in Picardy, so that they might be turned to face the prospect of internal war. On 7 October, Montmorency departed court, unsatisfied with his treatment by the king. He had hoped to plead for clemency for the vidame de Chartres with Guise, only to be rebuked by the king that he desired to know too much. In combat of the conspiratorial efforts consuming the south of France, royal troops brutally pacified the Rhône valley. Protestant assemblies were dispersed, but they were treated as seditious rather than heretical, and there was no replication of the religious persecution of 1559. Protestants were not put to death for their faith. With this accomplished new unrests broke out in the south-west of the kingdom. The court also continued its efforts at church reform, with bishops being compelled to reside in their benefices. Progress was slow on this front, with Villars bemoaning a majority of Languedoc's bishops remained absentees.

Shortly before the court arrived in Orléans, the seigneur de Sipierre was despatched to enter first, and ensure that the city was secure. François arrived in Orléans for the upcoming Estates on 18 October, and set himself up in the hôtel. Orléans had been central during the conspiracy of Amboise and was very proximate to the duché de Vendôme, the Bourbon stronghold. Its central positioning in the kingdom made it ideal for a revolt that could cut the kingdom into two. Suspecting the Bourbon's plotted to do just that, François therefore pre-empted them by establishing both himself and the Estates in the city. Four companies of soldiers were brought into the city. The king declared that he would defend with force both his crown and life as necessary. On 29 October the court learned that Navarre and Condé were in Blois and would be imminently arriving, La Roche-sur-Yon, his son and the son of the duc de Montpensier set out to meet with their cousins.

Navarre and Condé arrived at court in Orléans on 30 October. They were greeted like rebels by the Lorraine government. There was no reception that would typically be granted to men of their rank. The city had been surrounded with troops for their arrival, and was under conditions not dissimilar from martial law. Many nobles had been summoned to the court for the sensitive manoeuvre that was to follow, with further inductions into the ordre de Saint-Michel (an unprecedented 18 promotions on 29 September), all of them clients of Guise, Montmorency and Catherine. Among those inducted were the sieur de Genlis - former master of Guise's household, the seigneur de La Motte-Gondrin - lieutenant general in Dauphiné; the seigneur de Beauvais-Nangis - commander of the town of Guise; the vicomte de Martigues and the comte de Crussol, Catherine's chevalier d'honneur. While many of these men were not clients of Guise or Lorraine at the time of their promotion, they largely had services that were useful to the administration. At this time Crussol was also inducted into the conseil privé. Entering the king's presence, Navarre and Condé had to navigate through the crowds of courtiers while being heaped with mocking jeers. Navarre spoke to the king first, saying the two men had come in obedience to the king and that Condé was keen to clear his name. François reservedly praised Navarre for his obedience and informed him he was not to leave court until the nature of his conduct had been cleared up. When Condé tried to imitate his brother, the king informed him that he had selected appropriate persons to judge his actions. François retired to his private quarters and then summoned the brothers to him, in this more private surround (where only Catherine, the king and Cardinal de Bourbon were present) Condé was accused of involvement in the conspiracy of Amboise, and uprisings in Bordeaux and Lyon. Condé angrily denounced the Lorraine government, while Navarre protested and the Cardinal de Bourbon cried. François silenced the protests, declaring to Navarre that the matter had been decided long ago. Condé was led away by two guards, and put under arrest. The Lorraine brothers ensured their distance from the arrest, only the marshals, Montpensier, and La Roche-sur-Yon signed the arrest warrant. The cardinal de Lorraine was reportedly left saddened by the arrest. The prince de Condé made appeals to the sieur de Genlis, knowing his closeness with Guise, hoping that he might intercede in his favour. Condé was moved to a house with barred windows which was guarded by cannons. The commander of his imprisonment was a certain 'captain Gohaz' who had served in Scotland under Martigues. His arrest was an international frustration for Protestants, with his German co-religionists grieving the matter. After several weeks under house arrest, he was put on trial on 13 November. Condé's mother in law, the comtesse de Roye was also arrested at Anizy-le-Château by the sieur de Carrouges on the charge of having concealed Maligny. Romier argues this "blunder" to arrest the half-sister of the Châtillon brothers and niece of Montmorency was the king's error. The baron de Jarnac was tasked with seeing to the arrest of Navarre's chancellor, Amaury Bouchart. It was viewed as necessary to ensure the conviction of Condé was a settled matter before the Estates could arrive and potentially upset the arrangement.

The product of the interrogations of Jacques de La Sague and Gilles Triou were presented to the judges. Saint-André brought prisoners to the city so that they might confront Condé. The prince did not initially recognise the cognisance of commissioners who were assigned to interrogate him, nor the authority of the council to judge him. Questioned by de Thou he refused to answer. He insisted that only a trial by all the peers of the realm (or the entirety of the Parlement alongside peers of the realm could be appropriate for a man of his status. He further suggested openly for the first time that the king was in fact a minor, and therefore the acts of the conseil privé were invalid. His interrogators accused him of lèse majesté to which he retorted with more denunciations directed against Guise. Despite the concerted efforts of Bourbon and Navarre to save their brother, and Éléonore (who had been released by Catherine) to save her husband, Condé was sentenced, possibly to death by the judges on 26 November (though two of his judges would not sign the sentence - L'Hôpital and du Mortier), with Guise and Lorraine keen to see this accomplished quickly as the king's health began to fail in November. Indeed, François had first passed out during vespers on 17 November. Lorraine responded to the failing health of the king by ordering processions and prayers be undertaken for his health, Guise meanwhile threatened to hang the king's doctors.

Romier contends that the notion of Condé being condemned to death is an invention of later Bourbon aligned historians. Thompson concurs with him that the most severe punishment Condé could expect was imprisonment in Loches for the rest of his life - as was the opinion of the Venetian ambassador. Durot simply argues that a sentence of death was not reached by the judges. Carpi by contrast argues that he was due to be executed on 10 December. Regardless, the reticence of all the judges to sign bought time for Condé. Catherine encouraged the reticent judges. There was also fears that a new Amboise conspiracy was being prepared to spring Condé from his captivity, timed to coincide with the meeting of the Estates General.

During the days of Condé's captivity, Navarre participated in the conseil des affaires, went hunting with the king, and while maintaining a belief in his brothers innocence allowed himself to build relations with the cardinal de Lorraine and Catherine. According to the Spanish ambassador, he was approached by the leader of a prospective rebellion in Grenoble, who boasted that he had 1,800 men near the city ready to fight for the gospel. However, according to the ambassador, Navarre keen to prove his loyalty quickly denounced the man to the court. In council on 20 November, he protested that two of his brothers had died in service of François I, proclaiming that the comte d'Enghien had given the king his most glorious day with the victory of Ceresole. Now the king's grandson desired Condé's blood. Catherine assured him that François II would subscribe to the judgement chosen by the princes judges, and Navarre calmed down, apologising for his outburst.

=== Death of the king ===
François II died on 5 December from a tumour that had developed behind his ear, having received extreme unction from the cardinal de Lorraine that day. In his chambers the following morning, Brissac, Longueville, Nemours, Étampes and Guise conducted mass, before departing to the residence of the new king. With François' brother, the nine year old Charles were Catherine, Marie Stuart and Navarre who swore their loyalty to the new king. First Guise and then Lorraine declared that they regretted the errors of the past but would only work towards the service of the king. Catherine reassured them that their actions had always been at the instruction of François. With the situation in the kingdom altered by François' death, Condé was quickly released from his imprisonment, being restored to freedom on 24 December. To preserve the dignity of the Lorraine brothers, it was declared that his imprisonment had been the sole will of the late king. Condé travelled first to La Fère, then to court where he was admitted on 15 March. He was declared rehabilitated by the Parlement of Paris on 13 June. In August he was officially reconciled with the duc de Guise in an official ceremony, though it could little disguise the hatred between the two men.

The vidame de Chartres by contrast was not released from his imprisonment. He died while still under guard at the hôtel des Tournelles on 22 December.

François did not receive a formal royal burial. Instead on 8 December his remains were transported by the prince de La Roche-sur-Yon under a gold canopy to the Sainte-Croix Cathedral in Orléans where his heart was enclosed in a lead casket. Protestants considered the king a tyrant for his treatment of Condé while Catholics believed him to have been weak. Within a month of the death of the king, La Roche-sur-Yon's own son the marquis de Beaupréau was also dead. This prompted the Spanish ambassador to remark that the first and last of the royal house were both taken in succession.

Much as they had celebrated the divine intervention of the death of Henri, some Protestants celebrated the miraculous death of François which had 'saved the life of Condé'. Poems were written in which his death was described as a divine punishment. Among those celebrating was the English ambassador, who looked forward to the prospect of the Châtillon-Montmorency faction regaining ascendency at court. From Geneva, Calvin wrote with exuberance on the timeliness of François' death, which was 'clearly a gift from god'. The Spanish ambassador meanwhile opined that it seemed like the court was going to be dominated by various noble families each seeking to advance the interests of their house, reducing the realm to chaos.

== Regency ==
=== New government ===
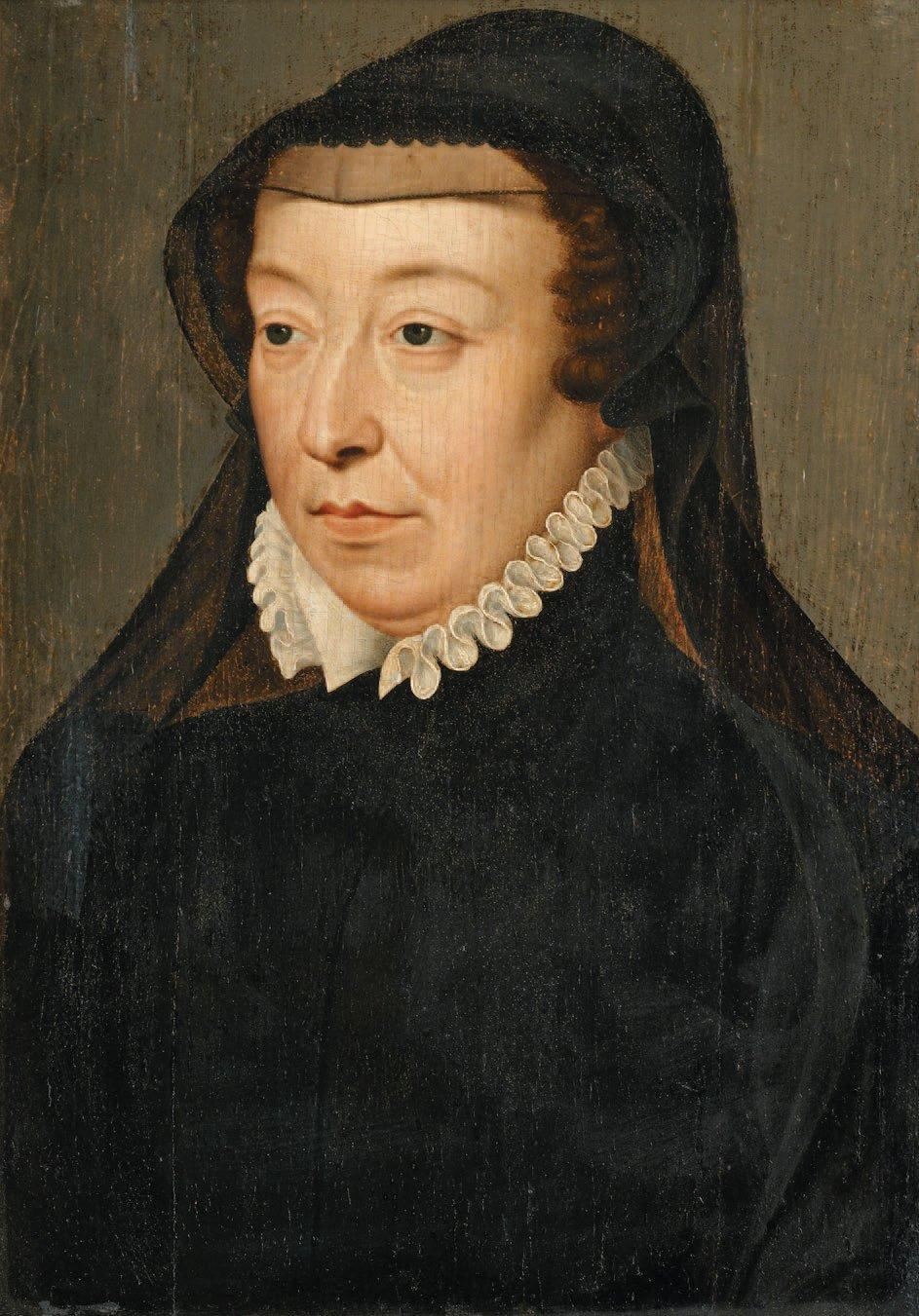
Catherine, de facto regent of the kingdom, wife of Henri II, mother of François II, Charles IX and the duc d'Orléans

The death of François II spelled the end of the Lorraine government, with Catherine's second son the duc d'Orléans ascendency the throne as Charles IX. Despite being a minor, in the estimation of the chancellor l'Hôpital, the young king already possessed the sole vision necessary to bring about order in the kingdom and banish fear. As Charles was only 10 years old, a regency was declared. Catherine assumed the role of regent. Lorraine was removed from his role as the leader of the king's financial affairs, to be replaced by chancellor l'Hôpital. As such on 12 December he announced his desire to retire to Reims. Guise at least temporarily remained the ascendant figure in military affairs. To assume the regency Catherine had to negotiate with the king of Navarre, who as premier prince du sang had a claim to the regency himself. On 2 December, before the death of the king, Navarre was brought before Catherine who reproached him with involvement in the various Bourbon plots. Catherine presented considerable evidence of his involvement in the conspiracies. Seeing his doom, Navarre protested his innocence and promised to relinquish any rights he had to the regency. Catherine had this drawn up in writing, promising that in return he would receive the role of lieutenant-general of the kingdom. Catherine agreed to support him in his efforts to receive compensation for Navarre, which had largely been annexed by the Spanish, and a future marriage between her daughter Marguerite and his son the young Henri. He therefore agreed to support Catherine's claim to the responsibilities of the regency. An embrace between him and his great enemies the Lorraine princes was then staged in which the two exchanged the kiss of peace. Over the following days Navarre would spend much time with Guise who explained to a confident that Navarre had asked for his forgiveness. On 17 December, Guise and Lorraine departed from court to make a Marian pilgrimage to Basilique Notre-Dame de Cléry accompanied by around 500 nobles in a show of strength. The pilgrimage was armed, like a crusade. According to Brantôme, Guise was being urged at this time by councillors and one of his brothers to undertake a coup.

With Guise absent, Catherine began to make moves of consolidation: companies of footmen believed to be devoted to Guise were dismissed, command of the army was restored to Montmorency, with d'Andelot allowed to resume his charge as colonel-general and the court chaplain Charles d'Humières was replaced with the humanist Jacques Aymot. Nevertheless, seeing the power of his departure, Catherine recalled him to court upon which Guise offered the young king his life for the defence of his crown and kingdom. The king responded that he considered Guise one of his most faithful servants. Catherine was appointed officially to the role by the royal council on 21 December. With a formal regency in effect, royal power was less absolute, and more open to the possibilities of challenge from great lords, not to mention the religious crisis that was consuming the kingdom. Catherine resolved that the path to political survival was to balance the competing factions that surrounded the court.

It was declared on 6 December that the conseil secret would be composed of the cardinals de Lorraine and Tournon, the duc de Guise and Montmorency, the king of Navarre, the chancellor de l'Hôpital and the marshals de Brissac and Saint-André. The conseil privé meanwhile would remain as it had during François' reign.

In the conseil privé on 8 December, Guise lost his patience with Coligny concerning Protestant assemblies. He announced that were it not for the dignity of their surrounds he would have stabbed Coligny.

Guise, excised from formal power, still carried a great deal of power through his clientele network. When he travelled he took with him 800 nobles. At this time one of them, the bastard of Bueil was assassinated by a relative of Montmorency's the comte de Laval.

The downfall of Guise and Lorraine was counterbalanced by the return of Montmorency to court, with the elderly grandee finding himself recalled shortly after the departure of the Lorraine princes from power. Montmorency approached court with a large armed force of his own, arriving on the evening of 7 December. Coligny was keen to exploit the new political balance by going after the Guise for their 'plots against him', and to this end presented 'incriminating evidence' against them. However Catherine urged him to be kind to them much to his annoyance. Coligny was emboldened by the assurance he had received from the English queen that he could 'boldly make record of her constancy'.

The bishop of Dax took credit for leading the negotiations between Catherine and Navarre that reached the arrangement that secured Catherine the regency. He was later accused of being a Protestant by the inquisition in 1563 because of his support of religious toleration and closeness with the Coligny brothers.

Louis de Gonzague, future duc de Nevers, at this time gave his estimation of the power balance in the court in which he resided. According to him Catherine enjoyed the greatest pre-eminence, while Navarre was second in authority limited by his poor mind, Tournon would have had the third greatest but for his age. Guise waited for summons while Lorraine claimed to wish to depart court. Marshal de Saint-André enjoyed great influence, while the other Marshal, Brissac was more secondary. Montmorency was also secondary in Gonzague's opinion.

The royal council beneath Catherine was broad and contained a range of religious opinions. In the analysis of the contemporary jurist François Baudouin there were three factions in the court. For the uncompromising Catholics the cardinals de Bourbon, Guise and Tournon, the ducs d'Aumale, d'Étampes and Guise; and marshals de Saint-André and Brissac. Cardinal Lorraine still hoped for some form of negotiated religious settlement. Durot is careful to differentiate Lorraine from others who hoped for a peaceful reconciliation of the French church, arguing his outlook was different to that of the bishop of Valence or Catherine. For him it was the confession of Augsburg that offered a way forward. Acceptance of the sacrament was the distinguisher for Lorraine between schismatics such as the Lutherans and heretics. The confession of Augsburg had the further advantages of emphasising French independence and forging ties with the princes of the Holy Roman Empire. The chancellor L'Hôpital, prince de La Roche-sur-Yon, king of Navarre, cardinal de Châtillon and bishops of Valence and Orléans likewise hoped for a peaceful reunification of the French church. Baudouin also places the councillors Paul de Foix, Claude d'Espence and Jean de Salignac in this party. Coligny represented the definitively Protestant wing of the council.

With Catherine in power, the secrétaires d'État now reported directly to the centre of royal authority, without any intermediary influence. Catherine looked to them for support. Going forward as a rule, dispatches from their various areas of responsibility would be presented to Catherine, who then opened them. This streamlined the process of administration from the confusing situation which had existed in prior times. It also allowed dispatches to be concealed from viewership by Navarre.

=== Kingdom of Navarre ===
During the period of Spanish mobilisation on the borders of France, the queen of Navarre had seen to the fortification of Béarn.

From her estates in Pau, the queen of Navarre formerly declared her abjuration from Catholicism and adoption of Protestantism on 25 December. Some historians attribute her conversion to de Bèze's efforts. Soon after taking this step she received delighted correspondence from the queen of England. Calvin for his part wrote his first letter to the queen in January 1561.

=== Estates General of Orléans ===
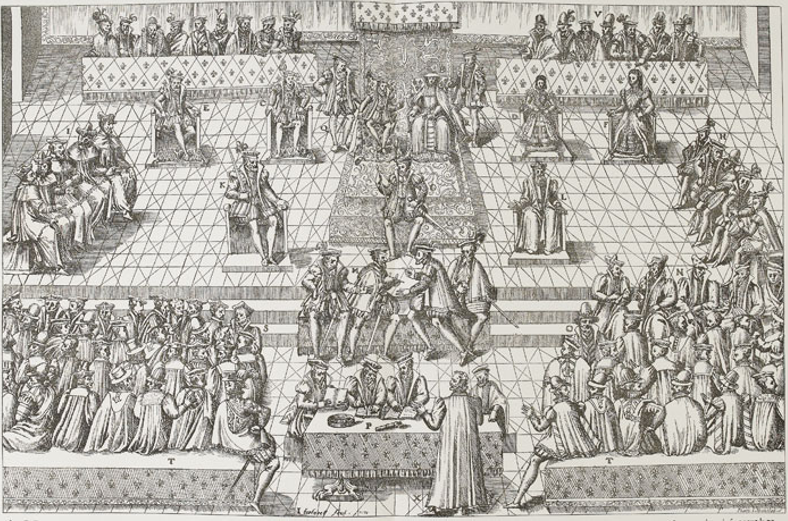
Estates General of Orléans in session

By the time of the Estates General of 1560, which was to be held at Orléans, the Protestant communities of places such as Poitiers were growing in confidence. As elections were being undertaken in October and November, they inserted a demand for full religious toleration into the cahiers (grievances drawn up by the local Estates) for the Third Estate delegates to take to the body at large. This was despite urgings by Lorraine and Guise for the religious question to be prohibited from the election process, for fear of exciting the passions that had caused the Amboise conspiracy. Protestants also asserted themselves in Blois, Angers, Angoulême, Rodez, Millau, Rouen, Cahors and Montauban, demanding the rights of public worship and temples. Even in areas where Protestants were a small minority, they were able to attract sympathy for their remonstrances due the widescale nature of abuses. While heresy was denounced by the cahiers of Épernay, the same cahiers explained the national presence of the 'new opinion' as a response to the abuses of the church who denounced any criticism of their practices as heresy. In Angers the lawyer François Grimaudet made vociferous attacks on the corruption of the church and judiciary. The assembly in the city was packed with armed men who wore kerchiefs to identify each other, they ensured a rapturous reception for toleration of Protestantism and the seizure of church wealth and stopped any motions against these propositions from being tabled. Scandalised Catholics departed from the assemblies. In Blois, the common people made an attempt to break down the door to the hôtel de ville where the urban notables were meeting for the election, thus they were allowed in to the process. Catholics were not entirely adverse to anti-clericalism. In Toulouse while the cahier called for the extirpation of heresy, it was also requested that the tithes be reduced and the greed and ignorance of the clergy was lambasted. Amiens urged the king to take the revenue of vacant benefices. Mariéjol highlights that the Estates General of 1560 was the first one in which we can be confident of the participation of the peasantry in the Third Estate election, and that this was reflected in the election of officers of the crown with whom they had to deal, representatives of justice and finance.

In total 455 deputies were present for the moment. The First Estate (clergy) would send 127 deputies, the Second Estate (nobility) would send 107 while the Third Estate (commons) would send 221 deputies. The disparity in numbers had no consequence on the Estates as the votes were undertaken by order, not by head.

On 13 December, shortly after the death of François, the Estates General was opened in Orléans. The delegates were initially unsure whether their mandate to meet remained valid given the death of the king. The notion of returning to the provinces for new elections was floated, however this was unacceptable to Catherine who feared it would return a slate of delegates eager to put the regency in Navarre's hands. She therefore had it declared in the conseil privé that their powers remained valid despite the death of the king.

In L'Hôpital's opening address he urged the deputies to put aside religious epithets such as 'papist' and 'Lutheran' and unite as Christians. They were to compete with one another only in matters of charity, prayers and persuasion. Those who in the name of religion conducted disorders or seditions would be subject to the king's justice and punishment. Seditious violence was for L'Hôpital like atheism, and it was key for magistrates to suppress such troubles. He highlighted the financial plight of the crown, announcing to the Estates, that all royal pensions were between two and five years in arrears. L'Hôpital saw the contraction of royal favour as a cause of the troubles with the aggrieved denied rewards they feel they rightly deserve resulting to seditions. Those favoured under Henri who no longer enjoyed the same royal benefits had to remember the crown was not given to the king by his subjects. Such a situation, L'Hôpital argued, was improper, the king was omnipotent and could dispense his favour as he pleased. The chancellor argued that the clergy must remember their sole power was over souls, and that they should not try to give law to princes.

Catherine directed the Estates towards a policy of religious moderation. Both the Second and Third Estates were open to the idea of religious toleration, and had many Protestants among their numbers. Some of the cahiers of the Second Estate were thinly disguised in their Protestantism, urging a return to the bible for resolving doctrinal disputes. Beyond this they support a thorough reform of the practices of the church. The Protestants among the Second Estate tried to direct the discussions towards the matter of Navarre's right to the regency, however the majority of the discussions were devoted to finance. The Second Estate found itself too divided even to establish a united cahier.

Having been meeting separately the three estates gathered for their first full body session on 1 January. By having the Estates meet separately until this point, the crown ensured they could not engage in united action, however it had the counter-effect of making it harder for the crown to set the agenda of their discussions. The speaker of the First Estate a canon-lawyer from Paris named Quintin declared that the king's sole duty was to strike down 'heretics', and that no relations should be conducted with Protestant polities like Geneva. He deplored the Second and Third Estate, both of whom advised the king finance himself at the expense of the clergy. This aroused the indignation of the speakers of the Second (the baron de Rochefort) and Third Estates (Jean Lange, a lawyer of Bordeaux) who denounced the ignorant greed of the First. Rochefort further argued that the nobility had a right, by their position as gentleman to freedom of worship. The histoire ecclésiastique noted with approval that Rochefort never addressed the king as his majesty ('a recent invention of flatterers'). Coligny complained to the queen about Quintin's address and he was forced to apologise, protesting that they were not his own thoughts, but those he had been asked to read. Factions of the Second Estate from Dauphiné and Burgundy (which were governed by Guise and Aumale respectively) pushed for the Lorraine princes to be made equal to the princes du sang in rank. However this was rejected by the Estates at large due to the broader Second Estate having distate for the proposal.

Catherine was frustrated at this arguing and tried to move the Estates to financial matters. Matters of finance had not been mentioned in the summons for the Estates. On 13 January L'Hôpital tried to direct the Estates towards a large financial package that would have relieved the crown of its debts. He informed the estates that the royal debt amounted to over 40,000,000 livres. For L'Hôpital it was clear that the debts were the fault of prior monarchs warlike nature. However the deputies were unmoved by this revelation, the First and Second Estate both refused to endorse donations, while the Third Estate decided, after ten days of debate that they did not have the mandate to support the requested subsidies from their elections. The Estates declared their interest in investigating the financial dealings of the favourites of the reign of Henri II (Saint-André, Guise, Montmorency, Diane) for financial impropriety. The First Estate proposed that royal pensions be further curtailed. They proposed improper gifts and pensions be returned to the crown. The Estates would meet until January, when the session was brought to an end. L'Hôpital proposed that the First Estate redeem loans and other expenditures worth around 15,000,000 livres, the Second Estate pay the gabelle and the Third Estate accept an increase in the taille and a wine tax. The deputies were returned to their provinces so that they might consider the chancellors financial requests of them. Knecht characterises the closure of the first meeting of the Estates as a 'prorogueing'.

The Estates therefore would resume at Pontoise in August. They were initially intended to reconvene at an earlier date in May but were pushed back by Catherine, who hoped more time would sooth the anger of the deputies. Catherine's assumption of the regency was not put before the Estates for their approval or disapproval during January, instead in council on 21 December the power sharing agreement between Catherine and Navarre was approved. Catherine would enjoy the powers of regent without technically holding the title, instead holding the title of 'governor of France'. She would chair royal council, and would direct both domestic and international policy. Letters patent were read to her before even they were read to her son. She had a royal seal fashioned for herself which acclaimed that she was 'Catherine, by the grace of God, queen of France, mother of the king'. In the image on the seal she occupied the place traditionally assumed by the king. She was to maintain the seal except for periods of illness or incapacity, in which circumstances Navarre was to enjoy the right. She also ensured that she was the only one other than the king who could sleep in his chambers and expressed her desire to never be separated from the king. The Estates were informed that there was no such thing as an interregnum, and that royal authority transferred instantaneously from one holder of the office to the next. The Estates protested their right to choose those who advise the king during his minority. They were eventually convinced to support Catherine's rights. Catherine wrote to her daughter, the queen of Spain on 19 December on the matter of Navarre, telling Élisabeth that Navarre was very obedient, and only acted with her approval.

With the Estates dispersed to get a new mandate from their baillages, a package of reforms was issued based on the discussions that had been undertaken during December. Firstly, the king issued lettres de cachet on 28 January in which the release of religious prisoners called for by the first edict of Amboise and edict of Loches was restated. It was emphasised that this amnesty also included those who had been under arms during the conspiracy of Amboise, but not the leaders. The broader Ordonnance d'Orléans, promulgated on 31 January promised the suppression of venal (purchased) office, as requested by the Second Estate, reform to the process by which bishops were elected and regulation that they are to reside in their benefices instead of occupying the charges as absentees. Of the 150 articles in the Ordonnance, 29 were concerned with rectifying the abuses of the church. In a rejection of the Concordat of 1516, elections were restored for bishops with three names to be suggested by the electors to the king who would choose the bishop (with Papal approval). Widescale reform of the judiciary and ecclesiastical professions was included in the Ordonnance. All new financial and judicial offices created since the time of Louis XII would be allowed to go extinct on the death of their present holders. This therefore implied that evil practice had entered the kingdom during the reign of François I. Registration of the Ordonnance was to be obstructed in the parlement and L'Hôpital had to force it through the body in April. L'Hôpital hoped the Ordonnance would be only the opening act of the reform of the French state. The Ordonnance would not be enforced. The crown lacked the financial position to buy back the venal office it had already issued. New venal offices would be created to meet financial need, bishops continued to fail to reside in their benefices. During 1561, the protests against royal pensions would also be answered, as they were all reduced by a third, while the income of the gentilhomme de la chambre du roi (gentleman of the king's chamber) were cut in half.

At this time Catherine wrote to Geneva, imploring the city to call back its preachers from France who 'disturbed the peace' of the kingdom.

The crown also negotiated with the Papacy for financial relief, the Pope agreed that if the French did not convene a national council of their church, and brought a fleet to bare against the Ottoman Empire, that he would permit a five-year alienation of 360,000 ducats (gold coins) per annum of church revenue.

The same day that the Estates General was brought to a close, Navarre, Coligny, cardinal de Châtillon, La Roche-sur-Yon and the bishop of Orléans put their backing behind a petition in council in favour of temples for Protestant worship. Catherine did not yield to the petition and worked to continue her more middle ground policy. To this end she promulgated letters patent on 22 February ordering a cease to any religious persecutions.

At the provincial estates of Languedoc, which convened ahead of Pontoise on 20 March in Montpellier, radically anti-clerical views were expounded. For example, a capitoul of Toulouse proposed that the churches temporal assets be liquidated to clear the royal debts, and that any remaining funds could be given to urban commissions to administer. To the distress of the clergy his proposal was adopted and he was selected as a deputy for the overall Estates at Pontoise. For Nîmes, a radical Protestant represented the city in Montpellier. He proposed the granting of churches to the Protestants and denounced the poor morals of the Catholic clergy. His proposals were greeted more coolly, and were not included in the cahiers as they were outside of the financial question they had been asked to consider. It was agreed that instead of being inserted into the cahiers the comte de Crussol would represent his grievances at the Estates General. Crussol, along with the rest of the nobility at the Languedoc Estates had approved of the idea of the Toulousian capitoul, and a modified version of it would be put forward at Pontoise by the Third and Second. Crussol reported to the crown from Montpellier that the estates had adopted the financial measures proposed by the king to resolve the crowns debts. According to Crussol the estates praised the regency government of Catherine and urged her to deploy the princes du sang in her administration.

In the provincial estates of Touraine, held in June, a Protestant former mayor of Tours dominated the proceedings with his demand that a place of worship be granted to the Protestants.

=== Navarre against Guise ===
In January Guise quarrelled with Navarre over the appointment of the guards, which Guise believed to be a responsibility of his as grand maître. He attacked Catherine's lenient policy towards Protestant preachers at the court and took to his bed for several days due to his 'grief' (according to the Ferrarese ambassador). On 31 January Guise announced the kingdom was heading towards ruin.

During February, Navarre took a new position in the legal dispute between the duc de Nemours and Françoise de Rohan (a cousin of the queen of Navarre). While he had previously supported the latter, he now threw in his lot with Nemours. At this time he also took meetings with the English ambassador.

Now in a fair degree of power, Navarre tried to move against his enemy the duc de Guise in February. He took umbrage with the continued possession of the keys to the courts residence by Guise in his capacity as grand maître. Catherine offered that she would secure the keys to the château for Navarre. Indeed, Guise offered her the keys and assured her his only desire was peace. Navarre however issued an ultimatum that if Guise was not expelled from the court, that he, Montmorency and the Coligny brothers would all depart. Such a large departure of grandees would have been a prelude to a state of civil war. This threat was undermined when Catherine was able to secure a promise from Montmorency (through the pleading of the young king to him) to remain at court with the king in such an eventuality, and with the power of his threat lost, Navarre backed down. He was afraid that making such a move without the support of Montmorency might entail his isolation. The disgrace of Guise was unpalatable to Catherine as it would represent a civil war. Catherine placated Navarre with the promise that his brother Condé (who since being freed from captivity was existing in a state of disgraced exile) could return to court. The royal council declared Condé innocent of the charges against him on 13 March. Condé was not in a conciliatory mood, and agitated for Guise to be held accountable. The prince, frustrated, departed court in the next few days, and was joined in his departure by d'Andelot. The sensitive matter of his legal innocence remained, Catherine did not wish the parlement to pronounce on the matter, preferring they dismiss the case, as a guilty verdict would disgrace the Bourbon family and an innocent verdict would inflame the conflict between Guise and Condé. Guise for his part proposed all the evidence be burned and the prosecution be dropped, despite the fact evidence had already been presented which proved Condé's involvement in the disorders of Lyon. Condé was insulted by Guise's proposal. When the parlement did pronounce on 13 June it was a cautious statement which didn't satisfy any party, nevertheless Condé was exonerated.

Navarre continued to agitate, and supported the moves by the Parisian electors for the upcoming second Estates General to have himself declared regent. The assembly further made demands that all members of the council during the reign of François II be excluded from authority and royal gifts during the reign of Henri II be returned. Catherine took Navarre to task on this, inquiring of him whether he was the instigator. Navarre replied that he was happy with what he saw, as the position of regent rightfully belonged to him. Catherine rejoindered that she recognised his services, but she would not allow herself to be robbed. With the assistance of the duchesse de Montpensier a compromise was reached. On 27 March Navarre was established in the position of lieutenant-general of the kingdom, and further as head of the royal army. He made an official signing away of his rights to the government of the kingdom, and this was countersigned by Condé for his own rights as a prince du sang. The position of lieutenant-general had only recently been the possession of the duc de Guise, thus depriving him of his military authority. To compensate Montmorency for placing Navarre in supreme control of the army, he was granted a gift of approximately 250,000 livres. Catherine assured the Spanish ambassador that Navarre's role as lieutenant-general was fundamentally subordinate to her own.

Navarre further involved himself in quarrel with the Marshal Saint-André, the result of which was Saint-André taking leave of court.

After the establishment of Navarre in the role of lieutenant-general of the kingdom, elements of the Lorraine family made a show of their displeasure at the new arrangement by departing court. Lorraine retired to his one of his châteaux on 1 February, writing to the French ambassador to Spain of his relief to be away from the intrigues of court for a little while. He would return to court shortly after Lent. Along with him went all his other brothers: the duc d'Aumale, the marquis d'Elbeuf, the cardinal de Guise and the Grand Prieur. Nobles with connection to the family, such as the duc de Nemours and Longueville also made their departure during January. From Reims, Lorraine was united with Marie Stuart and he intended to demonstrate that they could assume the role of a counter-power to the court.

Thus Lorraine retired to his archbishopric of Reims. Guise for his part was accompanied by 500 gentleman when he travelled, due to fear that he might be subject to an attack by those loyal to Navarre. Along with many of the Lorraine princes, departed also from court many of the compagnies d'ordonnance that had been summoned to Orléans for the arrest of Condé, a fact which dismayed the crown and court.

=== Edict of 19 April to the Edict of July ===
The crown adopted a religious policy increasingly favourable to the Protestants during the early reign of Charles IX. It was ordered of the parlements that religious prisoners be released by lettres de cachet issued on 28 January and 22 February. This remained on the condition that those who were released would promise to live henceforth as good Catholics without recourse to scandal. Unlike the previous edicts, this included those who had assumed arms, and preachers. Only the chief leaders of the conspiracy of Amboise were excluded from the lettres de cachet drawn up by Catherine. During April, two parlementaires (De Thou and Gilles Bourdin) were deputed by parlement to entreat the king to restore order in the kingdom. On 19 April an edict was established that outlawed the use of religious epithets such as 'papist' and 'huguenot' in fear that such insults were an instigation to violence. Despite this house searches were still permitted and secret Protestant assemblies remained forbidden. Those whose property had been seized and had fled into exile, would be permitted to reclaim their property if they returned as good Catholics. This overturned a clause of the Edict of Châteaubriant. The edict was sent to the governors of the provinces before it was sent to the parlement for registration, due to concerns that the court would be hesitant to register the edict. The parlement of Paris reacted vociferously to this edict, remonstrating the king on 11 May that never before had a French king approved of religious schism in his realm. Moreover, when such 'heresies' had arisen, as with the Albigensians the French kings had seen to its total extermination. It was not the fault of those who gathered outside the houses of illicit preachings, but rather the fault of the illicit preaching itself that disorders resulted, or so the parlement reckoned. The parlement further objected to the subversion of their prerogatives to send out this law before it had received registration from the parlement, an act which 'made the law void'.

On 11 June the Protestant seigneur d'Esternay presented a petition to the crown with many Protestant grievances, among them a request for the right to have temples, bring back those who were exiled for their Protestantism and the allowance for public services. The subsequent Edict of July, issued on 30 July, was a fairly mixed edict for the Protestants, despite the overall push towards persecution from the deputies assembled to debate its terms from 23 June to 11 July. Jouanna sees Lorraine as the instigator of the 'pourparlers' at which the terms of the edict were discussed. During the assembly, Coligny and the duc de Guise again clashed as they had in the Assembly of Notables. According to Romier the edict was a "marvel of calculated incoherence and, it must be said, deception". In the edict L'Hôpital urged that magistrates contain their desire towards zeal. House searches to look for private worship was prohibited. A new amnesty was declared for religious offences of the past years, on the understanding the offender would now live a law abiding Catholic life. Protestant worship itself remained outlawed. The carrying of firearms was now judged worthy of a death sentence. The harshest punishment that a heretic could face now though was established to be banishment, referrals of sentencing to the parlement could no longer impose the death penalty. False accusations of heresy were to receive the same punishment. The sessions which drew up the edict contained opportunities for voting, the decision to ban all assemblies was achieved with a majority of only three, a matter which according to Étienne Pasquier caused protests from those who opposed the resolution that it was not right to throw France into disorders for three votes. This edict was registered provisionally by the parlement, however the body continued to stall in the registration of the Ordonnance d'Orléans. Despite the prohibitions on Protestantism the edict contained, it was not the herald of a new era of repression. The edict pleased neither the Protestants or the militant Catholics.

Guise was however more pleased in the edict than he had been in the Edict of 19 April, seeing the explicit ban on assemblies either under arms or without arms as a victory. He did however interpret the edict in a way different to Catherine. The king therefore asked the parlement of Grenoble to ratify the edict so that the troubles of the province might be appeased - the spirit of the law; Guise meanwhile wrote to his lieutenant-general in Dauphiné La Motte-Gondrin urging him to follow the edict by ensuring all assemblies other than Catholic ones were prohibited.

Chancellor L'Hôpital remonstrated in front of the parlement of Paris on 18 June. He argued that to follow the path of François I and Henri II as regards religious policy was to fall into error. For they sought to ameliorate religious divisions by human means, failing to appreciate the division was a divinely sent punishment for men's sins.

==== Enforcement ====
Concerned with the situation in Languedoc, Catherine entrusted two local grandees to see to the enforcement of the Edict of July. The bishop Lorenzo Strozzi was sent to Albi, while the baron de Terride was entrusted with seeing that the situation remained calm in Toulouse and the edict was enforced. He found being afforded access to Toulouse challenging despite his commission. The missions were a failure.

=== Triumvirate ===
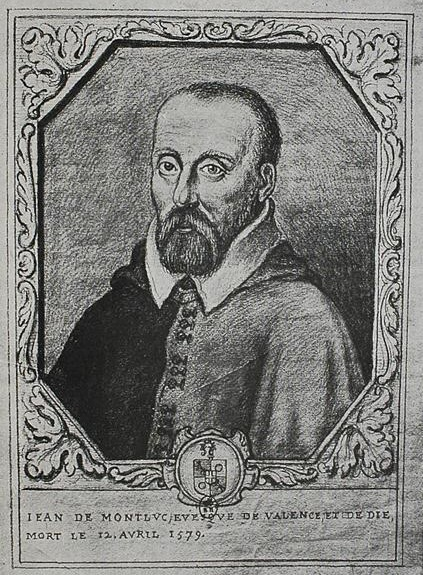
Bishop of Valence whose Lenten sermon so incensed Montmorency

Matters reached a head between the increasingly liberal atmosphere of royal policy and the intransigent Catholics of the French court on Palm Sunday 1561. On this day, the Protestant Admiral Coligny held a public service in his quarters of the royal château de Fontainebleau. The doors were thrown open and a thousand were present for the display. Coligny's brother the cardinal de Châtillon caused further scandal by celebrating the eucharist 'in the mode of Geneva'. With the liberal bishop of Valence due to give the Lenten sermon at court, the Constable retired in disgust after hearing some of his remarks into the servants quarters where he was joined by Saint-André and Guise to hear the sermon of a Jacobin friar. On his way down to the servants quarters, Guise met with Catherine in the gardens and informed her that she could no longer 'drink from two fountains'. Guise, Montmorency and Saint-André received communion together. Guise was increasingly of the opinion that Catherine and Navarre lacked legitimacy before god to govern. To Guise, the attacks on Catholicism the new policy represented were an attack on his very identity.

In reaction to the new direction of the crown's religious policy, Montmorency, Saint-André and Guise entered into an informal agreement that has become known to history as the 'Triumvirate'. Carroll notes that the term implies a conspiracy against the state, but argues that there is no evidence such a plan existed. Guise had approach Montmorency to formulate this reconciliation through the conduit of Saint-André. This was established under the auspices of Cardinal de Tournon. The three 'Triumvirs' shared Montmorency's table on 6 April. They agreed to work together to protect the ascendency of Catholicism. According to the Spanish ambassador they announced that they would remain loyal to the king as long as he abided by the tenets of Catholicism, a conditional obedience. They also agreed to work together to confound the Estates plan to investigate them financially. This was important to Saint-André as he had enriched himself during the reign of Henri II. As part of their political plans, they sought to detach Navarre from Catherine's government. This Triumvirate politically separated Montmorency from his three Protestant nephews. The Constable informed Coligny that while he desired unity, there could be no repeat of his Palm Sunday service. Montmorency was drawn to the new alignment by the disinterest the regency government took in his advice, his conservative Catholicism and the revolutionary attitude he sensed in the recent demands of the Estates General for an investigation into the doings of the grandees. His eldest son marshal de Montmorency protested against his father's new alliance arguing it was based on unfounded prejudice. Montmorency's religious convictions were however too strong to be overcome by such protests and he responded to his son that a change in his religion would only come about if the state changed - he thus intended to be a good servant of Charles.

A forged document produced by Protestants in 1562 claimed that the alliance also agreed to work together with Spain and Savoy towards the extirpation of heresy not only in France but the rest of Europe too and destroy the bloodline and name of the house of Bourbon. Though this document was a forgery, they did seek relations with Spain and the Papacy, with Montmorency dispatching an agent to the latter to assure the Pope of his Catholic piety. Pius wrote back warmly to Montmorency. Durot describes the alliance as lacking a 'manifesto or program' prior to 1562. Carroll characterises the 'Triuvmirate' at this time as a 'loose agreement to drop old antagonisms during the current crisis'.

According to Chantonnay, the Spanish ambassador, alongside Saint-André, Montmorency and Guise this alliance featured the participation of the marshal de Brissac, duc de Montpensier, and cardinal de Bourbon. Montpensier was a rival of Guise whose wife was close to Catherine, however his religious convictions caused him to align with the Catholic reaction. Alongside the religious motivations of the alliance there was also the matter of access to royal favour. Montmorency and Guise had been shifted out of their pre-eminent positions of authority over the military by the establishment of Navarre as the lieutenant-general of the kingdom. This was a key factor in Montmorency turning his back on his Protestant nephews who remained in royal favour at court. Chantonnay urged the new faction to work towards the defection of Navarre to their party.

Their alliance represented just one manifestation of the backlash to toleration. On 14 April there were clashes in Paris between a Protestant congregation and a Catholic crowd in several places in the city. On 24 April students of the Université de Paris descended upon Protestants who were singing psalms on the Pré-aux-Clercs. The Protestants were besieged in the residence of the seigneur de Longjumeau by the angry students. Among those who regularly attended services in Longjumeau's residence were the duc de Longueville and Filippo Strozzi, a cousin of the queens. The several hundred Protestants gathered in the residence armed themselves with pistols. Catherine had Navarre raise the matter with the rector of the university to express the crowns disapproval at the actions of the students. The parlement of Paris by contrast ordered Longjumeau exiled from Paris on 28 April. Guise rode as an escort to protect the priests of the Corpus Christi procession. Furious Parisians almost burned down the hôtel of Condé's wife Éléonore de Roye due to the public preaching she undertook in the residence. Around the same time the palace of cardinal de Châtillon (in Beauvais where he was bishop) was invaded by an angry crowd of rioters after he celebrated the last supper in the Genevan fashion. Coligny also had his son baptised according to Calvinist rites. A priest suspected of Protestant sympathies was also killed by a crowd in Beauvais, with his body being burned in the market square. Philip II was also concerned by developments in France and he instructed his ambassadors to warn Catherine against any policy of toleration. Philip was concerned the growth of Protestantism in France posed a threat to his dominion of the Netherlands. His representative in the Netheerlands, the cardinal de Granvelle wrote to him that he was astonished things weren't more disordered in the Netherlands given the example of their neighbour.

During March, Monluc, in alliance with other Catholic lords of the south-west such as the baron de Fumel produced a manifesto to be submitted to the king, offering their services to rid him and the kingdom of the Protestants. This set them up in opposition to the more moderate lieutenant-general of Guyenne, the seigneur de Burie.

Lorraine celebrated Easter at his archbishopric of Reims with all his brothers aside from Guise, and Marie Stuart.

On Easter Monday Guise retired from court to his château de Nanteuil, while Montmorency departed from court to be present for the marriage of his son the seigneur de Thoré to Léonore d'Humières. Catherine was at first furious with Guise, seeing him as responsible for the failure to achieve unity at the court and weakening her son the king.

As 1561 proceeded Navarre oscillated back and forth between public displays of Protestantism and affirmations of his Catholicity. While this has traditionally been seen as an indecisive flaw in his character, Jouanna argues that it was a far more strategic process by which he sought to fish for concessions from Spain for his loyalty.

At this time, Guise and Lorraine attempted to secure a new marriage for their now widowed niece, hoping to see Marie Stuart married to the heir to the Spanish throne Don Carlos. Lorraine also entered contact with the Emperor who proposed a marriage between Marie and his son the Archduke. Catherine strongly opposed these manoeuvres, seeing in it an attempt by the Lorraine princes to secure an alliance that could be used against her. On the matter, she described them as 'those who had become accustomed to being kings'. Catherine made an alternate proposal, offering her daughter Marguerite as a match for the Spanish prince. The project would not come to pass. Philip for his part, was beginning to re-evaluate his interests in France, he was now seeing Guise as the greater defender of his interests, where in the past he had seen Montmorency.

The court set out for the coronation of the king on 1 May, stopping at Nanteuil so that they could enjoy Guise's hospitality. On 15 May 1561 the young Charles was crowned at Reims. The ceremony was long, with three oaths sworn by the new king. He was anointed seven times before being dressed in a purple mantle decorated with fleurs de lys. The premier prince du sang Navarre then placed the crown on the young king's head with the assistance of his son. Exhausted by the ceremony and the weight of the clothes the young king spent most of the ceremony crying, which was viewed as a poor omen by those present. During the ceremony there was a dispute over precedence between constable de Montmorency, who expected to enjoy the position of first among the peers of the realm for the ceremony, and Catherine, who wished her son Anjou to have seniority over all other peers. It would only be in 1576 that princes du sang were raised above other peers in seniority. Cardinal de Châtillon was the only representative of the Protestant high nobility present for the coronation. He had brought with him his wife Elizabeth de Hauteville which was a cause of considerable scandal for a cardinal. Condé, Coligny, Longueville, Marshal Montmorency and Damville all absented themselves due to a lack of desire to participate in the mass. According to the earl of Hertford those who did attend demonstrated a low level of interest. In retaliation for his failure to attend the coronation mass, Guise broke off his daughters marital engagement to Longueville. Guise opined that he would rather marry his daughter to a 'poor gentleman' than Longueville. Lorraine warned the young king during the ceremony that anyone who sought to change his religion would also be taking the crown from his head.

From the coronation, the court travelled to the estates of Lorraine at Marchais-Liesse, then from there on to those of the Constable in Picardy. Catherine raised Château-Porcien to the status of a principality in June in favour of the Protestant prince de Porcien.

=== Estates of Pontoise ===
The Estates reconvened in Pontoise for the second part of their meeting. The Estates were opened on 27 August with the Second and Third Estate due to hold their discussions at Pontoise while the First Estate would work from Poissy. The speaker of the Third Estate, the mayor of Autun plead the poverty of the commons, who could only offer the king their loyalty. The speaker of the Third Estate further opined that freedom of conscience was a natural right of the king's subjects. Moreover, he alleged that religious diversity in the kingdom was the product of the passion the king's subjects had for the safety of their souls. Both the Second and Third Estate (nobility and commons) launched a concerted attack on the First Estate. They jointly proposed that the crown resolve its financial quagmire by selling off all church property. They estimated that the crown could generate 120,000,000 livres by such sales. Of this 120,000,000, 42,000,000 would be put towards the crown's debts while 48,000,000 would be invested in such a way as to generate 4,000,000 a year in incomes for the clergy. The final 30,000,000 would be loaned to private individuals who would work for the economic betterment of the realm. Montmorency was horrified by the statements of the Third Estate, and proposed that the speaker be hanged. The Third Estates' proposal greatly alarmed the First Estate (clergy), who hurriedly entered into an agreement with the crown by which they would provide an annual subsidy of 1,600,000 livres for six years. By this means the crown would be able to redeem alienate domains and revenues. This agreement was known as the 'contract of Poissy'. Though not quite what they had originally proposed, the concessions of the clergy provided the crown some financial relief.

In return for providing this relief to the crown, the bishops secured the right to meet and manage the specifics of the subsidies they had offered. Despite these concessions, the crown would still sell off clerical land for funds, engaging in this practice for the first time in 1563. Once the Estates had dispersed, the crown unilaterally imposed a new tax on wine without their approval.

=== Explosion of Protestantism ===
In Autumn 1561, the fortunes of Protestantism were on the rise. Among the nobility they could represent sizeable proportions of the population: 19% of the nobles of Beauce, around 33% of those in Quercy. The nobles who converted tended to be young and sensitive to the honour of their house. For the converters there was a mixture of religious conviction, social and political drives towards Protestantism. Among the broader population Babelon estimates Protestants made up around 2,000,000 of France's population of 17/18,000,000 at this time. In a petition submitted to the crown in early 1562, the Protestant petitioner would estimate that they held 2,150 churches in the kingdom the resources of which they assured they would devote to the interests of the crown. So many Protestant pastors were dispatched from Geneva to France that the pulpits of Geneva were left empty (Lausanne was left with no preachers for a time). Of forty four pastors who can be concretely identified fourteen at least were nobles. This included visits from the leading pastors de Bèze, Jean-Raymond Merlin and Guillaume Farel. Farel set himself up at Gap and became the centre of activism across Dauphiné. Pierre Viret preached in Nîmes (where an academy would be set up for the training of further preachers), Montpellier and Lyon, the latter of which he would remain in during 1562. Merlin established himself in Coligny's household for several months before he was called back to Geneva. It was even said that the Protestant Admiral Coligny would be the new governor of the young king. Catherine allowed her children to recite their prayers in French and permitted them to sing the psalms. The cardinal d'Armagnac and di Ferrara were both invited to the residence of the queen of Navarre where they were witness to a sermon by a Protestant preacher and the singing of psalms. In this atmosphere of greater religious freedom, many Protestants began to practice their religion, though it remained officially illegal.

The greatest manifestation of the courtly Protestantism at this period was the celebration of the marriage between Jean de Rohan (a cousin of the queen of Navarre) and Diane de Barbançon on 29 September at Argenteuil. De Bèze performed the rites for the new couple. Coligny and the queen of Navarre selected the date of 29 September for the festivities, by this means allowing the Protestant nobles an excuse to avoid attending the yearly Mass for the Ordre de Saint-Michel that was to be held on that day. Catholics protested against the holding of the ceremony but no royal action followed.

Fifteen new chevaliers de l'ordre de Saint-Michel were created by Catherine in late 1561. They were all clients of the Bourbon and Châtillon, well inclined towards the course of toleration if not themselves Protestants. As a result, a majority of the chevaliers were in support of the new royal policy.

Some Protestants went further and attacked what they saw as symbols of 'Popery', engaging in acts of iconoclasm. Through iconoclasm, attacks on churches and priests, Protestants hoped to destroy the Catholic church itself through the scattering of the organisations assets. The relics of saints were cast from their shrines and burned in fires. They also hoped that it would be an educational tool, showing the 'credulous' Catholics still subject to the 'superstitions' of the church that the items of Catholic dogma were not in fact untouchable. Through the violent declaration of their faith embodied by iconoclasm, the possibilities of martyrdom were also afforded. Many Catholics would instead react with horror. As early as 24 February 1561 the Protestants had assumed control of the church of Issigeac near Bergerac and began to 'purify' it of 'idolatrous images and items'. As 1561 went on this campaign broadened, Vienne in March; Sauve in July; Montauban and its surrounds in August; Montpellier, Nîmes and their subsidiary villages in September and October, Orange in November and December; Agen in December. From the middle of 1561 onwards the iconoclasm was accompanied by occupations armed or otherwise. The iconoclasm was most profoundly felt in le Midi (southern France). A Spanish bishop travelling through the country on the way to the council of Trent reported that the only diocese he passed through which was untroubled by religious disorders was Narbonne. Wood's analysis of violent Protestant acts in the 1560s sees the epicentre of attacks as being in Guyenne and Languedoc. The notables in the Protestant movement sought to blame such violent action on the 'lower class' elements of the Protestant movement, the artisans and peasants. One synod would chide their Protestant community that it was the duty of the magistrates to remove superstitious idolatry, not private individuals.

Across France in this period, the nascent Protestant church was arming and organising itself. Each church had the responsibility to support a horsed soldier (either by equipping them or funding their expenses), each synod was subordinate to a military leader, every church was to have a captain. For example, Guyenne was divided into seven colloquies each led by a captain, beneath them were colonels and then captains of individual Protestant communities. The individual churches were not supposed to be autonomous military entities, and were meant to take direction from their colloquy. Their military ranks were swelled by those who had been demobilised in the austerity of François II's reign. With this paramilitary backing, church seizures were undertaken, to bring new temples into the fold of Genevan worship.

Catholic fears particularly focused on the seditious threat that this Protestant growth threatened. However, Protestants in general preferred to acquire control of their local cities through infiltration and co-option of the mechanisms of urban government. With local offices under their control they could intervene in favour of their coreligionists. This strategy achieved inroads in Rouen, Tours, Amiens and Caen in the north. In the south the successes were far more widespread, with Protestant administrative successes occurring in Nîmes, Montpellier, Montauban, Toulouse, Castres, Valence, Béziers, Pézenas, Montagnac, Rabastens, Revel, Lavaur and Gaillac.

Protestant direct action in many circumstances revolved around the freeing of their brethren from both jail and the executioners block. Such jailbreaks occurred in Rouen, Nantes, La Réole, Sainte-Foy-la-Grande and Laplume.

Calvin's attitude towards Protestant compromise hardened in this period. He entered dispute with the Protestant Baudouin, derisively describing him as a 'moyenneur' for his willingness to seek concord in a way Calvin viewed as compromising the faith. Calvin therefore advised his right-hand man de Bèze to limit himself to a defence of only the first two centuries of church history at the upcoming conference of Poissy, where in prior years he had been willing to accept the first 400–500 years of the 'primitive church' as legitimate.

==== Bishops ====
The bishop of Troyes, a protégé of Catherine, made the decision to convert to Protestantism. He had concern that his conversion would necessitate the renouncing of his benefice and material possessions. He wrote to Calvin who assured him he could maintain the temporal wealth of the church if he used it for the relief of the poor. Thus he renounced some of his benefices while maintaining others. The bishop would style himself Antoine, bishop and minister of the Holy Gospel.

The bishops of Chartres and Senlis became notorious with the Catholic ultras for their unorthodox views. Both were cited for investigation by the inquisition in 1561. The formers toleration of Protestants would be such that a decade later he would be a target during the St Bartholomew's Day massacre.

Several bishops (the bishops of Cahors, Chalon-sur-Saône and Coutances) were captured by local Protestants in 1561 and held for ransom. The bishop of Cahors was released after a ransom of 1,000 écus was paid in 1562, while that of Coutances escaped disguised as a miller and the bishop of Chalon-sur-Saône was only released after the conclusion of the first war of religion in March 1563.

In response to the Protestant seizure of churches, the archbishop of Albi took charge of 300 men during 1561 who successfully recaptured the church of Saint-Pierre in Albi from the Protestants. The archbishop, a cousin of the queen mother, had been tasked by Catherine with pacifying the region by any means necessary. That same year the cardinal d'Armagnac who was also the bishop of Rodez summoned the local clergy to arm themselves so that they might seize back the churches of Villefranche. Armagnac distributed arms among the several hundred clergy who answered the call. They would not for the moment succeed in re-securing Villefranche for Catholicism. Many Catholic preachers denounced Catherine and her policy of toleration.

==== Île de France ====
In the capital, the governor (the prince de La Roche-sur-Yon) militarily enforced a de facto toleration of Protestantism during this period.

Catherine asked the duc de Guise to participate in the capital's Corpus Christi procession out of fear that the Protestants were planning to disrupt the celebration. Indeed, Guise received several couriers requesting his presence. According to Brantôme, Guise answered the call 'for the honour of god'. He escorted the procession on horseback. By now he was beginning to build a reputation among the common people of the city as a defender of Catholicism and at the procession he was a centre of attention. Indeed, Brantôme argues the Parisians were of the opinion that if not for his presence there would have been scandal and disruption to the procession. Lorraine who was also recalled to the capital played the central role in the feast of the Octaves of Corpus Christi, leading the 'body of the lord' in a procession then conducting the mass at Saint-Germain-des-Prés.

By late 1561 Montmorency and the bishop of Paris were looking towards the 'reconquest' of the city for the Catholic faith. To this end lists were drawn up of declared Protestants in the capital, with the pair determining there were around 4–5,000 Protestants in the city. Saint-André undertook a similar census of Protestants in Lyon.

Disorder increasingly consumed the city, with the students of the Sorbonne travelling to Mass under arms, and various armed bands wandering the streets. In hopes of soothing the situation, La Roche-sur-Yon was replaced with Marshal Montmorency as governor of the city.

During October, Catherine informed the Protestants of Paris to only meet in secret and in numbers less than 200. By this means the governor would be able to protect them. De Bèze despaired at how in defiance of this order, thousands would gather. On 12 October, after around 7,000-8,000 Protestants had departed from the city gates to worship outside the walls, a group of Catholics closed the gates on them. The Protestants tried to fight their way back into the city and several were seriously injured in the scuffle that followed. A week later, the crown ordered that the population of Paris be disarmed.

Four theologians in Paris who had decided to debate whether the Pope could depose a heretical or tyrannical king were arrested. Another preacher named Artus Desiré called for aid from Philip II to combat Protestantism in France.

On 10 December, a radical Catholic preacher named Jean de Hans who regularly made inflammatory sermons (such as one predicting the ruin of the kingdom if the crown's policy towards Protestantism did not change), was arrested on the orders of the king, so that he might explain himself at the château de Saint-Germain. Paris exploded in outrage at the arrest, and the crown yielded to a delegation of Parisian merchants who came to court to protest the arrest, releasing the preacher, who departed in triumph. Radical monks preached at Saint-Merry, Saint-Eustache and Saint-Jacques de la Boucherie in defiance of investigations from the parlement of Paris.

==== Burgundy ====
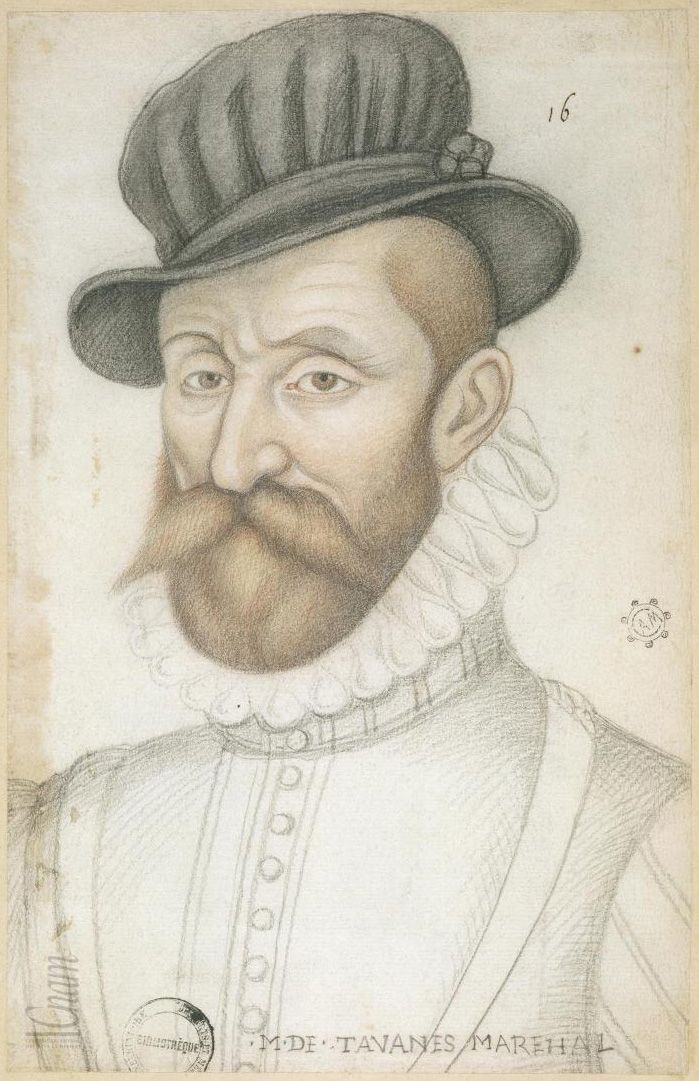
Lieutenant-general of Burgundy, the seigneur de Tavannes

In June the election for mayor of Dijon was contested between a militant Catholic and a Protestant candidate. Despite the efforts of the Protestant community of Dijon they were unable to get their candidate elected.

A serious disturbance was narrowly avoided in Dijon on the evening before All Saints Day as Catholics threw stones at Protestants as they went to their illegal service which was being held across from the hôtel de ville (city hall). Both Catholic and Protestant were dispersed by the mayor and syndic with soldiers. The cities ban on illicit assemblies was then re-affirmed. On All Saints Day proper the Protestants undertook a large demonstration through the city centre. Alarmed, the Catholic vignerons (wine growers) rang the tocsin and assembled to confront what they assumed to be a coup attempt, in the scuffle that followed a Catholic dyer was killed. In the wake of this the city plead for the crown to take action against Protestantism, and for the lieutenant-general Tavannes to come to Dijon personally so the community could be secure while Protestantism was purged. Tavannes agreed to work together with the mayor towards the extirpation of Protestantism. He issued prohibitions against the singing of psalms in French, an act many Catholics found insulting. Many were arrested as a result of these prohibitions. The parlement of Dijon moved to arrest all the involved Protestants.

The elder of the Maligny brothers, who had been involved in the conspiracy of Amboise in the previous year, fortified himself in Burgundy in a heavily protected château around 20 km away from Auxerre. Despite the orders of Catherine that he be arrested, the lieutenant-general of Burgundy Tavannes felt the matter was not possible due to the many friends Maligny possessed in the area.

==== Champagne ====
During 1561, the countryside of Champagne was plagued by a company of marauders under the command of a 'colonel Beaulieu'. The seigneurs de La Motte-Tilly and d'Esternay led a combined force of nobles and common people to crush Beaulieu's force. They succeeded in hunting down Beaulieu's force, with many captives being brought to Provins. Beaulieu and the band were able to buy their freedom however.

Disorder was not a universal state of affairs in the kingdom. When the lieutenant-general of Champagne, the seigneur de Barbezieulx wrote to the town of Châlons in November, to acquire of the state of policing in the city during this tumultuous period, he was informed that there was no disorder in Châlons, nor any sign there would be any in the future.

==== Picardy ====
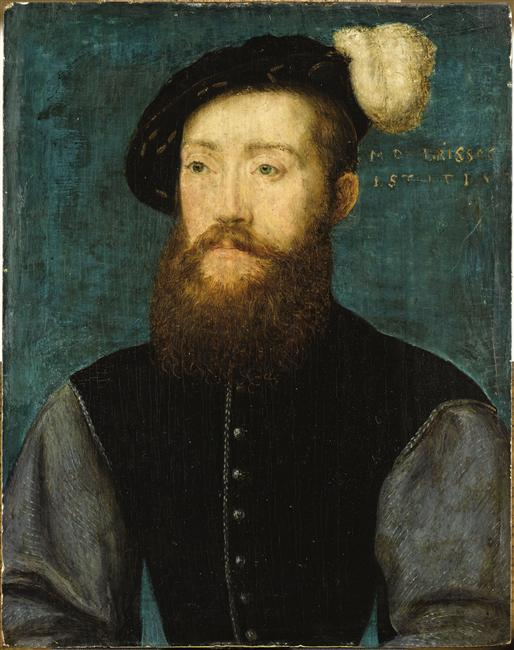
Marshal de Brissac, governor of Picardy and military leader during the latter Italian Wars

On 3 October Condé received the post of governor of Picardy, replacing Brissac in the responsibility. It was impossible for the crown to overlook Condé's landed wealth in Picardy, not to mention the Protestant inclinations of much of the senior nobility of the region. A large number of his 200 estates were in Picardy, and his wife's lands were centred there. He quickly began exercising his new charge. The lieutenant-general of the province under Condé would be the Protestant sieur de Sénarpont, meanwhile the governor of Boulogne and the Boulonnais was the Protestant seigneur de Morvilliers. The governor of Abbeville, the seigneur d'Hercourt, was a Protestant client of Coligny's. While the governor of Calais, the sieur de Gourdan, was not a Protestant, the twelve mercenary companies who filled the city were under the command of the Protestant d'Andelot. Other important Picard nobles, the sieur de Genlis and the sieur d'Ivoy were also Protestant and flocked to affiliate themselves with Condé. To compensate Brissac for his dispossession, his son was to be offered the post of colonel of the infantry in French Piemonte.

Protestant confidence grew in Amiens as their presence as city échevins expanded. The Protestant échevins worked to ensure their co-religionists who did not engage in disorders were protected from Catholic attack. On 6 December a Protestant service at the residence of the baron de Dompmartin was subject to an attack by Catholics who burst in, chased the Protestants, burned the ministers chair and looted the residence. Several échevins tried to intervene in the situation but were unsuccessful. The following day came the Protestant revenge as the cathedral was invaded during Vespers with the interior trashed. During the confrontation, some were wounded. In the estimation of the Protestant échevins the bishop was to blame for the disorders, and he was informed that he needed to restrain the radical sermons of the clergy. Arrests were also undertaken of some 200 people, with the judge who was to try them being replaced due to his perceived sympathies to the radical Catholic faction and hatred of Protestants.

==== Normandy ====
In Normandy, the governor the duc de Bouillon visited his governate for the second ever time in 1561. Though a Protestant, he had poor ties with the local Protestant nobility of Normandy. Instead of rallying around him, they looked to other nobles such as the comte de Montgommery, the d'Agneaux and Sainte-Marie families. Bouillon was left largely impotent in terms of his own power. The Catholics of the province looked to the lieutenant-generals the sieur de Villebon and the seigneur de Matignon. Despite his weak ties with the Protestant nobility of Normandy, Bouillon instructed his deputies to see that Protestantism was tolerated in his governate.

In Rouen the Protestants attacked the portal of the cathedral, during the conduct of a Lenten sermon. The crowd then invaded the cathedral and denounced the friar as fat. Parlementaires associated with Guise were subject to threats and attacks. The governor of Normandy, the duc de Bouillon visited the city in July and expressed his desire to see order maintained. However he also gave his implicit approval for non-disruptive Protestant worship. In late 1561, the cardinal de Bourbon visited Rouen, a rare visit for a city which was technically his diocese. The Protestants of the city greeted him with scorn, showering him with insults, and dressing up his pulpit with a broadsheet of a flock of geese (a way of calling him a king of liars). When a Rouennais citizen was found in possession of a list of 400 of the cities leading Protestants in September, he was executed on suspicion of being involved in anti-Protestant plot by a commission led by the duc de Bouillon. It was reported the executed man had correspondence from Lorraine and Catherine. By November the Protestants felt confident enough to worship openly in the Halles.

As early as 1560 Protestantism's growth in Caen had already been strong with nine of the eleven councillors on the présidial court being Protestant. Dauvin characterises the city as one in which conversion could be conducted with impunity. The présidial body was venal which facilitated its easy co-option. A Protestant also controlled the chief financial office of the city responsible for tax collection (the receveur). Of those revenues which were farmed out, a majority were administered by Protestants. Protestantism took on an elite character in the city which aided its success in the triennial municipal elections. By this time around a third of the population was Protestant. Dauvin is unable to find a crisis in the cities Catholicism that explains the rapid growth of Protestantism, and looks instead to the cities commercial contacts, fiscal discontent and the presence of the university. In the absence of the governor of the city, Montmorency, Caen was governed by the Catholic captain of the château the sieur d'Hugueville, however he had few military resources at his disposal. As a result of the lack of resources the city was vulnerable to Protestant insurrection. Protestant strength was also to be found in the bourgeois militia where Protestant men comprised a majority.

Of the four Protestant échevins elected for Caen in 1561, one Michel de Le Bigne, was likely a cousin of La Renaudie's secretary during the conspiracy of Amboise. The registers of the baillage record disorders on religious grounds going back to 1560 when reports of iconoclasm appear. Alongside iconoclasm, the problem of printing of illicit books began to be felt in Caen. Protestant judges oversaw the arrest of their co-religionists on this matter as when several were arrested in May 1561 on suspicion of having published in favour of the abolition of the mass.

In August of that year, in the north of the kingdom at the trade fair of Guibray in Normandy, Protestants were present in force. A preacher was able to bring forth a crowd of 5-6000 Protestant's. When confronted with Catholic rosary bead manufacturers they began a riot and drove the Catholics from the fair. Protestants ran through the fair with swords, intimidating any who sang against their cause. There was a class divide in the religious violence, many humbler converts not desirous of waiting for the authorities to convert before bringing about the reformation.

Several Protestants who had attempted to distribute a version of the 1534 Lutheran placards at the Guibray fair were arrested on the orders of the premier président of Caen.

Some time in 1561, Protestants assumed control of Érnee in Normandy. Guise made a request of the junior lieutenant-general of Brittany, the sieur de Bouillé to reconquer the town. Bouillé informed the governor of Brittany that even though Érnee was outside his governate he had crossed the border to recapture the town, both due to the friendship Étampes had for the duc de Guise and due to the security risk of having a Protestant town on the border.

==== Brittany ====
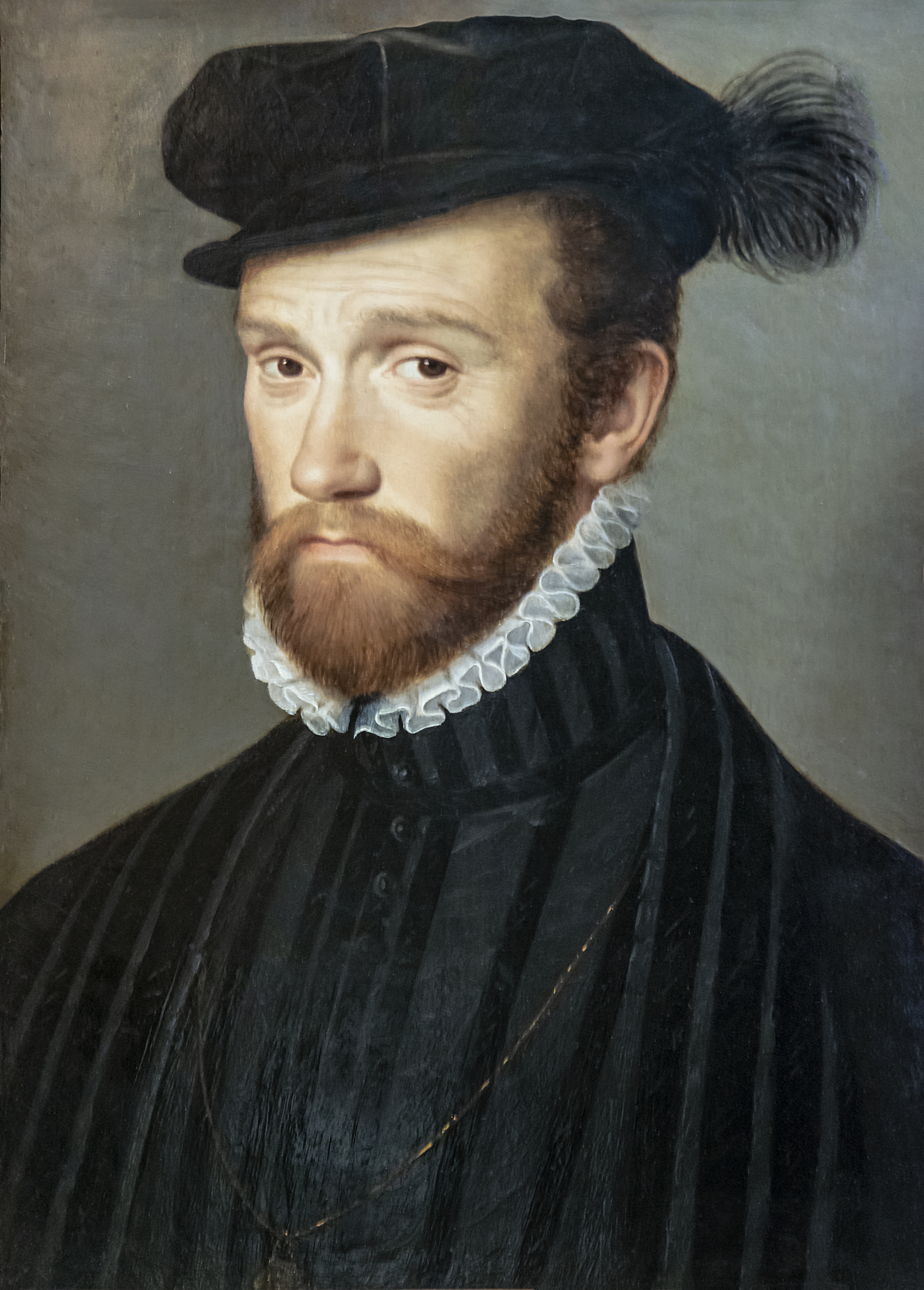
Senior lieutenant-general in Brittany, the victome de Martigues

A structured Protestant church had existed in Nantes since the Autumn of 1560. In July 1561 the Protestants of Nantes made a show of strength, parading through the porte Saint-Pierre under arms. Rumours swirled that they intended to seize one of the gates. A large reaction followed, with a Catholic riot on 1 August that destroyed a building in which worship was being conducted. The owner of the house petitioned for compensation from governor d'Étampes and this was granted. The junior lieutenant-generals of Brittany, the marquis de Bouillé joined the protest of the city administration of Nantes against the Edict of July to Étampes, the edicts mild language would in Bouillé's estimation only further disorders.

In the Autumn of 1561 the community had the strength to get the establishment of sites for Protestant worship added into their cahiers over the objections of the local First Estate. A Catholic petition protested against the Protestant move for churches, pleading with the king to ensure that no faith other than Catholicism was celebrated in the city. D'Andelot advocated for the Protestant community of Nantes personally, writing to the lieutenant-general of Brittany the vicomte de Martigues, who authorised the provision of a church in November. It would be burned down within a month by members of the cathedral chapter. In retaliation for the burning down of their church, the Protestants invaded the cathedral on horseback and threw projectiles at the altar. Several members of the city administration were denounced as 'capital enemies' by the more intolerant Catholics for their implied Protestant sympathies. The cities governor Sanzay and the conseil des bourgeois agreed the appropriate response to the invasion of the cathedral was the prohibition of Protestant assemblies and a reinforced guard on the gate.

Catherine felt the need in 1561, to ask the duc d'Étampes, governor of Brittany, to publicly declare his support for her government. Étampes would likewise request that Catherine and the king to send him letters he could show the nobles of Brittany to give them courage that he enjoyed their favour.

==== Touraine ====
The mayor of Tours was a Protestant, and had been since 1559. In October the Protestants of Tours had seized control of the church of the Franciscans only to be dislodged by Montpensier in his capacity as governor of Touraine.

Various disorders in Tours in late 1561 caused the court to dispatch the secrétaire d'État de Laubespine to the city. De Laubespine reported to Guise that the garrison had been distributed through the city. The people of Tours begged him to intercede with Guise and the crown in their defence. He therefore further informed Guise that the trouble makers had departed from the city, and therefore if any punishment was meted out against Tours, it would be against the innocent. Further he argued that the royal commander Richelieu was a rough man, and feeding his men at the expense of the people of Tours.

Montpensier, who had made himself infamous in his governate with the Protestants in 1560 for his summary conduct, travelled to Touraine to oversee the burial of his mother in July 1561. While in the territory he observed many Protestants, and decided to imprison around 140 of them in the town of Chinon. In response to this action, thousands of Protestants descended upon his residence, besieging him inside until he acquiesced to release those who he had locked up in Chinon.

==== Berry ====
After the arrest of Protestants in the Berry town of Issoudun, Coligny wrote to Catherine in their favour in April. He argued that if she looked at what the Protestants had been doing in the town she would find no seditions or any bearing of arms. He therefore implored her to see to their release and grant them permission to live openly in their faith alongside the Catholics.

==== Aunis ====
In La Rochelle, where Protestantism was dominant, the governor of the pays d'Aunis the seigneur de Jarnac who held authority over the city was only permitted entry in 1561 after the leaders of the city had convinced themselves that his conversion to Protestantism was genuine. He had been appointed to the charge back in 1559.

==== Saintonge ====
In this region during Lent there were around 38 Protestant pastors preaching sermons.

==== Guyenne ====
In early 1561, the lieutenant-general of Guyenne the seigneur de Burie made it known that his priority was to see to the defence of Bordeaux, and that the wider region would have to be protected by the local nobility. This was effective for several months but soon began to break down in the face of Protestant attacks.

Burie played a double game with the Protestants of the province. He allowed the parlement of Bordeaux to issue an arrêt which prohibited Protestant worship, but then secretly told the Protestant community that if they assembled in private he would not trouble them.

In the estimation of the contemporary baron de Biron, many lesser seigneurs in the region converted to Protestantism so as to avoid their tax obligations. Corteault observes tax collection increasingly becoming a flashpoint between Catholic lords and their tenants in this period.

In June, the comte de Crussol received commission from the crown to investigate what the Protestants of Guyenne were up to. The king informed him that he had heard several thousand pikes had been forged in the province and that the Protestants had raised 80,000 écus towards a planned goal of 450,000 écus. These facts concerned the crown and Crussol was charged with investigating their veracity, and soothing tensions in the troubled province. Burie informed Crussol that the Protestants had attacked churches and required punishment. Crussol did not stay long in Guyenne before being reassigned.

The royal order for churches to be restored to their original owners was not distributed in Guyenne out of fear that it would simply provoke a larger backlash.

In Bordeaux, the senior Catholic magistracy bemoaned that the Protestants were seeking to introduce their faith at the point of a sword, topple the crown and turn Guyenne into a series of cantons.

In February an armed group of the 'basoche' (the Catholic street gang associated with the Bordeaux parlement) marched on the gates of the collège de Guyenne (home of the 'écoliers' the Protestant street gang associated with the collège) intending to storm the collège and attack their enemies. Made aware of what was about to transpire, the parlement despatched soldiers to avoid a bloodbath. This accomplished an arrêt was issued by the parlement which chastised both sides. Both the basoche and écoliers were to relinquish their weapons, the latter were ordered to disestablish their military divisional structure while the former was denied the ability to elect a leader for a period. The Protestant écoliers redirected their attentions less militant illegal activities such as the chanting of psalms. The parlement would charge many of the écoliers who engaged in psalm singing.

In May, Burie was offered the services of 4,000 Catholics for the policing of Bordeaux however he refused. The offer was renewed by the parlement in June, with the body highlighting that it would free up professional troops to police the countryside.

The captain of the guard was arrested on suspicion of having aided in the jailbreak of several Protestants from prison in September, and after his trial the following April was removed from his post.

In late 1561, the parlement attempted to requisition 80 men from the garrisons of the châteaux to augment the city guard. The captains of each château refused, pleading their own insufficient resources. The parlement therefore turned to a Catholic militia formed of their own members. Burie objected, and his objection was only overcome when the militia was subordinated to the jurat (Bordeaux's city council) with oversight from the capitaine du guet (captain of the watch).

On 21 November, the Protestants of Bordeaux attempted an assault on the château de Trompette, the key to the cities defence. However, the garrison and its commander remained firm and resisted the assault. This assault was too much for the parlement and in December, after another furious denunciation of Burie's leadership a syndicate of the courts lawyers was formed (with their own militia). After tricking the Protestant members of the body into signing a declaration they were all suspended from the court. The court requested the crown send Catholic troops to the province to restore order. When the moderate premier président of the parlement returned in January 1562 he declared the decisions of the court illegal and denounced their ring leaders.

One of Burie's lieutenants named the sieur de Savignac de Thouars was active in the Agenais. The parlementaires of Bordeaux complained to Burie that Savignac was operating a vigilante force of around 2,000 men who were dispensing harsh punishments on the Catholic population. Burie also entrusted the Protestant sieur de Mesmy with leading one of the patrols in the region, but he was so despised by the Catholics that when captured in 1562 he would be summarily executed on the orders of the Bordeaux parlement.

In Clairac, Tonneins, Montflanquin and Saint-Livrade reports arrived to Burie by August that the Catholic priests had been chased from their churches. In Villeneuve, Penne and Nérac it was the Cordeliers who had been removed from their monasteries by the Protestants.

In August Protestants undertook attacks on two châteaux, those of Thouars and Frégimont. These belonged to the seigneur de Montpezat. Montpezat enjoyed a brutal reputation in the Agenais, and had conducted attacks on the Protestant churches of Libos, Tournon and La Plume. A key figure in the Protestant opposition to Montpezat was the seigneurs elder brother Antoine de Montpezat who had been disinherited by their father. The elder brother had converted to Protestantism and as early as 1558 led attacks on the châteaux of Lagnac and Frégimont.

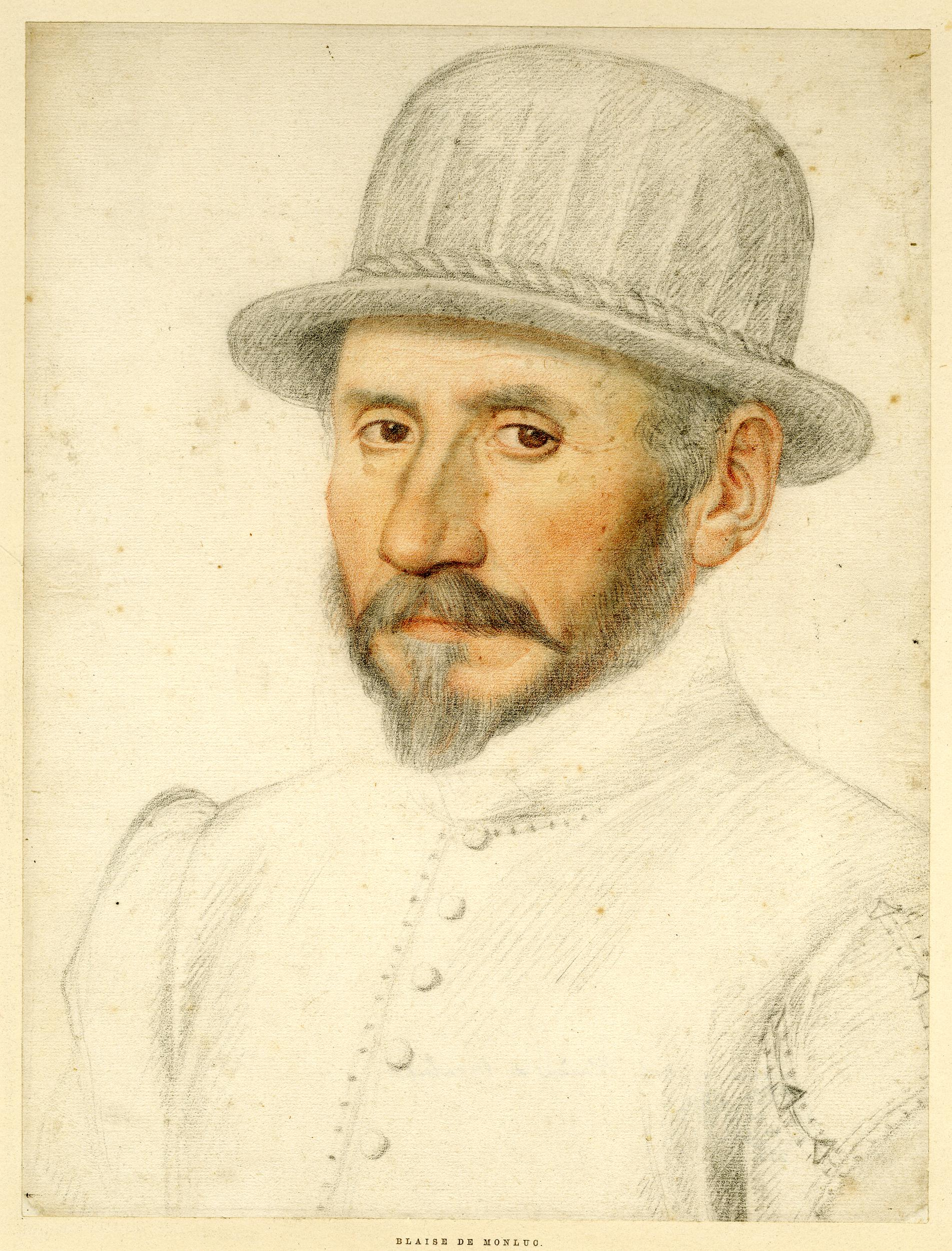
Seigneur de Monluc, future marshal and lieutenant-general of Guyenne, commander in the latter Italian Wars

In February Monluc returned to Agen and authorised the consuls of the town to guard the gates. By this means he hoped to make visible the Catholic coalitions responsibility for the protection of the city. The militia was expanded at this time. The treasures of the cathedral and the churches were moved to a nearby château for their protection. They then turned to attack the Protestants for the recent disorders.

The crown, keen to avoid escalation, imposed a truce on the region. The militia was stood down, Monluc's forces withdrew from Agen and Protestants were allowed to attend the councils once more. Catholic grandees were unhappy that the amnesty meant that Protestant prisoners would be released, and soon the military council was revived. The crown received various petitions from the Catholics highlighting the armed Protestant gatherings for worship, causing the crown to respond with a ban on gatherings at the risk of fines and imprisonment.

After acts of Protestant iconoclasm in Agen, the Protestant minister of the city decided to work alongside the judiciary of the city to aid in seeing those responsible punished. In the ministers fears, the iconoclasm threatened to take on the character of rebellion which might disrupt the social order.

Protestant artisans oversaw the conduct of iconoclasm in the city and bemoaned that if they waited for their consistory (administrative body of the fledgeling church) to act nothing would ever happen. The Protestants of Agen reported to Calvin in September that they had banished Catholicism from the city and surrounding area. This purge of Catholicism involved some violence, and thus the lieutenant of Bordeaux was preparing to suppress them, bringing together men that even included those of the king of Navarre. The report to Calvin noted with concern that the Protestants weapons might be seized as part of this process.

After having visited various communities of both faiths across the Agenais counselling patience, Burie arrived in Agen on 3 October. He argued that confrontation was not the answer and proposed that when intervention was required from higher authorities, that the city look to the sénéchal d'Agenais to resolve matters. Burie was able to get the city council to agree to a bi-confessional chamber on 20 October.

The Catholics of Agen grew to develop a distaste for the bi-confessional chamber arguing it was too lenient on the Protestants. In January 1562 they gained the agreement of the sénéchal d'Agenais that Protestants needed to be excluded from the jurade and présidial court, he concurred.

A famous incident occurred in Fumel in November. The baron de Fumel's château was approached by a furious band of rioters. This band of rioters contained both Protestant and Catholic peasants. Fumel (the former French ambassador to the Ottoman Empire) was a brutal lord known for ruthlessly enforcing his seigneurial prerogatives. He also had a history of dispersing Protestant gatherings in his domains. It was in response to this that the Protestant consistory had issued a call to arms. He appeared on his terrace and was struck by several salvos from sharpshooter rioters below. The people of the town of Fumel, who were largely complicit in the assassination closed their gates, meanwhile the crossings over the Lot were guarded, this allowed the assassination to occur without interference from other authorities. When the baron's servants attempted to locate a doctor, they were arrested and detained in the house of the urban consuls. The rioters set the entrance to the château on fire and invade the residence, finding the baron wounded in bed. He was stabbed to death with various implements. The château was then pillaged, while the baron's wife and son were terrorised before being taken off to the prison of Fumel. The papers and records in the château are also burned. Denouncing him as a 'wicked persecutor' the baron's killers then departed singing psalms. Though the sénéschal of Agen would soon see that the baron received a proper burial, the people of Fumel would spend the next several months keeping Fumel isolated from the outside world.

While it is certain some of those involved in the Fumel affair were Protestant, it is unlikely all were. Nevertheless, the affair was quickly worked into anti-Protestant propaganda. The parlement of Bordeaux ignored the participation of Catholic peasants in their characterisation of the event as a Protestant revolt. Also ignored was the fact that the Cluniac priory and Fumel's church were left untouched. In Carroll's examination of the named suspects, he observes that there were 44 artisans and 14 notables among their number, but no nobleman. The local Protestant nobleman remained aloof from involvement. Crouzet's analysis of the named suspects highlights many of the involved were not Fumel's tenants and came from elsewhere. He therefore argues in favour of a religious motivation. Monluc would be charged in 1562 with leading the suppression of this particular revolt. He sequestered 8 hardliner Catholic officials from Agen to sit on a judicial panel. He had around 30-40 Protestants in Fumel hanged. The houses of around 200 participants were to be razed and the town of Fumel stripped of its liberties (and walls) with a fine of 320,000 livres to pay as reparation. Notably however the ring leaders of the killing escaped punishment. Monluc's narrative of the crime highlighted it as an illustration of the revolutionary societal foundation shaking tenets of Protestantism. By this means it was hoped to scare off the nobility from sympathy with Protestantism. It also served for Monluc as justification for the brutal campaign he had been waging against Gascon Protestants in the proceeding months. According to Monluc, the attacks on Fumel were only one part of a larger series of planned attacks, and it was only by his executions that he stopped a similar rising at Saint-Mézard. The organiser in his estimation was a lawyer from Lectoure who was a client of Navarre's. Throughout this time however, Monluc was in the business of intimidation, not combat. It is only in April 1562 neither siege nor military engagement were in his repertoire.

Rural peasants in the Garonne valley did not content themselves with burning churches and abbeys, but further attacked châteaux, sometimes even going after the seigneur as part of the attack. In August the seigneur de Levignac was forced to flee his château after it was attacked by around '2,000 thieves'. Levignac's neighbours, the sieurs de Lestelle and Thouars also had their residences ransacked. Carroll opines that a state of civil war already existed in Guyenne in 1561.

In Marmande the convent of the Cordeliers was razed by Protestant vigilantes with several killed in the process.

==== Foix ====
The Protestants of Foix engaged in the looting of the cities churches during December. The Protestant minister of the city attempted to intervene to stop them, however he was seized by his co-religionists and dragged off back to his home.

==== Languedoc ====
Montmorency, and his lieutenant-general in Languedoc, Joyeuse came in for stern rebuke from Catherine in early October. She ordered that the repression conducted by Joyeuse in the province by moderated, and chided the constable for the many complaints rising up from the province. Montmorency, not used to such criticism from the crown took solace in the fact he was being attacked for his religion. Joyeuse was instructed to allow the Protestants to see to their own regulation and discipline.

The lettres de cachet provided by the crown for religious prisoners were greeted coolly by the parlement of Toulouse. After stalling in their registration, they adopted a strict approach to their execution, with all released prisoners made to swear their abjuration. The comte de Crussol protested that they modified the edict so greatly that it was almost 'formed anew'.

In March, one of the capitouls of Toulouse (leaders of the civic government), participated in the provincial estates of Languedoc and during their course proposed that royal finance be resolved through the alienation of church property. Such a proposal was greeted with horror by some Catholic parlementaires who went to court to argue that instead Protestant property should be put towards the royal debt.

By 1561 the Protestant students of the university were growing increasingly confident in their militancy. Around 400 gathered outside the house of the premier président of the parlement to demand a place for Protestant worship. The students regularly clashed with the basochiens (musicians and actors who performed at Catholic ceremonies composed of members of the courts of Toulouse) despite attempts to see each side disarmed and the students kept from roaming the city. The city guard struggled to maintain order between the groups, and found itself forced to ask for support from other bodies in keeping order.

In response to this, the capitouls raised a subsidiary force of 100 men to be subordinated to the captain of the guard. Even this was proving insufficient by late 1561 and the capitouls raised further citizens into supporting roles. The Catholic dominated parlement took issue with these moves, arguing the new guardsmen were disproportionately Protestant and that this Protestant guard was inviting more of their coreligionists through the cities gates. The parlement estimated there were around 4,000 Protestants in the city.

On 1 September the sieur de Terride was appointed as governor of Toulouse in the hopes of quieting the troubles. He garrisoned all his forces in the city and removed the capitouls authority over the guard. The capitouls were incensed at this insult on their urban privileges and Terride's militant Catholic credentials. In December they succeeded in getting Terride recalled by the crown, to be replaced by the comte de Crussol. The appointment of Crussol was greeted with horror by the Catholics of Toulouse.

A Protestant consistory was established in Toulouse in January 1562. A Catholic syndicate formed in opposition. It was led by two présidents of the parlement from March 1562.

The bishop of Montpellier fled his city in July. Joyeuse, lieutenant-general of Languedoc, despaired in a letter to Montmorency about the situation in Montpellier on 30 September. He highlighted to Montmorency that he had only 50 arquebusiers to his name, and that the seizure of the great church of Our Lady in Montpellier had been undertaken by a group of 3,000 Protestants. Further his force had to be spread across a province which was increasingly falling to Protestant control. In his estimation the Protestants had secured Lavaur, Réalmont, Rabastens, Revel and Castres.

Around 19 October, the garrison and clergy camped out in the cathedral of Saint-Pierre as the Protestants attempted to seize the building. A shot was fired by one of the defenders, which led to an explosion of rage from the Protestants. Over the next few days the cathedral was captured and subject to a thorough pillage, with 30-40 Catholics killed, among whom were 3 canons. The Protestant consuls of Montpellier tried to organise inventories of the captured objects and avoid looting but this was in vain.

In Montauban, Protestants compelled a priest to ride a donkey upside down while holding its tail. The priest was dragged to the square where their vestments were burned and the host trampled. In August the drive to iconoclasm saw all statues destroyed be they in public churches or private residences, with paintings also attacked wherever they were found.

The consistory of Nîmes declared that they deferred to the court in matters of acquiring churches, and in the meanwhile the seizure of churches was prohibited. The opposition to church seizure was expressed in a letter to the Protestant community of Montpellier during August. Nevertheless, in September Nîmois Protestants, led by men of high birth, seized the church of the Franciscans in the city. Though the Protestant consistory of the city protested that they were uncomfortable with such violent acts, they voted by a decision of 7–5 to accept the acquisition of the first seized church. This was justified on the grounds that its acquisition had not required violence, and that they needed it. Those who had taken it were to be punished however. Pierre Viret who visited Nîmes would preach in the church in early October. The consistory placed guards on the church and informed a nearby community it could emulate Nîmes, as long as any seizures didn't involve bloodshed. During October the consistory began to militarise, with the establishment of a militia under the command of eight captains. In total there would be four Protestant attacks on the churches of Nîmes in 1561 (29 September and 8, 15 and 21 December). On 15 December the bishop of Nîmes was intimidated by crowds into handing two more churches to the Protestants. He was forced to flee from the cathedral after an iconoclastic riot invaded the premises on 21 December, heading to Arles. The violence moved from a desire to acquire places of worship to a desire to eliminate Catholicism from the city as the year progressed.

On 6 December a new consular election was held. The crown proved unwilling to replicate the imposition of Catholic consuls that it had undertaken by coup the prior year. Therefore, the Protestants, who had grown considerably in strength since the last election were able to dominate the process in numbers. The Catholic nominations of the outgoing consuls was disregarded by the electors who almost all voted for Protestant candidates.

As early as October several members of religious houses in Millau abandoned their orders. The Protestants of Millau were not content to leave abandonment to voluntary choice, and over the next several months the various religious houses of Millau were broken into with the inhabitants threatened by masked men. Finally the convent of the Celestines was set on fire.

In Villefranche, a Protestant was assassinated by a sniper lodged in the bell tower of the Cordeliers convent. In revenge some Protestants killed a priest during the pronouncement of mass on 22 July.

During October, the lieutenant-general of Languedoc Joyeuse found himself in trouble with the crown for his role in a violent episode against the Protestants of Béziers. One of his subordinates had become involved in an incident the result of which was several dead. The crown chastised Joyeuse for such a 'great scandal'.

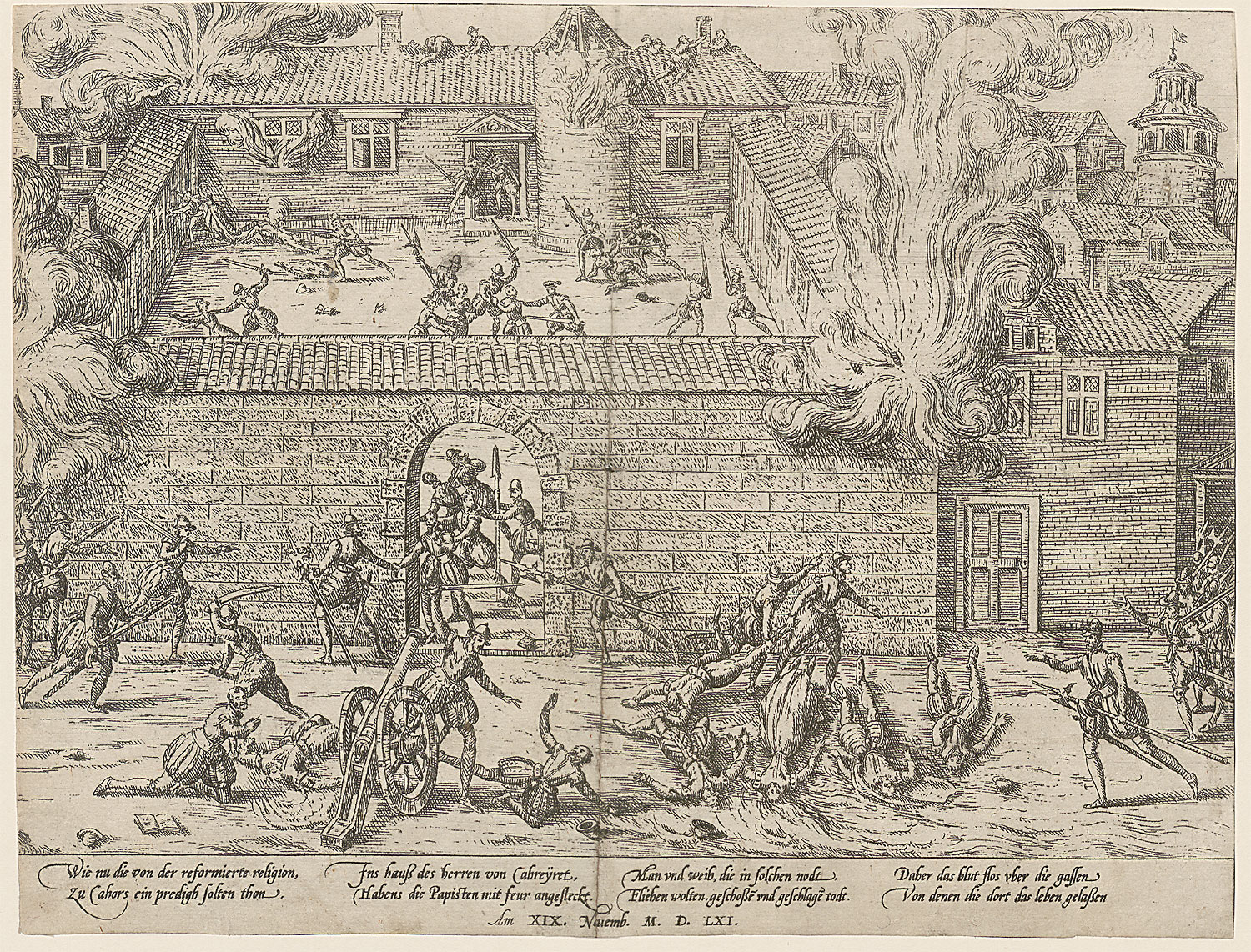
Massacre of Protestants in Cahors in 1561

On 19 November, a group of Protestants were worshipping in a private house in Cahors. A group of Catholics who were assembling for mass became aware of this. The house in which the Protestants were worshipping was set on fire, with those attempting to flee the inferno were massacred by the crowd of Catholics outside. Around 30 Protestants were killed, their bodies thrown into a pyre.

Similarly, in Carcassonne there was a massacre of Protestants in December.

==== Comtat Venaissin ====
A Protestant prayer meeting at Villeneuve lès Avignon was stormed by Papal soldiers in 1561. They murdered seven of the attendees, parading the liver of one of their victims on an iron rod.

On 19 October, the Pope dispatched his nephew, Fabrizzio di Serbelloni to Avignon for the purpose of defending the Papal territory against Protestant attacks. To this end he was instructed to get into contact with the cardinal de Tournon or even Philip II if necessary.

Serbelloni began raising troops in Avignon to 'guard his estates from the Protestants'. Rumour reached the French court that his plans would involve Spanish troops. Therefore, the king had Serbelloni watched and meanwhile ordered troops raised in Marseille, with the city reinforced. The seigneur de Saint-Sulpice and the principe di Salerno (prince of Salerno) were entrusted with investigating Avignon. Saint-Sulpice noted Catherine's disapproval at the mustering of troops without her being informed of their purpose. Salerno wrote to Charles that his subjects were being recruited by Serbelloni and that the Papal commander had failed to punish the perpetrators of the killings of French Protestants at Villeneuve-lès-Avignon. He was also reinforcing Avignon. In light of the above Salerno counselled the king get Serbelloni removed.

After this, Joyeuse was put on notice of a potential Spanish threat, and the cardinal di Ferrara instructed to warn Serbelloni of the king's resolve to bring troops to bear against him if he kept recruiting troops inside France. Joyeuse informed the king there were no Spanish moves on the frontier. Charles wrote directly to Serbelloni informing him that if he needed troops for his protection, he was to use royal troops, the Papal commander was then obliquely threatened.

==== Dauphiné and Lyonnais ====
The provincial Protestant synods of Dauphiné and the Lyonnais argued that Protestant military organisation should be conducted separately to that of the local consistories. This was a response to developments already underway in the provinces. By this means the consistory could focus on purely religious affairs.

On Corpus Christi day in Lyon the Catholic priest who was carrying the host was attacked by a Protestant.

==== Provence ====
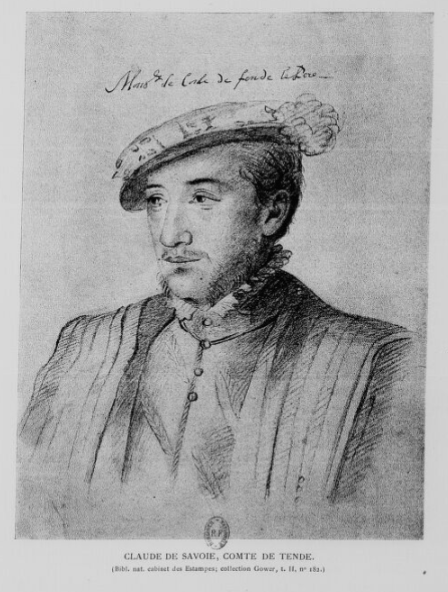
Comte de Tende, governor of Provence

The seigneur de Mauvans returned to his campaigns in Provence during 1561. It was with his force that iconoclasm became a systematic process. Catholic peasants of the region therefore took up arms to defend against his attacks. They did not limit themselves to this however and also directed their defence against actions by Catholic lords.

There were disorders in Aix-en-Provence, that Catherine and the king felt the governor the comte de Tende was too mild in his repression of. They wrote to him urging him to crush the authors of the disorder and humiliated him for his failures to have properly maintained order. While Tende stalled in his repression, a Catholic vigilante organisation took the lead in crushing Protestantism in Provence. This aristocratic movement was known as the 'Flassans' after its leader the seigneur de Flassans, the governor of Aix. Flassans led forces that called themselves chevaliers de la foi (knights of the faith). His men stalked the province with white wool crosses on their hats led by a Cordelier brandishing a crucifix. This Catholic vigilante force was largely composed of nobles who had been demobilised by the end of the Italian Wars.

At the instigation of the Flassans, gibbets were raised in Manosque, Valensole and Marseille. The terror he engaged in was equal to that of Mauvans, and peasants learned to fear both groups. It was reported to the crown despairingly in December that Flassan's armed men had interrupted the provincial estates of Provence. The Catholic rebels considered the possibility of joining up with the Papal commander Fabrizzio di Serbelloni.

=== Responses ===
==== Catholic Leagues ====
In several cities, leagues were founded with the purpose of bringing about the extermination of Protestantism. In the Agenais, in response to complaints that the local Protestants were terrorising the priests and people a noble Catholic league was created in October. The goal of the league was both to protect Catholicism, and to act as a network to better be able to respond to new Protestant 'seditions'. Heading the league was the lieutenant-general of Guyenne, the seigneur de Burie, who had written to Navarre to express his distress at the death of Fumel; also involved was the seigneur de Nègrepelisse and a host of nobles from Quercy, Armagnac, Rouergue, Comminges, Périgord, alongside those of the Agenais. As soon as this league had tracked down some of the perpetrators of Fumel's killing, Burie disassociated himself from the body. A similar league was established in Dieppe in April with the goal of exterminating Protestants. A lawyer of Bordeaux established a league which boasted 3,000 armed members that were divided across the city to protect the Catholic faith. The league of Bordeaux was a reaction to the 'softness' of Navarre and Burie to Protestantism.

==== Subordinate-governors ====
In the south of the kingdom, provincial governors were authorised to establish new governors subordinate to themselves to combat the various disorders. These new subordinate governors would have responsibility for seizing arms and suppressing rebellion. By 1572, the diocese of Castres alone (one of the twenty two dioceses of Languedoc) would be home to 24 governors.

=== Crussol's mission ===
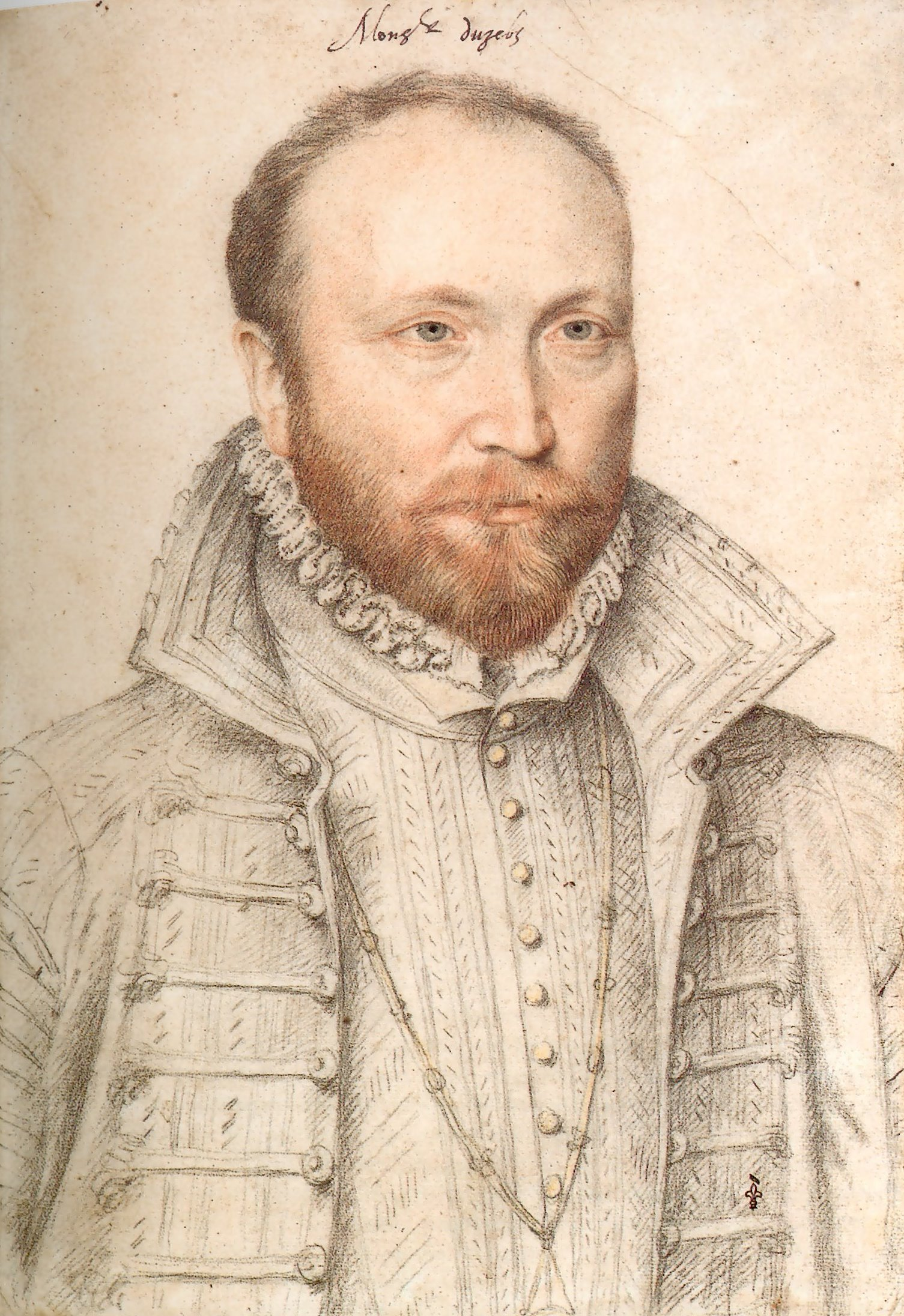
Comte de Crussol, chevalier d'honneur of Catherine de' Medici and leader of the pacification missions in the south of France

On 10 December the king wrote to the comte de Crussol to charge him with overseeing the restoration of order in the Midi. For this purpose he was to have five gendarme companies and several hundred arquebusiers. He was appointed by Catherine as lieutenant and commander in Languedoc. He was tasked by the crown with ensuring the Catholics and Protestants of Languedoc, Dauphiné and Provence enjoyed a state of 'good friendship'. This was difficult, given the aggression with which the communities were fighting in the south at this time. Some Catholics saw his appointment as a clear win for the Protestants of their provinces. In each province he was to collaborate with the lieutenant-general (Languedoc, Guyenne, Dauphiné) or governor (Provence) of the province to see to the maintenance of the king's edicts and the punishment of those who contravened them. In Dauphiné he was to see that those bearing weapons were disarmed and employ good caution. Concerning Languedoc the king warned Crussol that it was possible the perpetrators of scandals in the province might be so powerful that Joyeuse was unable to bring them to justice. With soldiers at his back, Crussol was to destroy those who impeded his commission and gain entry to towns by force if necessary. All officials were to obey Crussol as were he the king. Crussol would be working alongside commissioners to achieve his aims in each province.

Commissions of two parlementaires were established for each of the provinces in question. Sent out before the publishing of the Edict of Saint-Germain, the commissioners had the advantage of being present on the ground to immediately work towards its implementation. They would have the power to investigate and judge various offences, release prisoners and examine the conduct of the existing judicial apparatus.

==== Comtat Venaissin ====
Crussol's first task was to respond to the threat Serbelloni was making in the Papal territories. Charles and Catherine wrote to the Papal commander that he was to expect Crussol's arrival, and receive him as he would the king.

Crussol would meet with Serbelloni however the outcome of the meeting is unknown.

==== Lyonnais and Dauphiné ====
Arriving in Lyon around the end of December, Crussol ordered the Protestants confine their preaching to outside the cities walls and had the people disarmed. From Lyon he moved to Valence where he treated with the governor La Place to get the Protestants to worship outside the walls and contain their passions, though he was to see that they were protected. Dauphinois Protestants from Romans requested he offer them support against the lieutenant-general of Dauphiné.

On 10 January Crussol arrived at Villeneuve-lès-Avignon, establishing the town as his base of operations. From here he summoned several Nîmois Protestants to answer to the charges that they had seized churches. They protested to him that there had been no killing or sedition with their seizures, and they appealed to the royal council. Crussol chided them and ordered they abandon the churches and return the Catholic assets they had acquired. Several days later on 13 January he issued an ordonnance in which he described himself as a lieutenant-general and outlined the instructions he had been provided in his commission. The destruction of Catholic property and attacking of churches were deplored alongside the 'murders and seditions'.

==== Languedoc ====
The commissioners despatched to Languedoc were Michel Quelain and Jean de La Guesle., they told the king that they found a province in chaos. In Languedoc, the pleas for royal intervention largely came from the Catholics. As in Provence, Crussol held responsibilities for ensuring the enforcement of religious peace in Languedoc. However, he was not present in the province himself so the commissioners looked to the lieutenant general Joyeuse to assist them. The Protestants of the region looked to the commissioners to preserve their assumed right to worship in Nîmes and Montpellier.

Crussol would exert himself over the eastern parts of the province of Languedoc that were near his estates. In these regions Protestantism had even penetrated the rural communities.

The Protestants of Nîmes decided to obey Crussol and return the churches in their possession. The bishop and priests were able to return, celebrating mass on 18 January. However, angry Protestant crowds resented the surrendering of churches back to the Catholics and prevented the conduct of worship in two parish churches. Crussol ordered the arrest of several Catholics of Nîmes also.

In Montpellier Crussol also desired to see the return of churches to the Catholics and sent requests to this effect. On 22 January the keys were handed back to the Catholics. These measures led to the throwing of stones when it was attempted to re-introduce mass into the city.

Crussol noted with approval to Catherine that the subduing of Nîmes and Montpellier was not as challenging as he had feared it might be. Meanwhile, the Protestant pastor Viret urged his flock to obey Crussol in abandoning the churches they had seized and rejecting weapons. He extolled them to follow the terms of the edict of Saint-Germain or be subject to force of arms from the comte de Crussol. Crussol moved on from Languedoc to Provence, leaving Languedoc in the hands of Quelain and La Guesle.

By May 1562, with Crussol having been recalled to court, the lieutenant-general of Languedoc wrote to Catherine, summarising the endless seditions that dominated the province, before noting that "Crussol will say to you in what state he is leaving affairs".

==== Provence ====
Antoine Fumée and André de Ponnat were the two parlementaires charged with restoring order in Provence. Though despatched in November, they would not assume their responsibilities prior to early February, around when the parlement of Aix was considering the Edict of Saint-Germain. They were to collaborate with local judicial authorities unless the local judiciary proved compromised against their mission. To assist them in the establishment of order they were expected to collaborate with the governor of Provence the comte de Tende, and the comte de Crussol who had been established as lieutenant-general for the pacification of Provence. Crussol's appointment to this charge had earned rebuke from the parlement on account of suspicions of his Protestant leanings.

The commissioners faced off against the sieur de Flassans who led the extreme anti-Protestants of Provence in a reign of terror. The commissioners summoned Flassans to meet with them, but he declined, and likewise refused to disarm. Crussol (who had entered Provence at the end of January), wrote to Catherine asking her to send letters to Flassans and the leader of the parlement of Aix instructing them to leave Provence.

Flassans defiantly announced that the Edict of January only applied to regions that had asked for it like Paris and Orléans. As a result, he was declared a rebel and subjected to a military campaign.

Initially denied entry to Aix, the commissioners set themselves up at Marignane and established an assembly, inviting all parties to present and explain themselves. The authorities of Aix complied with the exception of Flassans. They tried to justify their obstructionism, but were dismissed. After the capitulation of the clergy on 5 February, the commissioners moved into Aix and spoke before the parlement. Crussol and the comte de Tende also entered Aix at this time. The Protestants were given a site for their worship, the populace was disarmed and the edict of Saint-Germain forced through the parlement. Officers of the crown aligned with Flassans including those in the parlement were purged by the crown. It was their goal, they said, to deal with seditions. The parlement responded positively, and aided them in the purge of the consulate. Having published the prior edicts of the crown and got to work ensuring they were observed. Crussol was increasingly apprehensive about the success of his mission, and requested more troops from the crown. In a meeting with the local commander, they declared that it was the king's wish that Protestants and Catholics live with one another in harmony. Fumée and Ponnat were pleased to report in March that Aix was now at peace.

At a distance from Marseille the commissioners feared their ability to enforce justice there would be hampered.

==== Guyenne ====
The commissioners despatched to Guyenne were Nicolas de Compaing and Guillaume Girard. De Bèze implored the Protestants of Guyenne to abandon their support of seditions and work with the two commissioners. It was expected that Crussol and the commander Blaise de Monluc would enforce the judgements of the commissioners. Despite the lieutenant-general of Guyenne, the seigneur de Burie, greatly desiring the commissioners presence, they were delayed in their arrival until the end of February. Therefore, in their absence several parlementaires from Bordeaux were deputised to fill in for them. These two would also be delayed, and in the end Monluc and Burie found themselves dissatisfied with both sets of commissioners. Those of Bordeaux were inexperienced and had remits too limited for the needs of the situation. Those of the crown were 'so favourable towards the Protestants that Monluc and Burie were subject to many complaints'. Monluc would claim in his memoires that they were some of the most extreme Protestants in the kingdom. They therefore requested the crown send new commissioners. The parlement meanwhile attempted to get their commissioners adopted by the crown, arguing that it was the easiest alternative to bringing in outsiders, and had worked well for prior kings.

In Monluc's estimation the royally appointed men had set to work prosecuting 'innocent' Catholics in Cahors, which he felt was deliberate revenge for his prosecution of the perpetrators of the Fumel killing. Girard and Compaing were in fact beginning with the prosecution of those responsible for a massacre of Protestants in Cahors. When Burie and Monluc decided to move over to the Agenais they requested the commissioners come with them, but the commissioners rebuffed them. Therefore, Burie and Monluc turned to alternative commissioners.

At Moissac, Compaing and Girard intervened against an unauthorised gathering of nobles in the town, they requested a list of names of those who had gathered at Moissac. This earned them the enmity of the nobles who complained to Monluc and Burie.

Compaing and Girard would disagree with Monluc and Burie most seriously over the matter of the Edict of Saint-Germain. The former argued the latter had misinterpreted the edict by seeking to prohibit the presence of Protestant ministers in places they had not operated previously. The two commissioners asked the crown to write a clarification to them endorsing their understanding that this interpretation simply punished those who had been law abiding in prior times. The cardinal d'Armagnac also protested against the commissioners, arguing that for a minister to be established in a community the permission of the relevant seigneur, priest and church warden was required. Armagnac was misinterpreting the edict, this was only a requirement for travelling ministers. The complaints from all the grandees led to the removal of Compaing and Girard.

Complaints arose from Bordeaux of provocative militant demonstrations by the cities Protestants. Burie leant his support to the Protestant community of the city, agreeing with them that the city had unfairly been blocking their rights to bury their dead as they desired.

Catherine considered a further means by which to see to the reconciliation of the religions in the Midi. This was to be through the dispatch of Condé to the Midi so that he might oversee disarmament, the return of property and bring about an end looting. He would also offer benefits to his co-religionists through the identification of sites outside cities for Protestant worship. This plan which found strong objections from Philip II, was never implemented.

=== Reconciliation ===
After 12 July, Guise again departed court, and spends time in Picardy, before travelling to Calais in August for the departure of Marie Stuart to Scotland. She left accompanied by Aumale, Elbeuf, the grand prieur and Montmorency's son Damville on 15 August. Established in Scotland she understood from the example of the reign of François II that repression was no longer an effective religious policy. When approached by Scottish Catholics she rebuffed them, though she would not adopt Protestantism. Determined to play a part in the royal project of the Autumn, Guise returns to court on 23 August joining with his brother who had arrived on 29 July.

Lorraine enjoyed a productive interview with the English ambassador after his return to court at the end of July, keen to rebuild bridges with the English crown now the families fortunes in Scotland were on the rise again. The two discussed church reform, and when Lorraine became aware of a Catholic pamphlet from Lyon which decried Elizabeth as a 'Jezebel', he made efforts to get its author arrested. Seeing Lorraine as sympathetic to Lutheranism, the ambassador made quick appeals to get a translated copy of the English Prayer Book for him.

A reconciliation was staged between Condé and Guise on 24 August in the residence of Montmorency - who was sick. Guise announced to Condé that he had played no role in his imprisonment, Condé replied that he considered the instigators of his imprisonment to be wicked, to which Guise agreed, again stating that it did not effect him. It was observed on an outward level. The 'farcical' reconciliation was largely necessary so as to facilitate the possibility of the upcoming Colloquy going ahead. Without it, the two men would not be present at court together at the same time. For Guise he could not hope to remain part of the government if he ignored the parlements judgement of Condé's innocence, further it allowed him to continue to build his reputation for magnanimity. Guise and Montmorency visited Catherine on 28 August at midnight to darkly observe that they understood Catholics of the kingdom to be arming, and that there was a risk of the kingdom being split in two.

The reconciliation between Condé and Guise was achieved just before the arrival of the queen of Navarre at court. In the estimation of the Venetian ambassador this was fortuitous as he believed she would surely have sabotaged the efforts. Relations had greatly deteriorated between the queen and her husband since her conversion. Not only did the king of Navarre make fun of her religion at court, but he had also taken to seeing another woman during her absence. The queen had written angrily to the cardinal d'Armagnac accusing him of being the cause of her husband's fall into error. She brought with her to court her children the prince de Béarn and Catherine. The queen mother greeted her warmly and lodged her in the finest apartments of Saint-Germain for the upcoming Colloquy.

=== Colloquy of Poissy ===
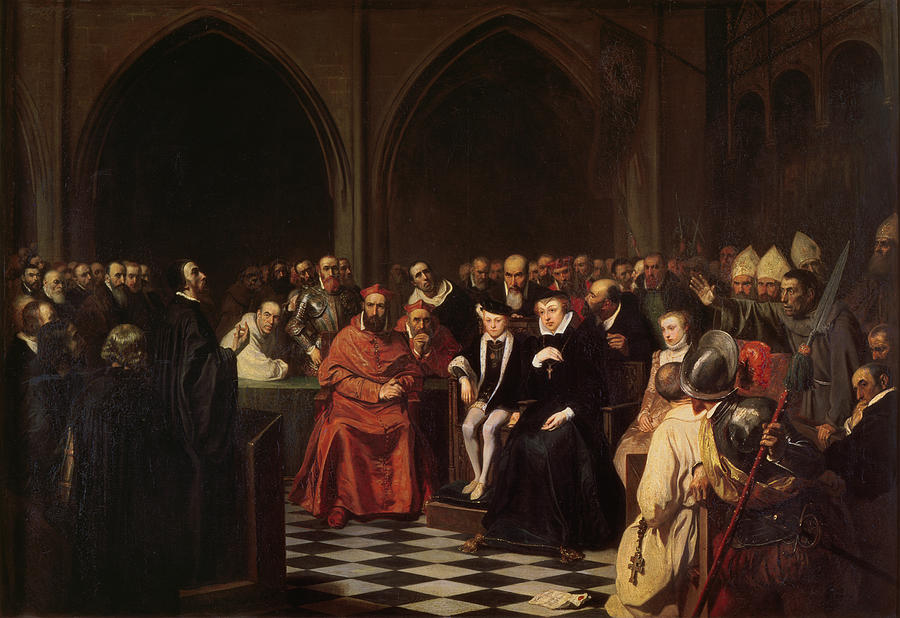
De Bèze delivers his oration to the Catholic clergy and royal family during the Colloquy of Poissy

Letters calling for the convocation of a Colloquy, with Protestants invited, were issued on 25 July. At this time, Catherine enjoyed greater relations with her Protestant advisers than the Catholic ones. According to the cardinal di Ferrara, Catherine complained that those Catholics around her showed a lack of gratitude, while the Protestants were very deferential.

In August a dialogue was scheduled to take pace between Protestants and Catholic prelates. Only five of the invited Catholic prelates objected to the Protestants getting a chance to say their piece. Nevertheless, around half of the French bishops assembled at Poissy would not attend the colloquy. At the suggestion of the bishop of Valence an invitation was sent to Geneva to send Protestant representatives for the discussions. Coligny requested of de Bèze that he participate, and he agreed. De Bèze therefore travelled into France to represent the Protestant party. The convening of the colloquy was already seen as a success by the Protestants, a chance to expound their religious views, the 'intrinsic validity of which would naturally bring about the conversion of those present'. In an initial meeting between de Bėze and Lorraine the two had a positive interaction in which they found much agreement on matters of religion between their two positions. Lorraine opened the meeting by announcing that he knew de Bèze only through his works, which had caused much disorder in the kingdom. De Bèze denied that he had written 'Le Tigre' and told Lorraine he accorded him too much influence. Lorraine then asked whether de Bèze had written a passage implying Christ was equally present in the eucharist and mud. De Bèze denied this, outlining the Calvinist position to which Lorraine highlighted the Lutheran one. After further questioning Lorraine and de Bèze appeared to reach agreement on the mass and the two men concluded with an embrace, Lorraine noting 'you will find I am not as black as they make me out to be'. The moderate Catholics at the conference were ready to make certain concessions, such as taking communion in both kinds, modifications to the ritual of baptism to increase its simplicity and a reduction in the cult of images. These concessions were the limit for some moderates like Claude d'Espence and the bishop of Valence. However these concessions did not effect the core issues such as the real presence, which would prove far more difficult. Navarre, Catherine and L'Hôpital looked to the Protestant Confession of Augsburg as a key stepping stone to the establishment of religious unity in the kingdom.

Saint-André, who vociferously opposed the convocation of the colloquy had to depart court in early September.

On 9 September the colloquy proper opened, in attendance the royal family, the princes du sang, the councillors of the king, forty archbishops and bishops, twelve theologians and other canon lawyers. For the Protestant party, there were twelve theologians, chief among them de Bèze. L'Hôpital opened proceedings, reminding the Catholic prelates present that they could treat with the Protestants, who were not Arian or Manichaean and abided by the four major councils, the scripture and the apostolic creed. The Protestant preachers were then ushered in, under the protection of Guise's guard, to begin proceedings. De Bèze got off to a promising start for the prospect of compromise, striking an ecumenical tone and avoiding complex matters of doctrine. He aroused furore however when during his address he turned to the matter of transubstation. He remarked that while Christ was present during the transubstantiation, the body of Christ was as far from the bread and wine of Mass as the heavens were from the earth. The Catholic prelates present erupted in outrage, with the most firm among them the cardinal de Tournon exploding in a cry of 'blasphemy' before he turned and remarked to Catherine how she could possibly allow such horrible things to be said in front of the young king and her other children. His remarks reflected a general concern among the more rigidly Catholic nobility that Catherine was leading the royal family towards Protestantism. With difficulty de Bèze concluded his speech. Tournon asked that his speech be printed so that the Catholics could prepare their response which was to be given on 16 September. In the reply Lorraine defended the Catholic conception of the eucharist from the Protestant attacks, he argued that even the Orthodox church and Lutherans supported the Catholic position on this matter. De Bèze reacted scornfully to Lorraine's defence noting that Lorraine was speaking 'the old arguments, a thousand times refuted'. He also reacted with hostility to the proposals of Navarre that they invite the Lutherans to join the colloquy. Coligny confided despondently to Vermigli of his disappointment in the colloquy, informing the Florentine Protestant of his frustration that Catherine did not always listen to his proposals for the conduct of the sessions. During the session on 24 September, Lorraine presented the Württemberg confession to de Bèze (a similar confession to that of Augsburg) and asked him to sign it. De Bèze rejoindered by asking him to sign it first, something which earned Lorraine suspicious looks from the more conservative prelates. The general of the Jesuits Laynez had by now arrived, and was keen to ensure that the talks went no further. He announced that anyone who continued this 'Colloquy' with the Protestants would be excommunicated. He then informed Catherine that the Protestants were 'foxes, wolves and murderers' and that the only council that could look into matters of doctrine was the Council of Trent, not a national council. Tournon himself further sabotaged the continuity of the talks by insisting de Bèze subscribe to the points established so far by Lorraine, something that de Bèze could not agree to. After this debacle, and with Laynez present, Catherine decided to limit the attendees of future sessions to solely the delegates concerned with the discussions (twelve for each side), however it became clear in the acrimonious discussions that followed that no compromise could be reached that would unite the two creeds. A final attempt to save the conference with five representatives of each side meeting to discuss the eucharist also failed to close the divide. After a month the Colloquy ended on 18 October without any achievement. The Lutherans who had been invited to join the talks by Guise and Lorraine had not yet even arrived.

During the Colloquy, it was again reported to the Pope that cardinal de Châtillon had taken the eucharist in the Protestant manner with several other prelates (the bishop of Valence and the bishop of Uzès). These men, though members of the Catholic delegation at the colloquy refused to take communion from cardinal d'Armagnac or swear in favour of the real presence, as was demanded by the assembled clergy at large. They were not alone in refusing to swear the confession of faith, and were joined by the bishop of Chartres. The bishop of Troyes who was also present at the colloquy of Poissy, was the most openly Protestant of the prelates.

The failure of the colloquy damaged the credit of Lorraine with Catherine as she began to doubt his abilities. Having left the discussions before their conclusion, he resigned his office as chancellor of the ordre de Saint-Michel on 29 September. Tensions also grew inside the Lorraine family with the ultra-Catholic wing of the family desiring to end this period of compromise Lorraine was following. For Guise the colloquy was an unbearable experience as it afforded an opportunity for the presence of so many 'seditious heretics' at the court and Poissy. The duc observed that the colloquy did not quell the passions of the Protestants, who according to the letter he had from the vicomte de Joyeuse were in the process of seizing towns in Languedoc and suppressing the mass.

On 24 October Catherine appealed to the Pope for religious concessions, including an allowance for the laity to take communion in both kinds. These demands were poorly received by the Papacy. Meanwhile, domestically, the king issued a request to the bishops of the kingdom that for advent they chose moderate preachers who would not induce disorders through intolerant sermons.

By this time, Navarre was being courted by the Spanish, who offered him the kingdom of Sardinia in return for him pushing for the outlawing of Protestantism in France. In August he despatched his confident the rigidly Catholic comte d'Escars to Rome. Escars received the blessing of the Curia for Navarre's dealings with Philip. At this time d'Escars also became the lieutenant-general of the Limousin, appointed by the king in the hope he could revitalise connections between the crown and the nobility. While residing in Paris for a week in December, Navarre attended mass every day. His definitive break with Protestantism led to his denouncement by de Bèze as a new Julian the Apostate.

Catherine and the Protestants of the court plead with de Bèze to remain at court, while Calvin and the city government of Geneva requested his return. Condé and the queen of Navarre appealed to Geneva to grant him three months of leave. Not particularly interested in religion, Catherine saw de Bèze's importance in his ability to regulate and discipline the increasingly large Protestant community. At court de Bèze united the Crussol, Condé, Châtillon, and Albret families into a single church. The Protestants of court would consent to the issuing of a declaration on 21 October calling for the restoration of all Protestant seized churches to their original owner. Coligny and d'Andelot took up the royal declaration and advocated for it themselves. In return for this concession, de Bèze and Coligny were promised that they would be granted a place of assembly for every city, on condition the assembly did not exceed 500 in number. Nicoll argues that this was part of the same plan as that which ordered for the return of the Catholic churches. Lettres de cachet were issued to this effect on 3 November, while Catherine explored a more formal version of legal Protestantism. De Bèze expressed considerably concern that the impatience of his co-religionists would 'snatch this victory from them'.

=== Kidnap plot ===
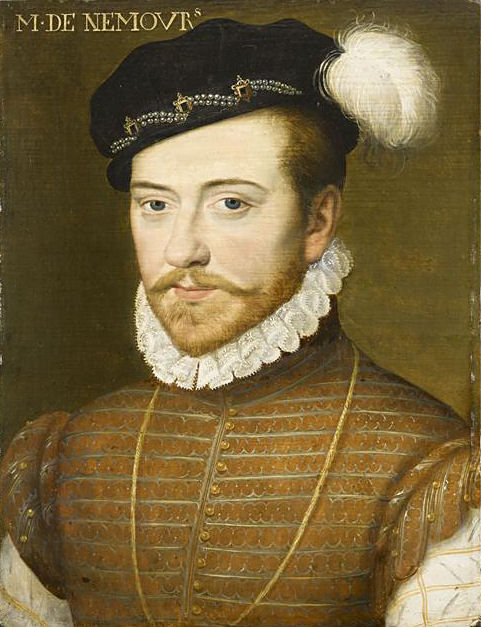
Duc de Nemours, future governor of the Lyonnais who attempted to kidnap the duc d'Orléans

Guise and his wife the duchesse de Guise, increasingly fearful of a Protestant coup, advised Catherine to send her younger children away from court. The duchesse proposed sending the duc d'Orléans (the future king Henri III) to be with his sister the duchesse de Lorraine and the duc d'Évreux (Catherine's third surviving son, future duc d'Alençon) to his aunt in Savoy, the duchess of Savoy. These urgings were built upon by the Spanish ambassador Chantonnay.

During October, a plot was uncovered by which the duc de Nemours attempted to kidnap the king's brother Orléans from the court, and take him to Lorraine or Savoie. From here he could take the head of a Catholic party. Nemours propositioned the young prince to this effect. After Nemours had convinced Orléans it was the turn of Orléans' friend the young prince de Joinville, son of the duc de Guise, who excitedly informed Orléans of how happy they would be in Lorraine. He explained the method by which he would be spirited from the court. The young Orléans confided the plot in a servant who promptly informed the queen. Upon discovering this plot Catherine was horrified and quickly moved to establish an official version in which Orléans had come to her after first hearing the seditious plot to confide it in her. In response to this attempted coup, the guard was doubled around the royal apartments and it is possible Orléans' windows were even bricked up.

On 9 October, Aumale departed court, he would be the first of a flood of Lorraine princes and allies to leave, closely followed by Lorraine and the bishop of Évreux. On 19 October, the duc de Guise, and all their other brothers along with the duc de Longueville, the duc de Nemours and 700 horsemen who composed their clientele departed from court in grand fashion, they were in turn followed two days later the constable de Montmorency who joined the exodus. The presence of Longueville, whose engagement with Guise's daughter had been broken off earlier that year, suggests to Carroll that Guise still supported Lorraine's policy. Alongside his disapproval at religious developments, Montmorency was angry at the rumours that Condé might usurp the office of constable from him. This was the first time all the Lorraine brothers had departed court at once. Their departure was a conscious expression of their disapproval of the crowns policy, and in Carroll's estimation despite losing access to the levers of political power, those who departed actually increased their informal power. By leaving the court, on the one hand they freed the crown to pursue toleration, but on the other they isolated the court and indicated to Catholics (both domestic and international - Philip II of Spain) that they supported the radicals in their disapproval of the policy. Guise retired to his lands in Champagne, and would spend the next several months there, Lorraine meanwhile went to his archbishopric of Reims. The absence of the grandees from court also raised the ominous spectre that they could take up arms, so that they could pressure the crown to abandon its policy of toleration. Only Tournon remained at court to defend the anti-toleration cause.

Catherine dispatched the comte de Crussol to inquire of Guise and Lorraine as to their involvement in the kidnap plot near the end of October. They denied being involved and suggested it was a Protestant libel. Crussol discussed Nemours plan with them being careful to avoid directly mention any details which might implicate the Lorraine family. They assured him that if Nemours was truly guilty he would have no greater enemy than them. Durot believes that while they may not have planned to kidnap the prince, it was advantageous to them to instil the desire in Orléans to flee the court, as a lever which could be used to pressure Catherine. On 29 October Orléans appeared before the king and testified to the nature of the conspiracy. He left out the involvement of the young prince de Joinville, focusing instead on Nemours, possibly at his mother's request. Catherine asked him why he had thought of leaving her, to which Orléans begged for her forgiveness, but stated he had never desired to leave her.

Nemours had by now secured himself in Savoie, despite Catherine's desire to see him brought to her dead or alive. He dispatched the sieur de Lignerolles to deny the charges against him. Lignerolles was thus arrested on 20 November. Lignerolles argued Nemours' words to Orléans had been little more than wishful thinking given the troubles in France, and that the proposed 'escape' was nonsensical. Catherine realised all she had against Nemours was the word of a ten year old and pursuit of the case was dropped. In January Lignerolles was released, and Nemours was cleared of the charge in May 1562. The secrétaire d'État Alluye wrote to encourage his return, informing him that his absence was regretted by the court. On 9 June 1562, Nemours was allowed to return to court, though Catherine would hold a grudge against the prince.

Catherine undertook appeals for Guise to return to court, which he politely declined in November, after which Catherine turned to working on his wife Anne. Guise took up correspondence with Montmorency and his wife, informing them that they should take great pride in their daughter Louise de Montmorency, who was a nun at the convent of Saint-Pierre de Reims. He also entered correspondence with several of the German Lutheran princes. The duke of Württemberg corresponded with Guise, Navarre and also acted as an intermediary between the French Protestants and crown.

=== Loss of momentum ===
The apogee of the Protestants had passed, and by December, both Condé and Coligny had departed court. This was not to say they had given up on government, and both continued to influence Catherine. Condé let it be known that he was travelling to Amiens to enforce the crown's orders against religious violence. Despite his Protestantism he urged them to also expel Protestant refugees. In early December, Montmorency and Saint-André returned to court. With Navarre now moving towards the Catholic camp, Catherine began to fear an intrigue to usurp her regency was in progress.

Some Catholic notables in Picardy were now greatly in opposition to Condé and wrote to Navarre and Montmorency asking them to protect the Catholic religion. Condé discovered this and wrote sharply to express his disapproval. He would not make it to Picardy before the start of the war.

The duc de Bouillon's proximity to Guise meant that despite his Protestantism, the prospect of relieving him of his governate of Normandy was considered, though not executed, in November. Without his traditional patron of Diane de Poitiers, Bouillon was reliant in this period on Guise's support to maintain him in the office.

In December the comte de Crussol was granted the honour of inducting the baron de Gordes and the comte de Sault into the ordre de Saint-Michel. Burie received a similar commission to induct the sieur de Soubise he noted in correspondence to the crown there might be complications in this process due to Soubise's Protestant inclinations.

==== Saint-Médard ====
On 26 December 1561 the religious tensions between Protestant and Catholics in Paris exploded in the Saint-Médard riot involving Protestants who had gathered with the intent of worshipping in a residence near the church of Saint-Médard. The Protestants had expressed their annoyance at the sounds of bell ringing for Catholic service, while the Catholics complained of the Protestant psalm singing. The former group, sent one of their number to complain to the Catholics, who did not immediately accede to the complaint and cease the bell ringing. More Protestant representatives were sent and a fight somehow began during which one of the Protestants was killed. In retribution for this Protestant rioters invaded the church attacking the worshippers inside. The church was attacked to purge it of idolatrous objects during its looting. The Catholic rioters would be ambushed by the royal authorities, and would spend the night in the prison of the petit-châtelet, among the arrested were priests. They were released after six days. No Protestants were arrested in the aftermath of the riot by contrast. In the popular imagination the incident was seen as a Protestant show of their power and control over the city. Even those Catholics inclined towards softer opinions on Protestantism were outraged. The lieutenant-criminel Desjardins who had undertaken the arrests was himself arrested. An investigation by the parlement of Paris in 1562 sentenced the chevalier du guet (knight of the watch) and their assistant to be hanged for their role in arresting the Catholic clergy. Desjardins by contrast avoided their fate through the protection of Catherine, and exhausted the parlement with a cascade of récusations against the various parlementaires involved in his trial.

At the beginning of 1562, with (largely unfounded) fears rising that a foreign intervention might soon be undertaken to force the crown to resume persecution, Coligny reached out to the Protestant churches of France, asking them to take stock of the military forces they could field if necessary. Indeed, Catherine had requested an estimation of the strength of the Protestant church in the final days of 1561, so that she might understand the support they could give to the crown. Coligny returned with a figure of 2,150 churches. The consistory of Le Mans promised that they would serve in war for the crown against any prince who tried to wage war against the king. By this request of Catherine, the Protestants of the kingdom came to see themselves more as the defenders of the crown, and more justified in military action if the government began to move towards the Catholic camp.

Catherine ignored the protests of the Spanish ambassador Chantonnay who accused Coligny of preparing an expedition of ships hostile to Spanish colonial holdings. It was alleged that Coligny sought to establish a Protestant colony inside territories claimed by Spain. Chantonnay set his king up in opposition to the Coligny brothers, telling Catherine she must choose one or the other. To this she demurred. Since 1561 Philip had been angling for the dismissal of Coligny, Condé and the other Protestants from the French court.

=== The Spanish threat ===
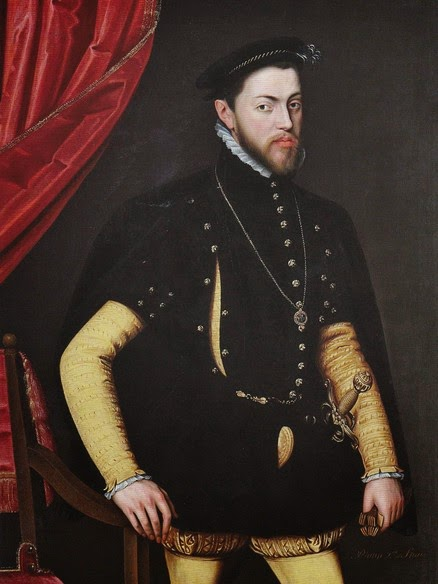
Philip II of Spain who pressured France against the toleration of Protestantism

Envoys from the papal curia attempted to convince Philip II of the wisdom of an intervention in France during October to 'deliver the kingdom from its calamities'. While the appeal was not made directly in the Pope's name, it was intimated that he was aware of and approved the enterprise. The king was urged to send his gendarmerie across the border from both the north and south. Emboldened by these actions, Philip's tone became increasingly stern, implying that if the French crown became Protestant he would declare war. On 17 October, Chantonnay, the Spanish ambassador conveyed that his king would offer troops to aid Catherine against the 'rebels', and if she refused, that they would be at the disposal of the Catholics of France. Catherine, furious, demanded an explanation from Madrid. The increasingly belligerent attitude of Spain towards France sparked the fear of the crown. Therefore, several steps were taken for the protection of France. The lieutenant-general of Languedoc, Joyeuse was warned to be prepared in case any enterprises were undertaken across the border. Calais and Metz both received reinforcements. The governor of the latter Vielleville was ordered not to permit the entry of Guise or his allies into the city, lest they hand it over to Philip. The governor of Calais, the seigneur de Gourdan was relieved of his charge in favour of the sieur de Gramont.

==== Pacification of the south-west ====
In response to the disorders that had consumed the south-west of France through the Autumn and Winter of 1561, and the relative timidity of the lieutenant-general of Guyenne (the seigneur de Burie) in confronting them, Monluc was given a commission to restore order through violent means. During February the sieur de Rouillac was besieged in his residence at Saint-Mézard after he had attempted to stop damage to the churches on his land. Monluc began his work at Saint-Mézard where on 20 February, he had a Protestant beheaded for the crime of insulting the king. Some peasants were hanged, and a deacon whipped. He replicated this brutal policy in Fumel, Villefranche-de-Rouergue and Monségur. He explained to the crown that it was only by harshness that pacification could come to pass, leniency would only bring further seditions.

== Toleration ==
Around 3 January 1562 L'Hôpital first spoke in favour of an (at least temporary) toleration of a diversity of religion in the kingdom. He subordinated the matter of religion to the stability of the republic, going so far as to declare that someone who was not a Christian could be a citizen of the kingdom. Turchetti identifies this moment with the fracturing of the 'middle party' into those who could subordinate religious matters to civic ones on a temporary or permanent basis and tolerate the diversity of religion; and those of the more traditional moyenneur party who wished to find a confessional compromise by which the church could be reunited.

=== Edict of Saint-Germain ===
Catherine decided a new edict was needed to resolve the religious disorders. To this end she had the principal magistrates of the parlements and members of the royal council assemble at Saint-Germain to deliberate on the best means of pacifying the kingdom. Orders were sent out to this effect at the end of October. Those chevaliers de l'Ordre de Saint-Michel who were present in Paris were also invited to participate. This endeavour had the support of Navarre, Condé, Coligny and one of the sons of Montmorency. The delegates were carefully selected by Catherine for their largely moderate dispositions, so that they might come to the agreement that she hoped. This was to avoid a repeat of the talks that had preceded the edict of July. Therefore, the parlementaire présidents Christophe de Harley and René Baillet and conseillers Paul de Foix and Arnaud de Ferrier of the moderate faction of the Paris parlement participated. Grandees would also participate, among them Saint-André, marshal Montmorency and the cardinal de Tournon. Tournon estimated that there were '12 good Catholics' among those present for the discussions. Chancellor L'Hôpital led the discussions. He announced that repression had failed, but that they had not been called together by the king to determine whether Protestantism or Catholicism was the superior creed, but to sooth the troubles. For L'Hôpital unity of faith in the kingdom remained the ideal, but this had to be subordinated to the political needs of the moment. Debate followed from 7 to 15 January, and was bitterly argued by those present. Of the 49 assembled grandees, the proposal to grant Protestants churches failed by 29–22, however there was a majority in favour of granting the rights of Protestants to assemble and worship freely. Only 10 of the assembled delegates were opposed to any toleration. At the conclusion of the discussion Catherine re-assured the delegates that she and her children would remain Catholic and in obedience to the Roman church. She further stated that this toleration was only to avoid continued bloodshed and disorder in the kingdom. Religious affairs would be properly solved at such time as a full church council could be held. Her speech was hailed by the Papal Nuncio who was present.

As a result of these discussions the Edict of Saint-Germain, or Edict of January was issued on 17 January, by which Protestantism was legalised outside of cities, until such time a General Council of the church could be held. The Protestants were not to meet at night. Pastors of the Protestant church had to swear to abide by the terms of the edict. Synods were prohibited except for in circumstances in which they were officially authorised. Protestants were to return Catholic property they had seized, and were forbidden from making attacks on Catholic worship on pain of death. Protestant sermons could also not denounce Catholic mass. Officers of the crown were to be afforded access to Protestant services whenever they requested it, Protestants could not impose taxation and had to maintain the "political laws of the Roman church", by which is meant the administrative aspects of Catholic public life. Though Protestantism was now legally to be 'tolerated' this did not hold the modern connotations of the word, but rather that Protestantism was something that must be suffered and endured to avoid the greater evil of civil disorder. As with the 1560 Edict of Amboise, the fact that it was the beginning of the young king's reign was utilised as justification, as it was stated that Charles did not wish to begin his reign with bloody repression.

On 24 January Navarre and marshal Montmorency were dispatched to the parlement of Paris to demand the body begin deliberating the edict. The Marshal and Navarre demanded the edicts immediate registration, however the court was unmoved by this bluff, and instead demanded they be provided copies so they could begin to review the edict. That same day, a delegation from the Sorbonne, the chancelier of the church of Paris, and the men of the hôtel de ville came to implore the parlement not to register the edict. The parlement had 1,200 copies of the edict that had been printed by marshal Montmorency at Catherine's request seized on 27 January. The parlement was greatly annoyed the edict had been printed and distributed before the body had looked it over. On 30 January the sieur de Thieux was dispatched to hurry the parlement causing the body to react with irritation. The parlement refused to register the edict and remonstrated with the crown on 12 February, coming to Saint-Germain. They highlighted that when crowned, the king had sworn to banish heresy from the kingdom, and that no religiously divided kingdom could survive. Far from restoring order in the kingdom, it would be condemned to chaotic seditions by the edict. The parlement implied the edict was possibly illegal, due to the minority of the king and Catherine being a woman. The parlementaires were dressed down when they presented their remonstrance, L'Hôpital argued it proved they did not understand the situation like the queen and her council did. Catherine further retorted to the parlementaires that there were so many abuses in the church, that it was natural to desire its reformation. She further informed them that she above all others despised the harsh methods of the past. By this edict things could be calmed until a council could resolve the religious question. De Thou returned to the parlement with an assurance that the king would remain in the Catholic faith, and that Protestant services would be open to officers of the law to ensure they were not seditious. It was affirmed that officers of justice would be expected to remain Catholic and that their involvement with Protestant services was not to participate but to ensure they remained non seditious. This satisfied him that the edict could be registered. He brought along with him in his backing of the edict the moderate wing of the parlement.

Unrest grew in Paris as a result of the delay in registering the edict, with a band of around 400 armed Protestant students walking the streets to the courthouse. Letters patent were issued on 14 February to compel the parlement to register the edict in which the king stated he never intended to approve of two religions in the kingdom and the edict was a provisional measure. As such tolerance was a civic matter not a religious one. Nevertheless, on 18 February, the body again rejected the edict. On 3 March La Roche-sur-Yon was sent to apply further pressure on the body, and he succeeded in overcoming their objections, highlighting that Charles would remain Catholic and the alternative was disorder. La Roche-sur-Yon pointed to the various disorders in the capital, and the rumours of armed groups approaching the city. Marshal de Montmorency confirmed the princes report, informing the court that there were around 5–6,000 armed men approaching the capital. While the final deliberations were taking place, a large band of students rioted in the courtyard of the Palais de Justice itself shouting that if they were not given temples they would seize them. On 5 March the Parlement relented and registered the edict. The parlement noted their registration came without 'approval of the new religion' and until such time as a new edict was issued. Their approval was further disavowed in the parlements secret register. No sooner was the edict published than Catherine and the court departed to Montceaux-en-Brie, in Romier's opinion to avoid being subject to the Catholic reaction to the edict. Tournon was tearful as she departed, recommending to her she return to the Catholic religion. This registration came after the Massacre of Wassy had already sabotaged the edict. Meanwhile, the Spanish ambassador Chantonnay offered to lend his support in ridding her of her 'mendacious' Protestant advisers. The Pope advised the king to spare 'neither fire nor iron' in the reunification of the French church.

To enforce the edict, around 12 commissioners were despatched by the crown.

==== Protestant reaction ====
The Protestant reception of the edict was largely positive, though they had little intention of returning the churches they had seized in the Midi to their former Catholic occupants. The edict was after all just a stepping stone on the way to the full conversion of the kingdom to Protestantism, or so de Bèze believed. Venard characterises this as a delusion, highlighting the distance between the king and the Protestants in the edict. De Bèze opined that the edict was written in 'harsh terms' and had some unfair additions the Catholic ultras hoped would induce the Protestants to violent action, but that the Protestants would be content to look to god for the arrangement they desired. The Protestants assembled at Saint-Germain wrote out to the provinces urging them to move quickly to see the edict adhered to, so that the crown could see what obedient subjects they were. It was a relief for many Protestants that their loyalty to god and their loyalty to the king were now no longer to be in conflict with one another.

In Paris sermons were held by the terms of the edict in the faubourgs Saint-Antoine, Saint-Marcel and Saint-Jacques.

==== New colloquy ====
From 28 January to 11 February Catherine hosted a second colloquy. The topics of discussion were the place of images in religious observances and the rite of baptism. However these talks proved no more fruitful than those of Poissy the year previous. Navarre and the prelates who were present now showed total intransigence towards compromise, looking instead to the council of Trent. It was only on the matter of the cult of the Saints that some Catholic prelates expressed reservations, but even here they would not consent to its abolition. Many of the attendees were the same as those who had attended Poissy: de Bèze, Coligny, Monluc, d'Espence, the abbot of Salignac and Boutellier.

Until the end of January, Catherine remained committed to the course of tolerance. Andelot was introduced into the royal council and the queen had Charles' more rigidly Catholic governor replaced with the prince de La Roche-sur-Yon, whose health led to fears that the king would in fact be governed by Coligny.

=== Pushback ===
==== Catholic ====
Many Catholics felt betrayed by the policy of their king and his government. The desecration of the articles of their faith by the iconoclasts was something they felt need to be combatted, not tolerated in an official edict. Calvin was the anti-Christ by this reckoning, and these fears were fanned by itinerant preachers who spoke of the calamities that would befall France if heresy was not eradicated. Therefore, there now appeared to be a contradiction between the obedience they owed the king and the obedience they owed god.

Even moderate Catholics had a difficult time accepting the edict. The edict came as a great blow to the moyenneurs who had looked to Poissy for its possibility of broaching a confessional compromise by which the Protestants and Catholics could be reunited under one roof. Of the Catholic princes, only the prince de La Roche-sur-Yon supported the edict. The crown had failed to find a formula to achieve broader support from the moyenneur faction. To these people it was an abomination that the kingdom was now composed of two diverse creeds which would be opposed to one another. The inevitable result would be conflict between Protestant and Catholic which would undermine the authority of the king. For Lorraine, while he had been keen to see dogmatic reconciliation with the Protestants, the granting of toleration was to be opposed as it marked a failure of the policy of reunification. Moreover, in his estimation, the edict overstepped the bounds of what was proper for the monarchy in regards to the French church. For some moyenneurs the edict was salvaged by the fact it was a temporary provisional measure, and would not lead to the permanent approval of diversity of religion.

L'Hôpital, by contrast, saw toleration as an act of patience for the errors of others, which could only be rectified by god.

In pamphlets Catherine was decried as a new Jezebel, introducing false religion into the realm, while L'Hôpital was suspected of being a crypto-Protestant. While both L'Hôpital's wife and daughter were Protestant, the chancellor himself would remain Catholic throughout his life.

In the south, the seigneur de Nègrepelisse at the head of around four thousand gentleman of the Quercy, Périgord, Agenais, Armagnac, Rouergue and Comminges regions approached the sieur de Burie (lieutenant-general of Guyenne) and Monluc to propose that their services be employed against the Protestants.

==== Sorbonne ====
The Edict of Saint-Germain was the final straw for many of the Catholic princes. It was also abhorrent to many other Catholics. The Sorbonne and clergy of Paris urged the Parlements to reject registration of the edict. The crown lacked the authority to impose the edict, which was seen by many as a violation of their consciences. Instead of soothing religious discord it would be inflamed.

==== Paris ====
The city council and clergy of Paris protested against the new edict strongly. A manifesto called for the renouncing of tolerance and the extirpation of heresy. A delegation of Parisian merchants also lodged their own protest with the king at Saint-Germain. Catherine explained to the prévôt des marchands (provost of the merchants) that she had not allowed Protestants to meet in Paris and that they would be outside of the city.

==== Dijon ====
In Dijon the lieutenant-general of the province, Tavannes, and the mayor and city council were aghast when they learned of the new edict. They, along with the parlement of Dijon, refused to recognise the edict. Further they despatched a delegation to the court of the mayor and several échevins (alderman) to explain that Dijon's situation made it unsuitable for such an edict. The city was a 'frontier fortification' and the permission for assemblies would only bring about seditions. The massacre of Wassy and its aftermath would enable Tavannes and Dijon to continue their efforts to suppress Protestantism in Burgundy. After six months, the parlement was granted permission to not register the edict.

==== Toulouse ====
The capitouls of the city of Toulouse informed Catherine that the Catholics of their city would not hesitate to employ violence to oppose toleration. The Protestants soon began the construction of a church outside the walls of the city from a covered barn.

==== Bordeaux ====
In Bordeaux, the seigneur de Monluc argued that as a frontier town, Bordeaux was exempt by the terms of the edict from having to site Protestant churches outside its walls.

The lieutenant-general of Guyenne Burie and premier président of the Bordeaux parlement Lagebâton were meanwhile planning their attack on the Catholic syndicate of the Bordeaux parlement. Lagebâton ordered an investigation into the organisation that was to be dispatched to the conseil privé, meanwhile Burie discovered the syndicates establishment had not been registered by the parlement and therefore it was an illegal assembly by the terms of the Edict of Saint-Germain. On 12 April the conseil privé declared that the syndicate must cease operation and all its declarations were null.

==== Parlements ====
The parlement of Rouen proved to be the most pliant to the edict, and registered it first. This was due to the weakness of the ultra-Catholic faction in the court at this time.

The parlement of Toulouse secured from the crown the prohibition of Protestantism in towns that had not enjoyed Protestant worship before the publishing of the edict, in addition to a further four towns which were presently enjoying Protestant worship (Carcassonne, Narbonne, Leucate and Agde). When registering it they added the proviso that 'in case of necessity or abuse, it would administer the edict itself'.

The parlements of Aix and Grenoble also refused to register the edict. In the parlement of Aix, there were seven judges who defied their colleagues to support registration. The comte de Crussol forced through the adoption of the edict in Provence.

==== Catherine's retreat ====
As a result of this pushback Catherine began to retreat. On 4 February she attended high mass and participated in a religious procession. She ordered the woman of her suite to demonstrate their Catholicity (and not talk of Protestantism), while her second son the duc d'Orléans was ordered to attend Catholic services. The young king's new liberal tutors were replaced with those of more firmly orthodox disposition. The queen of Navarre's preacher was expelled from court and Protestant preaching was prohibited at the court. A new interpretative declaration was issued concerning the Edict of Saint-Germain on 14 February by which it was declared that the edict should not be taken as an approval of the diversity of religion in the kingdom. As a final concession French delegates were finally dispatched by Catherine to attend the Council of Trent. Catherine did however instruct them to do their best to obstruct the dogmatism of the other delegates in favour of her more tolerant policies.

The queen of Navarre, who now found herself in opposition to her husband was to be dismissed from court after she refused to attend the baptism of the Spanish ambassador's son. The Spanish ambassador threatened to depart himself if it were not done. The king of Navarre had already been campaigning for her to cease her public Protestantism since November, and had begun to consider repudiating her as his wife. He was encouraged in this course by the comte d'Escars and bishop of Auxerre. Navarre made considerations towards a new marriage with Marie Stuart, widow of the late king François II, however nothing came of this. By early 1562, their marriage was destroyed beyond the possibility of repair.

=== Württemberg ===
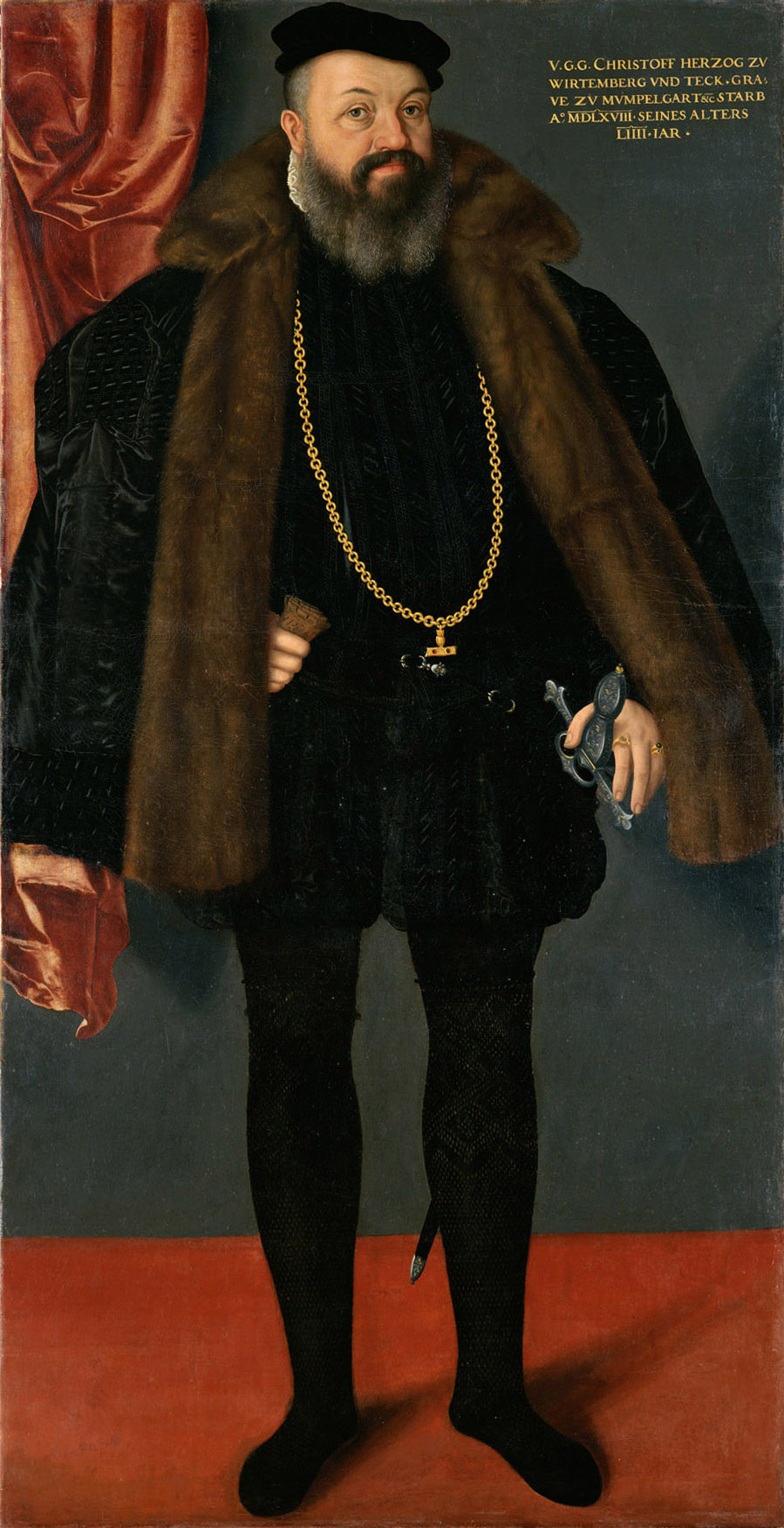
duke of Württemberg who met with the cardinal de Lorraine and duc de Guise at Saverne in February 1562

Guise and his brother Lorraine retired themselves to their estates and refused to come to court. While absent from the centre of power Lorraine preached in Reims, delivering a sermon that was viewed by a contemporary as borderline Lutheran in tone. On 31 January they wrote to Catherine to defend their conduct, denying that they were involved in a planned enterprise to deliver the city of Metz to the duc de Lorraine. However the letter was not entirely conciliatory, and implied that they saw importance in protecting their own interests alongside those of the French crown. They informed Catherine they were seeking a marriage between the Austrian Archduke and their niece Marie Stuart.

Upon invitation, Lorraine and Guise travelled (alongside their brothers the cardinal de Guise and the grand prieur, and Guise's son the prince de Joinville) in February to meet with the duke of Württemberg and some Lutheran theologians at Saverne. The duc de Guise had first made contact with Württemberg in July 1561, expressing interest in the confession of Augsburg to the prince and contrasting it with the Calvinist position on the Eucharist. The meeting itself was arranged in December, with the start delayed by Guise's insistence the author of the Württemberg confession be present. The meeting lasted from 15 to 18 February, in the lands of the bishop of Strasbourg. At the meeting it appeared some form of doctrinal agreement was arrived at, in the meanwhile, Guise promised he would not persecute Protestantism. Guise expressed his interest in becoming Lutheran if Lutheranism indeed corresponded with the description Württemberg provided for the faith. During a meeting with the Protestants, Lorraine argued the Catholic faith went too far with how it treated the host, and that mass was an act of commemoration of Christ's sacrifice as opposed to a sacrifice in itself. He further stated that he would gladly trade his red robes for black ones. During their stay, Lorraine continued preaching and made several highly conciliatory sermons in which he endorsed an abandonment of salvation through the saints, salvation through good works and made concessions on the mass towards the Lutheran position. At a more strategic level, Guise and his brother promised to allow the Augsburg confession to be promulgated in France, in return they gained the promise of the powerful duke that the princes of the Empire would remain neutral in the scenario of a civil war with the Condé. On Calvinism the two sides diverged, with the Lorraine princes seeing the faith as something that is beyond salvaging. For the Lutherans, Calvinists were brothers who had fallen into error.

Several hypotheses exist concerning this meeting, on the one hand that it was a Machiavellian endeavour by the Guise to divide their religious enemies from one another, in another understanding that they were willing to sacrifice the Catholic cause to secure their political strength, finally that they saw in Lutheranism a 'third way' that could secure religious peace in France. Jouanna distinguishes the motivations of Lorraine and Guise for the meeting, arguing the former had a more genuine interest in seeing a religious reunification on Lutheran lines while the latter wished for the neutrality of the German princes in the scenario of a civil war. Durot states that Guise would not have repeated what he stated to 'his friend' Württemberg back in France. He further argues a key purpose of the meeting was to highlight to Württemberg the gulf that existed between Lutheranism and Calvinism ('a sect of rebels that threatens the social order'). Neither Guise nor Lorraine intended to abide by their words to Württemberg to leave the Calvinists in peace. Carroll argues that the meeting was conducted in good faith, but Lorraine and Guise had no intention of becoming Lutherans, rather they hoped for a blending of Lutheranism and Catholicism into a single faith.

=== Navarre defects ===
Navarre, the lieutenant-general of the kingdom was one of the edict of Saint-Germain's most firm opponents. He began to advocate for the return of persecutory measures against Protestantism. He praised the Spanish inquisition and described the creators of the edict of Saint-Germain as 'evil doers'. He made his definitive break with the regency government of which he was a chief component. On 25 January he and Montmorency came before Catherine and the prince accused her of having violated the agreement between the two of them. Navarre alleged Catherine had opened dispatches and responded to them without his cognisance and she only looked to the opinion of the Châtillon brothers. He was horrified by the introduction of Andelot into the conseil des affaires. Catherine argued against this, but Navarre became angry. She said of Montmorency that he could depart court if he desired. Montmorency departed the next day without taking leave of the king. Navarre's defection was a great blow to the regency government, Navarre was not only the head of the royal army but also the premier prince du sang, he thus grants great legitimacy to the 'Triumvirates' cause. He was even able to bring some nobles who were understood to be Protestant with him in his new policy. Back in January, the seigneur d'Auzance had succeeded in securing for him a promise from the Spanish king that in return for the destruction of Protestantism in France, Philip would seek to compensate Navarre for the loss of his kingdom, Navarre was jubilant upon Auzance return to court. De Bèze reacted to his defection with fury, decrying him as a lost wretch. Navarre affiliated himself with the 'Catholic Triumvirate' of Guise, Montmorency and Saint-André. Catherine, under pressure from the Spanish prohibited Protestant worship at court.

Navarre again makes a great scene at council on 12 February, arguing that the Châtillon brothers be sent out to their provinces for the execution of the edict. Catherine countered that if they needed to depart court for such purposes, so too did Navarre and the Catholic grandees. Navarre disagreed saying they were needed to work in royal council. Catherine highlighted so too were the Protestants of court. The Spanish ambassador Chantonnay presented her an ultimatum, send the Châtillon from court or break with Spain. Coligny and his two brothers (d'Andelot and Châtillon) seeing which way the wind was blowing, departed from court in two stages, Coligny and d'Andelot on 17 February, then cardinal de Châtillon a few days later. Coligny retired to his estates, while Andelot went to conduct an inspection of the French infantry. Catherine was greatly angered by their departure according to Tournon. Coligny's departure disheartened his co-religionists and offered the anti-toleration Catholics proof of their strength. Protestants began to lose faith in legal means of influencing the government. Catherine in revenge for the loss of the Châtillon brothers moved to disgrace Saint-André at this time, ordering him to return to his governate. Navarre was incensed by the disgrace of Saint-André and tightened his affiliation with the Catholic party. He rebuked Catherine for seeking to disgrace 'good and valiant captains' while aligning herself with those who are worth less than a 'servants servant'. When Condé protested, Navarre ordered him silent. Catherine, furious, stuck to her demands, and Saint-André departed court. She further demanded the departure of cardinal de Tournon, the man who had negotiated her marriage and who she considered her oldest friend. Tournon was however too sick to comply with the demand so retired to his home at the court. Catherine was left isolated at court.

Navarre requested of Catherine that she call out to Guise for his return to court, meanwhile Guise made his way back into France from Württemberg travelling to Joinville. Residing at Joinville, Guise was summoned to the capital by Navarre and thus began a progress. Guise intended to see to the abolition of the edict of Saint-Germain upon his arrival. Catherine recognising the court would become fundamentally unbalanced in favour of militant Catholics by his arrival.

=== Wassy and war ===
On Guise's path to return to the French court, he passed through the town of Wassy. While in the town his troops committed a massacre of the towns Protestant population. Outraged, the Protestants at court first protested to Catherine and then moved into rebellion. On 2 April Condé led an army into Orléans and soon thereafter published a manifesto of his rebellion. This began the first French War of Religion.

== Sources ==
- Babelon, Jean-Pierre (2009). Henri IV. Fayard.
- Baumgartner, Frederic (1986). Change and Continuity in the French Episcopate: The Bishops and the Wars of Religion 1547-1610.
- Benedict, Philip (1999). "The Dynamics of Protestant Militancy: France 1555-1563". In Benedict, Philip; Marnef, Guido; Nierop, Henk van; Venard, Marc (eds.). Reformation, Revolt and Civil War in France and the Netherlands 1555-1585. Royal Netherlands Academy of Arts and Sciences.
- Benedict, Philip (2003). Rouen during the Wars of Religion. Cambridge University Press.
- Benedict, Philip (2012). "Prophets in Arms? Ministers in War, Minsters on War: France 1562-1574". In Murdock, Graeme; Roberts, Penny; Spicer, Andrew (eds.). Ritual and Violence: Natalie Zemon Davis and Early Modern France. Oxford University Press.
- Benedict, Philip (2020). Season of Conspiracy: Calvin, the French Reformed Churches, and Protestant Plotting in the Reign of Francis II (1559-1560). American Philosophical Society Press.
- Bernstein, Hilary (2004). Between Crown and Community: Politics and Civic Culture in Sixteenth-Century Poitiers. Cornell University Press.
- Bourquin, Laurent (1994). Noblesse Seconde et Pouvoir en Champagne aux XVIe et XVIIe Siècles. Éditions de la Sorbonne.
- Carroll, Stuart (2003). "The Compromise of Charles, Cardinal de Lorraine: New Evidence". Journal of Ecclesiastical History. 54 3.
- Carroll, Stuart (2005). Noble Power during the French Wars of Religion: The Guise Affinity and Catholic Cause in Normandy. Cambridge University Press.
- Carroll, Stuart (2006). Blood and Violence in Early Modern France. Oxford University Press.
- Carroll, Stuart (2011). Martyrs and Murderers: The Guise Family and the Making of Europe. Oxford University Press.
- Carroll, Stuart (2012). "The Rights of Violence". In Murdock, Graeme; Roberts, Penny; Spicer, Andrew (eds.). Ritual and Violence: Natalie Zemon Davis and Early Modern France. Oxford University Press.
- Carroll, Stuart (2013). "'Nager entre deux eaux': The Princes and the Ambiguities of French Protestantism". Sixteenth Century Journal. 44 4.
- Carpi, Olivia (2012). Les Guerres de Religion (1559-1598): Un Conflit Franco-Français. Ellipses.
- Carpi, Olivia (2005). Une République Imaginaire: Amiens pendant les Troubles de Religion (1559-1597). Belin.
- Chevallier, Pierre (1985). Henri III: Roi Shakespearien. Fayard.
- Christin, Olivier (1997). La Paix de Religion: L'Autonomisation de la Raison Poliitique au XVIe Siècle. Seuil.
- Christin, Olivier (1999). "From Repression to Pacification: French Royal Policy in the Face of Protestantism". In Benedict, Philip; Marnef, Guido; Nierop, Henk van; Venard, Marc (eds.). Reformation, Revolt and Civil War in France and the Netherlands 1555-1585. Royal Netherlands Academy of Arts and Sciences.
- Cloulas, Ivan (1979). Catherine de Médicis. Fayard.
- Constant, Jean-Marie (1984). Les Guise. Hachette.
- Constant, Jean-Marie (1996). La Ligue. Fayard.
- Constant, Jean-Marie (1999). "The Protestant Nobility in France during the Wars of Religion: A Leaven of Innovation in a Traditional World". In Benedict, Philip; Marnef, Guido; Nierop, Henk van; Venard, Marc (eds.). Reformation, Revolt and Civil War in France and the Netherlands 1555-1585. Royal Netherlands Academy of Arts and Sciences.
- Crété, Liliane (1985). Coligny. Fayard.
- Crouzet, Denis (1998). La Sagesse et le Malheur: Michel de L'Hospital, Chancelier de France. Champ Vallon.
- Crouzet, Denis (1999). "Calvinism and the Users of the Political and the Religious (France, ca. 1560-ca. 1572)". In Benedict, Philip; Marnef, Guido; Nierop, Henk van; Venard, Marc (eds.). Reformation, Revolt and Civil War in France and the Netherlands 1555-1585. Royal Netherlands Academy of Arts and Sciences.
- Dauvin, Antoine (2021). Un Mythe de Concorde Urbaine?: le Corps de Ville de Caen, le Gouverneur et le Roi durant les Guerres de Religion (1557-1594). Normandie Université.
- Davies, Joan (1979). "Persecution and Protestantism: Toulouse 1562-1575". The Historical Journal. 22 1.
- Diefendorf, Barbara (1991). Beneath the Cross: Catholics and Huguenots in Sixteenth Century Paris. Oxford University Press.
- Durot, Éric (2012). François de Lorraine, Duc de Guise entre Dieu et le Roi. Classiques Garnier.
- Foa, Jérémie (2004). "Making Peace: The Commissioners for Enforcing the Pacification Edicts in the Reign of Charles IX (1560-1574)". French History. 18 3.
- Garrisson-Estèbe, Janine (1980). Protestants du Midi 1559-1598. Privat.
- Garrisson, Janine (1991). Guerre Civile et Compromis 1559-1598. Éditions du Seuil.
- Gould, Kevin (2016). Catholic Activism in South-West France 1540-1570. Routledge.
- Greengrass, Mark (1983). "The Anatomy of a Religious Riot in Toulouse in May 1562". Journal of Ecclesiastical History. 34 3.
- Greengrass, Mark (1999). "Financing the Cause: Protestant Mobilization and Accountability in France (1562-1598)". In Benedict, Philip; Marnef, Guido; Nierop, Henk van; Venard, Marc (eds.). Reformation, Revolt and Civil War in France and the Netherlands 1555-1585. Royal Netherlands Academy of Arts and Sciences.
- Harding, Robert (1978). Anatomy of a Power Elite: the Provincial Governors in Early Modern France. Yale University Press.
- Heller, Henry (1991). Iron and Blood: Civil War in Sixteenth-Century France. McGill-Queen's University Press.
- Holt, Mack P. (2005). The French Wars of Religion, 1562-1629. Cambridge University Press.
- Holt, Mack (2012). "Religious Violence in Sixteenth-Century France: Moving Beyond Pollution and Purifucation". In Murdock, Graeme; Roberts, Penny; Spicer, Andrew (eds.). Ritual and Violence: Natalie Zemon Davis and Early Modern France. Oxford University Press.
- Holt, Mack (2020). The Politics of Wine in Early Modern France: Religion and Popular Culture in Burgundy 1477-1630. Cambridge University Press.
- Jouanna, Arlette (1989). Le Devoir de révolte: La noblesse française et la gestation de l'Etat moderne 1559-1661. Fayard.
- Jouanna, Arlette (1998). "Le Temps des Guerres de Religion en France (1559-1598)". In Jouanna, Arlette; Boucher, Jacqueline; Biloghi, Dominique; Le Thiec, Guy (eds.). Histoire et Dictionnaire des Guerres de Religion.
- Jouanna, Arlette (2021). La France du XVIe Siècle 1483-1598. Presses Universitaires de France.
- Kingdon, Robert M. (2007). Geneva and the Coming of the Wars of Religion In France 1555-1563. Librairie Droz.
- Knecht, Robert (1996). The Rise and Fall of Renaissance France. Fontana Press.
- Knecht, Robert (2008). The French Renaissance Court. Yale University Press.
- Knecht, Robert (2010). The French Wars of Religion, 1559-1598. Routledge.
- Knecht, Robert (2014). Catherine de' Medici. Routledge.
- Knecht, Robert (2016). Hero or Tyrant? Henry III, King of France, 1574-1589. Routledge.
- Konnert, Mark (1997). Civic Agendas & Religious Passion: Châlon-sur-Marne during the French Wars of Religion 1560-1594. Sixteenth Century Journal Publishers Inc.
- Konnert, Mark (2006). Local Politics in the French Wars of Religion: The Towns of Champagne, the Duc de Guise and the Catholic League 1560-1595. Ashgate.
- Mariéjol, Jean H. (1983). La Réforme, la Ligue, l'Édit de Nantes. Tallandier.
- Miquel, Pierre (1980). Les Guerres de Religion. Fayard.
- Nicoll, David (2020). Noble Identity during the French Wars of Religion: Antoine de Crussol, the duc d'Uzès. University of Warwick.
- Nicholls, David (1994). "Protestants Catholics and Magistrates in Tours 1562-1572: The Making of a Catholic City during the Religious Wars". French History. 8 1.
- Pernot, Michel (1987). Les Guerres de Religion en France 1559-1598. Sedes.
- Pitts, Vincent (2012). Henri IV of France: His Reign and Age. Johns Hopkins University Press.
- Potter, David (1993). War and Government in the French Provinces: Picardy 1470-1560. Cambridge University Press.
- Potter, David (1997). The French Wars of Religion: Selected Documents. Palgrave Macmillan.
- Potter, David (2001). "The French Protestant Nobility in 1562: The 'Associacion de Monseigneur le Prince de Condé'". French History. 15 3.
- Rivault, Antoine (2023). Le Duc d'Étampes et la Bretagne: Le Métier de gouverneur de Province à la Renaissance (1543-1565). Presses Universitaires de Rennes.
- Robbins, Kevin (1997). City on the Ocean Sea: La Rochelle, 1530-1650 Urban Society, Religion and Politics on the French Atlantic Frontier. Brill.
- Roberts, Penny (1996). A City in Conflict: Troyes during the French Wars of Religion. Manchester University Press.
- Roberts, Penny (2012). "Peace, Ritual and Sexual Violence during the Religious Wars". In Murdock, Graeme; Roberts, Penny; Spicer, Andrew (eds.). Ritual and Violence: Natalie Zemon Davis and Early Modern France. Oxford University Press.
- Roberts, Penny (2013). Peace and Authority during the French Religious Wars c.1560-1600. Palgrave Macmillan.
- Roelker, Nancy (1968). Queen of Navarre: Jeanne d'Albret 1528-1572. Harvard University Press.
- Roelker, Nancy (1996). One King, One Faith: The Parlement of Paris and the Religious Reformation of the Sixteenth Century. University of California Press.
- Romier, Lucien (1923). La Conjuration d'Amboise: L'Aurore Sanglante de la Liberté de Conscience, Le Règne et la mort de François II. Perrin et Cie.
- Romier, Lucien (1924). Catholiques et Huguenots à la cour de Charles IX. Perrin et Cie.
- Le Roux, Nicolas (2022). 1559-1629 Les Guerres de Religion. Gallimard.
- Salmon, J.H.M. (1979). Society in Crisis: France in the Sixteenth Century. Metheun & Co.
- Solnon, Jean-François (2001). Henri III: un désir de majesté. Librarie Académique Perrin.
- Souriac, Pierre-Jean (2008). Une Guerre Civile: Affrontements Religieux et Militaires dans Le Midi Toulousain (1562-1596). Champ Vallon.
- Sutherland, Nicola (1962). The French Secretaries of State in the Age of Catherine de Medici. The Athlone Press.
- Sutherland, Nicola (1980). The Huguenot Struggle for Recognition. Yale University Press.
- Sutherland, Nicola (1981). "The Assassination of François Duc de Guise, February 1563". The Historical Journal. 24 2.
- Tingle, Elizabeth C. (2006). Authority and Society in Nantes during the French Wars of Religion, 1559-1598. Manchester University Press.
- Thompson, James (1909). The Wars of Religion in France 1559-1576: The Huguenots, Catherine de Medici and Philip II. Chicago University Press.
- Tulchin, Allan (2010). That Men Would Praise the Lord: The Triumph of Protestantism in Nîmes 1530-1570. Oxford University Press.
- Turchetti, Mario (1999). "Middle Partis in France during the Wars of Religion". In Benedict, Philip; Marnef, Guido; Nierop, Henk van; Venard, Marc (eds.). Reformation, Revolt and Civil War in France and the Netherlands 1555-1585. Royal Netherlands Academy of Arts and Sciences.
- Tulchin, Allan (2012). "Massacres during the French Wars of Religion". In Murdock, Graeme; Roberts, Penny; Spicer, Andrew (eds.). Ritual and Violence: Natalie Zemon Davis and Early Modern France. Oxford University Press.
- Venard, Marc (1999). "Catholicism and Resistance to the Reformation in France, 1555-1585". In Benedict, Philip; Marnef, Guido; Nierop, Henk van; Venard, Marc (eds.). Reformation, Revolt and Civil War in France and the Netherlands 1555-1585. Royal Netherlands Academy of Arts and Sciences.
- Vray, Nicole (1997). La Guerre des Religions dans la France de l'Ouest: Poitou-Aunis-Saintonge 1534-1610. Geste Éditions.
- Wood, James (2002). The Kings Army: Warfare, Soldiers and Society during the Wars of Religion in France, 1562-1576. Cambridge University Press.
