= Ottoman wintering in Toulon =

Cession of the French port of Toulon to an Ottoman fleet in 1543–44

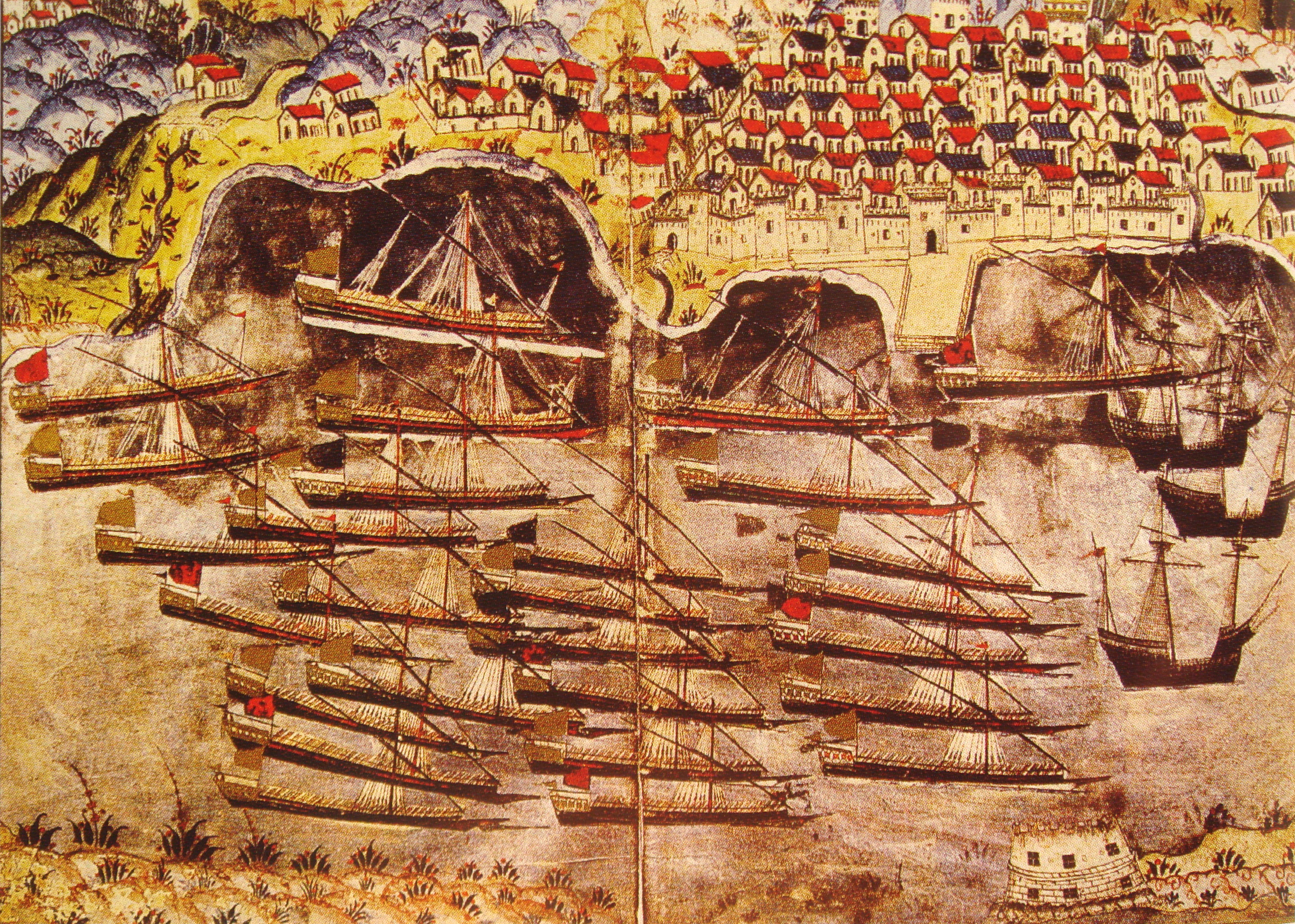
The fleet wintering at the harbour of Toulon, France, 1543, with the recently built Tour Royale (bottom right).

The Ottoman wintering in Toulon occurred during the winter of 1543–44, following the Franco-Ottoman Siege of Nice, as part of the combined operations under the Franco-Ottoman alliance. It involved the fleet commanded by Ottoman admiral Hayreddin Barbarossa.

== Course ==
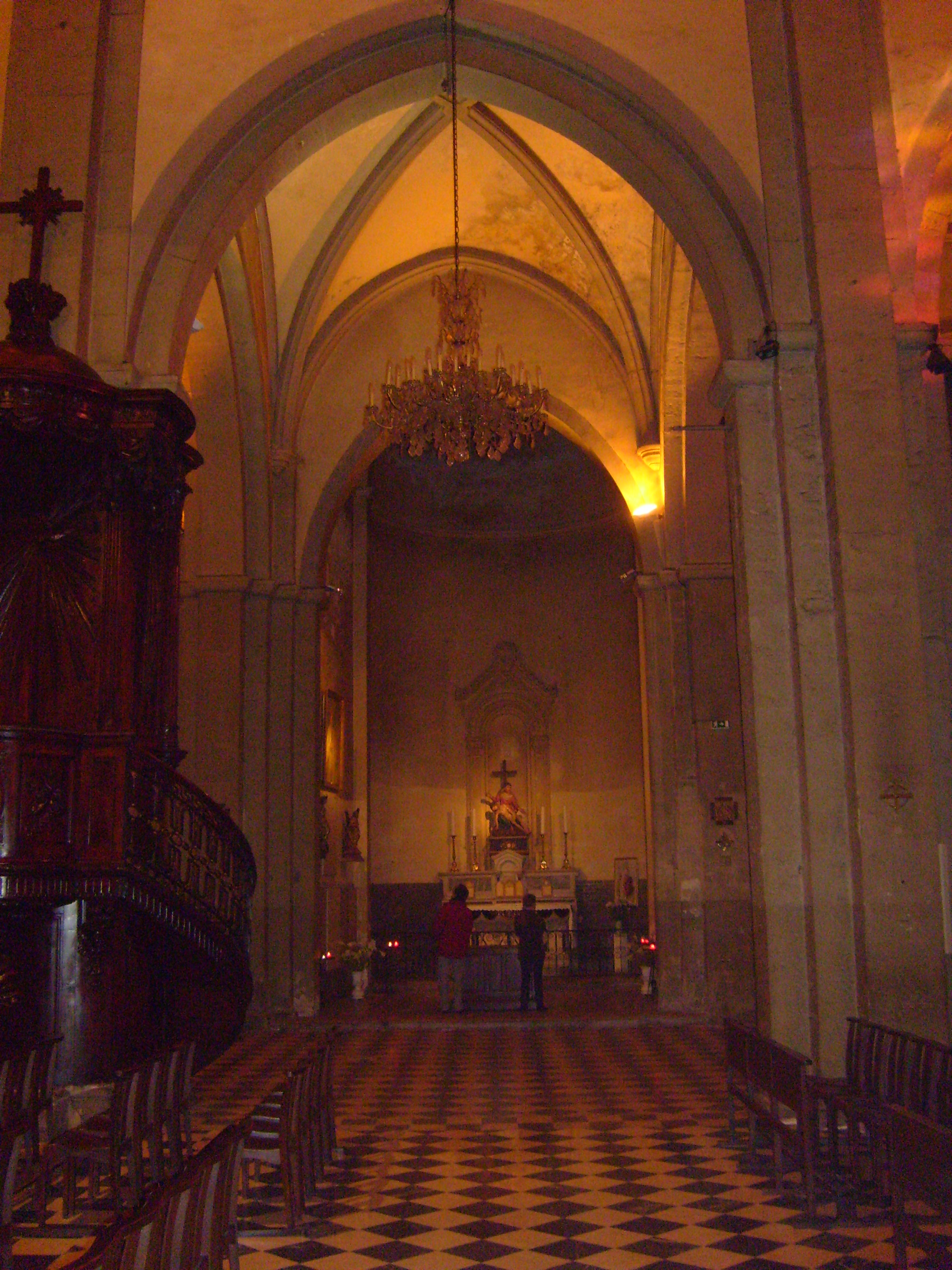
Toulon Cathedral was temporarily transformed into a mosque.

Francis offered to let the Ottomans winter at Toulon so that they could continue to harass Habsburg coastal possessions in Spain and Italy:

"Lodge the Lord Barbarossa sent to the king by the Great Turk, with his Turkish Army and grands seigneurs to the number of 30,000 combatants during the winter in his town and port of Toulon... for the accommodation of the said army as well as the well-being of all this coast, it will not be suitable for the inhabitants of Toulon to remain and mingle with the Turkish nation, because of difficulties which might arise."

— Instruction of Francis I to his Lord Lieutenant of Provence.

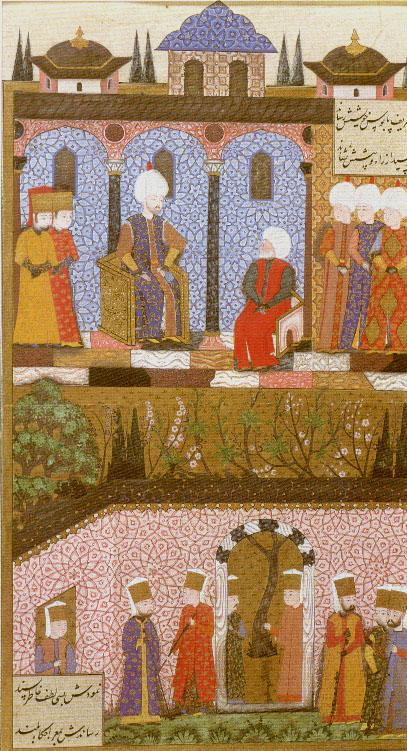
Suleiman receiving Barbarossa in Constantinople.

Only the heads of households were allowed to remain in the city, with the rest of the population having to leave, on pain of death. Francis I compensated the city's inhabitants by exempting them from the taille tax for a period of 10 years. Toulon Cathedral was transformed into a mosque with the call to prayer occurring five times a day, and Ottoman coinage was the currency of choice. Christian slaves were being sold in Toulon throughout the period. According to an observer: "Seeing Toulon, one might imagine oneself at Constantinople".

Throughout the winter, Ottoman forces under Admiral Salih Reis were able to carry out raids from Toulon. They raided and bombarded Barcelona in Spain, and Sanremo, Borghetto Santo Spirito, Ceriale in the Republic of Genoa, and defeated Italo-Spanish naval attacks. Sailing with his whole fleet to Genoa, Barbarossa negotiated with Andrea Doria the release of Turgut Reis.

Barbarossa found the Toulon base very pleasant and convenient, since it meant he could maintain an effective blockade against the Empire whilst having Francis pay to refit his ships - the Lord Lieutenant of Provence complained about Barbarossa that "he takes his ease while emptying the coffers of France". The Ottomans finally departed from their Toulon base after a stay of 8 months, on 23 May 1544, after Francis I had paid 800,000 ecus to Barbarossa. He also refused to leave until all Turkish and Barbary corsairs were freed from the French galleys and pillaged five French ships in the harbour of Toulon in order to provision his fleet.

== Return to Constantinople ==
Five French galleys, under the command of the "Général des galères" Captain Polin, accompanied Barbarossa’s fleet, on a diplomatic mission to Sultan Suleiman. The French fleet accompanied Barbarossa during his attacks on the west coast of Italy on the way to Constantinople, as he laid waste to the cities of Porto Ercole, Giglio, Talamona, Lipari and took about 6,000 captives, but separated in Sicily from Barbarossa’s fleet to continue alone to the Ottoman capital.

This would be one of the last naval campaigns of Barbarossa, who died 2 years later in Constantinople in 1546.

== Aftermath ==
Toulon would again be used as a safe harbour for several months by Turgut Reis from August 1546, when he was pursued by the fleet of Genoese admiral Andrea Doria.

== Gallery ==
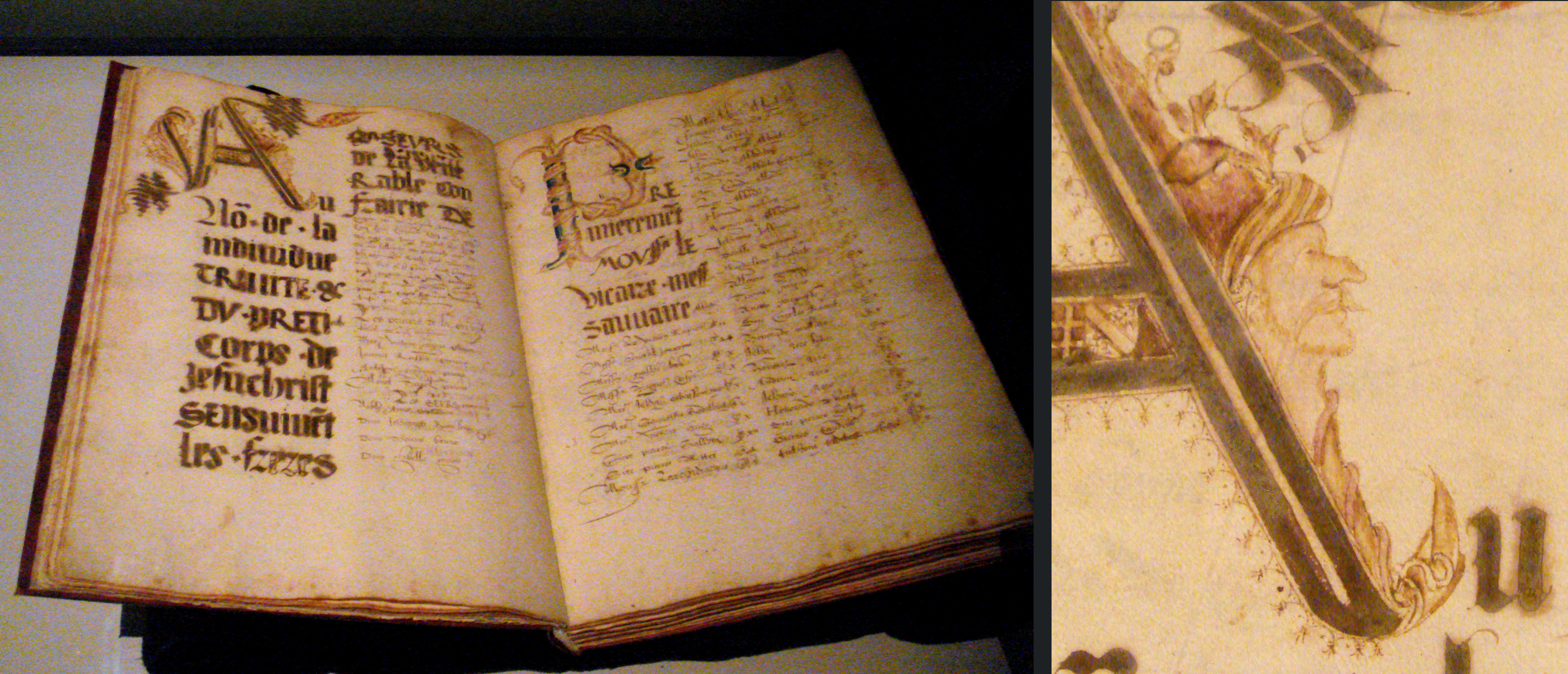
Catulaire des confréries de la Chapelle, with Ottoman head, Toulon, 1550.

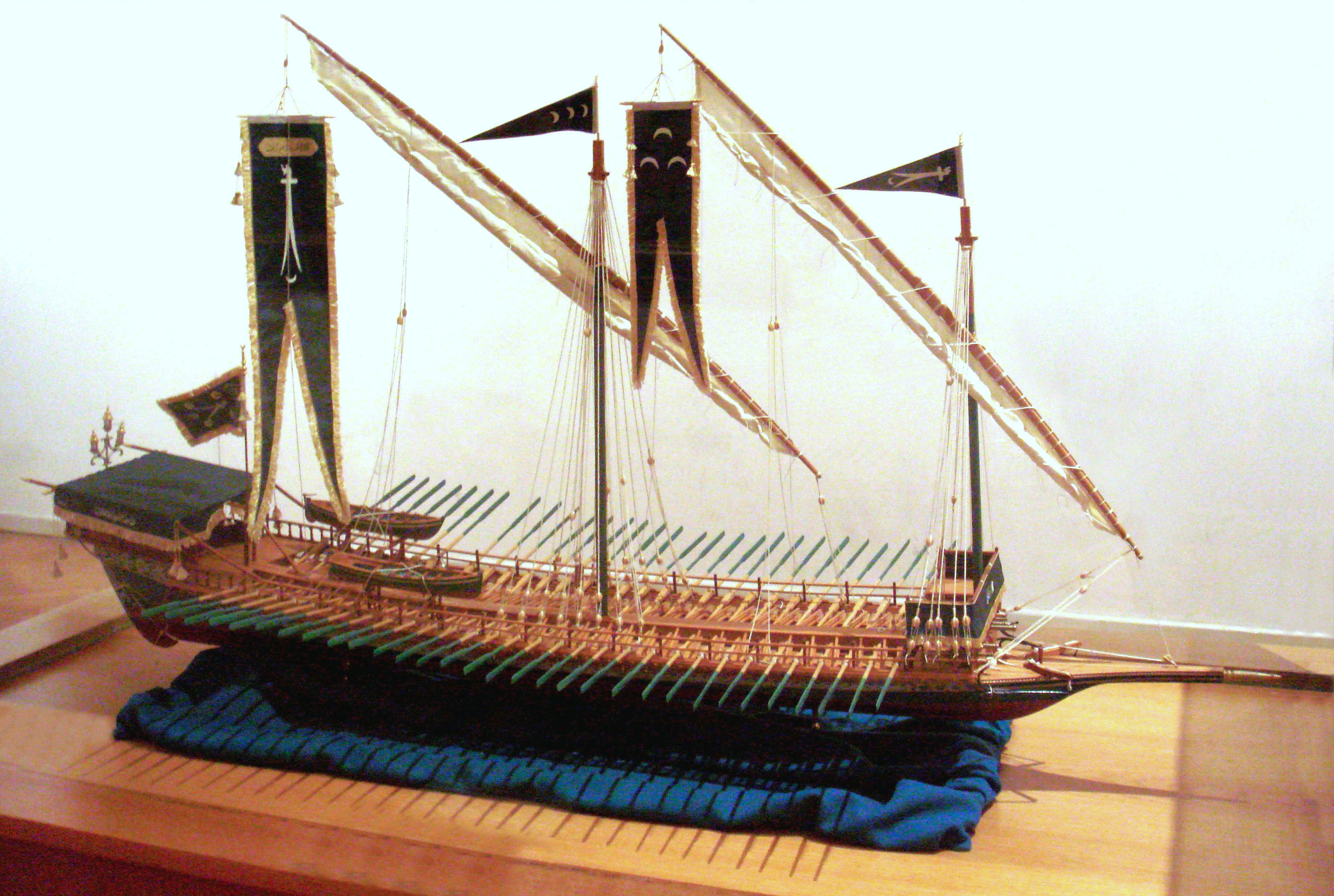
Barbarossa's galley during his campaign in France, 1543. Istanbul Naval Museum.

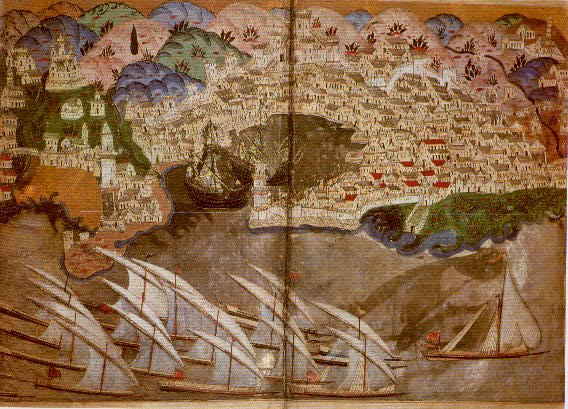
Ottoman fleet in front of Genoa in 1544.

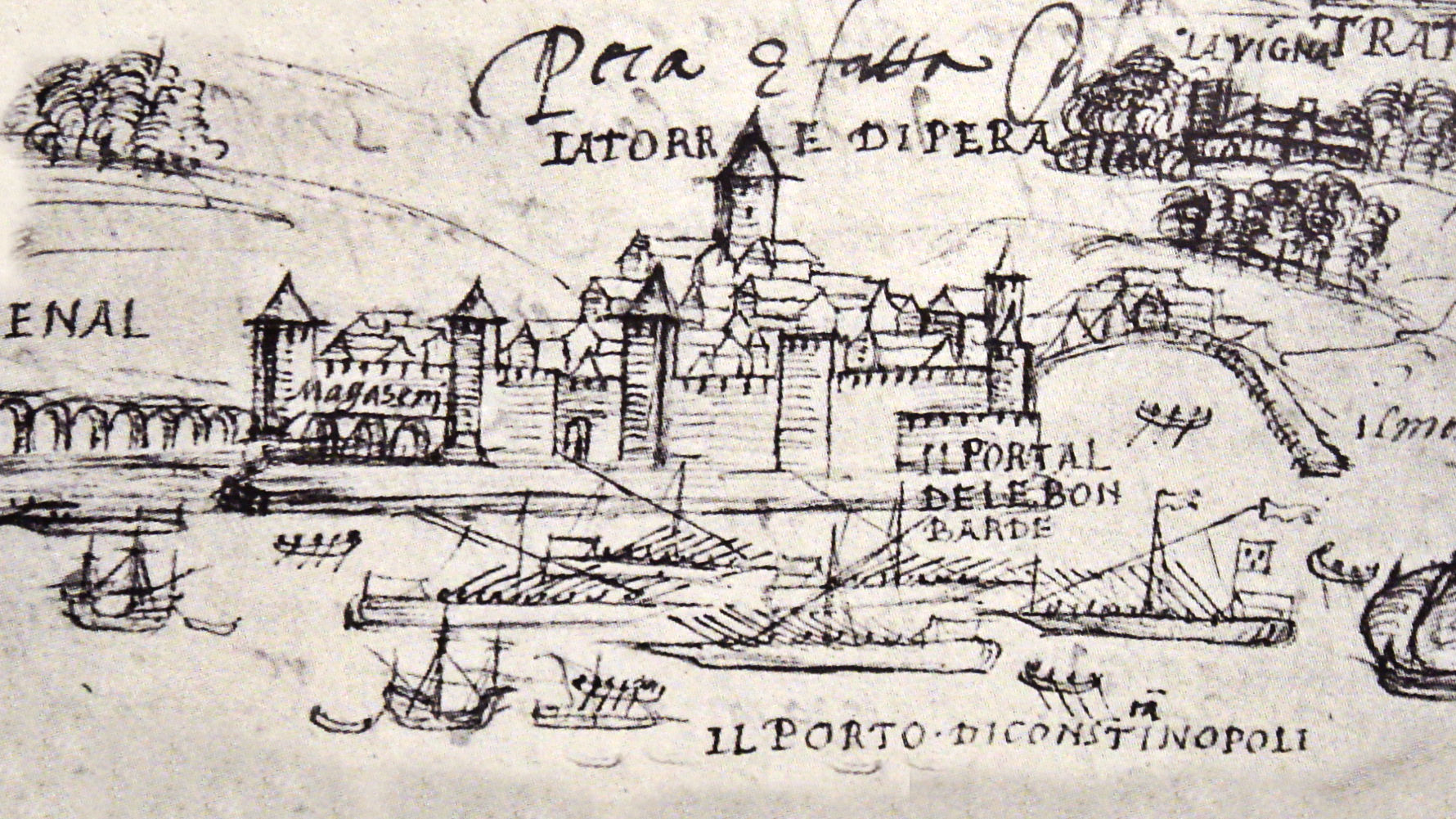
The French galleys of Captain Polin in front of Pera near Constantinople in August 1544, drawn by Jérôme Maurand.
