= Invasion of Corsica =

Invasion of Corsica may refer to a number of historical events including:

- Invasion of Corsica (1553)
- French Conquest of Corsica
- British Intervention in Corsica (1794)
