= Chesneau =

Chesneau is a French surname. Notable people with the surname include:

- César Chesneau Dumarsais (1676–1756), French philosophe and grammarian
- Didier Chesneau (active from 1994), French guitarist, composer, sound engineer and director
- Jean Chesneau (fl. 1547), French writer and secretary to the French ambassador to the Ottoman Empire
- Michel Chesneau (before 1770 – after 1805), French naval officer who fought at the Battle of Trafalgar
- Olivier Chesneau (1972–2014), French astronomer
- Roger Chesneau (1925–2012), French steeplechaser who competed in the 1948 Summer Olympics

== See also ==
- (6065) Chesneau, a main-belt minor planet
