= Jacques de Germigny =

French ambassador

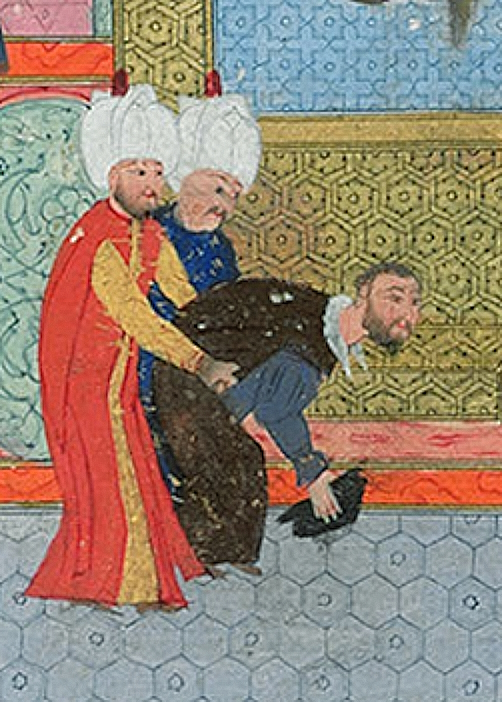
Sultan Murad III receiving Jacques de Germigny, 1581

Jacques de Germigny was French Ambassador to the Ottoman Empire from 1579 to 1585. He succeeded to Gilles de Noailles as ambassador. He was sent to the Ottoman Empire by Henry III of France. He was succeeded by Jacques Savary de Lancosme.

During his tenure, the Ottoman ambassador Ali Aga, went to France to visit Henry III of France and bring him the renewal of the Franco-Ottoman Capitulations.

== See also ==
- Franco-Ottoman alliance

Diplomatic posts
| Preceded by Gilles de Noailles | French Ambassador to the Ottoman Empire; 1579–1585 | Succeeded by Jacques Savary de Lancosme |
