= Jourdan des Ursins =

Corsican French general (1500–1564)

Jourdan des Ursins (1500–1564), or originally Giordano degli Orsini, was a Corsican general of the French army who participated with Sampiero Corso in the Invasion of Corsica (1553). After the invasion, parts of the island, especially Calvi and Bastia, were reclaimed by the Genoese, but many areas remained under French control. In 1555, Jourdan des Ursins replaced de Thermes, and was named "Gouverneur et lieutenant général du roi dans l'île de Corse". He was in command of the French-controlled areas of the island until the 1559 Peace of Cateau Cambrésis when France formally returned Corsica to Genoa.
