= Guillaume de Grandchamp de Grantrie =

French ambassador

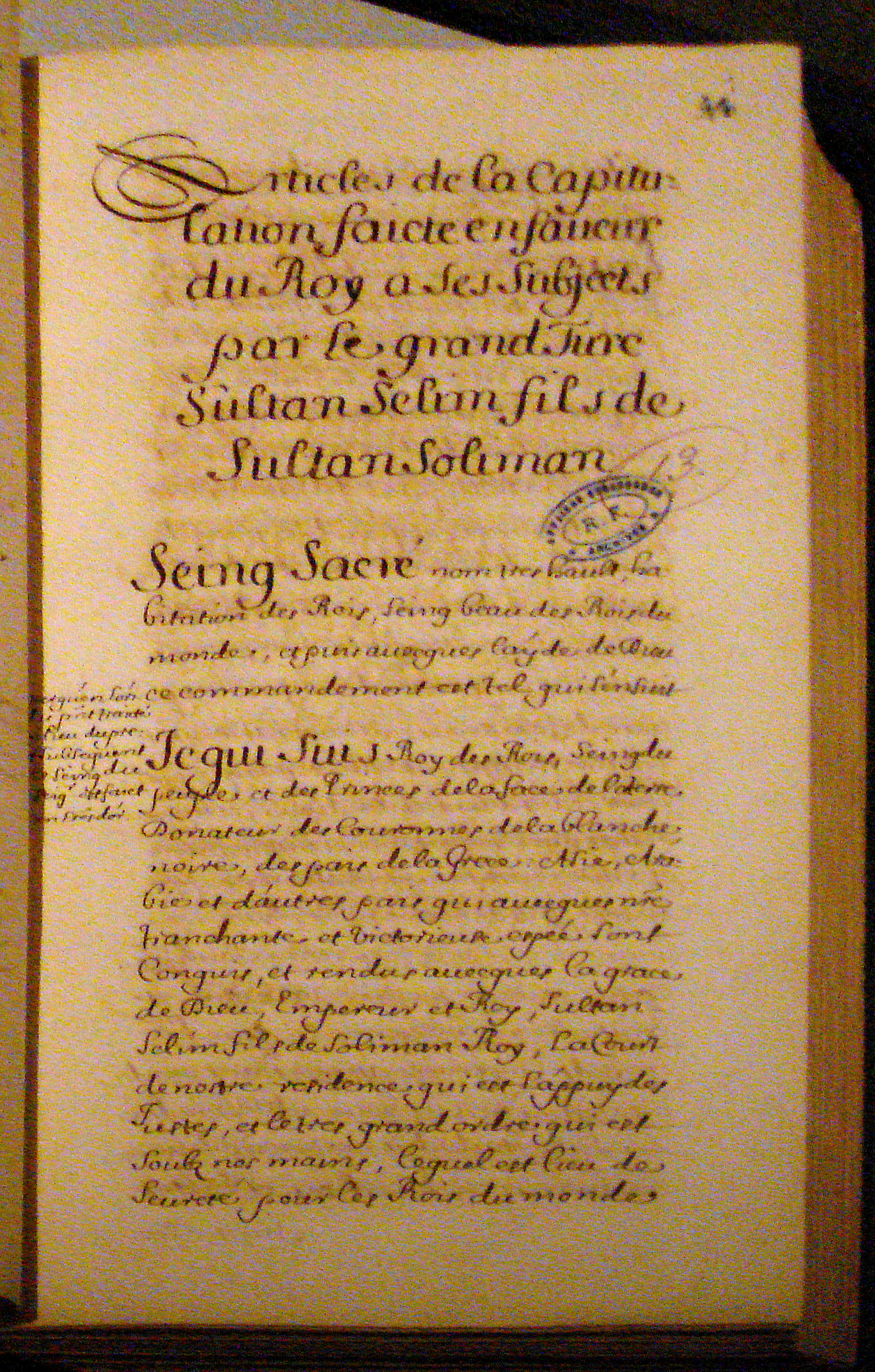
The 1569 Capitulations between Charles IX and Selim II, negotiated under Guillaume de Grandchamp de Grantrie by Claude du Bourg de Guérines.

Guillaume de Grandchamp de Grantrie was French Ambassador to the Ottoman Empire from 1566 to 1571.

From 1566, he notably proposed to the Ottoman Court a plan, devised by Charles IX of France and Catherine de Medicis, to settle French Huguenots and French and German Lutherans in Moldavia, in order to create a military colony and a buffer against the Habsburgs. This plan also had the added advantage of removing the Huguenots from France, then a major issue due to the French Wars of Religion. He offered himself to become the Voyvoda of Moldavia, who would pay a tribute of 20,000 ducats to the Ottomans.

In 1569, during the tenure of Grandchamp, the Ottomans seized French and foreign ships under French flags in order to recover a debt estimated to 150,000 Écus or ducats that Charles IX owed to the Ottoman money-lender Joseph Nasi. After protests, only the French ships and goods were kept, totalling an amount of about 42,000 ducats. The goods were at least partially returned with the signature of the 1569 Capitulations.

== See also ==
- Franco-Ottoman alliance

Diplomatic posts
Preceded by Jean Cavenac de la Vigne	French Ambassador to the Ottoman Empire; 1566–1571	Succeeded by François de Noailles
