= Michel de Codignac =

French diplomat

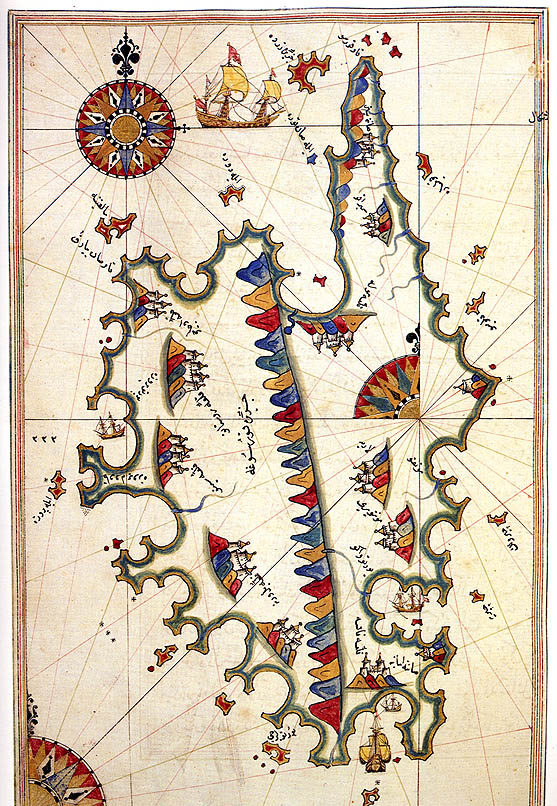
Codignac was involved in the diplomacy behind the Franco-Ottoman invasion of Corsica in 1553.

Michel de Codignac was French Ambassador to the Ottoman Empire from 1553 to 1556, and successor to Gabriel de Luetz d'Aramon.

Michel de Codignac lobbied for Ottoman support during the Invasion of Corsica (1553). He is known to have participated to Suleiman's Persian campaigns, and to have sailed with the Ottoman fleet in its campaign against Piombino, Elba and Corsica in 1555.

The last few months of Codignac in the Ottoman Empire were difficult ones, as he was attacked by Rüstem Pasha for the failure of the French government to repay debts to the Ottomans. Codignac himself had apparently incurred debts and was disgraced by the Sultan.

He returned to Europe in 1558, passing through Venice in July 1558, and entered in the service of Philip II of Spain, to the ire of the French government.

== See also ==
- Franco-Ottoman alliance

== Notes ==
Diplomatic posts
| Preceded by Gabriel de Luetz d'Aramont | French Ambassador to the Ottoman Empire; 1553–1556 | Succeeded by Jean Cavenac de la Vigne |
