= Gabriel de Luetz =

French ambassador

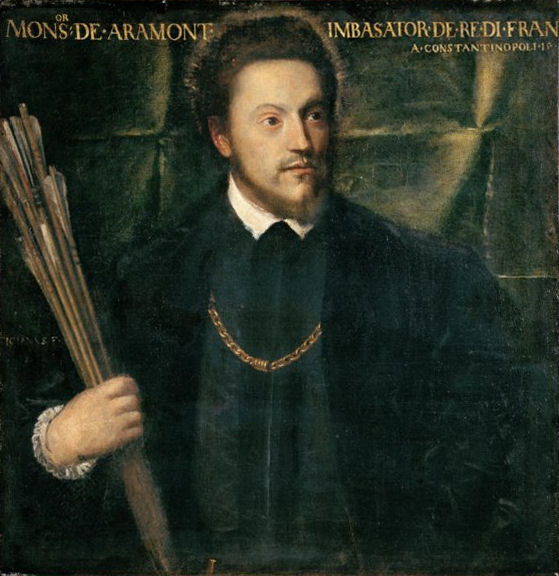
Portrait of ambassador to the Ottoman Porte Gabriel de Luetz d'Aramont, by Titian, 1541–1542, oil on canvas, 76 x 74 cm.

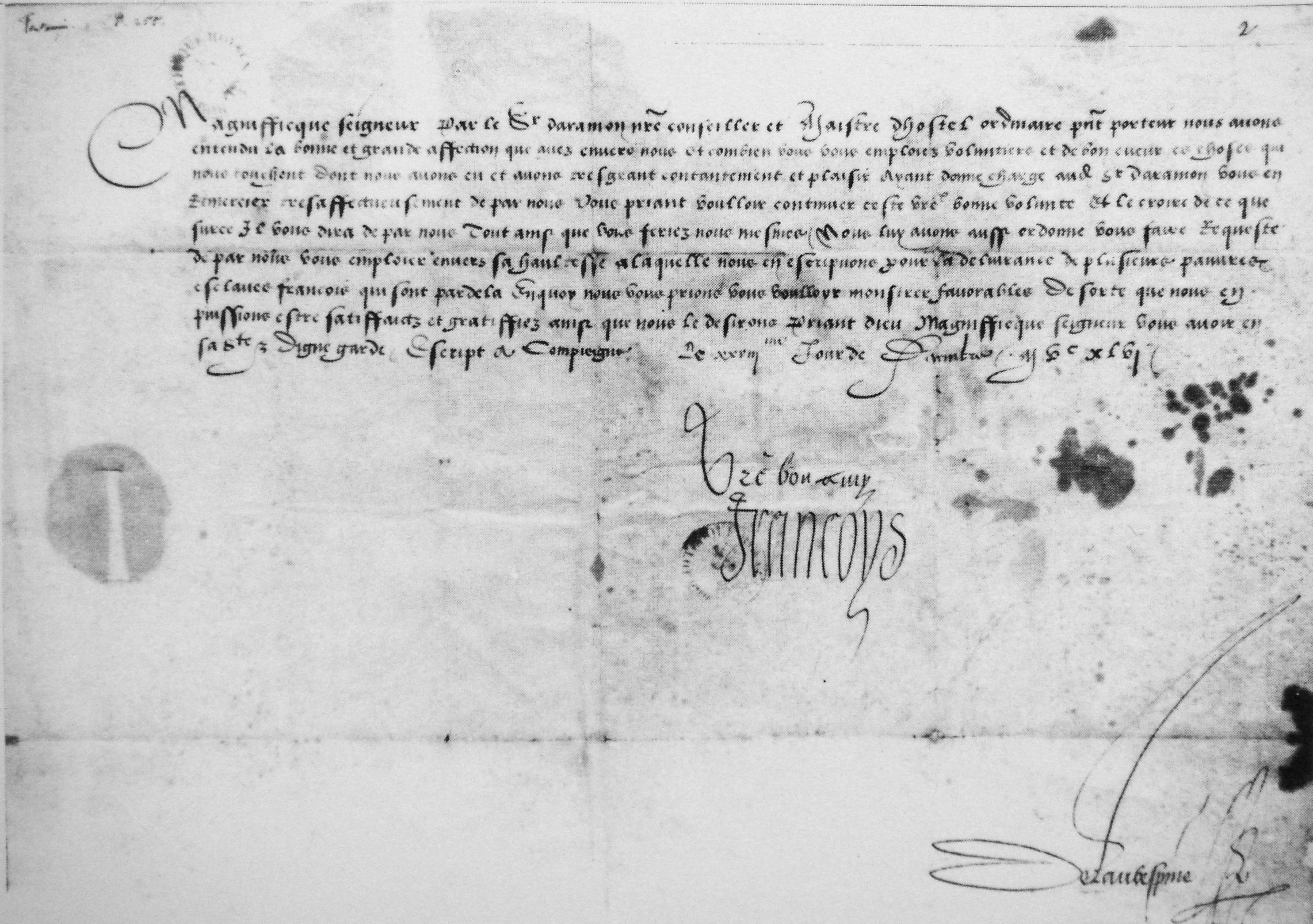
Letter of Francis I to the Drogman Janus Bey, 28 December 1546, delivered by Gabriel de Luetz d'Aramon. The letter is countersigned by the State Secretary Claude de L'Aubespine.

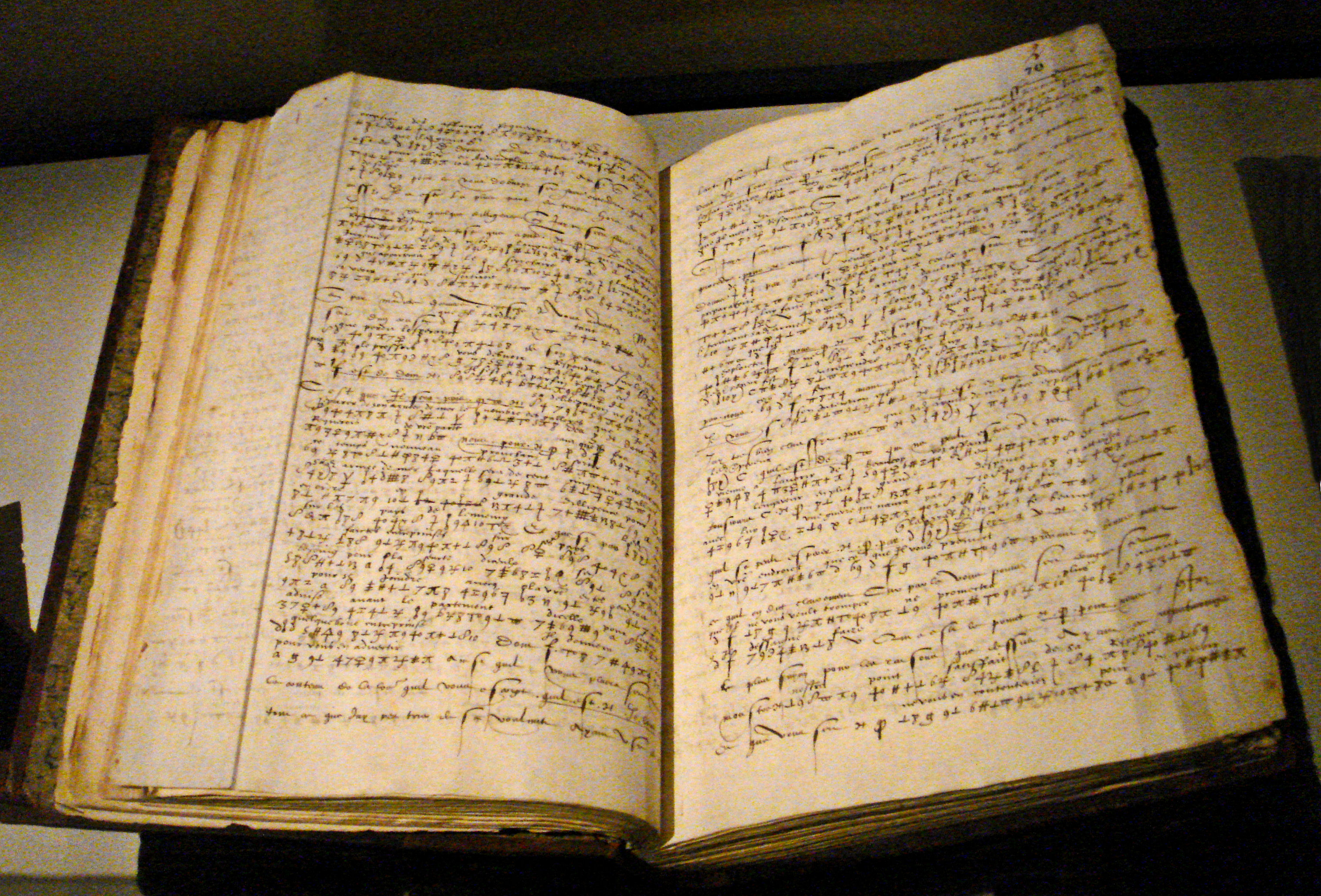
Encoded letter of Gabriel de Luetz d'Aramon, after 1546, with partial deciphering, an interesting example of cryptography in the 16th century.

Gabriel de Luetz, Baron et Seigneur d'Aramon et de Vallabregues (died 1553), often also abbreviated to Gabriel d'Aramon, was the French Ambassador to the Ottoman Empire from 1546 to 1553, in the service first of Francis I, who dispatched him to the Ottoman Empire, and then of the French king Henry II. Gabriel de Luetz was accompanied by a vast suite of scientists, Jean de Monluc, philosopher Guillaume Postel, botanist Pierre Belon, naturalist Pierre Gilles d'Albi, the future cosmographer André Thévet, traveler Nicolas de Nicolay who would publish their findings upon their return to France and contribute greatly to the development of early science in France.

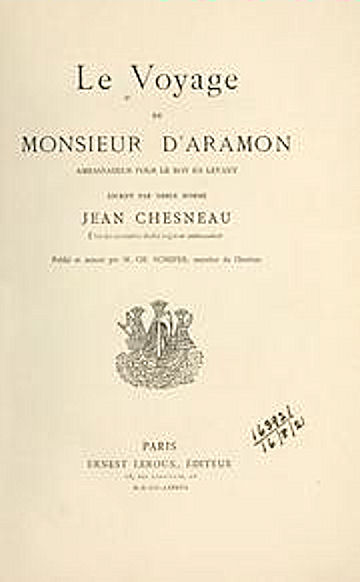
Le Voyage de Monsieur d'Aramon dans le Levant by Jean Chesneau, 1547.

== Ottoman Safavid War ==
In 1547, he accompanied Suleiman the Magnificent in the Ottoman–Safavid War (1532–55), with two of his secretaries, Jacques Gassut and Jean Chesneau, and is recorded as having given advice to the Sultan on some aspects of the campaign. Chesneau wrote Le Voyage de Monsieur d'Aramon dans le Levant, an interesting account of the travels of Gabriel de Luetz.

== Siege of Tripoli ==
In 1551, Gabriel de Luetz joined the Ottoman fleet to attend to the Siege of Tripoli, with two galleys and a galliot.

== Calabrian Raid ==
Gabriel de Luetz is also known to have convinced Suleiman to send a fleet against Charles V, for a combined Franco-Turkish action in 1552. In July 1552, the fleet raided Rhegium in Calabria, laying waste to 30 miles of coast, with Gabriel de Luetz onboard who reported the devastation in a dispatch to the king of France on 22 July:

"[The Turks] burnt all the castles and villages on their descent, for twelve or fifteen miles along the shore, and, without making any stop, the said Captain of the fleet, following the coast, intended to spread the flames from one end of the coast to the other."

— Gabriel de Luetz to the king of France.

Gabriel de Luetz was succeeded by Michel de Codignac as ambassador to the Sublime Porte, who himself was succeeded by Jean Cavenac de la Vigne.

Diplomatic posts
Preceded by Antoine Escalin des Aimars	French Ambassador to the Ottoman Empire; 1547–1553	Succeeded by Michel de Codignac

== Representation in fiction ==
Gabriel de Luetz (as M. d'Aramon, Baron de Luetz) plays a small but significant role in the books The Disorderly Knights and Pawn in Frankincense, volumes three and four of the historical fiction series known as the Lymond Chronicles, by Dorothy Dunnett. The Disorderly Knights is partly set in Malta among the. Knights Hospitaller of St. John and on Tripoli at the time of that city's surrender to the Ottoman Turks in 1551. Pawn in Frankincense is partly set in Constantinople and Pera in 1553.

== See also ==
- Franco-Ottoman alliance
