= List of ambassadors of France to the Ottoman Empire =

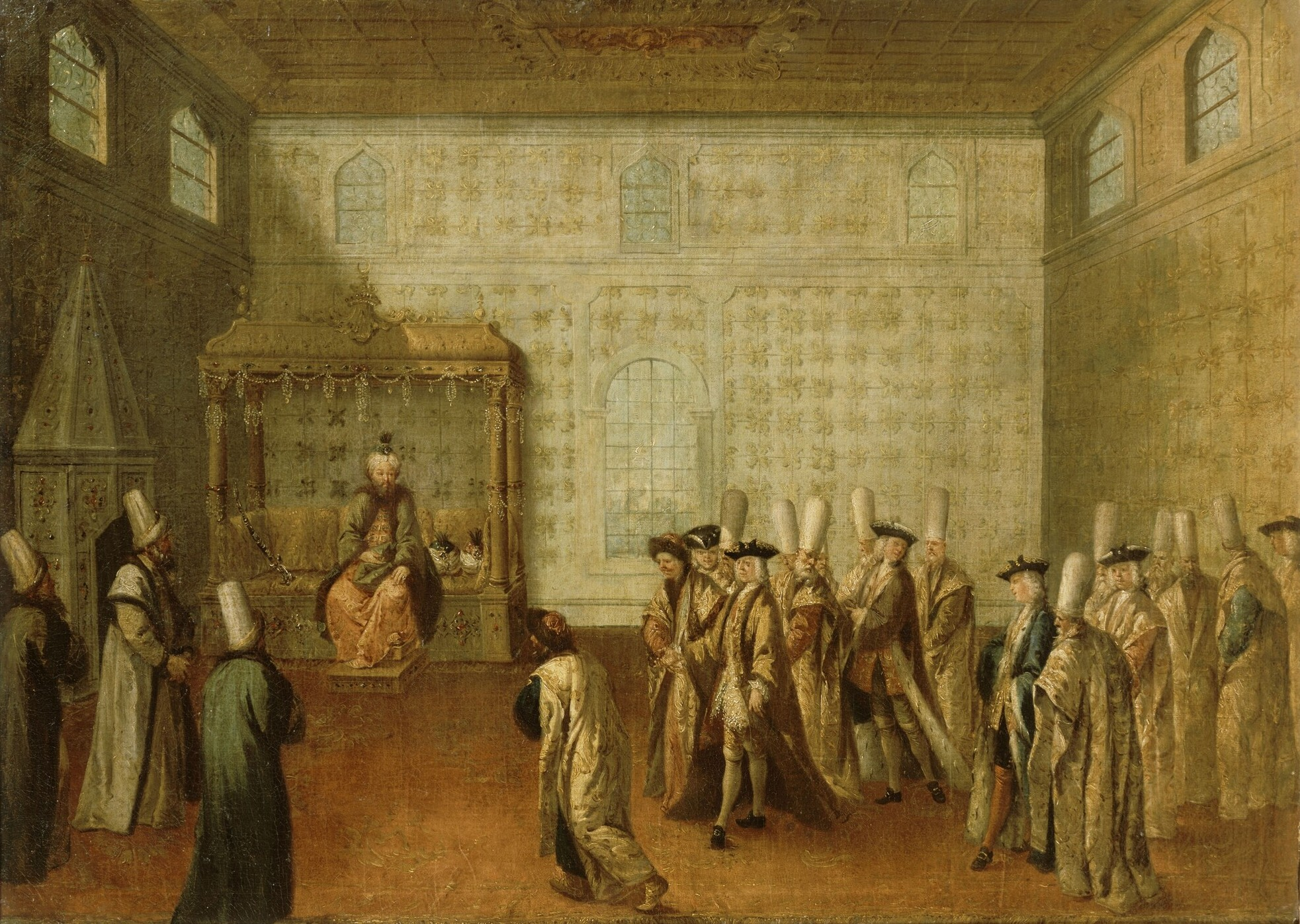
Ahmed III receiving the embassy of Charles de Ferriol in 1699; painting by Jean-Baptiste van Mour

France had a permanent embassy to the Ottoman Empire beginning in 1535, during the time of King Francis I and Sultan Suleiman the Magnificent. It is considered to have been the direct predecessor of the modern-day embassy to the Republic of Turkey.

== List of ambassadors ==
=== Under the Ancien Régime ===
Ambassadors of Ancien Régime France. Embassy established in Constantinople.

The first ambassador was preceded by an envoy: Jean Frangipani.

- Jean de la Forét 1535–1538
- Antonio Rincon 1538–1541
- Antoine Escalin des Eymars 1541–1547
- Gabriel de Luetz d'Aramont 1547–1553
- Michel de Codignac 1553–1556
- Jean Cavenac de la Vigne 1556–1566
- Guillaume de Grandchamp de Grantrie 1566–1571
- François de Noailles 1571–1575
- Gilles de Noailles 1575–1579
- Jacques de Germigny 1579–1585
- Jacques Savary de Lancosme 1585–1589
- François Savary de Brèves 1589–1607
- Jean-François de Gontaut-Biron 1607–1611
- Achille de Harlay 1611–1620
- Philippe de Harlay 1620–1631
- Henry de Gournay 1631–1639
- Jean de La Hay 1639–1665
- Denis de La Haye 1665–1670
- Charles Marie François Olier, marquis de Nointel 1670–1679
- Gabriel de Guilleragues 1679–1686
- Pierre de Girardin 1686–1689
- Pierre-Antoine de Castanier1689–1692
- Charles de Ferriol 1692–1711
- Pierre Puchot 1711–1716
- Jean-Louis d'Usson 1716
- Jean-Baptiste Louis Picon1724–1728
- Louis Sauveur Villeneuve 1728–1741
- Michel-Ange Castellane1741–1747
- Roland Puchot 1747–1755
- Charles Gravier de Vergennes 1755–1768
- François Emmanuel Guignard 1768–1784
- Marie-Gabriel-Florent-Auguste de Choiseul-Gouffier 1784–1792

=== French Revolution and First French Empire ===
Ambassadors under the French Revolution and First French Empire.

- Charles Louis Huguet 1792–1796 – in name only
- Raymond de Verninac Saint-Maur (1795 -1797)
- Jean-Baptiste Annibal Aubert du Bayet 1796–1797
- Guillaume Marie-Anne Brune 1802–1806
- Horace François Sébastiani 1806–1812
- Antoine François Andréossy 1812–1815

=== 1815–1914 ===
Ambassadors under the Bourbon Restoration, July Monarchy, Second Republic, Second Empire and Third Republic.

- Charles François de Riffardeau, marquis de Rivière 1815–1821
- Florimond de Faÿ de La Tour-Maubourg 1821–1823
- Armand Charles Guilleminot 1823–1832
- Albin Reine Roussin 1832–1839
- Edouard Pontois 1839–1841
- François-Adolphe de Bourqueney 1844–1851
- Charles La Valette 1851–1853
- Edmond de Lacour 1853-1853
- Achille Baraguey d'Hilliers 1853–1855
- Edouard Antoine de Thouvenel 1855–1860
- Charles La Valette 1860–1861
- Lionel Désiré Marie François René Moustiers 1861–1866
- Nicolas Prosper Bourée 1866–1870
- Louis Dubreuil-Héliou La Gueronnière 1870–1871
- Eugène-Melchior de Vogüé 1871–1875
- Jean-François Guillaume Bourgoing 1875–1877
- Hugues Fournier 1877–1880
- Charles-Joseph Tissot 1880–1882
- Emmanuel Henri Victurnien de Noailles 1882–1886
- Gustave Lannes de Montebello 1886–1891
- Paul Cambon 1891–1898
- Jean Antoine Ernest Constans 1898–1909
- Maurice Bompard 1909–1914

== See also ==
- Franco-Ottoman alliance
- French Ambassador to Turkey (1925–present)
