= Jean-Louis d'Usson =

French diplomat

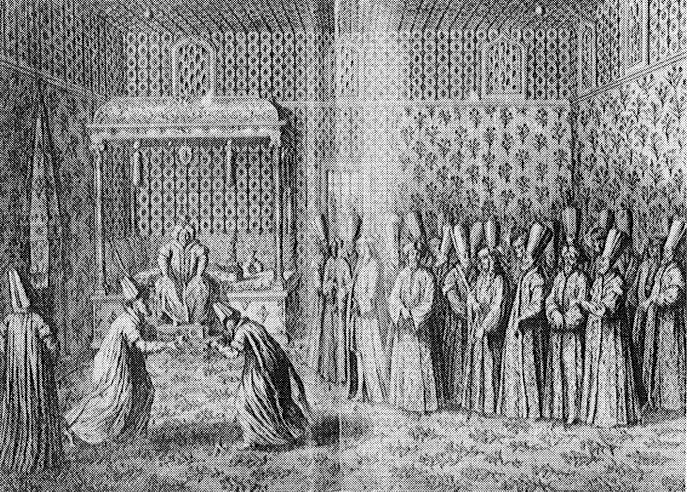
French ambassador Marquis de Bonnac being received by Sultan Ahmed III.

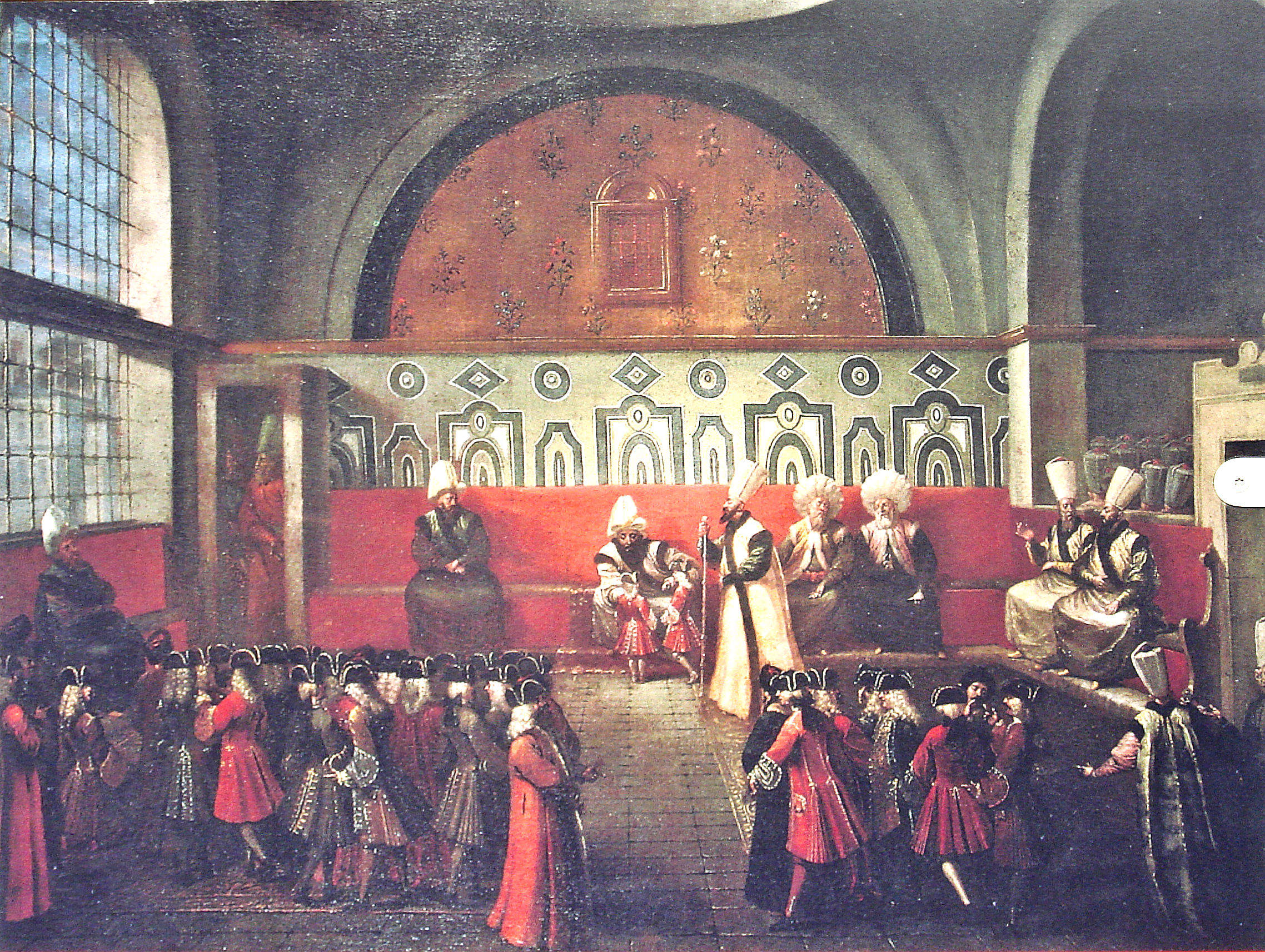
Reception of the children of Marquis de Bonnac by the Ottoman Sultan, by Jean-Baptiste van Mour.

Jean Louis d'Usson, Marquis de Bonnac (1672-1738) was French Ambassador to the Ottoman Empire from 1716 until 1724. One of his main missions was to assure that the Ottoman Empire remained a threat to the Habsburgs, the main rival of France in Europe, a regular objective of the Franco-Ottoman alliance. He wrote Mémoire historique sur l'Ambassade de France à Constantinople.

From 1690 to 1694 he was a musketeer. In 1694 he was captain of a dragoons company. In 1696 he entered the diplomatic service and served as secretary to his uncle fr:François d'Usson de Bonrepaus in Denmark. In 1698 he replaced uncle François d'Usson de Bonrepaus as Chargé d'affaires in The Hague. In 1700 he was envoy extraordinary to the Principality of Brunswick-Wolfenbüttel, were in 1701 he was replaced by uncle François d'Usson de Bonrepaus and went to the Court of Stockholm. From 1707 to 1710 he was representative at the court of Stanisław Leszczyński. In May 1711 he replaced Jean-Denis de Blécourt at El Escorial where he was till 1713 as envoy extraordinary.

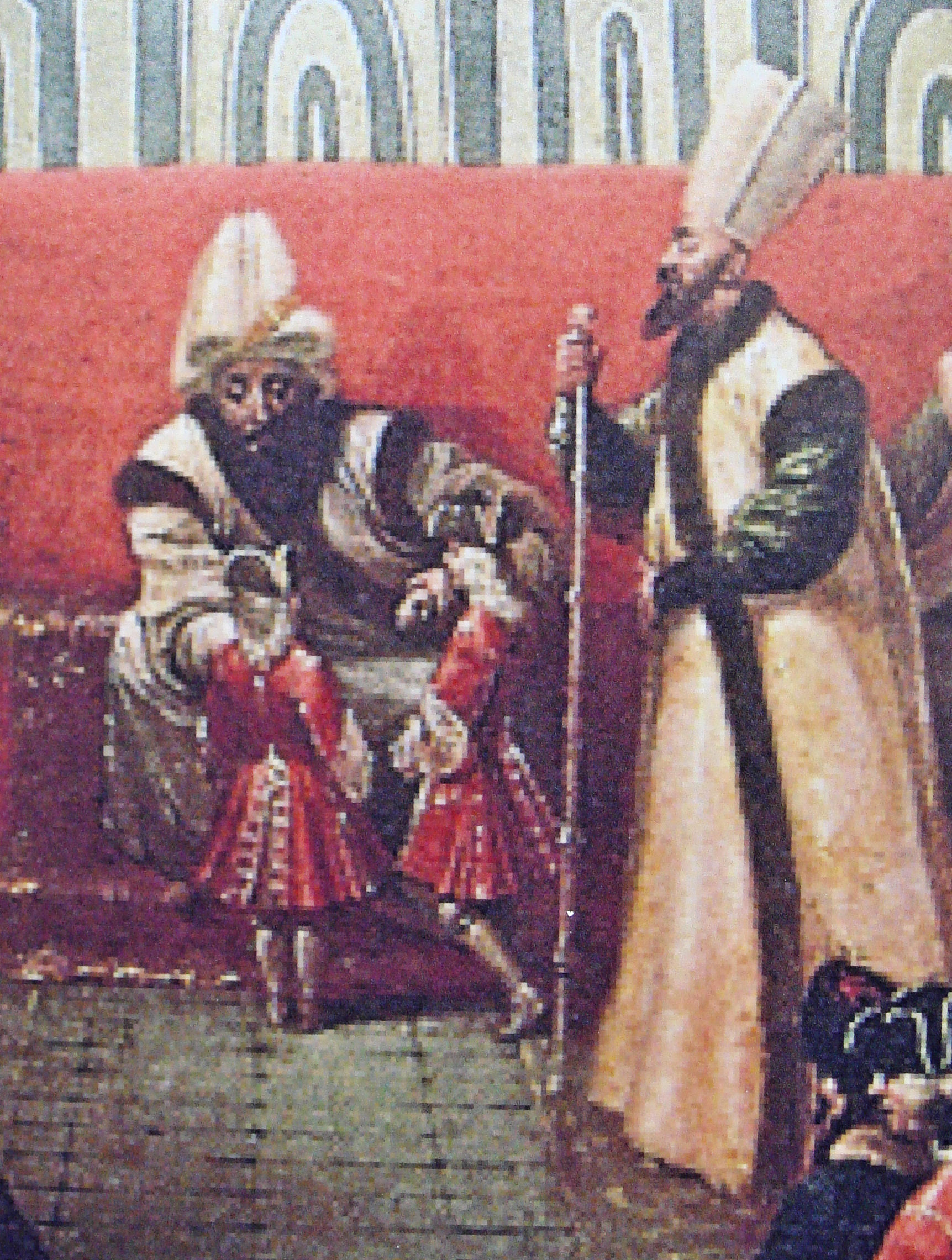
Reception of the children of Marquis de Bonnac by the Ottoman Sultan (detail).

== Notes ==
Diplomatic posts
Preceded by Pierre Puchot	French Ambassador to the Ottoman Empire; 1716–1724	Succeeded by Jean-Baptiste Louis Picon
