= Gilles de Noailles =

French ambassador

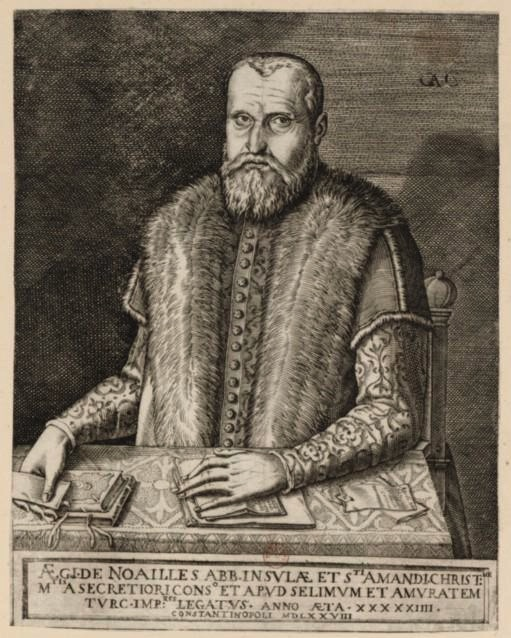
Gilles de Noailles (1578 engraving)

Gilles de Noailles, abbé de l'Isle (1524–1600) was French Ambassador to the Ottoman Empire from 1575 to 1579. He was the brother of his predecessor as ambassador, François de Noailles, and was succeeded by Jacques de Germigny. He was sent to the Ottoman Empire by Henry III of France.

Gilles was one of three brothers who served as French diplomats, three of the nineteen children of Louis de Noailles and Catherine de Pierre-Buffière. Gilles became Bishop of Dax after the death of his brother François. Gilles' other offices included; Master of Requests, Parliamentary Councillor for Bordeaux, and Ambassador (or French agent) in Poland and in England during the crisis of the Scottish Reformation.

In October 1556, he was the French agent in London and was recalled to Paris when his brother, newly made the Bishop of Dax was sent as ambassador. He was surprised to find his landlord charging him rent, having expected Mary Tudor to pay.

== 1559 and the Reformation in Scotland ==
Noailles was the resident diplomat in London during the Scottish Reformation, his secretary was Bertrand de Salignac de la Mothe-Fénelon. He supported the rule of French-born Mary of Guise in Scotland, while Elizabeth I offered aid to her Protestant opponents. In August 1559, at Horsley in Surrey, Elizabeth seemed more interested in watching her courtiers "running at the ring" than hearing Noailles talk about French policy and Scotland, an impression calculated to assert her authority.

When James Hamilton, 3rd Earl of Arran, a son of a leader of the Scottish congregation, and her agent Thomas Randolph arrived in London in August 1559, Elizabeth secretly met them at Hampton Court. The next day, Elizabeth showed Noailles a portrait of Mary of Guise and praised her good qualities, assuring him of her commitment to peace and amity between England and Scotland.

Noailles wrote to the Cardinal of Lorraine that Elizabeth I of England celebrated All Saints Day, 1 November 1559, at Westminster Abbey with candles and a crucifix at the altar, which surprised the Protestants of London. He wondered if this signalled her intention to marry a Catholic prince, and thought the Scottish Protestants would not then find favour with her. In the same week both he and the Spanish Ambassador pretended to be ill to avoid the Lord Mayor's Banquet in case they were embarrassed by their relative precedence.

When Noailles intended to discuss the conflict in Scotland with Elizabeth on 5 November, he was invited to a palace gallery to watch a tournament in which Lord Robert and Baron Hunsdon opposed eighteen challengers. At the end of November, Noailles wrote to the Cardinal's sister, Mary of Guise in Scotland, explaining that her rebel Scottish lords had agreed with Elizabeth that the Earl of Arran would become King of Scotland as a vassal of England. He added that he thought it unlikely that Elizabeth would marry anyone.

== Mission to Scotland ==
Charles IX of France sent Gilles to Scotland in January 1561, his letter of credence was countersigned by Catherine de Medici. He was sent to the Parliament of Scotland to declare the willingness of Mary, Queen of Scots to forgive past offences during the Reformation and show her love, expecting their obedience in return. Mary and the French King wished the Auld Alliance to continue.

Gilles arrived at Edinburgh escorted by Lord Seton and 120 horsemen on 11 March 1561. He simply delivered his public message and left, according to the English diplomat Thomas Randolph offending no-one except that he refused to take a drink at his departure. The Scots refused to pay his expenses citing a clause of the Treaty of Edinburgh that no foreigner should hold office in Scotland.

== See also ==
- Franco-Ottoman alliance

Diplomatic posts
Preceded by François de Noailles	French Ambassador to the Ottoman Empire; 1575–1579	Succeeded by Jacques de Germigny
