= François de Noailles =

French ambassador

François de Noailles, (2 July 1519 – 19 September 1585) Papal Prothonotary, made Bishop of Dax in 1556, was French ambassador in Venice in the 1560s, and French ambassador of Charles IX to the Ottoman Empire from 1571 to 1575.

François was one of three brothers who served as French diplomats, three of the 19 children of Louis de Noailles and Catherine de Pierre-Buffière. He was born on 2 July 1519 at the Château de Noillac.

Within the context of a Franco-Ottoman alliance, and the obtention of special trading and diplomatic privileges between France and the Ottoman Empire since 1535–1536, François de Noailles endeavoured to maintain the diplomatic monopoly of France with the Ottoman Empire, in order to have economic and political leverage in the Mediterranean, against Spain and Italian city-states.

After the Battle of Lepanto, he tried to belittle the impact of the Christian naval victory over the Turk, claiming that overall not much ground had been gained over the Ottomans.

François de Noailles, Bishop of Dax (1556-1562), was a pro-Huguenot and as such was declared heretic by Pope Pius IV at the recommendation of the head of the Roman Inquisition Michele Ghislieri (the future Pope Pius V). In 1574, François de Noailles worked at obtaining the support of the Ottoman ruler Selim II in favour of William of Orange and the Dutch rebellion. Selim II sent his support through a messenger, who endeavoured to put the Dutch in contact with the rebellious Moriscos of Spain and the pirates of Algiers. Selim also sent a great fleet which conquered Tunis in October 1574, thus succeeding in reducing Spanish pressure on the Dutch, and leading to negotiations at the Conference of Breda.

François died at Bayonne on the 19 or 20 September 1585.

Diplomatic posts
Preceded by Guillaume de Grandchamp de Grantrie	French Ambassador to the Ottoman Empire; 1571-1575	Succeeded by Gilles de Noailles

== See also ==
- French Ambassador to the Ottoman Empire

== External links and sources ==
- Abbé de Vertot, ed., Ambassades de Messieurs de Noailles en Angleterre, vol.1, Leyden (1763)
