= French galley Réale (1538) =

Galley serving the French Crown (predates establishment of the French Royal Navy)

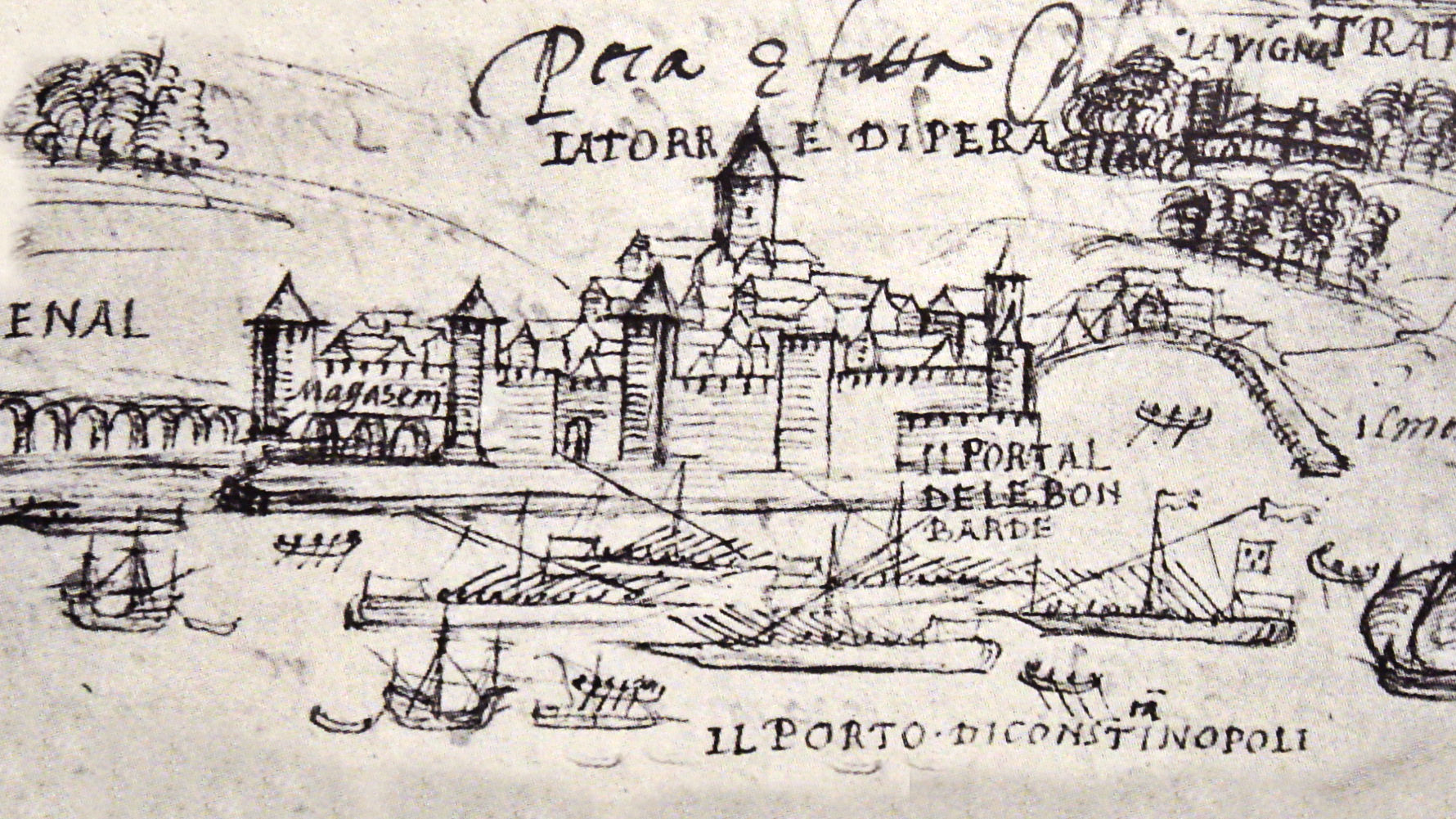
The five French galleys of Captain Polin, including Réale, in front of Pera at Constantinople in August 1544, drawn by Jérôme Maurand.

Réale was a French Royal galley of the 16th century.

In 1544, Captain Polin, "Général des galères" ("General of the galleys"), took five French galleys, including the superb Réale to Constantinople, accompanying Barbarossa's fleet, on a diplomatic mission to Suleiman the Magnificent, in execution of the Franco-Ottoman alliance. The French fleet accompanied Barbarossa during his attacks on the west coast of Italy on the way to Istanbul, as he laid waste to the cities of Porto Ercole, Giglio, Talamona, Lipari and took about 6,000 captives, but separated in Sicily from Barbarossa's fleet to continue alone to the Ottoman capital. Jerôme Maurand, a priest of Antibes who accompanied Polin and the Ottoman fleet in 1544, wrote a detailed account in Itinéraire d'Antibes à Constantinople. They arrived in Constantinople on 10 August 1544 to meet with Suleiman and give him an account of the campaign. Polin was back to Toulon on 2 October 1544.
