= Jacques Savary de Lancosme =

French diplomat

Jacques Savary de Lancosme was French ambassador to the Ottoman Porte from 1585 to 1589. He was a native of Poitou. He succeeded Jacques de Germiny. Lancosme entered into conflict with the first English Ambassador to the Porte William Harborne.

Lancosme associated himself with the Catholic League and refused to recognize Henry IV of France, leading to his imprisonment by the Ottomans and the nomination of his relative François Savary de Brèves as interim, and then full, ambassador.

Diplomatic posts
Preceded by Jacques de Germiny	French Ambassador to the Ottoman Empire; 1585–1589	Succeeded by François Savary de Brèves

== See also ==
- France-Asia relations
- Guillaume Postel
