= Jérôme Maurand =

French priest

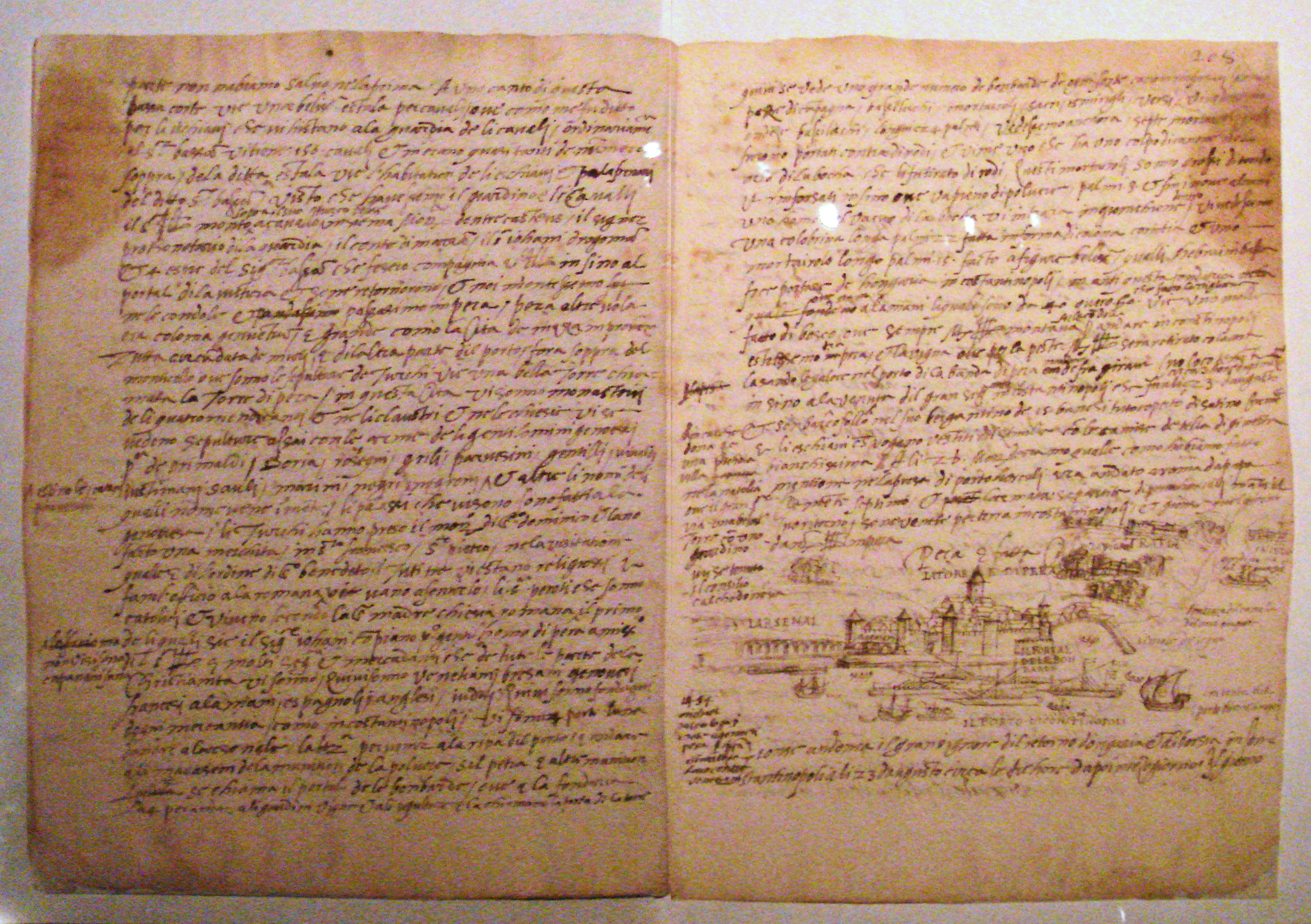
Jérôme Maurand, priest of Antibes, accompanied Polin and the Ottoman fleet in 1544, and wrote a detailed account in Itinéraire d'Antibes à Constantinople (including, here, a drawing of Constantinople), 1544.

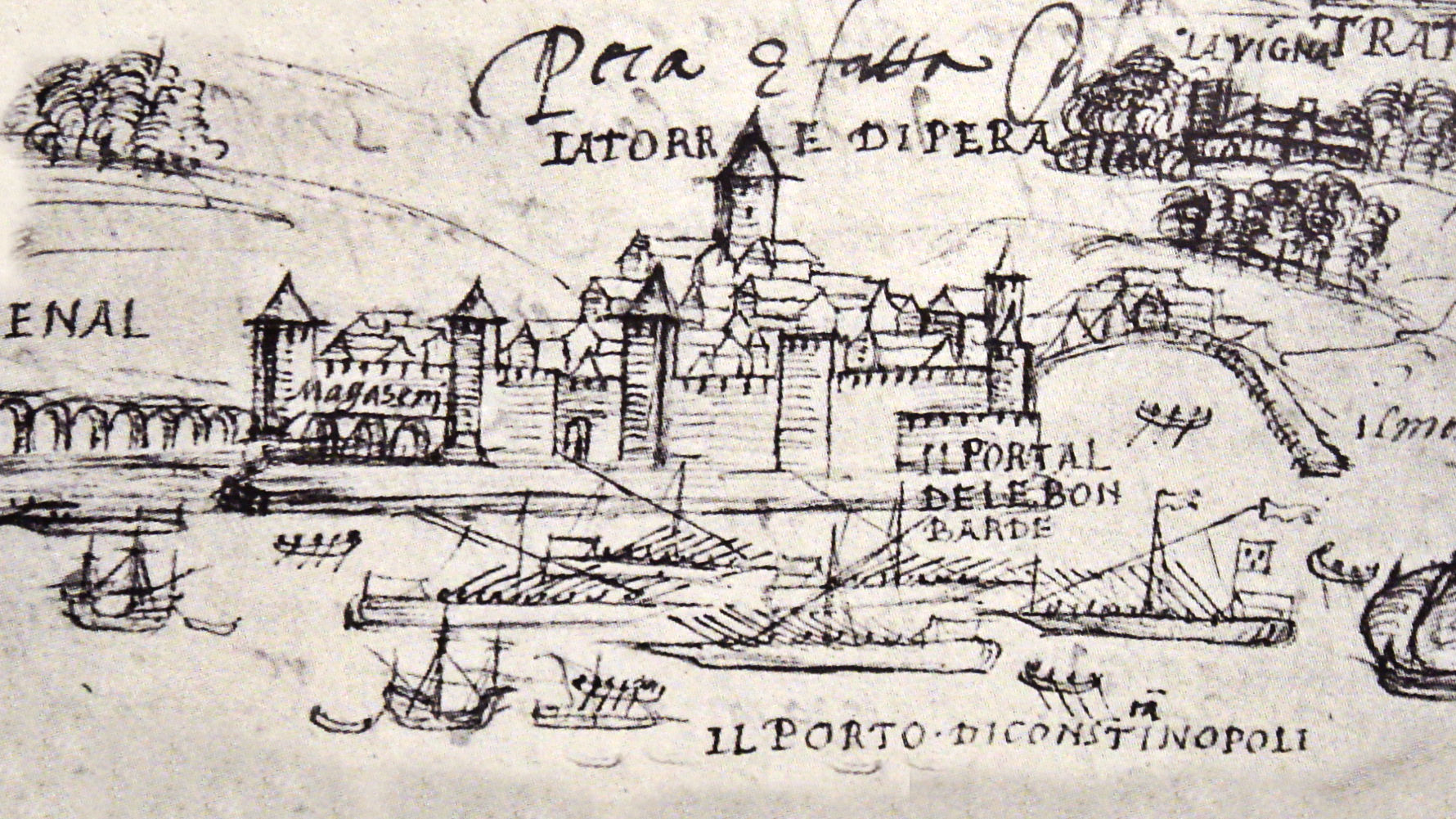
The French galleys of Captain Polin in front of Pera at Constantinople in August 1544, drawn by Jerôme Maurand (detail of the above).

Jérôme Maurand was a 16th-century French priest of Antibes, who accompanied the French officer Captain Polin in conjunction with the Ottoman fleet of Barbarossa in 1544, as a part of the Franco-Ottoman alliance.

Five French galleys under Captain Polin, including the superb Réale, accompanied Barbarossa's fleet, on a diplomatic mission to Suleiman. The French fleet accompanied Barbarossa during his attacks on the west coast of Italy on the way to Istanbul, as he laid waste to the cities of Porto Ercole, Giglio, Talamona, Lipari and took about 6,000 captives, but separated in Sicily from Barbarossa's fleet to continue alone to the Ottoman capital.

Jérôme Maurand wrote a detailed account in Itinéraire d'Antibes à Constantinonple. The fleet of Barbarossa had spent the winter of 1543–1544 in Toulon. The Franco-Ottoman fleet left Marseille on 23 May 1544. They arrived in Constantinople on 10 August 1544 to meet with Suleiman and give him an account of the joint campaign. Polin and Maurand left Constantinople on 9 September 1544, and were back in Toulon on 2 October 1544.

Maurand lamented about the depredation to his Christian coreligionists occasioned by the campaign: "To see so many poor Christians, and especially so many little boys and girls [enslaved] caused a very great pity." He also mentioned "the tears, wailings and cries of these poor Lipariotes, the father regarding his son and the mother her daughter... weeping while leaving their own city in order to be brought into slavery by those dogs who seemed like rapacious wolves amidst timid lambs".
