= Sampiero Corso =

Corsican military leader

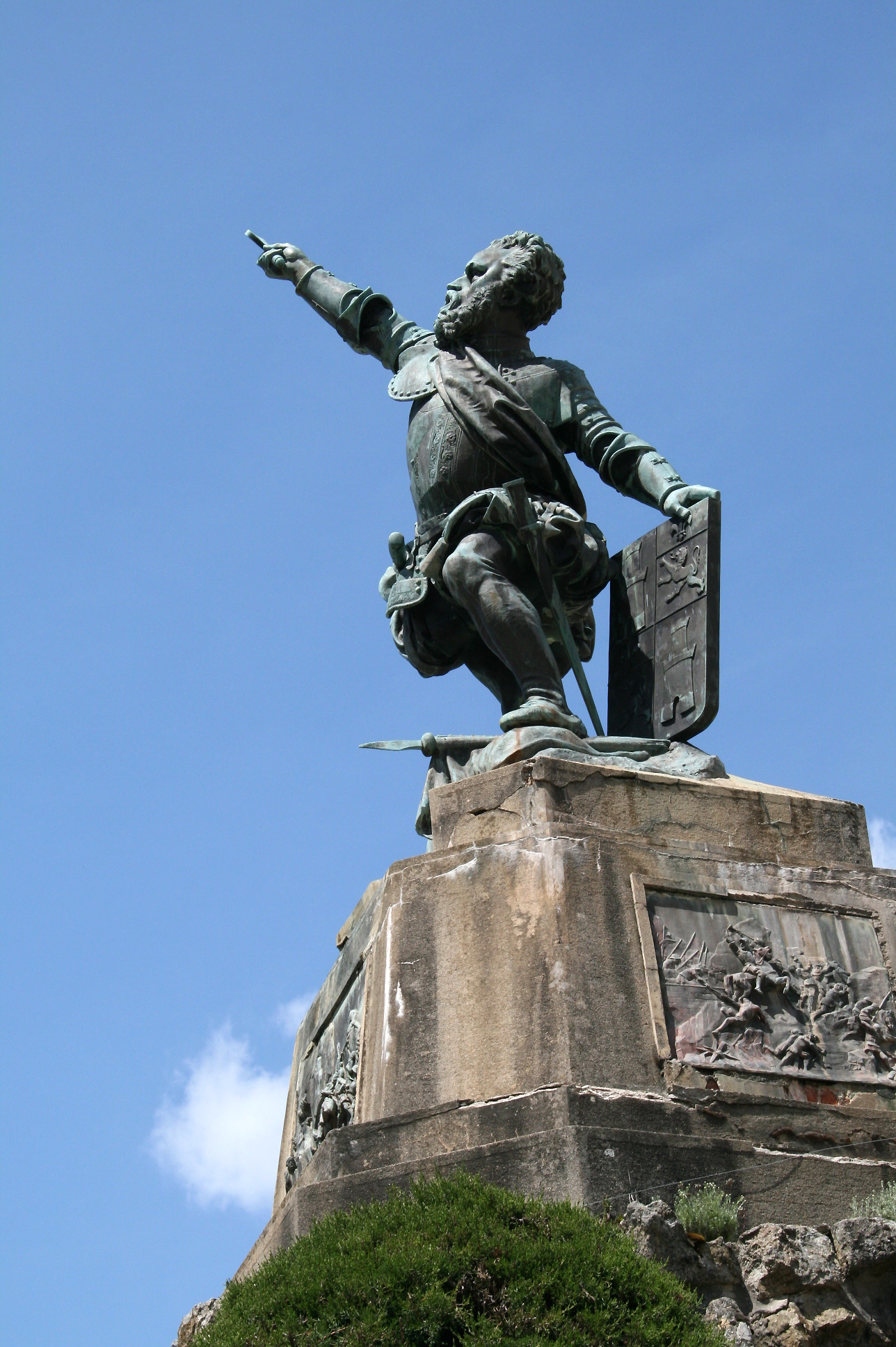
Monument to Sampiero Corso, Bastelica

Sampiero Corso (Corsican: Sampieru Corsu, born Sampiero da Bastelica; 1498 – 17 January 1567) was a Corsican soldier, father of the Marshal of France Alphonse d'Ornano.

== Early career ==
Born in Bastelica as a common man (although his mother was of the lower nobility), he became a condottiero mercenary at age 14, serving Giovanni de' Medici, then Pope Clement VII, and, in 1530, Ippolito de' Medici.

As of 1535, Sampiero's career was tied to the French House of Valois. He fought successfully for King Francis I, alongside the Chevalier de Bayard, in the Italian Wars; in 1547, he acquired the rank of colonel of the mercenary Corsican troops, and, in accordance with usage, became known by his moniker (indicative of his place of origin). The renown ensured his large fortune, and he married the noblewoman Vannina d'Ornano (he was 49, she was just 15).

== First Corsican expedition ==
Sampiero's expertise became most important as France tried to gain the advantage over Habsburg Spain by occupying the strategically located Corsica (also striking the Republic of Genoa, Spain's ally and overlord of the island). Henry II appointed Sampiero leader of a military expedition in the area.

With French and Ottoman support, he landed on the shores of Corsica in 1553, and managed to summon a revolt against the Genoese, defeating the troops of Andrea Doria on several occasions. However, the French became preoccupied by the ties established between the new English Queen Mary Tudor and Emperor Charles V. Sampiero was recalled in 1555, and a five-year armistice was signed the next year between France and Genoa, in Vaucelles. Genoa reoccupied Calvi and Bastia, but the rest of the island remained French - under the rule of Giordano Orsini (Jourdan des Ursins, a member of the Orsini family).

After the French defeat in the battle of St. Quentin of the Habsburg-Valois War (1557), and with the Peace of Cateau Cambrésis (1559), Corsica was relinquished to Genoa. Although the French negotiators had attempted to keep hold of the island, it was returned to ensure possession of Calais, Metz, Toul, and Verdun.

== Later life ==
Sampiero Corso became governor of Aix-en-Provence in 1560, then was appointed French envoy to the Porte. While in Istanbul, he left his wife and children in the mansion he owned in Marseille; the young woman was corrupted by a Genoese spy who had become tutor of their children, Michelangelo Ombrone, and sold off Sampiero's assets before embarking for Genoa. Sampiero was warned, and had the vessel intercepted. He judged his wife on the spot, found her guilty and gave her three days to prepare for her fate. On the day of her execution, she asked to be strangled by Sampiero rather than fall victim to an executioner. A modern legend holds this to have been partial inspiration for William Shakespeare's Othello.

Backed by Catherine de' Medici, Sampiero returned to Corsica in 1564, leading a group of Corsicans and Gascon mercenaries. Although initially victorious in several skirmishes, he was soon left without French support, as well as faced with the indifference of the population and the suspicion of the Corsican nobility (dominant families fled to Genoa). The Ornano family placed 2,000 ducats on his head, while Genoa offered 4,000.

He was ambushed and decapitated by rival Corsican mercenaries - a group which included three of his wife's cousins. His head was exposed in Ajaccio.

== In culture ==
The Corsican condottiero is the main character in the opera Sampiero Corso by Marseille-born Henri Tomasi, who was of Corsican descent.
