= Jean Cavenac de la Vigne =

French diplomat

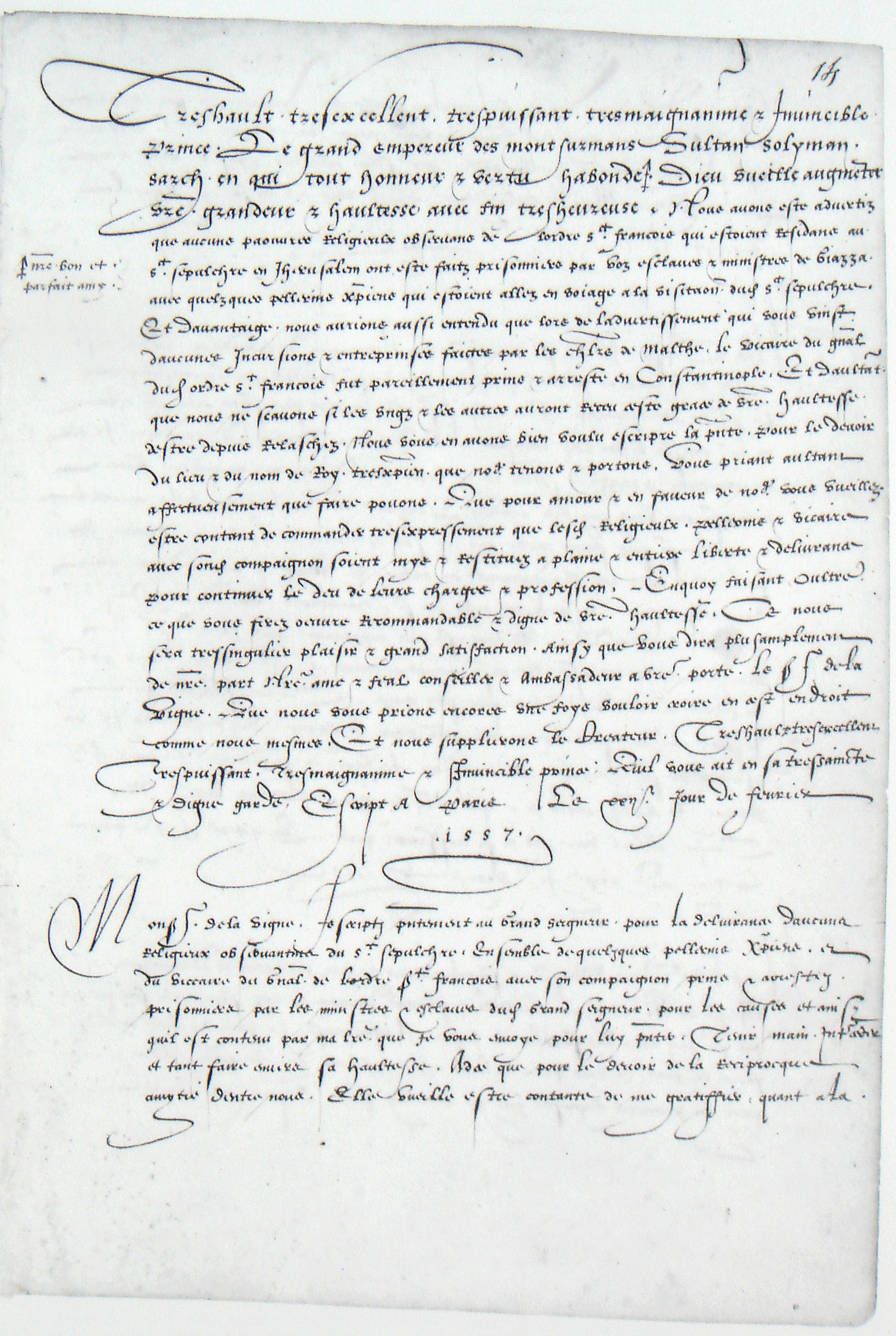
Letter from Henry II of France to Suleiman the Magnificent and ambassador Jean Cavenac de la Vigne, dated 22 February 1557.

Jean Cavenac de la Vigne, seigneur d'Auvilliers, was French Ambassador to the Ottoman Empire from 1556 to 1566. He was the successor of Michel de Codignac, who had returned to Europe in 1558, passing through Venice in July 1558, and betrayed the French cause by entering in the service of Philip II of Spain.

De la Vigne was sent to the Ottoman Empire by Henri II of France, with the objective of getting help against the Spanish troops of the Duke of Alva in Italy as part of the long-standing Franco-Ottoman alliance, when, concomitantly France was facing the Spanish troops of Philip II of Spain in the north on the border of Flanders. France could only hope for progress in Italy if it were to receive Ottoman help. De la Vigne lobbied for an Ottoman naval intervention in 1557.

Henry was hopeful of Ottoman help, as in the past his military actions against the Habsburgs had relieve pressure on Suleiman during his campaigns in Persia and in Hungary, and Henry had always refused to join anti-Ottoman coalitions. The Ottomans however refused to send their fleet to Italy that year to support the French, partly because of the Ottomans feeling offense about the previous Truce of Vaucelles which Henry II had signed without informing them, and his lack of response to several of Suleiman's letters. The Ottomans were also afraid of the increased power of the French under Henry II, and did not wish to see France occupy the whole of Italy, next door to the Ottoman Empire.

In 1558, Suleiman finally communicated through de la Vigne his agreement to help Henry II, and he started to prepare an armada. He also committed to send an army in the direction of Hungary and Germany if Henry also committed not to make truces or agreements on his side. The French king however preferred an Ottoman offensive against Naples in Italy, through the Albanian port of Valona, and wished to obtain financial help to the level of 2 million ducats from the Ottomans. In May, Suleiman communicated that he would send an armada, which left Istanbul in April 1558. In June, the armada sacked Sorrento and took 3,000 captives, but otherwise did little, and was delayed from joining a French fleet in Corsica, possibly due to the failure of the commander Dragut to honour Suleiman's orders. Suleiman apologized in a letter to Henry at the end of the year 1558. As the Ottoman refused to lend the 2 million ducats to France, and Henry failed in the Battle of Saint-Quentin and Battle of Gravelines, the Peace of Cateau-Cambrésis was finally signed.

De la Vigne had a reputation of being rather outspoken and impolitic, and Ghiselin de Busbecq, ambassador of Ferdinand to the Porte, commented that de la Vigne's freedom of speech as an ambassador was "wild and frightfull".

== See also ==
- Franco-Ottoman alliance

== Sources ==
- Setton, Kenneth M. (1984a). The Papacy and the Levant (1204–1571), Volume IV: The Sixteenth Century from Julius III to Pius V. Vol. 4. Philadelphia: The American Philosophical Society. ISBN 0-87169-162-0.

Diplomatic posts
Preceded by Michel de Codignac	French Ambassador to the Ottoman Empire; 1556–1566	Succeeded by Guillaume de Grandchamp de Grantrie
