= Antoine Escalin des Aimars =

French ambassador

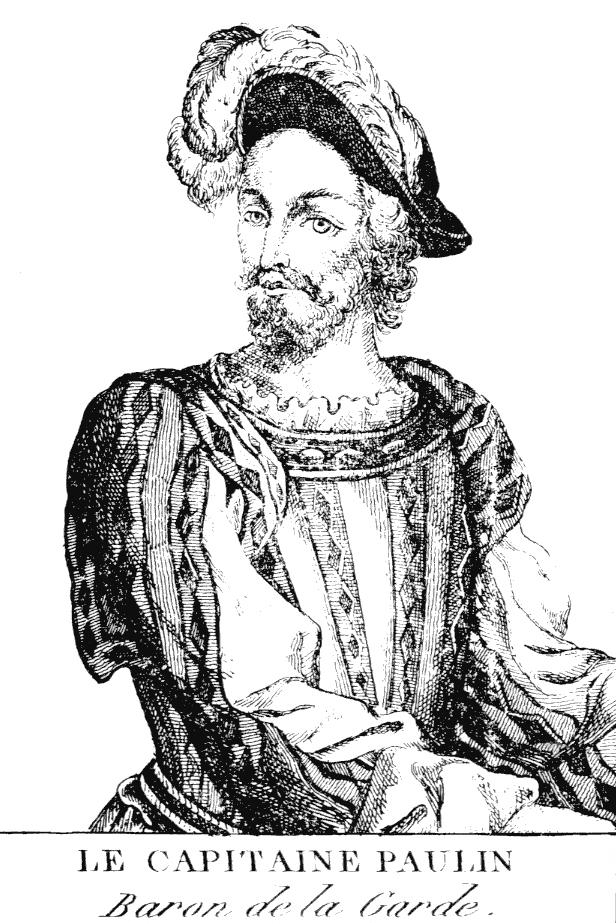
- Antoine Escalin des Aimars (1498?-1578)
- Nickname: Captain Polin
- Born: 1516; La Garde-Adhémar, France
- Died: 1578 (aged 61–62) La Garde-Adhémar, France
- Allegiance: France
- Branch: French Navy
- Service years: c.1535-1578
- Rank: General of the galleys
- Conflicts: French invasion of the Isle of Wight (1545); Invasion of Corsica (1553)

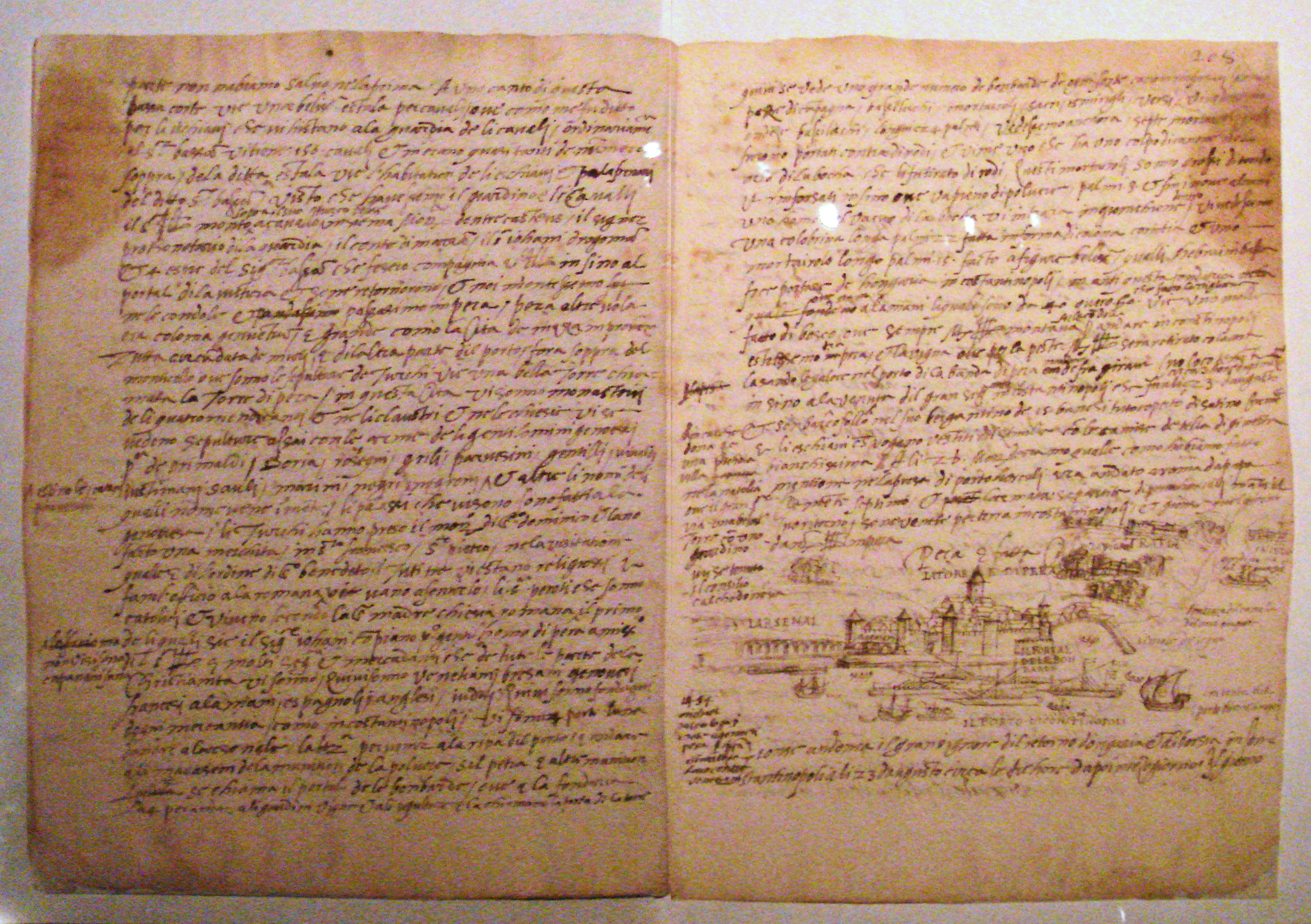
Jerôme Maurand, priest of Antibes, accompanied Polin and the Ottoman fleet in 1543-44, and wrote a detailed account in Itinéraire d'Antibes à Constantinonple, 1544.

Antoine Escalin des Aimars (1516–1578), also known as Captain Polin or Captain Paulin, later Baron de La Garde, was French ambassador to the Ottoman Empire from 1541 to 1547, and "Général des Galères" ("General of the galleys") from 1544.

== Italian Wars ==
Polin was noticed by Guillaume du Bellay as a valuable officer of the French Army during the Italian Wars in the Piedmont.

== Ottoman alliance ==
Polin succeeded ambassador Antoine de Rincon (1538–1541) in Constantinople. In early 1542, Polin successfully negotiated the details of a Franco-Ottoman alliance for the Italian War of 1542–1546, with the Ottoman Empire promising to send 27,500 troops against the territories of the Spanish king Ferdinand, as well as 110 galleys against Charles, while France promised to attack Flanders, harass the coasts of Spain with a naval force, and send 40 galleys to assist the Turks for operations in the Levant. Polin tried to convince Venice to join the alliance, but in vain.

The execution of the alliance would most notably lead to the Franco-Ottoman Siege of Nice in 1543. In July 1543, Polin sailed on board the Ottoman fleet of Barbarossa to the Île Saint-Honorat in the Lérins Islands off Cannes on 5 July 1543, only to find very little ready for the offensive on the French side. Polin went to see king Francis I of France to obtain troops, which led to the Siege of Nice in August 1543. Polin supervised the wintering of the Ottomans at Toulon.

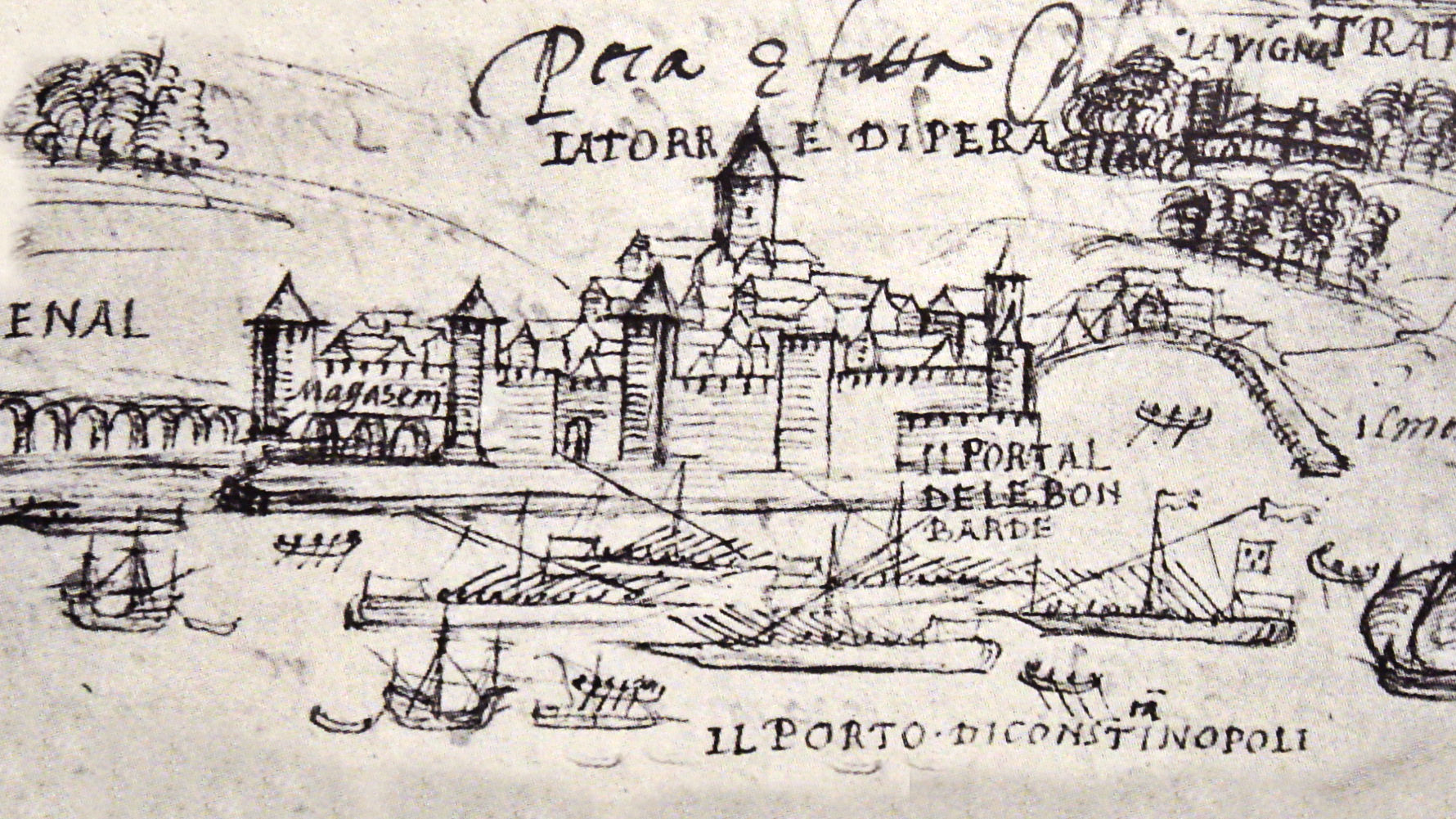
The five French galleys of Captain Polin in front of Pera at Constantinople in August 1544, drawn by Jérôme Maurand (detail of the above).

Then, in 1544, five French galleys under Polin, including the superb Réale, accompanied Barbarossa's fleet, on a diplomatic mission to Suleiman. The French fleet accompanied Barbarossa during his attacks on the west coast of Italy on the way to Constantinople, as he laid waste to the cities of Porto Ercole, Giglio, Talamona, Lipari and took about 6,000 captives, but separated in Sicily from Barbarossa's fleet to continue alone to the Ottoman capital. Jerôme Maurand, a priest of Antibes who accompanied Polin and the Ottoman fleet in 1544, wrote a detailed account in Itinéraire d'Antibes à Constantinople. They arrived in Constantinople on 10 August 1544 to meet with Suleiman and give him an account of the campaign. Polin was back to Toulon on 2 October 1544.

== Massacre of the Waldensians ==
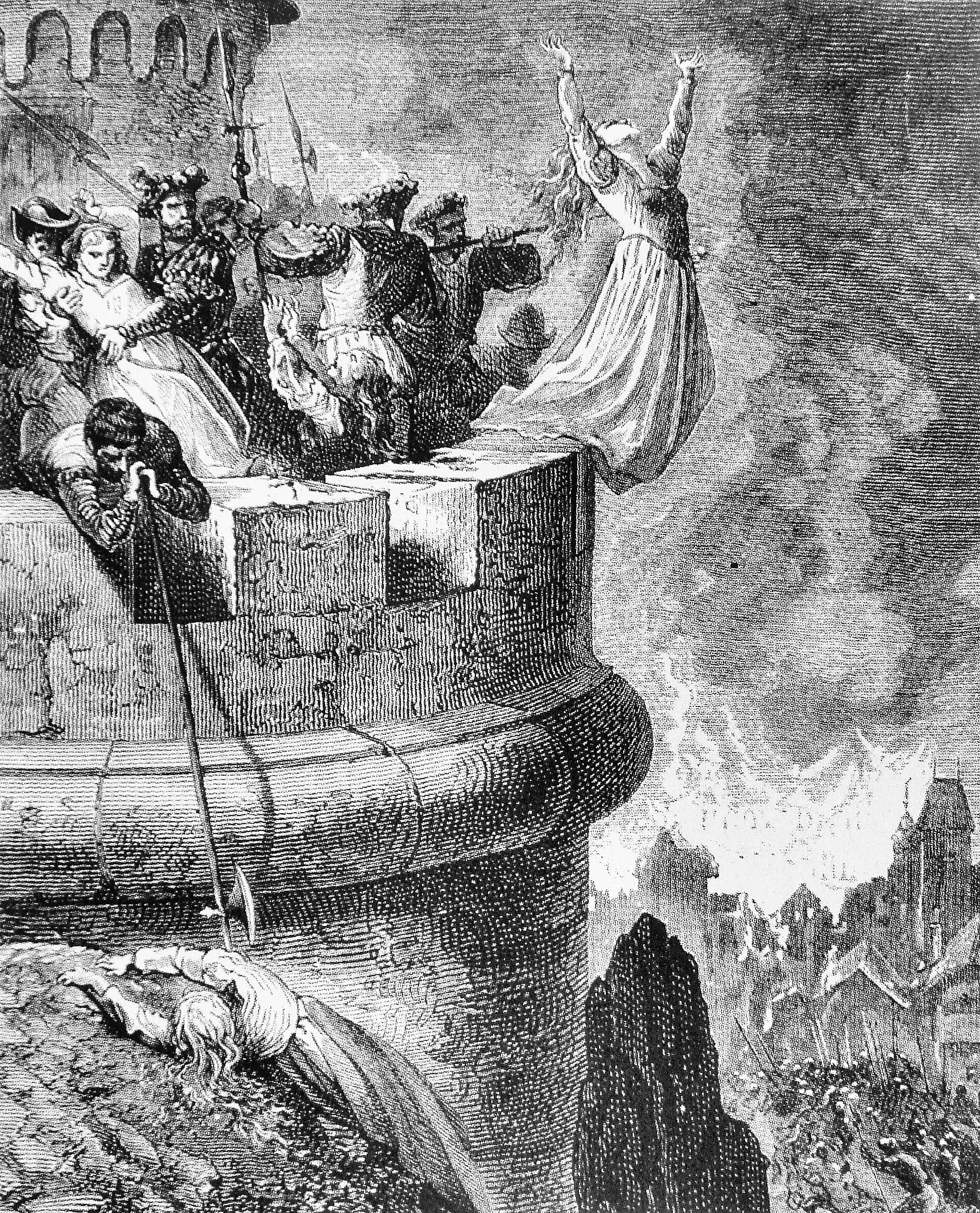
Massacre of the Waldensians of Mérindol in 1545.

In 1545, Polin was on his way to fight against the English in the area of Boulogne. While in Marseilles in 1545, Polin was involved as a leader in the massacre of the Protestant Waldensians (Vaudois).

Outside the Piedmont the Waldenses joined the local Protestant churches in Bohemia, France and Germany. After they came out of hiding and were reported for sedition, on 1 January 1545 the French king Francis I issued the "Arrêt de Mérindol" and armed a crusade against the Waldensians of Provence. The leaders in the 1545 massacres were Jean Maynier d'Oppède, First President of the parlement of Provence, and Antoine Escalin des Aimars who was returning from the Italian Wars with 2,000 veterans, the Bandes de Piémont. Deaths ranged from hundreds to thousands, depending on the estimates, and several villages were devastated.

== England campaign ==
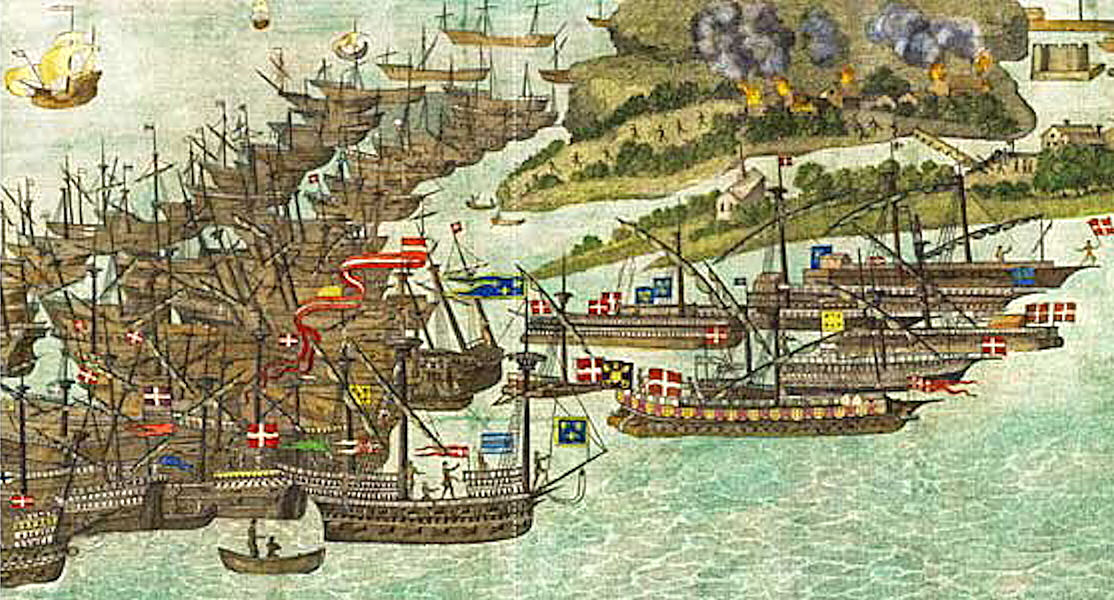
Polin participated to the French invasion of the Isle of Wight in 1545.

After these deeds, Polin participated in the French invasion of the Isle of Wight that same year.

He was succeeded as ambassador to the Porte by Gabriel de Luetz in 1547.

In 1553, Polin again cooperated with the Ottoman fleet in the Mediterranean, in the events surrounding the Invasion of Corsica (1553).

In 1571, Polin was involved in the conflict against the Huguenots in La Rochelle as a commander in the French Navy fleet which was making a blockade of the city, together with Filippo di Piero Strozzi.

== See also ==
- French Ambassador to the Ottoman Empire

== Notes ==
Diplomatic posts
Preceded by Antoine de Rincon	French Ambassador to the Ottoman Empire; 1541–1547	Succeeded by Gabriel, comte de Luetz
