= Jean Chesneau =

French writer

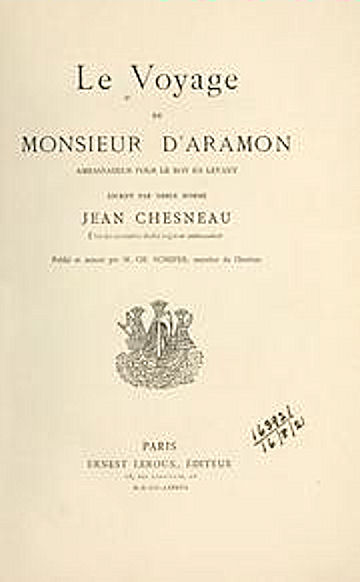
Le Voyage de Monsieur d'Aramon dans le Levant by Jean Chesneau.

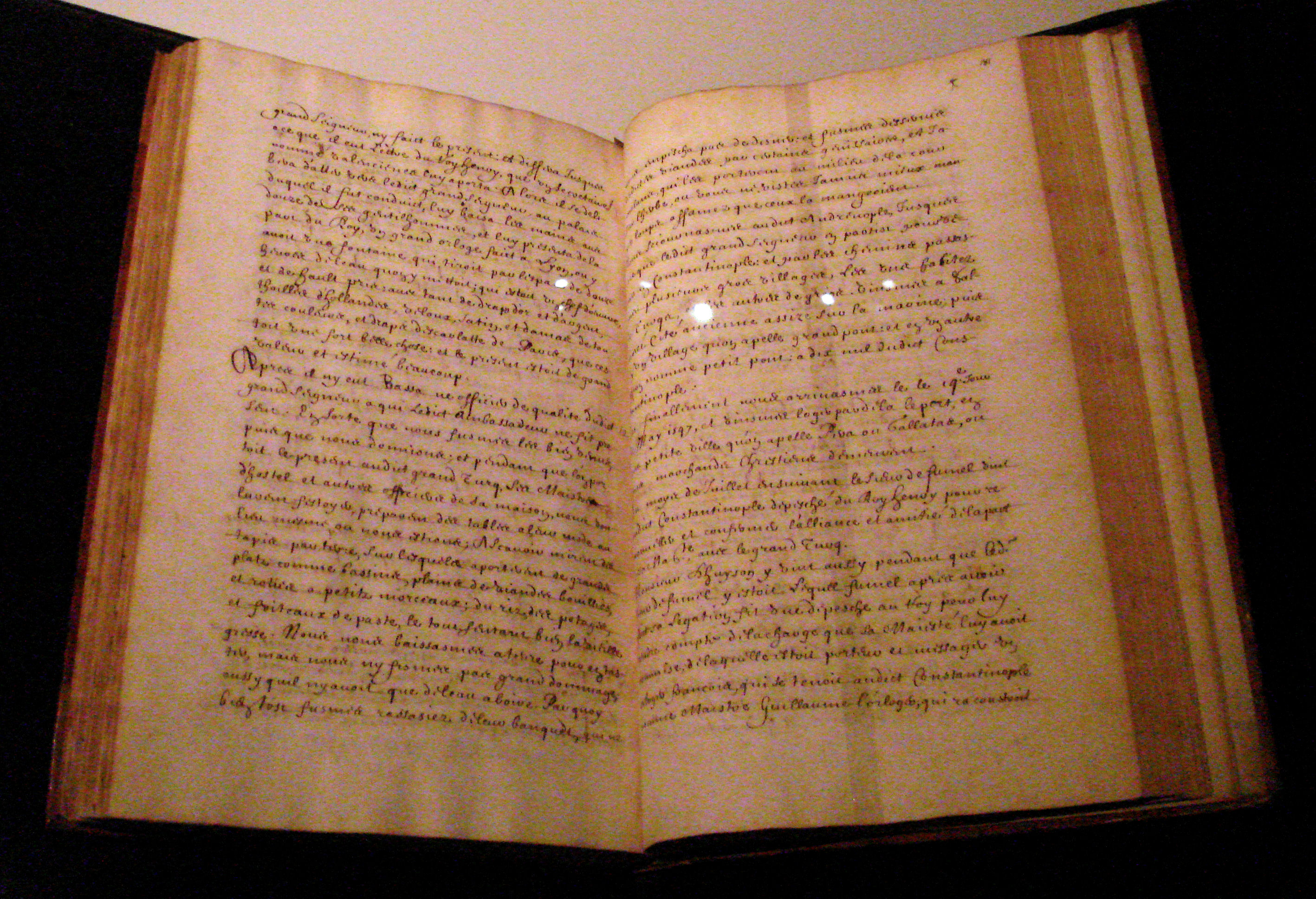
Voyage de Paris à Constantinople by Jean Chesneau, 1547.

Jean Chesneau was a French writer and secretary to the French ambassador to the Ottoman Empire Gabriel de Luetz d'Aramon.

Together with d'Aramon and a second secretary Jacques Gassut, he accompanied Suleiman the Magnificent in 1547 on his conquest of Persia in the Ottoman-Safavid War (1532–1555). Jean Chesneau recorded that d'Aramon gave advice to the Sultan on some aspects of the campaign. Chesneau wrote Le Voyage de Monsieur d'Aramon dans le Levant, an interesting account of the travels of Gabriel de Luetz.
