= List of ambassadors of France to Turkey =

France's Ambassador to Turkey
- Coat of Arms of French Republic

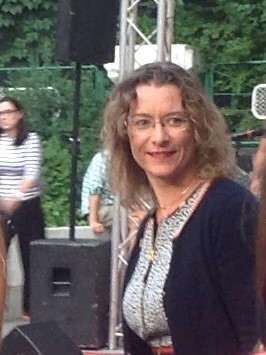
- Incumbent; Isabelle Dumont since 16 August 2023
- Ministry for Europe and Foreign Affairs; French Embassy, Ankara
- Style: Her Excellency
- Inaugural holder: Jean de La Forêt
- Formation: 1535
- Website: https://tr.ambafrance.org

The French Ambassador to Turkey is the successor post to the French Ambassador to the Ottoman Empire.

== History ==
The embassy, which was built from 1933 to 1939 and designed by architect Albert Laprade, is located in Ankara, in the Kavaklıdere neighborhood of district of Çankaya. The Palais de France in Istanbul is the seat of the former embassy until its transfer to Ankara in 1922. Today, it remains the residence of the ambassador when they are in Istanbul.

The land where the current embassy is located includes a plot proposed by the Turkish government in 1928, in response to a promise made to foreign countries in 1923 to find a site to host future diplomatic representations in Ankara and no longer in Istanbul. The plot offered to the French, too small, was enlarged the following year thanks to the purchase of adjacent land which belonged to the writer and diplomat Yakup Kadri. The building began to accommodate embassy staff in 1937.

The Salon des Fêtes, used for receptions in winter, features, among other things, Louis XV-style furniture and a tapestry by Charles Le Brun which depicts a meeting between Louis XIV and Philip IV of Spain.

== List of ambassadors ==
Ambassadors of the Third, Fourth and Fifth Republic to the Republic of Turkey. Embassy transferred to Ankara.

From	Until	Ambassadors
1925	1926	Albert Sarraut
1926	1928	Nosky Daeschner
1928	1933	Charles Pineton de Chambrun
1933	1936	Albert Kammerer
1936	1938	Henri Ponsot
1938	1940	René Massigli
1944	1948	Gaston Maugras
1948	1952	Jean Lescuyer
1952	1955	Jacques Tarbé de Saint-Hardouin
1955	1957	Jean-Paul Garnier
1957	1963	Henry Spitzmüller
1963	1965	Bernard Hardion
1965	1970	Gontran Begoügne de Juniac
1970	1973	Arnaud Wapler
1973	1977	Roger Vaurs
1977	1981	Emile Cazimajou
1981	1985	Fernand Rouillon
1985	1988	Philippe Louët
1988	1991	Eric Rouleau
1991	1996	François Dopffer
1996	1999	Daniel Lequertier
2000	2004	Jean-Claude Cousseran
2004	2007	Paul Poudade
2007	2011	Bernard Émié
2011	2015	Laurent Bili
2015	2020	Charles Fries
2020	2023	Hervé Magro
2023	–	Isabelle Dumont
