= France–Turkey relations =

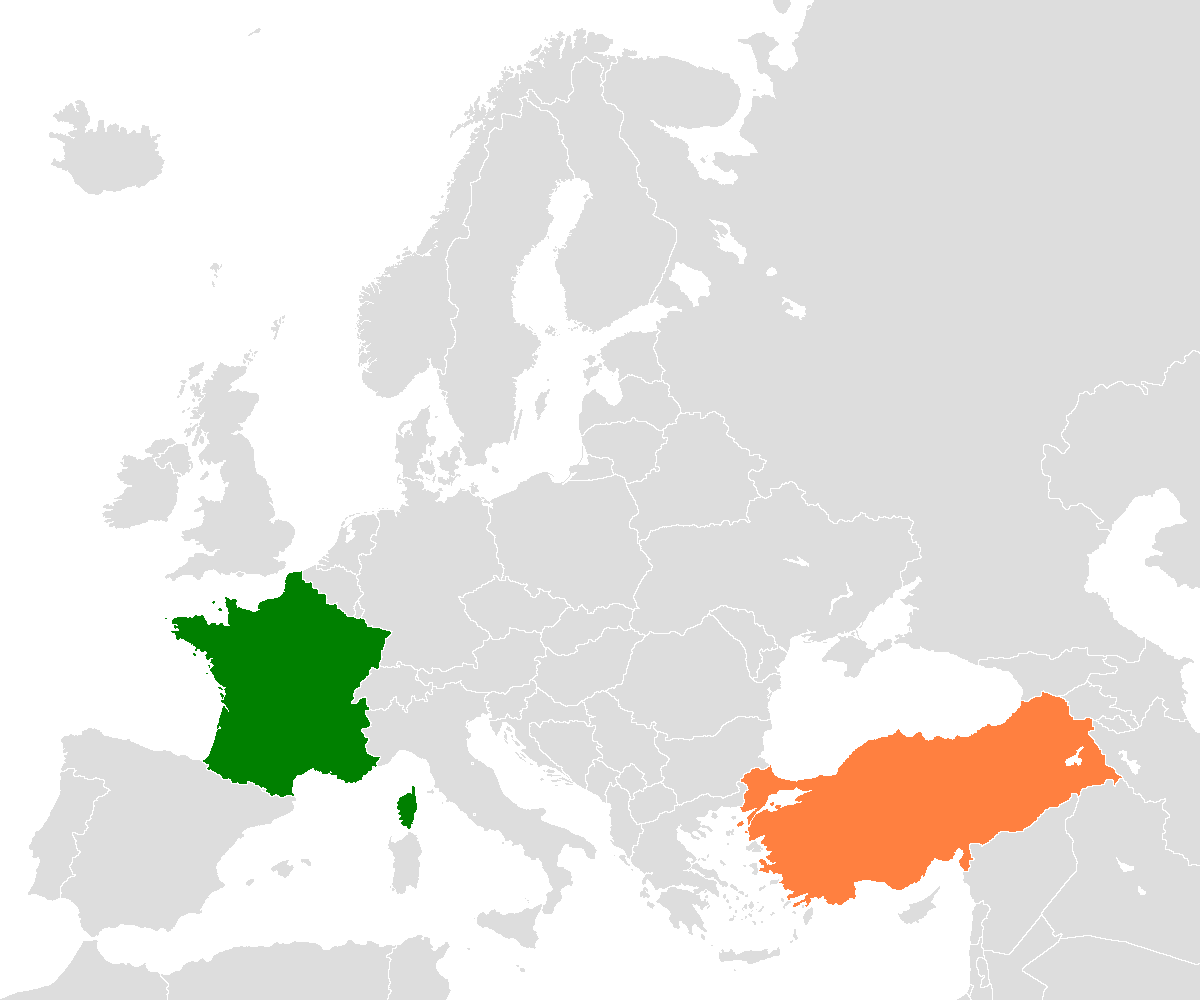
- France: Turkey

Diplomatic mission
- Embassy of France, Ankara: Embassy of Turkey, Paris

France–Turkey relations cover a long period from the 16th century to the present, starting with the alliance established between Francis I and Suleiman the Magnificent. Relations remained essentially friendly during a period of nearly three centuries, with the resumption of intense contacts from the reign of Louis XIV. Relations became more complex with the French campaign in Egypt and Syria by Napoleon I in 1798, and the dawn of the modern era. Both countries are members of the Council of Europe and NATO. France is an EU member and Turkey is an EU candidate. France opposes Turkey's accession negotiations to the EU, although negotiations have now been suspended.

During the Algerian War, Turkey under the administration of Celal Bayar and Adnan Menderes supported France and voted in favor of France during UN votes between 1954 and 1960 against the Algerian insurrection.

== History ==
=== Battle of Nicopolis ===
Execution of Christian prisoners by Bayezid I after the Battle of Nicopolis in 1396. Froissart's Chronicles

In 1396, Jean Le Maingre, the Marshal of France, took part in the joint French–Hungarian crusade against the Ottoman Turks, which suffered a heavy defeat on September 28 at the Battle of Nicopolis. He was taken hostage by the Ottoman sultan Bayezid I, but, unlike many of his companions, escaped execution and was eventually ransomed. From France, it was said about 5,000 knights and squires joined, and were accompanied by 6,000 archers and foot soldiers drawn from the best volunteer and mercenary companies; totalling some 11,000 men. Philip of Artois, Count of Eu, the Constable of France, was captured in the battle, and subsequently died in captivity.

=== Franco-Ottoman alliance ===
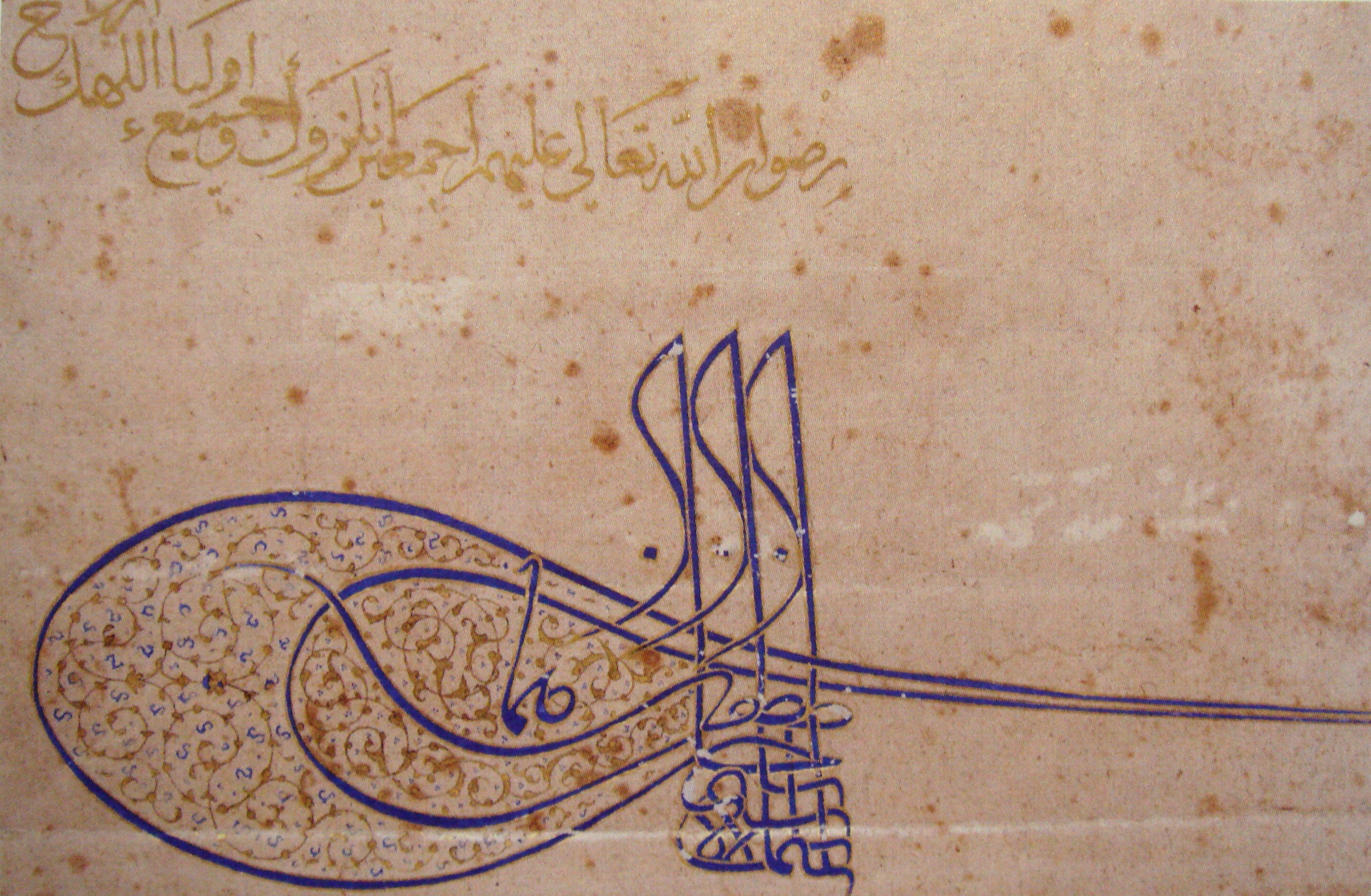
Letter of Suleiman the Magnificent to Francis I of France regarding the protection of Christians in his states. September 1528. Archives Nationales, Paris, France.

The Franco-Ottoman alliance, also Franco-Turkish alliance, was an alliance established in 1536 between the king of France Francis I and the Turkish sultan of the Ottoman Empire Suleiman the Magnificent. The objective for Francis I was to find an ally against the Habsburgs (see French–Habsburg rivalry and Ottoman–Habsburg wars). King Francis was imprisoned in Madrid when the first efforts at establishing an alliance were made. A first French mission to Suleiman seems to have been sent right after the Battle of Pavia by the mother of Francis I Louise de Savoie, but the mission was lost on its way in Bosnia.

In December 1525 a second mission was sent, led by John Frangipani, which managed to reach Constantinople, the Ottoman capital, with secret letters asking for the deliverance of king Francis I and an attack on the Habsburg. Frangipani returned with an answer from Suleiman, on 6 February 1526:. Top-level strategic relations between the Ottoman Empire and the Kingdom of France started during the reigns of Süleyman the Magnificent and the Valois king Francis I in the first quarter of the 16th century, at a time when the French king was in critical need of alliance and assistance from the Ottoman Sultan. The contacts were further enhanced, especially in a commercial viewpoint, with the capitulations granted by the sultan in 1535 and starting with Jean de la Forest in that year, France had an ambassadorial representative in Turkey ever since. These privileged trading conditions were to mark the relations, both in commercial terms and beyond, till their abolition with the Treaty of Lausanne in 1923, and to gradually increasing disadvantage and decreasing leverage for the Ottomans.

=== Relations during the Ottoman decline ===
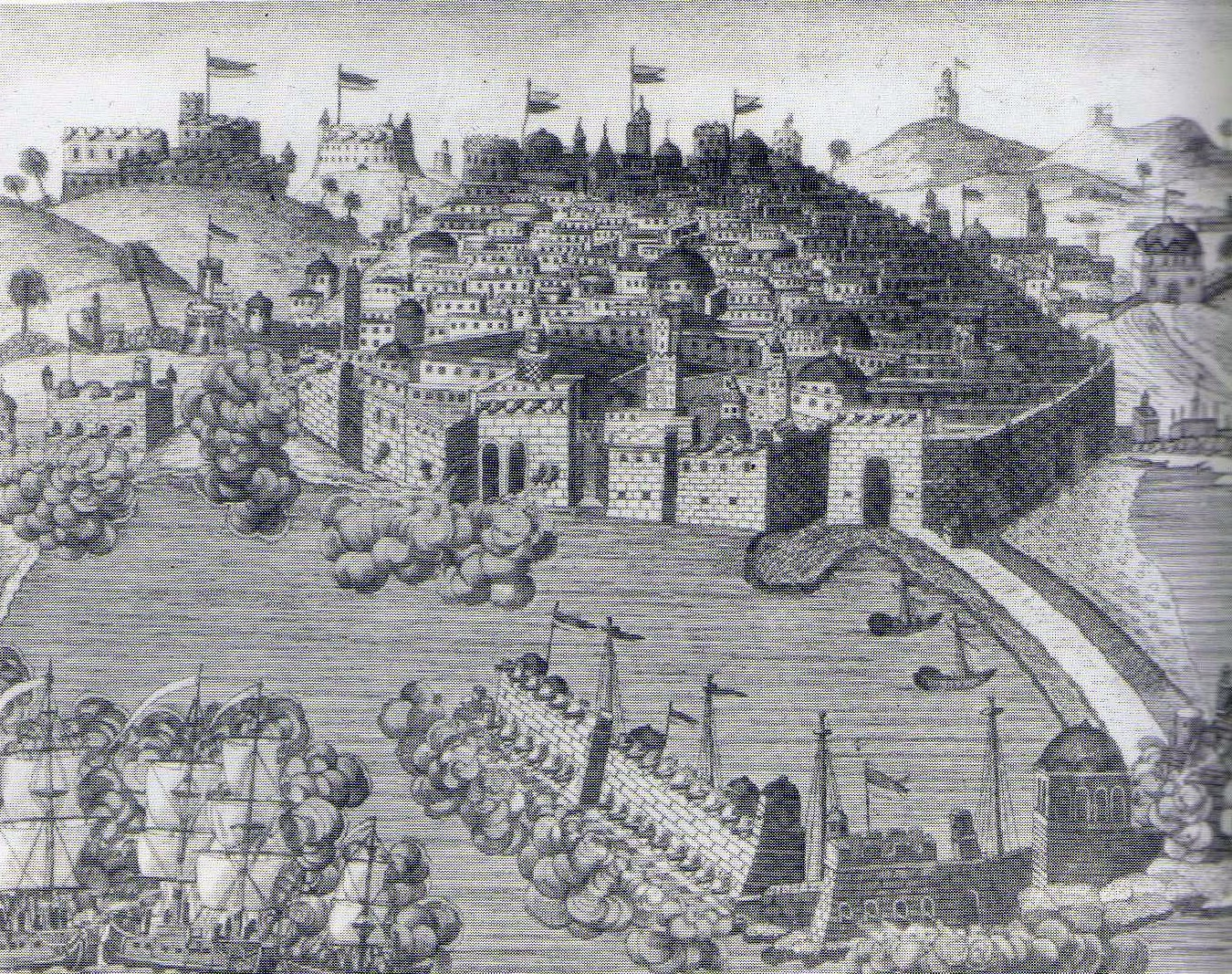
Bombardment of Algiers by the fleet of Admiral Duquesne in 1682

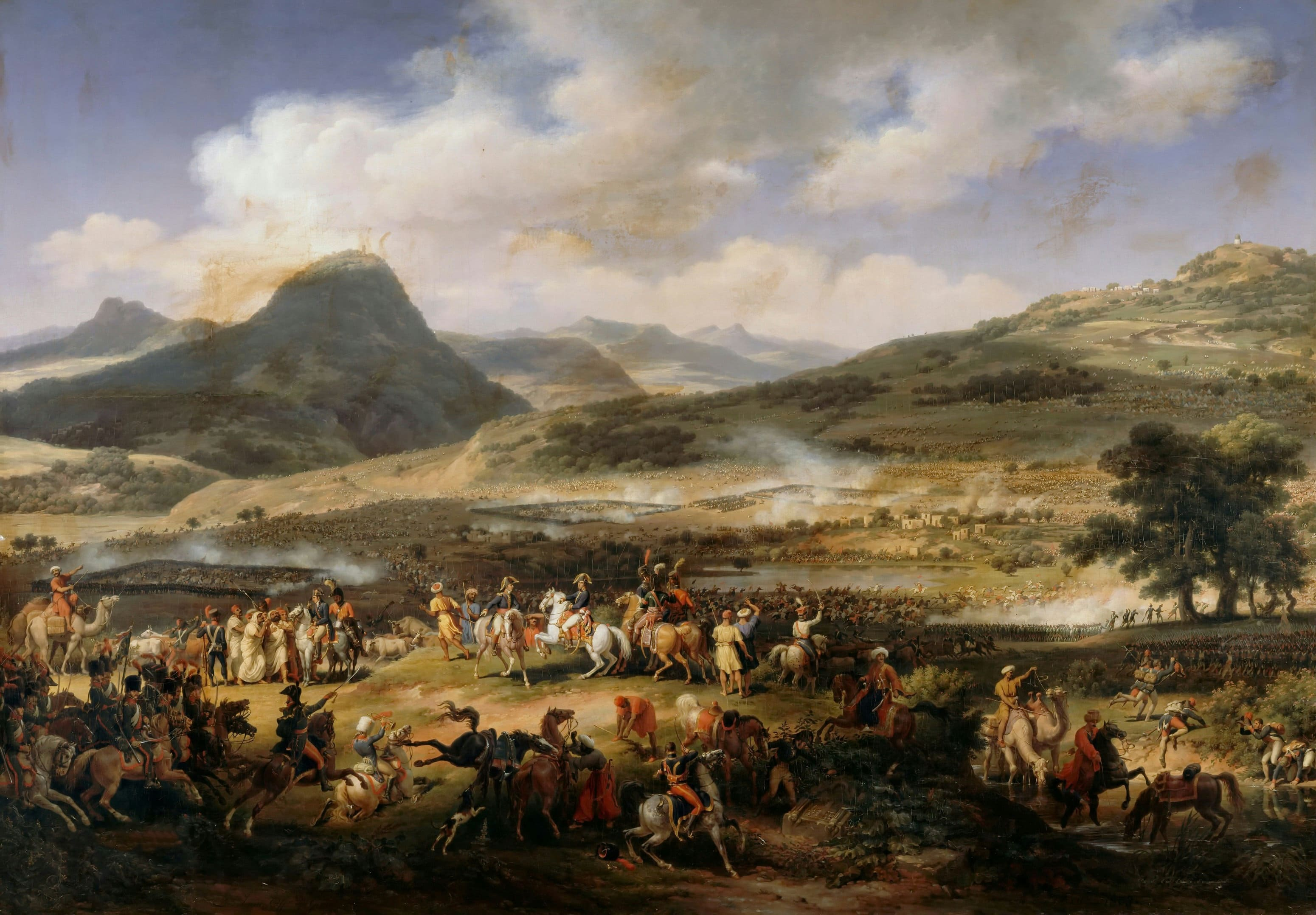
The Battle of Mount Tabor by Louis-François Lejeune. French campaign in Syria against the Ottoman forces in 1799

In 1663, the Ottomans launched a disastrous invasion of the Habsburg Monarchy, ending at the Battle of St. Gotthard. The battle was won by the Christians, chiefly through the attack of 6,000 French troops led by La Feuillade and Coligny.

In 1669, during the siege of Candia, the French prince Francois de Beaufort led the French troops defending the Venetian-ruled Candia (modern Heraklion, Crete) against the Ottoman Turks.

The Barbary slave trade and Ottoman corsairs originating from Ottoman Algeria were a major problem throughout the centuries, leading to regular punitive expeditions by France (1661, 1665, 1682, 1683, 1688). French admiral Abraham Duquesne fought the Barbary corsairs in 1681 and bombarded Algiers between 1682 and 1683, to help Christian captives.

The intensity of the contacts is demonstrated by the opening of up to forty French consulates, often focused on trade relations, in Ottoman lands in the 18th century. The first Turkish representative invested with an extended period mission to the Parisian court was Yirmisekiz Mehmed Çelebi, in the beginning of the 18th century, at a time when the Ottoman Empire sought to grasp the reasons for its loss of prominence as compared to the European powers.

The two countries have been in a state of war three times. The first time was during Napoleon's Egypt-Syria campaign in 1798–1800. The second time was during the First World War, especially in Gallipoli campaigns where the French forces were comparatively less heavily invested than British and ANZAC troops, and the last time between 1919 and 1921 in the phase of the Turkish War of Independence, in what is generally termed as the Cilicia War, where the conflicts were often localized and sporadic in character, and the diplomatic pourparlers were being pursued during the very occurrence of the clashes. With the Accord of Ankara signed on 20 October 1921 between the two countries, France became the first western power to abandon the claims that had been instituted by the Treaty of Sèvres and effectively recognize the new Turkish governments based in Ankara.

=== French support for Kurdish rebellions against Turkey (1921-1946) ===
After World War I and France's loss in the Cilicia War, the French started supporting Kurdish independence movements in Turkey. In 1925, during the Sheikh Said Rebellion, the rebels rejected French aid and sought help from the Soviets instead. As such, the French allowed the Turkish Army to use railways in French Syria, which were used to crush the rebellion. However, the French High Commissioner later let Kurdish refugees into their colonies. Later, a "dissatisfied Kurdish chief" expressed himself as such to the French government: "If the [Turkish] government had only punished the guilty after the affair of Sheikh Said, the Kurds would have made their submission, but the men of Ankara had innocents massacred; it is from now on between them and us a fight to the death".

In 1926, the French began the "Terrier Plan" a set of unofficial initiatives devised by a French officer, Captain Pierre Terrier, in Syria to favor the Kurds and advance French policy in the Levant. France welcomed Kurdish refugees as a means of putting diplomatic pressure on Turkey. The plan included the nomination of Kurdish functionaries, the constitution of a Kurdish-composed French battalion, the creation of Kurdish language courses and the publication of the Kurdish journal Hawar. Turkey warned against France's collaboration with an "enemy" of Ankara, but the Terrier Plan continued, despite Turkish protests.

In the following years, up to 1927, the Turkish government complained to French authorities about Kurdish trans-borders incursions. In 1927, Xoybûn was established, with the support of France, and the Ararat rebellion was headquartered in French Syria. France secretly gave protection to Kurdish rebels and also allowed Armenians to settle along the Turkish/Syrian frontier. They also secretly supplied the rebels with weapons, ammunition and funds.

İsmet İnönü authored a report in 1935 summarized as such by historian Murat Ülgül: "He maintained that the French attempted to occupy Turkey’s southeastern cities such as Mardin, Urfa, Antep and Maras to control Syria in the pre-war period, but they failed; yet, this region was still important in their mind. To maintain French influence in the region, Inonu holds, its agents would not hesitate to use Kurdish tribes, as well as border smugglers, to prove that existing borders are uncontrollable. Against this policy, Inonu recommended using Arab tribes against France and expressed that seeing the French as an enemy must be a permanent feeling among the [Turkish] settlers in Turkey’s southeast".

In 1938, the French swiftly encouraged and supported the Dersim Rebellion, in order to prevent Turkey from annexing Hatay from France. French officials in Syria conducted activities promising funds, weapons and ammunition to Kurdish tribal leaders to incite the rebellion, but, ultimately, no material support was given. Nevertheless, the French decided to let Kurdish rebels and refugees settle in French Syria, again as a diplomatic "tool" against Turkey.

== Expansion of French language in Turkey ==
French is the language associated with the Tanzimat period of reforms (1839–1876) in Turkish history. Apart from those involved in politics and diplomacy, also the authors and their immediate public during the various successive stages of modern Turkish literature overwhelmingly had the French language as their primary Western reference. Its preponderance as the first foreign language acquired by members of Turkey's educated classes lasted well into the Republic of Turkey, in fact until quite recently. Currently, English is the overwhelmingly popular choice amongst Turks learning a foreign language, having supplanted French long ago. Although there are fewer Turks today who learn French as their sole foreign language, its knowledge is still very well represented among the intelligentsia and as such, highly valued, often considered a privilege by those who have command of it.

According to a 2006 European Commission report, 3% of Turkish residents are able to carry on a conversation in French. The recently growing immigrant communities of Turkish origin, at all levels of the society, in France, Belgium, Switzerland and Canada also helped strengthen the position of the knowledge of French in Turkey, both in qualitative and quantitative terms. In Canada, the vast majority of Turkish-Canadians are settled in anglophone areas, limiting their exposure to the French language.

== Accession of Turkey to the European Union ==
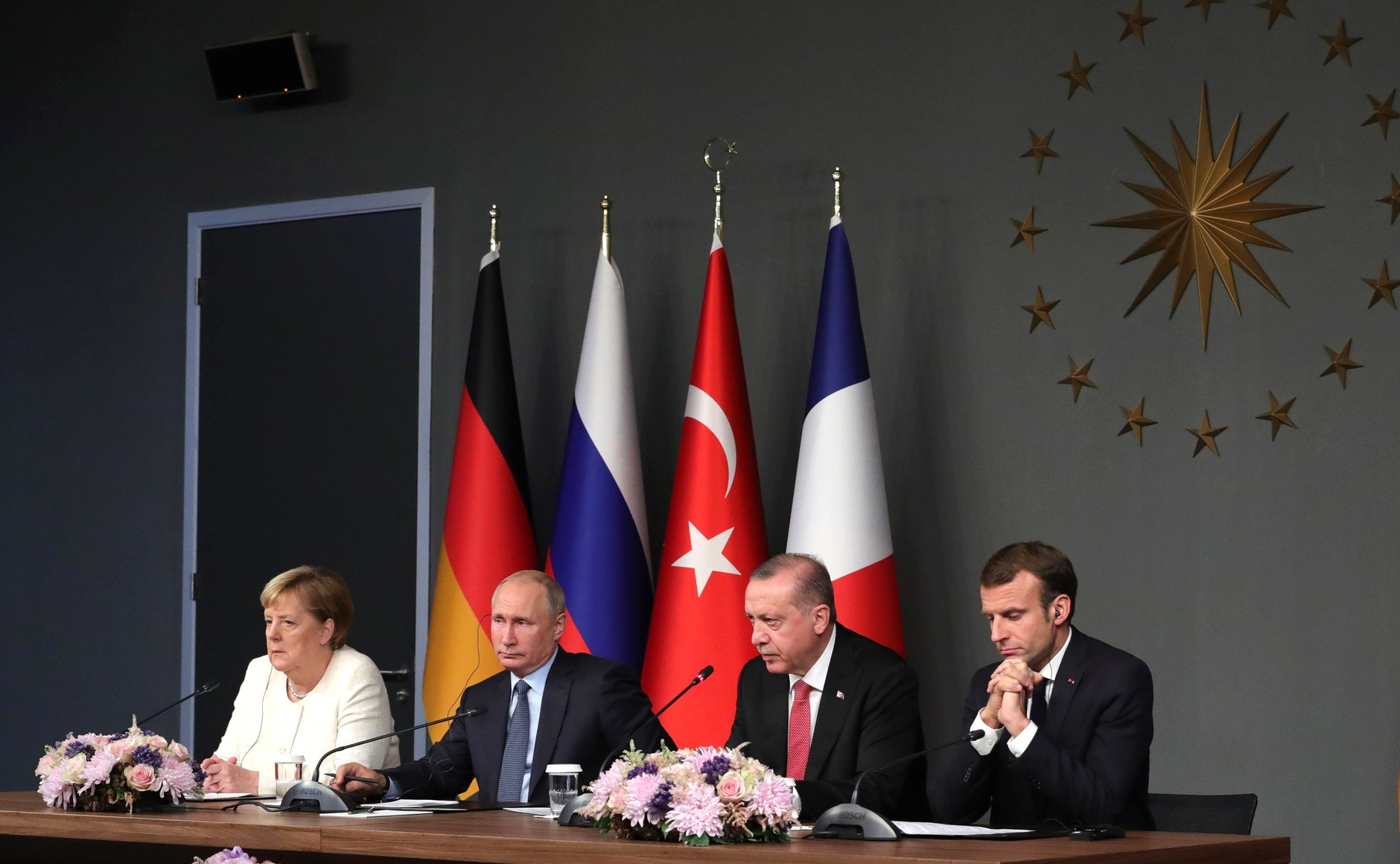
French President Emmanuel Macron, Turkish President Recep Tayyip Erdoğan, Russian President Vladimir Putin and German Chancellor Angela Merkel when giving a press conference as part of 2018 Syria summit in Istanbul, Turkey.

In 2004, President Jacques Chirac said that France will hold a referendum on Turkey's entry into the EU when the issue arises, and any further EU enlargement will also be subject to a popular vote.

In 2007, French President Nicolas Sarkozy stated that "Turkey has no place inside the European Union." Sarkozy continued, "I want to say that Europe must give itself borders, that not all countries have a vocation to become members of Europe, beginning with Turkey which has no place inside the European Union."

France's position on Turkey's EU accession was unchanged a decade later. In 2018, French President Emmanuel Macron stated that “ As far as the relationship with the European Union is concerned, it is clear that recent developments and choices do not allow any progression of the process in which we are engaged”.

== Trade ==
With the open market conditions (for industrial products) set off with the EU-Turkey Customs Union starting in 1996, trade figures between France and Turkey were boosted by two and a half fold during the ensuing five years, reaching 5.8 billion Dollars in 2000, and with France registering a clear surplus. Turkey became France's third largest trade partner outside the EU and France became Turkey's third largest partner overall. The loss of impetus caused by the late 2000 and early 2001 financial breakdowns in Turkey were already compensated for in 2002.

Until recently, Turkey still attracted a modest share in global foreign direct investment trends, although France and her household brand names were markedly present in this share since the 1960s. French FDI stepped up as of the second half of the 1980s in a move checked temporarily by the same financial crises of 2000–2001. In the period 1980–2000, France was cumulatively the first foreign investor in Turkey, investing 5.6 billion Dollars in value. In 2003, according to the Turkish Treasury, there were 270 French enterprises in Turkey, corresponding to significant market shares in automotive, construction —especially for the production of electricity—, cement, insurance, distribution and pharmaceutical industries.

== Armenian genocide ==
Following approval of a French bill on 22 December 2011 that would make denial of the Armenian genocide a crime punishable by one-year prison sentence and a fine of €45,000 (about $61,387), the Turkish government froze bilateral relations and political meetings with France. Turkey also cancelled permission for French warships to dock and French military planes to land in Turkey, and every French military plane would have to request permission for every flight in order to use Turkish airspace. The Turkish government had previously warned the French government that passage of the bill in the senate, whereupon it would become law, would irreparably damage bilateral relations.

Because Turkey cut off access to its airspace and sea lanes to French forces, France has had to deal with a military logistics problem, and found it difficult to get its troops to and from Afghanistan, since any other route was deemed both risky and "too costly", according to the French Defence Minister Gérard Longuet.

On 28 February 2012, France's Constitutional Council ruled that the new law is unconstitutional and invalidated the law. However, France had in 1990 passed the Gayssot Act which made it illegal to question the existence of crimes against humanity, intended to be directed at the Holocaust.

== Murders of PKK activists in Paris ==
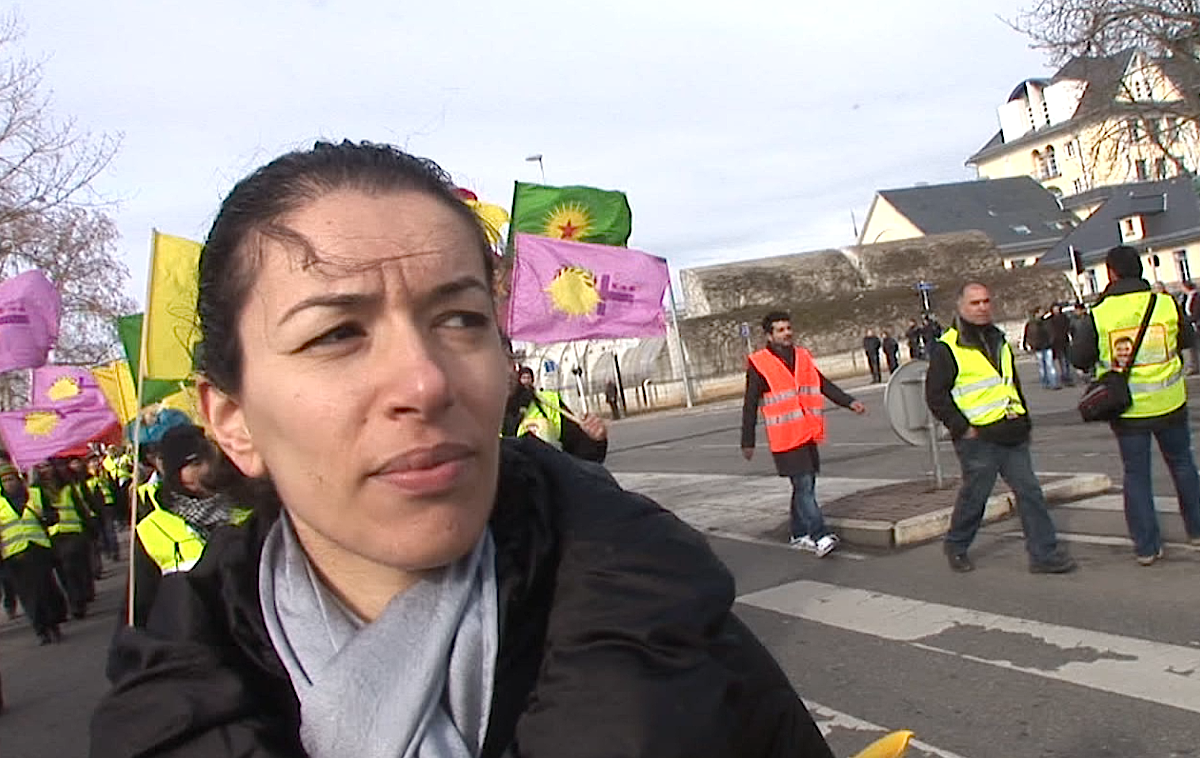
Kurdish activist Fidan Doğan was assassinated in Paris in 2013.

Turkey's National Intelligence Organization (MIT) was blamed for the 2013 murders of three Kurdish activists in Paris.

== Operation Sea Guardian ==
On June 17, 2020, France accused Turkey that Turkish ships harassed a French warship which tried to check a Turkish vessel, which was suspected of smuggling arms to Libya, and that the Turkish navy is using their NATO call signals while accompanying Turkish vessels suspected of breaking the UN arms embargo in Libya. According to French officials, when the French ship tried to check the vessel, the Turkish vessel switched off its tracking system, masked its ID number and refused to say where it was going while the Turkish frigates flashed their radar lights three times against the French warship, suggesting a missile strike was imminent. On the other hand, Turkish officials, denied that the warship was harassed and claimed that the French warship did not establish communications with the Turkish vessel during the incident. On June 18, NATO said that it will investigate the incident.

== Erdoğan-Macron controversies ==
In November 2019, French President Emmanuel Macron criticized the Turkish invasion of north-eastern Syria, describing the offensive as contributing to "brain death" in NATO by undermining coordination between allies. Turkish President Recep Tayyip Erdoğan replied by claiming Macron had a shallow understanding of NATO, adding that Macron may be "brain dead".

In October 2020, after Samuel Paty was beheaded by an Islamist terrorist for showing caricatures of Mohammed during a lecture about freedom of expression, the two presidents clashed again in their comments about the murder. Macron referred to the murder as indicative of broader 'Islamic separatism' which the French state would combat, while Erdoğan responded publicly by suggesting that Macron required mental health treatment. Following this comment, France recalled its ambassador from Turkey. Erdoğan then called on Turkish citizens to boycott French products. The French satirical magazine Charlie Hebdo subsequently published a cover depicting a debauched Erdoğan, which elicited threats from the Turkish government of "legal, diplomatic actions" concerning its publication.

In 2021, the French President said in an interview that Turkey will attempt to interfere in the 2022 French presidential election by “playing on public opinion.” He added that Turkey distorted his comments on Islam and spread lies from media controlled by Turkey and Qatar. Turkey rejected the claims about the election interference.

== Resident diplomatic missions ==
- France has an embassy in Ankara and a consulate-general in Istanbul.
- Turkey has an embassy in Paris and consulates-general in Bordeaux, Lyon, Marseille, Nantes and Strasbourg.
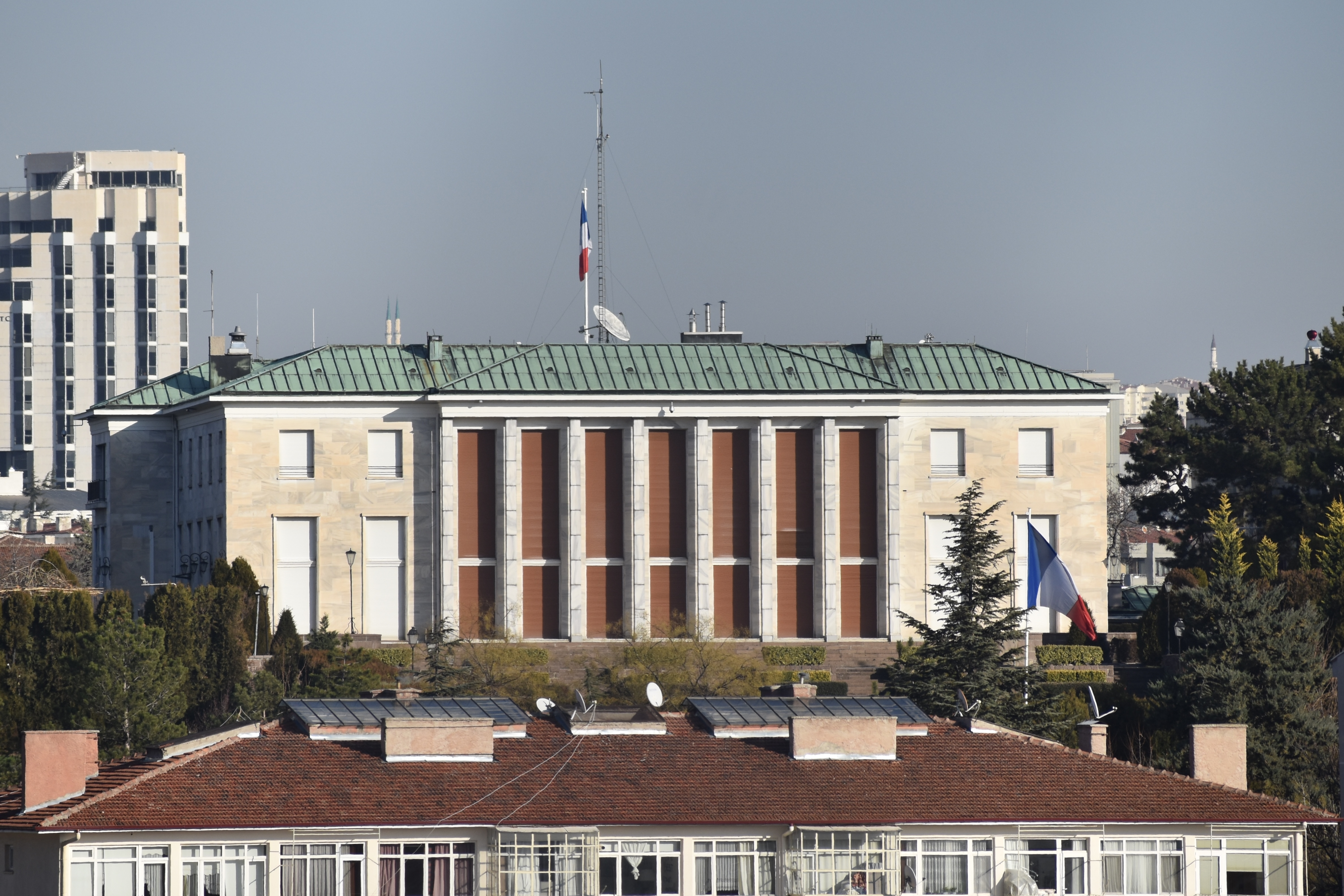
Embassy of France in Ankara

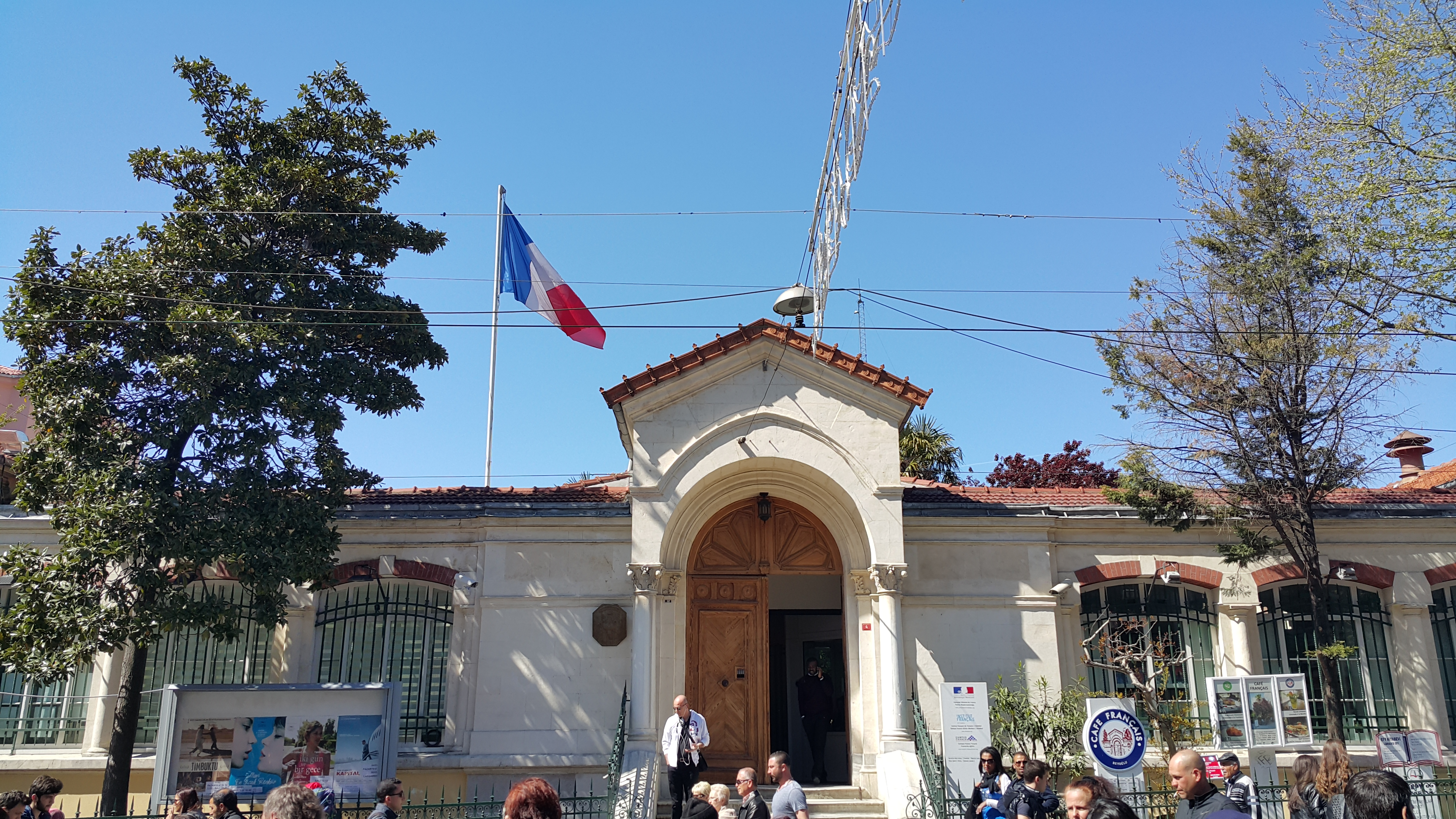
Consulate-General of France in Istanbul
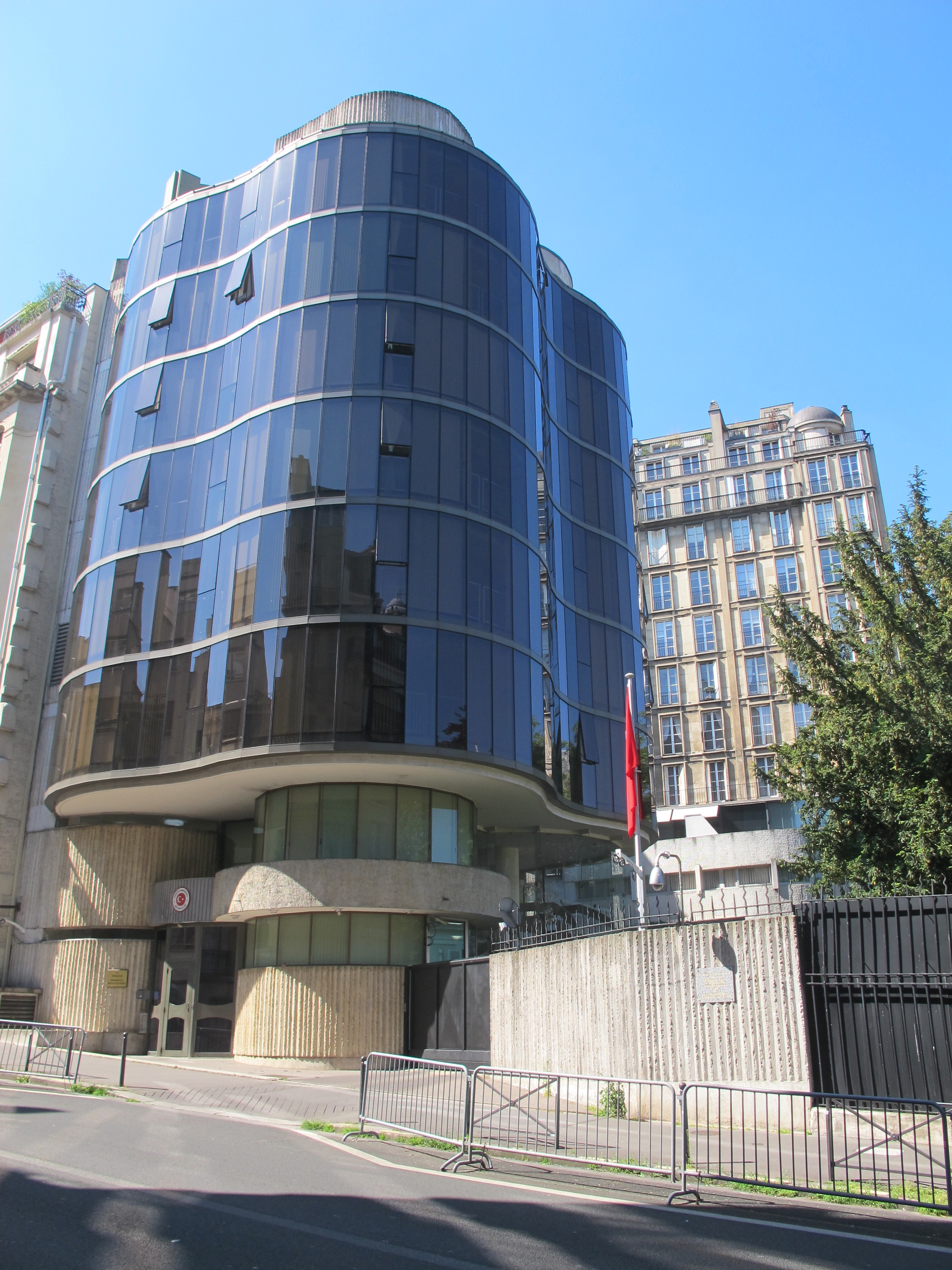
Embassy of Turkey in Paris

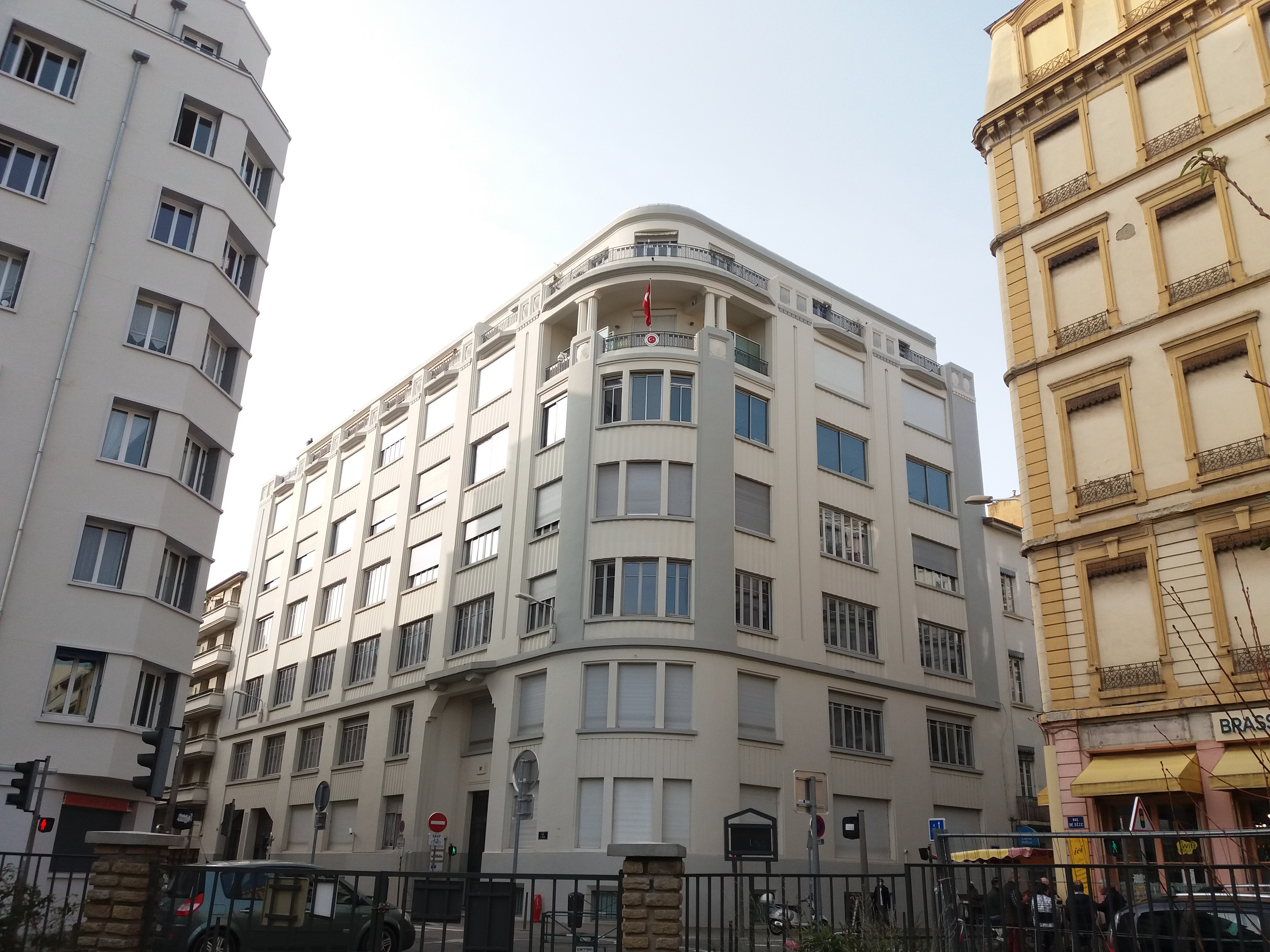
Consulate-General of Turkey in Lyon

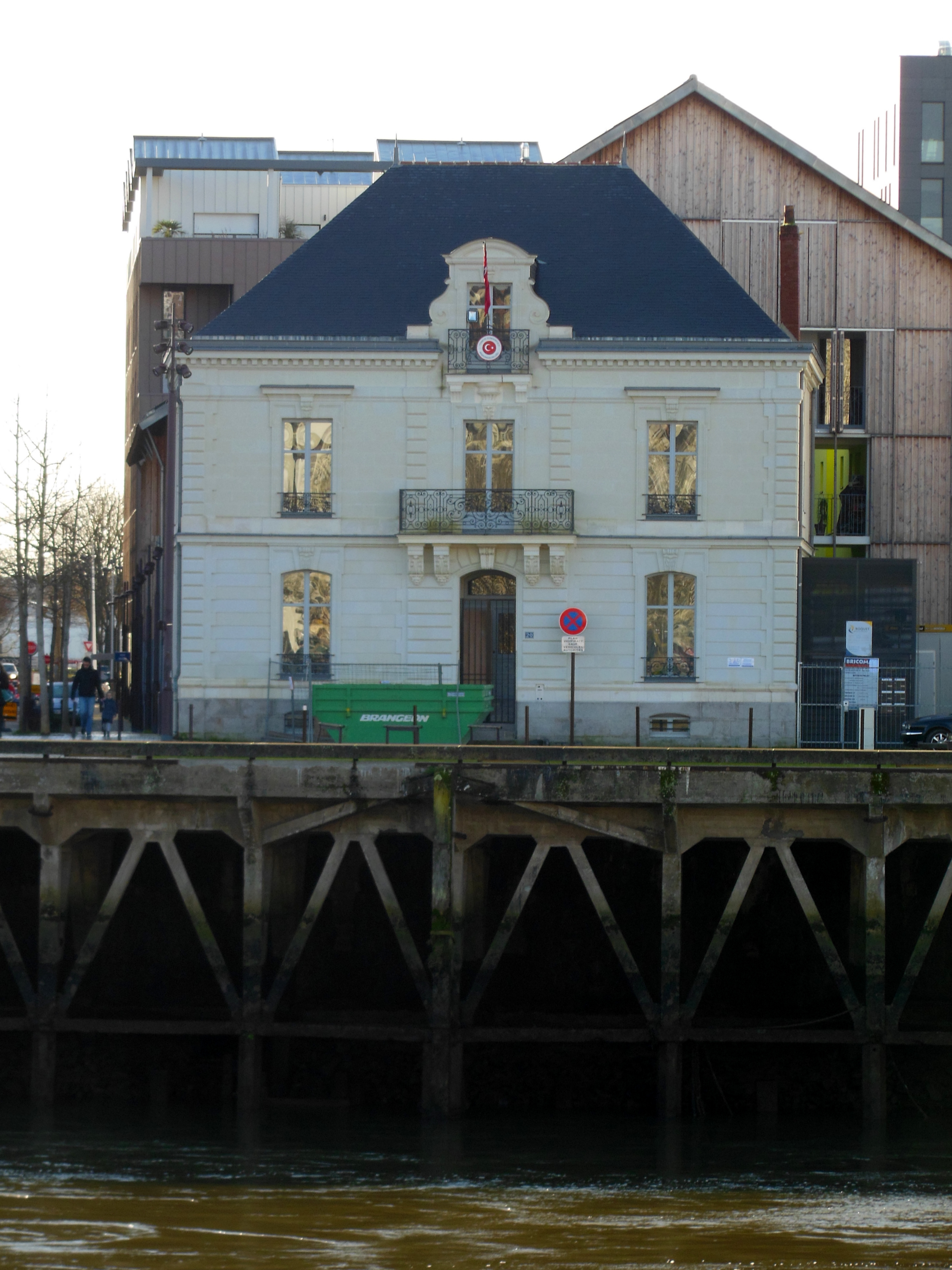
Consulate-General of Turkey in Nantes

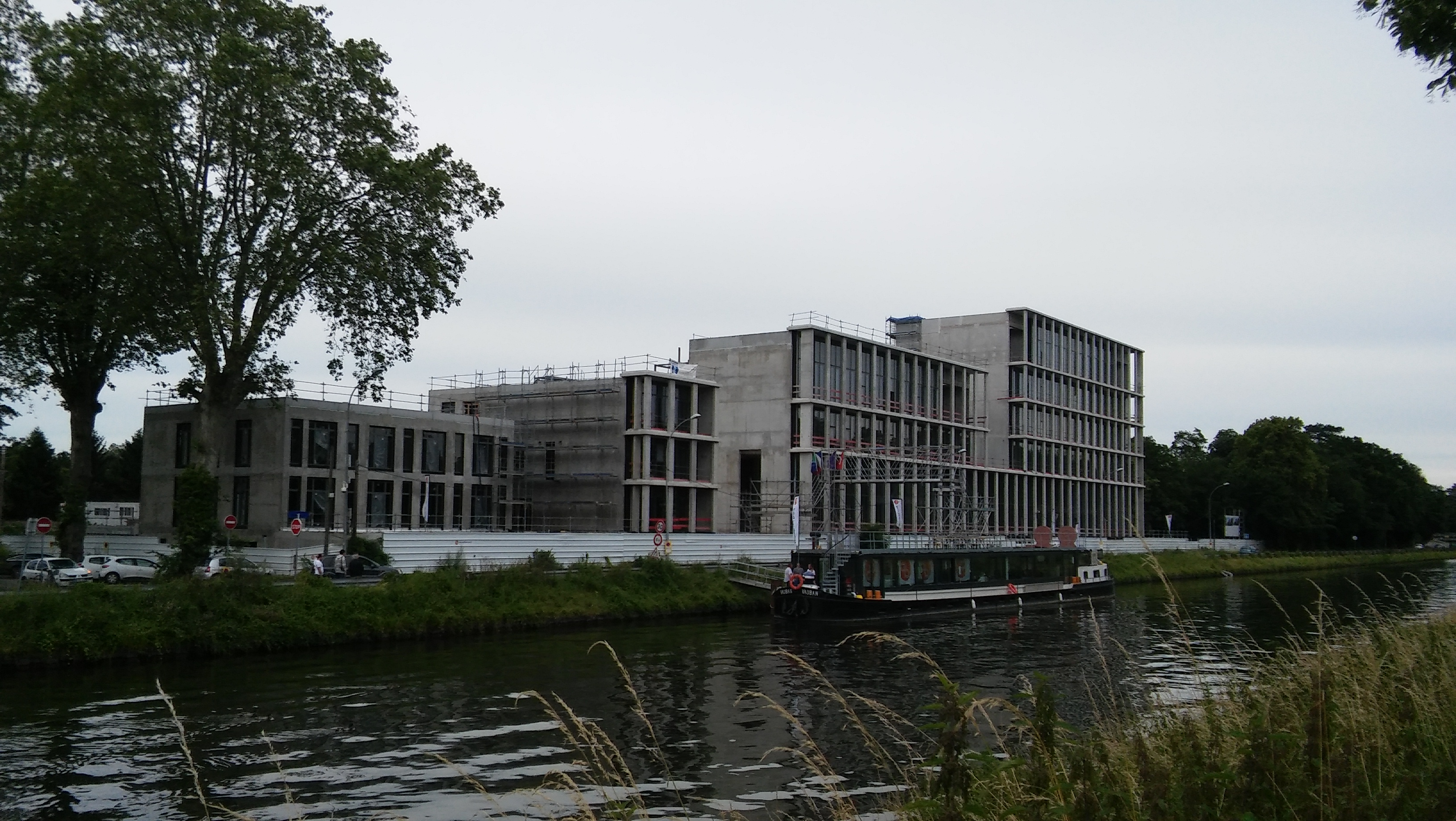
Consulate-General of Turkey in Strasbourg

== See also ==
- Galatasaray High School and Galatasaray University
- Foreign relations of France
- Foreign relations of Turkey
- EU–Turkey relations
- Turks in France
- Turks in Europe
