= Charles-Joseph Tissot =

French diplomat and archaeologist (1828-1884)

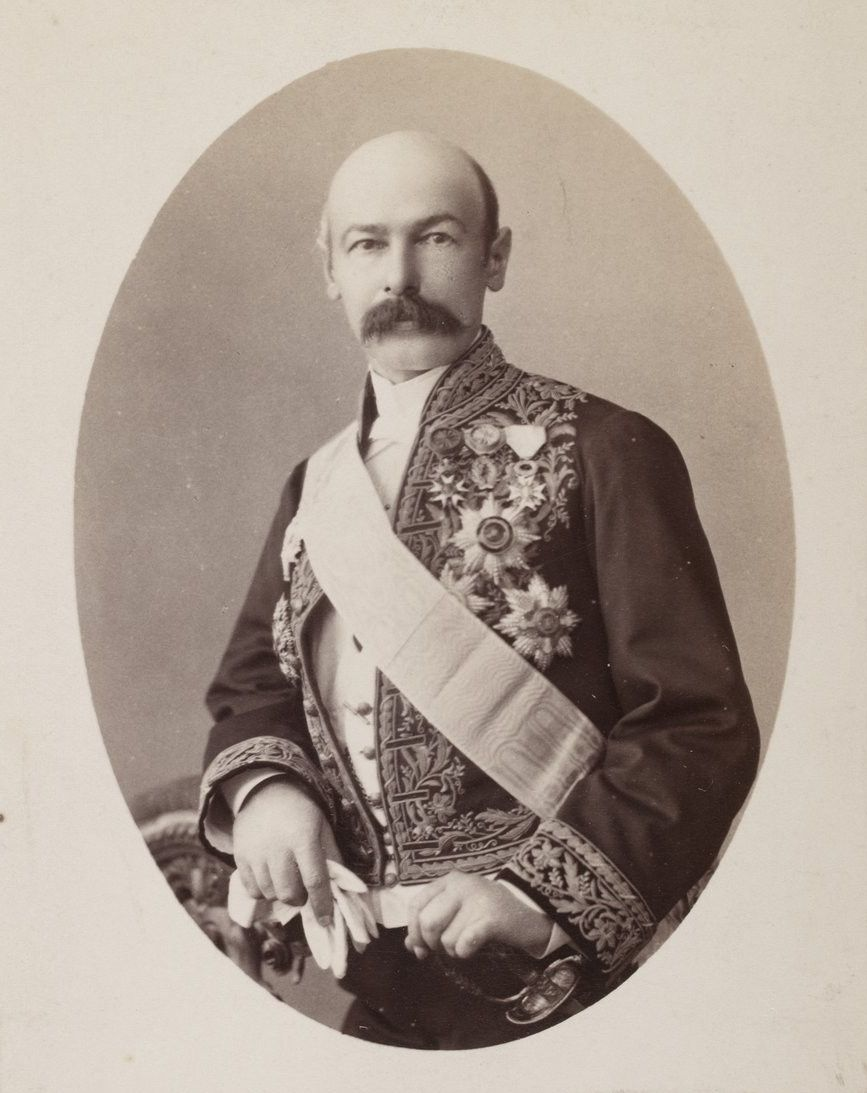
- Born: 29 August 1828; Paris, France
- Died: 2 July 1884 (aged 55); Paris, France
- Education: École d'administration
- Occupations: diplomat, archaeologist
- Notable work: Exploration scientifique de la Tunisie: Géographie comparée de la province romaine d’Afrique (Scientific Exploration of Tunisia: Comparative Geography of the Roman Province of Africa)
- Title: Ambassador of France to the Ottoman Empire
- Term: 1880-1882
- Predecessor: Hugues Fournier
- Successor: Emmanuel Henri Victurnien de Noailles
- Honours: Grand-croix of the Legion of Honour

Charles-Joseph Tissot (English: /tiːˈsoʊ/ tee-SOH, French: [ʃaʁl ʒozɛf tiso]), also known as Charles Tissot, was a French diplomat and archaeologist, a pioneer in the exploration of ancient North Africa. He was born on 29 August 1828 in Paris and died there on 2 July 1884.

== Early life and education ==
Born into a very old Italian family established in Franche-Comté since the 12th century, Tissot's father, a lawyer and aggregated professor of philosophy, chose to teach this subject in Bourges and later in Dijon, and also taking charge of his son's education. Charles Tissot learned English, German, Spanish, Latin, Greek, as well as drawing through this upbringing.

Tissot studied at Lycée Charlemagne and continued at the Faculty of Law in Dijon. Admitted to the newly founded École d'administration, he became a consul student in Tunis in 1852. He married in this city to Valentine-Marie-Caroline Thomas in 1854 and learned Arabic there. His encounter with the archaeologist and chaplain of Saint-Louis-de-Carthage, Abbot Bourgade, influenced his archaeological vocation.

Upon returning to Paris, advised by Ernest Renan and Léon Renier, Tissot prepared a thesis, then returned to Tunisia in 1855 dedicating his Latin thesis to the study of the Lake Tritonis.

== Career ==
In 1856, Tissot envisioned a significant excavation in Carthage, which he couldn't carry out. Nevertheless, he engaged in epigraphic surveys, studying roads and itineraries. Travelling throughout the Regency of Algiers in 1857, he collected numerous Roman inscriptions, discovered a route unmentioned by the Peutinger Table, and identified the location of Thuburbo Majus, determining the intermediate points between Thuburbo and Hadrumetum.

As a consul, Tissot lived successively in Spain, Thessaloniki, and Edirne, collaborating with Charles de La Valette on Herzegovina and a reconciliation attempt between Turks and Montenegrins. He followed La Valette to Rome, and after writing his work La Campagne de César en Afrique (1862), he was sent to Iași in Romania, later becoming the deputy director of political affairs at the Ministry of Foreign Affairs.

In 1869, Tissot went to London with La Valette, serving as his first secretary. In 1871, he was appointed as the plenipotentiary minister to Morocco. He resumed his archaeological research, exploring all the Roman roads of the country, establishing the map of a region practically unexplored until then in his work Recherches sur la géographie comparée de la Maurétanie tingitane (Research on the Comparative Geography of Mauretania Tingitana) (1871-1876). Concurrently, he continued his research on Roman roads in Tunisia, publishing inscriptions revealing the name and location of Banasa and a map of Mauretania Tingitana in the Revue archéologique.

In 1874, he submitted his thesis to Ernest Desjardins, who presented it to the Académie des Inscriptions et Belles-Lettres. Tissot read it before the academy, which elected him as a corresponding member in 1876.

In 1876, Tissot explored the lower stream of the Medjerda River. As the Minister of France in Athens (1876-1879), Albert Dumont entrusted him with the presidency of the Hellenic Correspondence Institute.

During a leave he obtained, Tissot explored the Bagradas River, reconstructing the Roman road from Carthage to Hippo Regius via Bulla Regia, documenting numerous inscriptions. He shared his work with Theodor Mommsen, who, in gratitude, appointed him a member of the German Archaeological Institute.

Appointed as an extraordinary and plenipotentiary ambassador to Constantinople (1880), then to London (1882), elected as a member of the Académie des Inscriptions et Belles-Lettres (1880), Tissot refused to follow the advice of Salomon Reinach and to entrust the exploration of Tunisia to the students of the École française de Rome. Nevertheless, he became Reinach's collaborator and developed with him the Géographie comparée de la province romaine d'Afrique (Comparative Geography of the Roman Province of Africa).

In March 1883, Tissot became the President of the Archaeological Commission of Tunisia but died suddenly at his residence, in the 6th arrondissement of Paris on 2 July 1884.

== Publications ==
- Des proxénies grecques et leur analogie avec les institutions consulaires, 1863.
- De Tritonide lacu, 1863.
- Recherches sur la géographie comparée de la Maurétanie tingitane, Comptes rendus de l'Académie des inscriptions et belles-lettres, 1877.
- Le Bassin du Bagrada et la voie romaine de Carthage à Hippone par Bulla Regia, 1881.
- Recherches sur la campagne de César en Afrique, 1884.
- Exploration scientifique de la Tunisie: Géographie comparée de la province romaine d’Afrique, 2 vols. and an atlas, 1884–1891.
- Fastes de la province romaine d'Afrique, with S. Reinach, 1885.

A portion of Charles-Joseph Tissot's archives is preserved at the Institut National d'Histoire de l'Art.

== Bibliography ==
- Ève and Jean Gran-Aymerich, Charles-Joseph Tissot, in Archéologia No. 209, January 1986, p. 67-72.
- Numa Broc, Dictionnaire des Explorateurs français du 19th century, Vol. 1, Afrique, CTHS, 1988, p. 311-312.
- Ève Gran-Aymerich, Les Chercheurs de passé, Éditions du CNRS, 2007, p. 1193-1195.
