= Palais de France, Istanbul =

Consular building in Istanbul

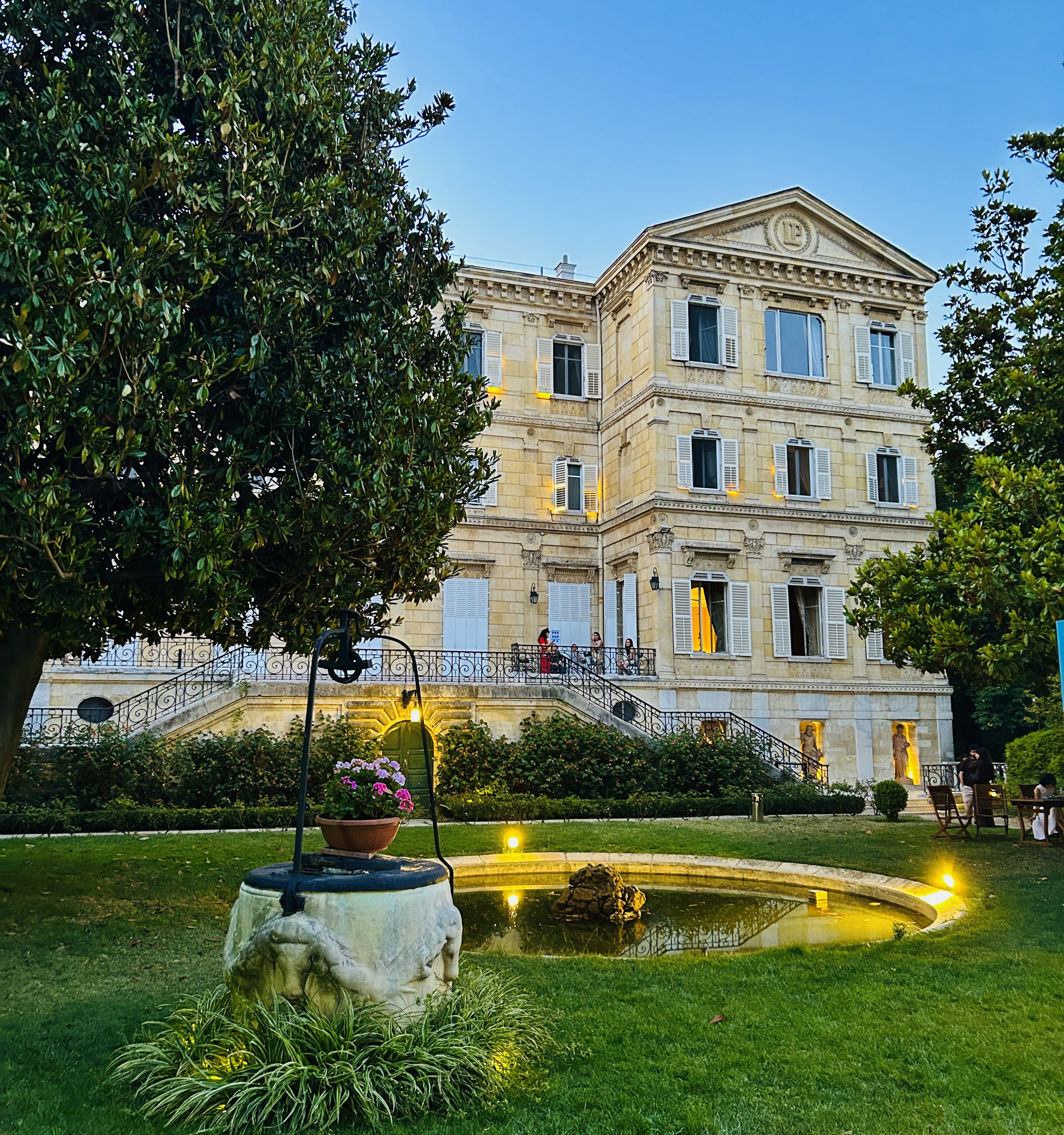
View of the Palais de France's southern façade from the garden, 2025

The Palais de France (lit. 'Palace of France', Turkish: Fransız Sarayı) is a historic property in the Beyoğlu (formerly Pera) neighborhood of Istanbul, Turkey. It was the seat of the ambassadors of France to the Ottoman Empire from the early 17th century until the Empire's abolition in 1922 and subsequent relocation of the embassy to the new capital of Ankara. It has served since then as the residence of the French Consul-General as well as of the ambassador when in Istanbul. It is also the site of the church of Saint-Louis-des-Français, the Lycée Français Pierre Loti, and the Institut Français d'Études Anatoliennes, a research institute.

The French Consulate-General is located in a separate building of the same neighborhood, near Taksim Square. In addition, France maintains a property in the waterside neighborhood of Tarabya on the Bosporus, with additional facilities of the Lycée Pierre Loti.

== Palace building ==
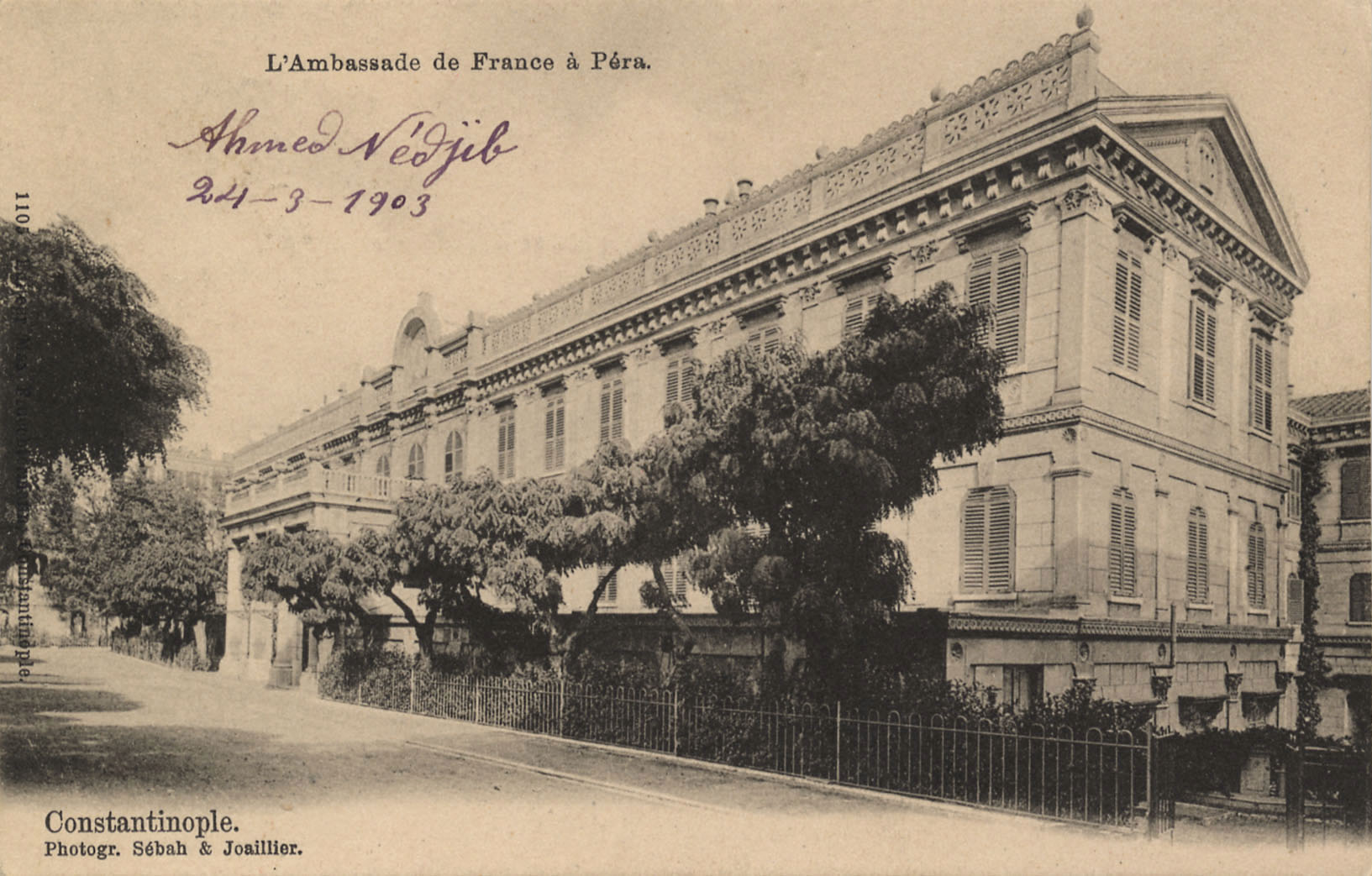
Western façade, 1903 postcard

Successive buildings were commissioned on the same location by ambassadors François Savary de Brèves around 1600 and Henry de Gournay in the early 1630s. The building was damaged by fire in 1665 and again in 1767, after which the comte de Saint-Priest commissioned a new building that was completed in 1777.

In the late 18th century, the embassy had its own printing press in the palace, and following indications from the Paris-based Directoire it initiated in 1795 the publication of periodicals in French, successively the Bulletin de Nouvelles (1795–1796), Gazette Française de Constantinople (1796–1797) and Mercure Oriental (1797), which have been described as the first newspapers ever published in the Ottoman Empire. It also was the site of an observatory, a court, and a prison.

The embassy was closed following the Ottoman declaration of war of 11 September 1798 in reaction to the French occupation of the Ionian Islands in 1797 and invasion of Egypt in 1798. The palace was abandoned by France and used from 1799 by the British ambassador Lord Elgin. After the Treaty of Paris of 1802 restored diplomatic relations, the French ambassador initially resided at the Palace of Venice before recovering the use of the Palais de France, no later than 1818 when architect Jean-Nicolas Huyot designed some improvements.

Following a major fire in 1831, the current main building was constructed between 1839 and 1847 on a design by architect Pierre-Léonard Laurécisque. It was renovated in 1910, including relocation of the main entrance from İstiklal Avenue to Nuri Ziya Sokak to facilitate access for automobiles.

== Garden ==
The palace's garden is ornamented with two Ottoman-style fountains designed by Alexandre Vallaury and several 18th-century statues. A stone bust is said to portray Claude Alexandre, Count of Bonneval.

== Church of Saint-Louis-des-Français ==
Capuchins were active on the palace's precinct from 1626, the same year as their order took over the nearby church of Saint George. Following a fire in 1660, the Ottoman authorized the construction of a church that was consecrated on 25 August 1673. It became a parish church in the early 18th century, and was rebuilt in wood around 1750 then in stone in 1788. After the fire of 1831, it was rebuilt simultaneously as the nearby palace and reopened in 1846, with a blessing ceremony officiated by Apostolic Prefect Mauro Bernardo Pietro Nardi on 1 May 1847. The church is dedicated to Saint Louis.

From 1914 to 1919, diplomatic relations between France and the Empire were again suspended, and the church was briefly converted into a mosque. It was restored in 1923, and renovated again in the 2010s. The church was under the care of French Capuchins from the 17th century to the order's suppression in France in 1790, then of Italian Capuchins from 1813 to 1881, again of French Capuchins from 1881 to 1999, and of Franciscans since 2003.

== Educational and research facilities ==
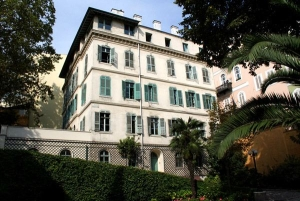
Seat of the Institut Français d'Études Anatoliennes on the grounds of the Palais de France

In 1628, a Catholic seminary was created in relation with the chapel, which operated until the French Revolution. It reopened in 1882 as the Séminaire Saint-Louis, mostly serving children from French and Levantine families in Istanbul.

A new building opened in 1874 to host training for the embassy's dragomans. In 1930, it was converted to host the French Archaeology Institute of Istanbul, newly established by scholar Albert Gabriel, which in 1975 became the Institut Français d'Études Anatoliennes (IFEA).

The seminary closed in 1942. That same year, a group of teachers opened a secular school at the French consulate's building near Taksim Square, then expanded it in 1944 in former seminary rooms on the Palais de France's grounds. That school was reorganized in 1962 as École Française d'Istanbul and renamed in 1989 as Lycée Pierre Loti, in tribute to celebrated orientalist author Pierre Loti who had spent much of his life in Istanbul. It is also known colloquially as "Le Papillon" (lit. 'the butterfly'). It has gradually expanded to various buildings on the property west and south of the Palais de France, whereas its Taksim site closed in 1974.

== Consulate building ==
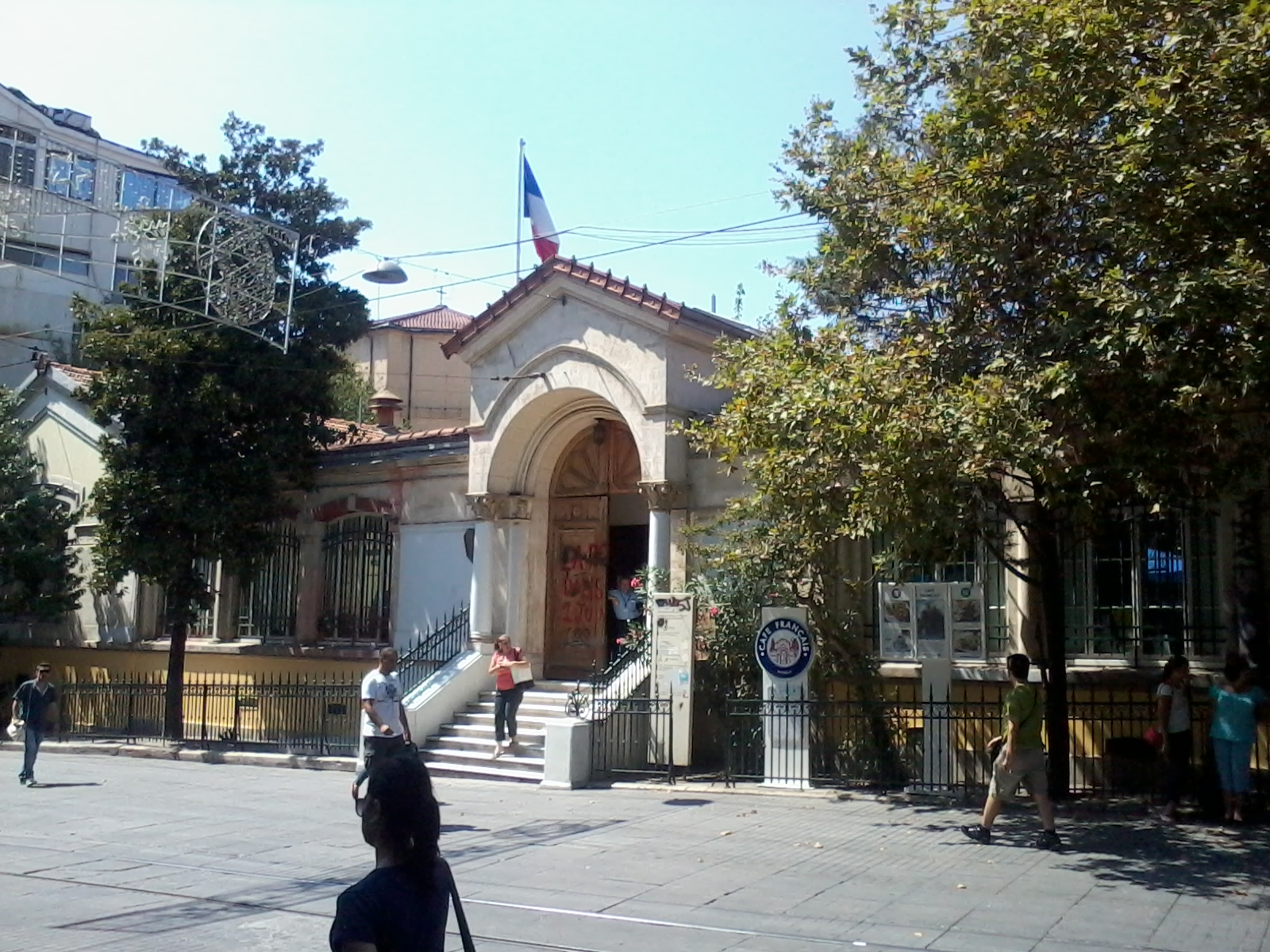
French consulate building, photographed in 2013

Since the 1930s, the French consulate's offices have not been located on the grounds of the Palais de France but on the site of a former French hospital established in the early 18th century and known since 1734 as Hôpital Saint-Louis, then rebuilt in 1893–1896 on a design by architect Pierre-Juste Bourmancé and subsequently named after donor Henri Giffard. The consulate's address is 4 İstiklal Avenue, close to Taksim Square.

== Tarabya waterfront property ==
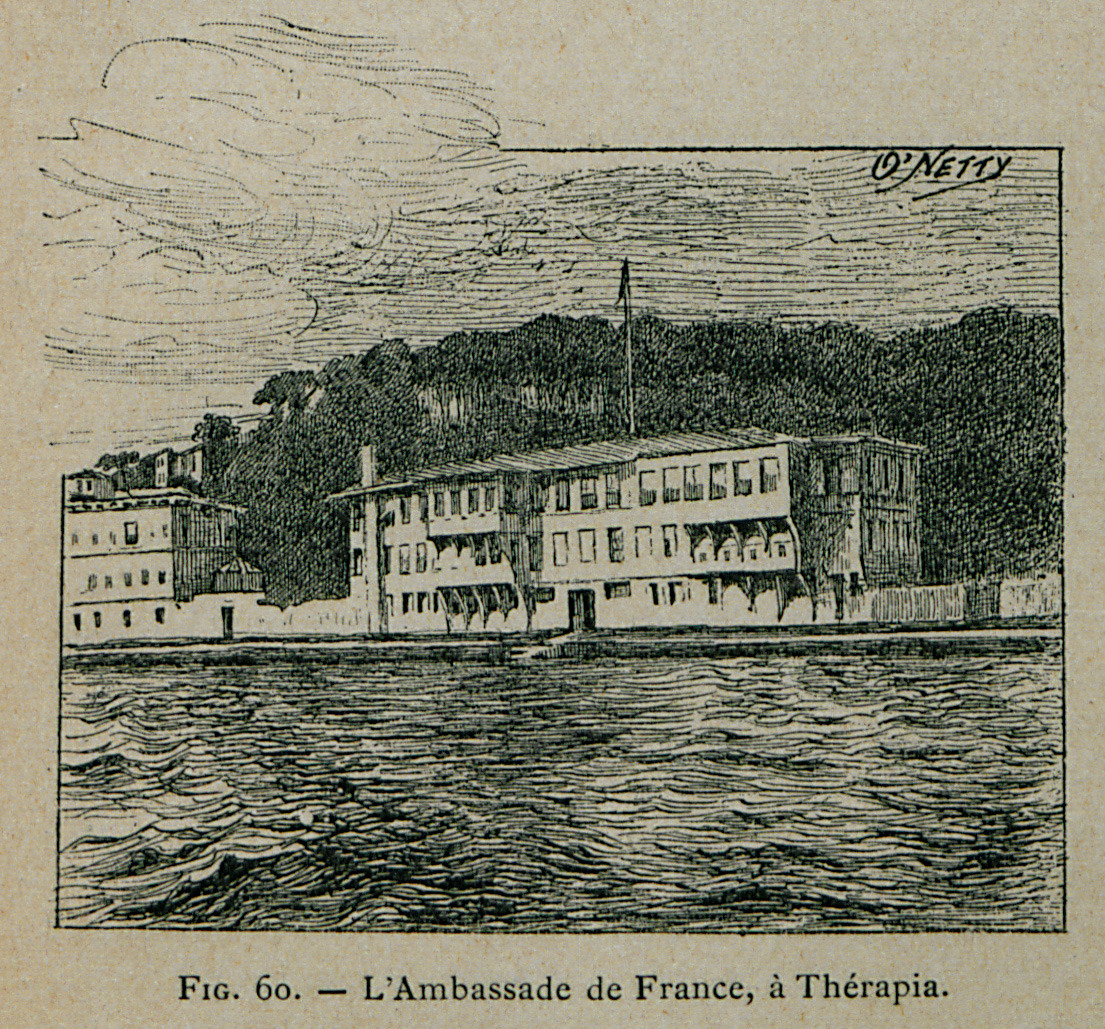
French embassy residence in Tarabya, 1896 engraving

In 1807 at the start of the Russo-Turkish War, Prince Constantine Ypsilantis fled to the Russian Empire and abandoned his yalı in Tarabya, on present-day Kefelikoy Caddesi, which had been built in the late 18th century on a design by Antoine Ignace Melling. Selim III donated the empty mansion to French ambassador Horace Sébastiani in recognition of the latter's support against the United Kingdom during the Dardanelles operation, and it became the summer residence of subsequent ambassadors. That building was destroyed by fire in 1903 or 1913, while another smaller building on the same grounds survived despite separate fire damage in 1932.

in 2003, a new campus of the Lycée Pierre Loti was inaugurated on part of France's Tarabya property.

== See also ==
- List of ambassadors of France to the Ottoman Empire
- Embassy of France, Ankara
- Palais de Hollande, Istanbul
