= Jacques Tarbé de Saint-Hardouin =

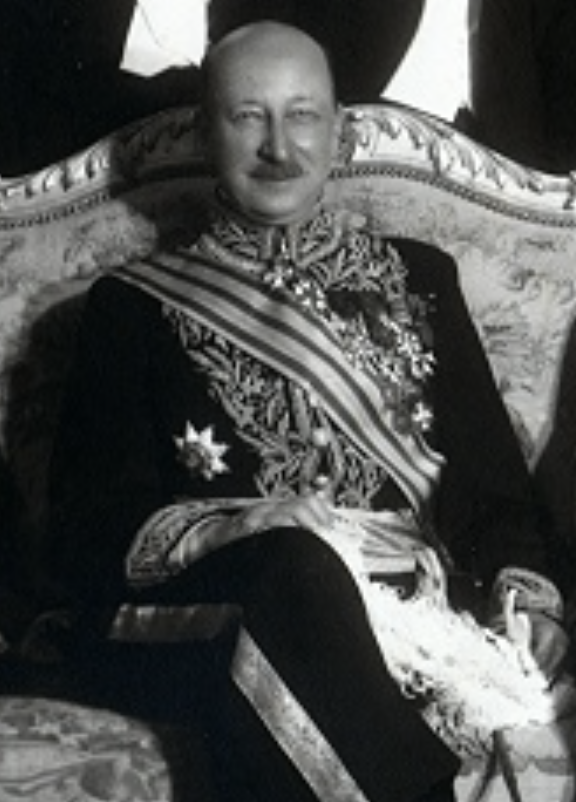
- Born: December 5, 1899; Reims
- Died: September 25, 1956 (aged 56); Neuilly-sur-Seine
- Occupation: Diplomat
- Parent(s): Georges Tarbé de Saint-Hardouin; Renée Étienne

Jacques Tarbé de Saint-Hardouin (1899-1956) was a French diplomat who took part in the French Resistance during the Second World War.

== Early life ==
Jacques Tarbé de Saint-Hardouin was born on December 5, 1899. His father was Georges Tarbé de Saint-Hardouin and his mother, Renée Étienne.

== Career ==
- He was delegated to Wiesbaden for the Armistice Conference on June 22, 1940.
- Political assistant to General Maxime Weygand in Algiers, he prepared and took part in the Allied landings in North Africa in November 1942.
- Secretary for External Affairs - equivalent to Minister of Foreign Affairs - in the French Civil and Military High Command, the provisional government headed by General Giraud in Algiers.
- Delegate to Turkey for the French Committee of National Liberation in 1943.
- Ambassador to Baden in 1945 and political advisor to General Kœnig.
- He served as a diplomat in Berlin in 1948. He warned that the Soviet Union might try to expel Westerners from Berlin.
- He served as the French Ambassador to Turkey from 1952 to 1955.

He was made Commander of the French Legion of Honor.

== Death ==
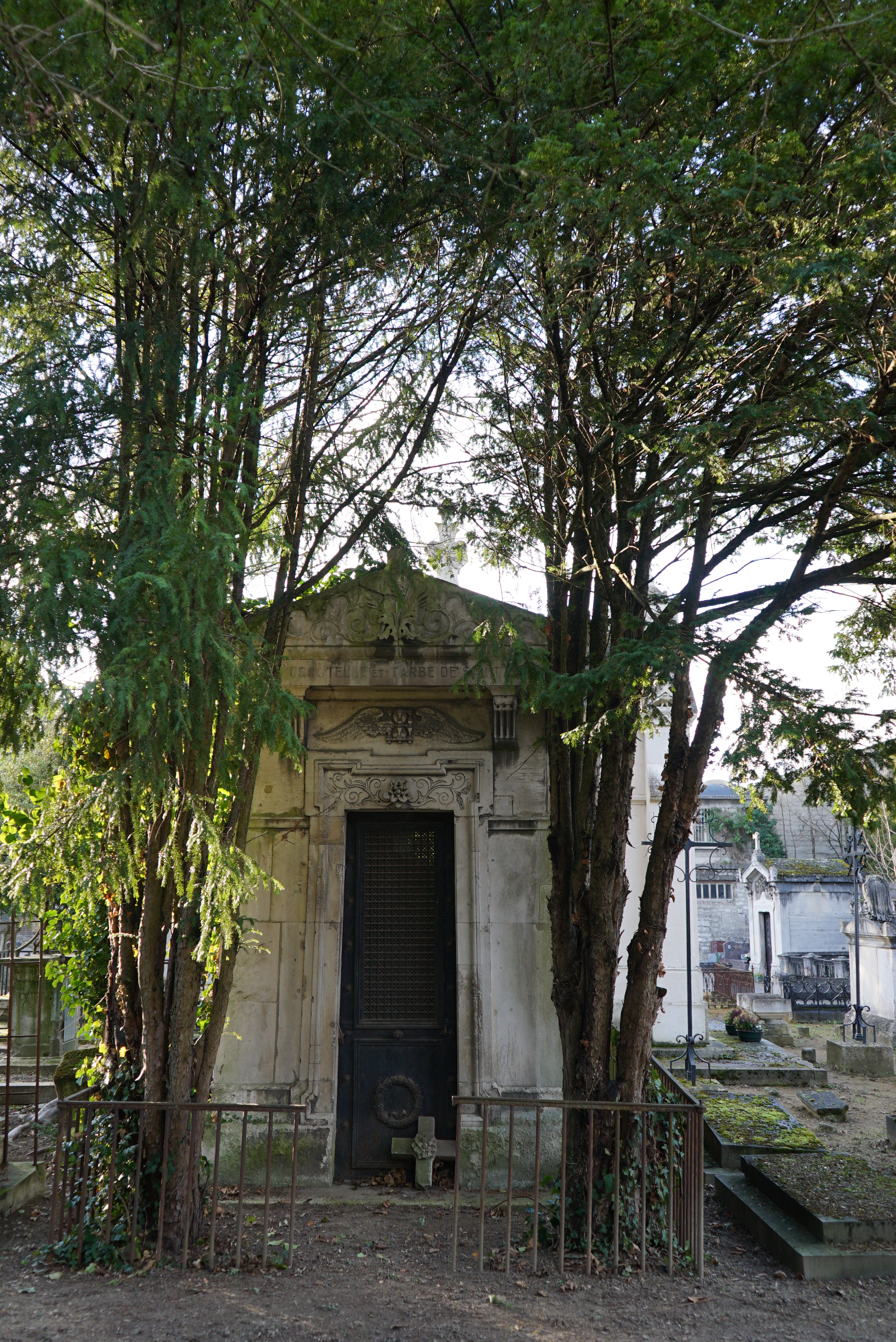
Jacques Tarbé de Saint-Hardouin's tomb

He died on September 25, 1956, in Neuilly-sur-Seine near Paris.
