= Embassy of France, Ankara =

Embassy of France in Ankara
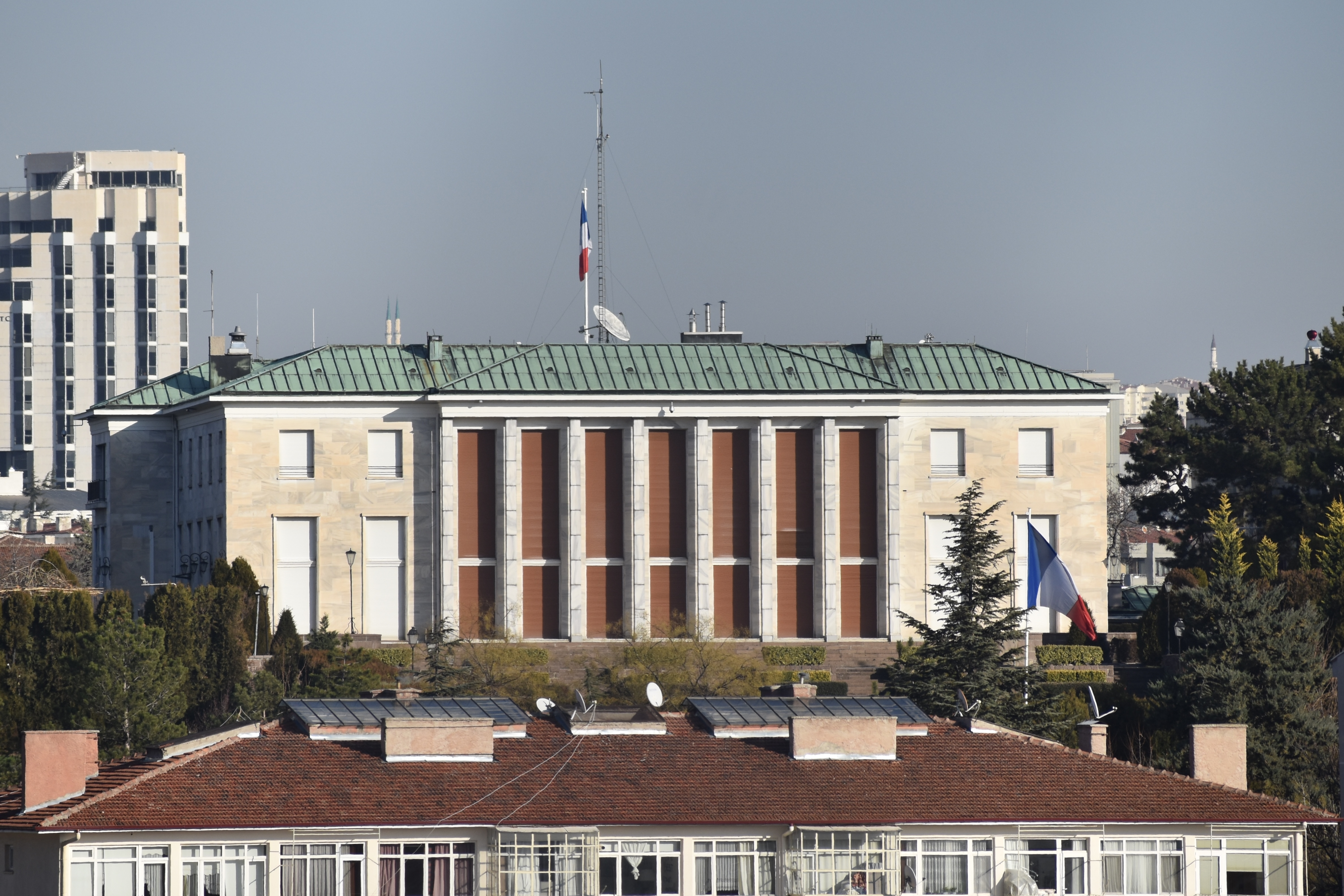
- Location: Ankara, Turkey
- Address: Paris Street N° 70, Kavaklıdere Cd. 06540 Çankaya, Ankara, Turkey
- Coordinates: 39.9024°N 32.8565°E
- Ambassador: Isabelle Dumont
- Jurisdiction: Turkey
- Website: Official website

Embassy of France in Ankara (French: Ambassade de France en Turquie) is France's diplomatic mission to Turkey. It is located at Paris Street, Kavaklıdere, Çankaya. It is designed by Albert Laprade.

The current ambassador is Isabelle Dumont who is a fluent Turkish speaker.

== See also ==
- List of ambassadors of France to Turkey
- Diplomatic missions of France
- Foreign relations of France
- France–Turkey relations
- Embassy of Turkey, Paris
