= Embassy of Turkey, Paris =

Diplomatic mission of Turkey in France

Embassy of Turkey in Paris
- Location: 16 Avenue de Lambelle, Paris
- Ambassador: Yunus Demirer
- Website: http://paris.be.mfa.gov.tr

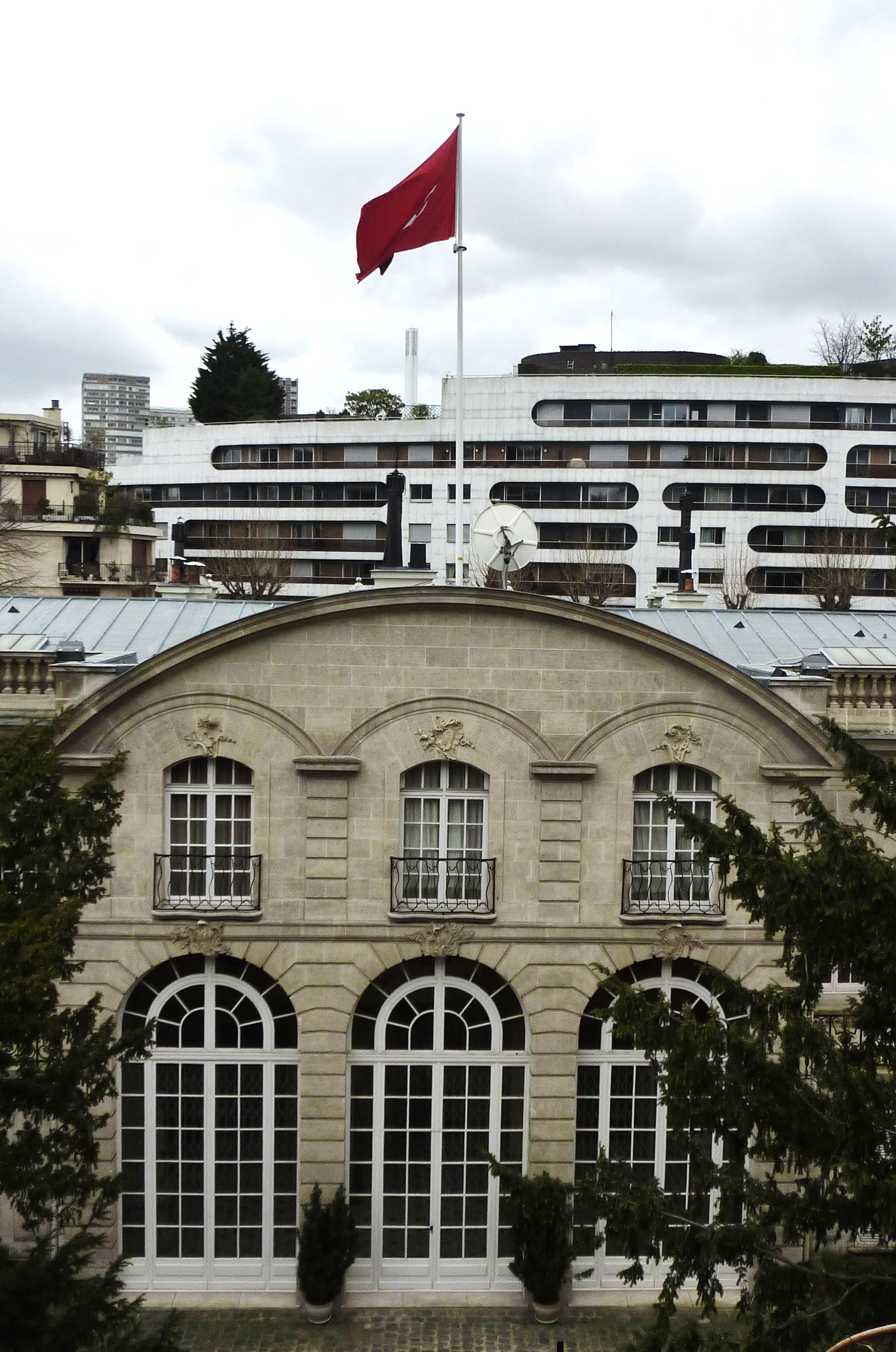
Turkish embassy in Paris

The Embassy of Turkey in Paris (Turkish: Türkiye'nin Paris Büyükelçiliği) is the diplomatic mission of Turkey in France. It is located on 16 Avenue de Lamballe, Paris.

== History ==
During the Ottoman Empire period, special representatives were sent to the Kingdom of France starting at year 1483, within the framework of the alliance established between Francis I of France and Suleiman the Magnificent in 1536, France opened an embassy in Istanbul in 1536.

Yirmisekiz Çelebi Mehmet Efendi was the first long-term Ambassador to France by the Ottoman Empire. Çelebi Mehmet Efendi, who was sent to France in 1720, prepared a comprehensive report on the country and remained in France until 1722.

Previous locations of the chancery
Sending Country	From	Until	Estate's name	Address	Notes
Ottoman Empire	1798	1810	Hôtel de Monaco	57 Rue Saint Dominique	The same estate is being used by the Embassy of Poland in Paris
Ottoman Empire	1810	1815	Hôtel de Bernage	2 Rue de Lille	
Ottoman Empire	1815	1835	-	11 Rue la Planche	
Ottoman Empire	1835	1839	Hôtel du Châtelet	121 Rue de Grenelle	
Ottoman Empire	1839	1854	Hôtel de Grimod de la Reynière	1 Rue Boissy d’Anglas	The same estate is being used by the Embassy of United States in Paris
Ottoman Empire	1854	1863	Hôtel de Villars	116 Rue de Grenelle	
Ottoman Empire	1863	1872	Hôtel des Maréchaux	10 Rue de Presbourg	
Ottoman Empire	1872	1888	Hôtel de Saint-Julien	17 Rue Laffitte	
Ottoman Empire	1888	1908	Hôtel des Maréchaux	10 Rue de Presbourg	
Ottoman Empire	1908	1946	-	33 Rue Villejust	Ottoman Empire until 1923
Ottoman Empire	1908	1946	-	33 Rue Villejust	Current name of the street is "Rue Paul Valéry"
Republic of Turkey	1908	1946	-	33 Rue Villejust	Current name of the street is "Rue Paul Valéry"
Republic of Turkey	1946	Present	Hôtel de Lamballe	16 Avenue de Lamballe	

== Accreditation ==
The embassy is accredited to Monaco.
