= Kavaklıdere, Ankara =

Kavaklıdere
- Neighbourhood
- Location within Turkey Location within Turkey Central Anatolia
- Coordinates: 39°54′43″N 32°51′21″E
- Country: Turkey
- Province: Ankara
- District: Çankaya
- Population (2025): 6,198
- Time zone: UTC+3 (TRT)

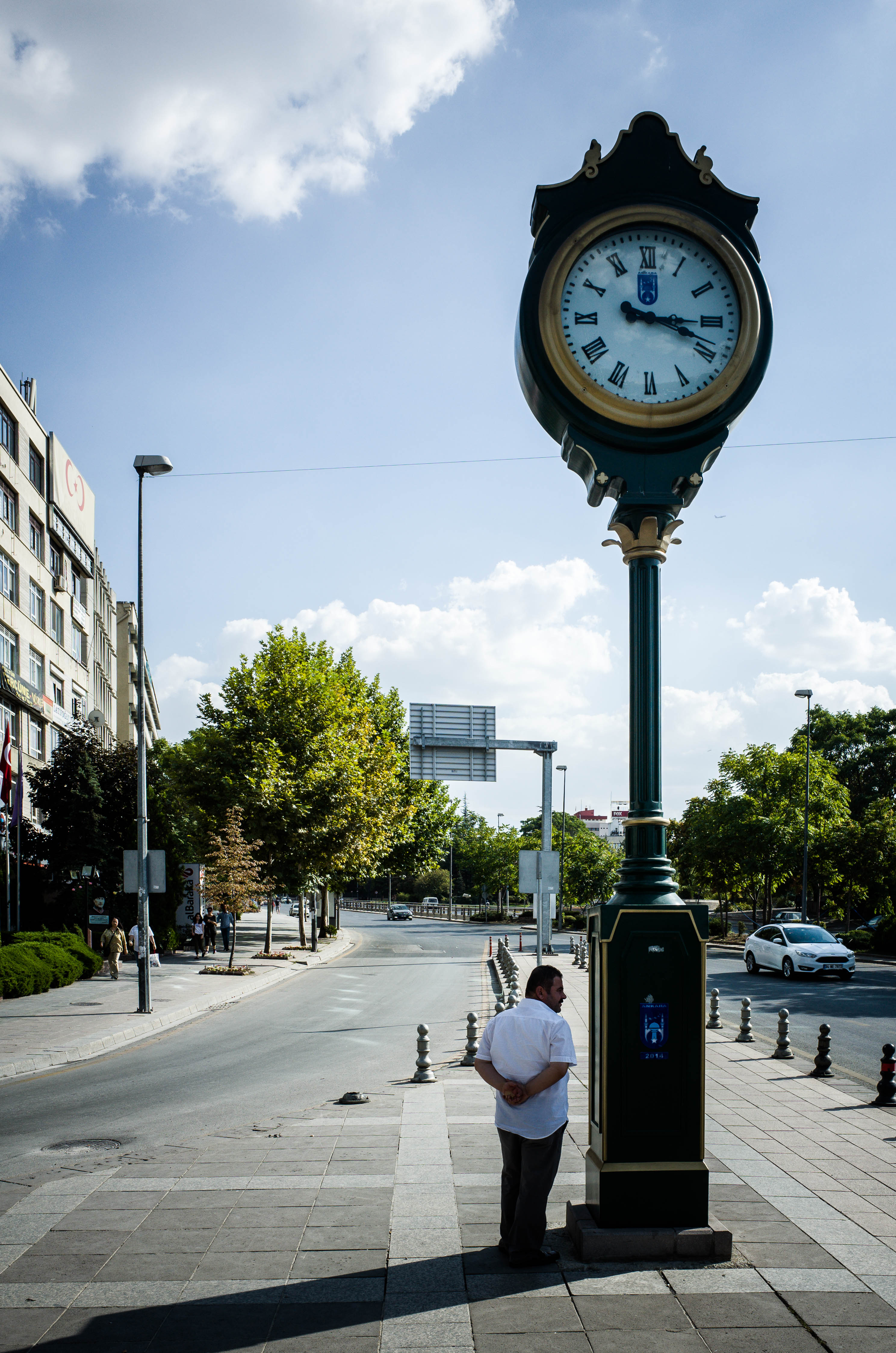

Kavaklıdere is a neighbourhood in the municipality and district of Çankaya, Ankara Province, Turkey. Its population is 6,190 (2022). The name means "poplar stream" in Turkish.
