= Franco-Ottoman alliance =

16th-century alliance of Francis I and Suleiman I

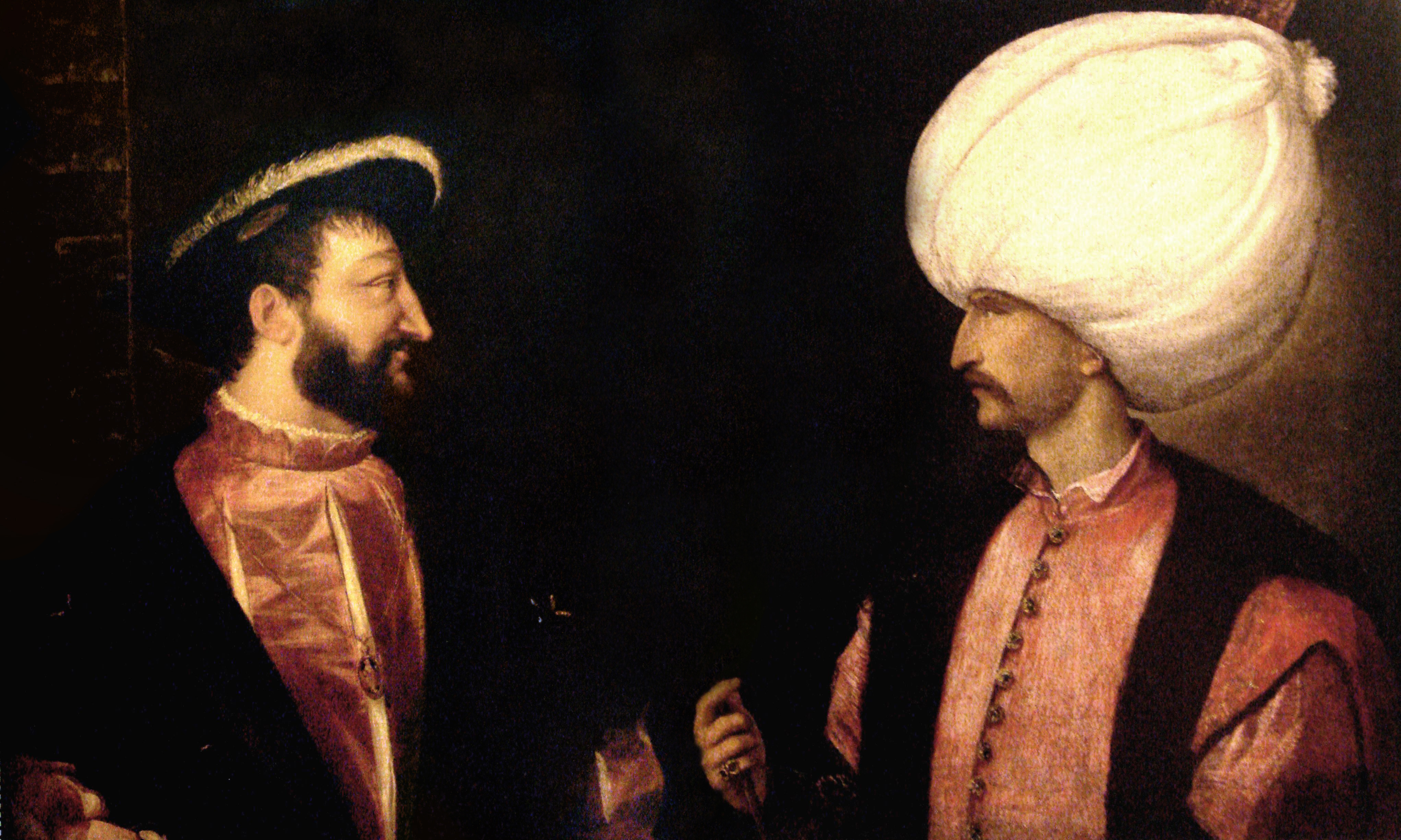
Francis I (left) and Suleiman I (right) initiated the Franco-Ottoman alliance. They never met in person; this is a composite of two separate paintings by Titian, circa 1530.

The Franco-Ottoman alliance or Franco-Turkish alliance was established in 1536 between Francis I, King of France and Suleiman I of the Ottoman Empire. The strategic and sometimes tactical alliance was one of the longest-lasting and most important foreign alliances of France, and was particularly influential during the Italian Wars. The Franco-Ottoman military alliance reached its peak with the Invasion of Corsica in 1553, during the reign of Henry II of France.

As the first non-ideological alliance in effect between a Christian and Muslim state, it attracted heavy controversy for its time and caused a scandal throughout Christendom. Carl Jacob Burckhardt (1947) called it "the sacrilegious union of the lily and the crescent". It lasted intermittently for more than two and a half centuries, until the Napoleonic campaign in Ottoman Egypt from 1798 to 1801.

== Background ==
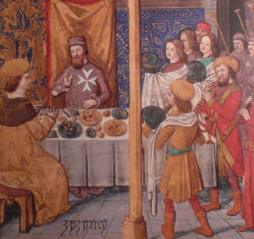
Ottoman Prince Cem with Pierre d'Aubusson in Bourganeuf, 1483–1489.

Following the Turkish conquest of Constantinople in 1453 by Mehmed II and the unification of swaths of the Middle East under Selim I, Suleiman I, the son of Selim, managed to expand Ottoman rule to Serbia in 1522. The Holy Roman Empire thus entered in direct conflict with the Ottomans.

Some early contacts seem to have taken place between the Ottomans and the French. Philippe de Commines reports that Bayezid II sent an embassy to Louis XI in 1483, while Cem, his brother and rival pretender to the Ottoman throne was being detained in France at Bourganeuf by Pierre d'Aubusson. Louis XI refused to see the envoys, but a large amount of money and Christian relics were offered by the envoy to keep Cem in custody in France. Cem was transferred to the custody of Pope Innocent VIII in 1489.

France had signed a first treaty or Capitulation with the Mamluk Sultanate of Egypt in 1500, during the reigns of Louis XII and Sultan Bayezid II, in which the Sultan of Egypt had made concessions to the French and the Catalans, and which was later extended by Suleiman.

The 1536 agreement was not a static treaty but a dynamic framework subject to constant renegotiation and expansion throughout the alliance's duration. Subsequent Capitulations (notably in 1569, 1581, 1597, 1604, 1673, and the pivotal 1740 agreement) progressively extended French privileges far beyond the original military pact. These later agreements solidified extensive extraterritorial jurisdiction for French consuls, granted France protective rights over Catholic holy sites in the Ottoman Empire, and cemented a near-monopoly status for French merchants in the Levantine trade, profoundly shaping French economic and political influence.

France had already been looking for allies in Central Europe. The ambassador of France Antonio Rincon was employed by Francis I on several missions to Poland and Hungary between 1522 and 1525. At that time, following the 1522 Battle of Bicoque, Francis I was attempting to ally with king Sigismund I the Old of Poland. Finally, in 1524, a Franco-Polish alliance was signed between Francis I and king Sigismund I of Poland.

There was a momentous intensification of the search for allies in Central Europe when the French ruler Francis I was defeated at the Battle of Pavia on February 24, 1525, by the troops of Emperor Charles V. After several months in prison, Francis I was forced to sign the humiliating Treaty of Madrid, through which he had to relinquish the Duchy of Burgundy and the Charolais to the Empire, renounce his Italian ambitions, and return his belongings and honours to the traitor Constable de Bourbon. This situation forced Francis I to find an ally against the powerful Habsburg Emperor, in the person of Suleiman the Magnificent.

== Alliance of Francis I and Suleiman ==
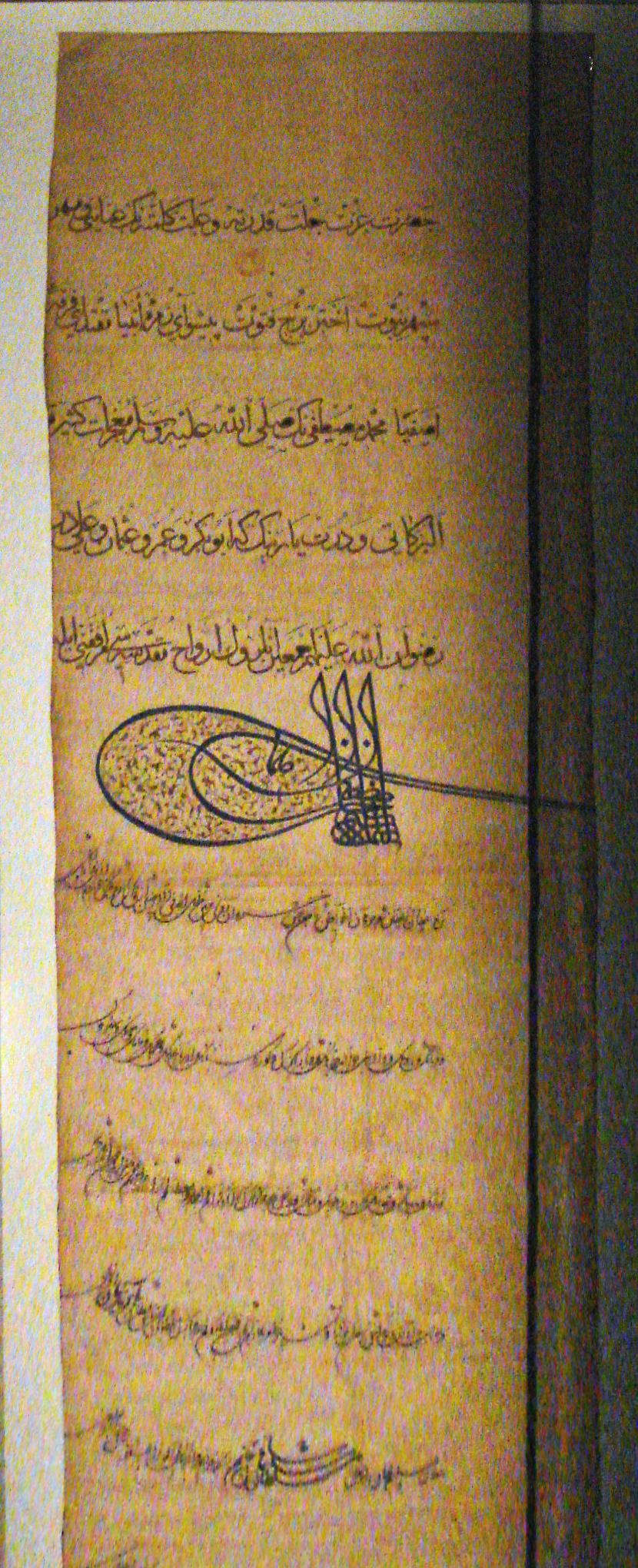
First letter from Suleiman to Francis I in February 1526.

The alliance was an opportunity for both rulers to fight against the hegemony of the House of Habsburg. The objective for Francis I was to find an ally against the Habsburgs, although his predecessors had never courted a Muslim power. The pretext used by Francis I was the protection of the Christians in Ottoman lands, through agreements called "Capitulations of the Ottoman Empire".

King Francis was imprisoned in Madrid when the first efforts at establishing an alliance were made. A first French mission to Suleiman seems to have been sent immediately after the Battle of Pavia by the mother of Francis I, Louise de Savoie, but the mission was lost on its way in Bosnia. In December 1525 a second mission was sent, led by John Frangipani, which managed to reach Constantinople, the Ottoman capital, with secret letters asking for the deliverance of king Francis I and an attack on the Habsburg. Frangipani returned with an answer from Suleiman, on 6 February 1526:

I who am the Sultan of Sultans, the sovereign of sovereigns, the dispenser of crowns to the monarchs on the face of the earth, the shadow of the God on Earth, the Sultan and sovereign lord of the Mediterranean Sea and of the Black Sea, of Rumelia and of Anatolia, of Karamania, of the land of Romans, of Dhulkadria, of Diyarbakir, of Kurdistan, of Azerbaijan, of Persia, of Damascus, of Aleppo, of Cairo, of Mecca, of Medina, of Jerusalem, of all Arabia, of Yemen and of many other lands which my noble fore-fathers and my glorious ancestors (may God light up their tombs!) conquered by the force of their arms and which my August Majesty has made subject to my flamboyant sword and my victorious blade, I, Sultan Suleiman Khan, son of Sultan Selim Khan, son of Sultan Bayezid Khan: To thee who art Francesco, king of the province of France ... You have sent to my Porte, refuge of sovereigns, a letter by the hand of your faithful servant Frangipani, and you have furthermore entrusted to him miscellaneous verbal communications. You have informed me that the enemy has overrun your country and that you are at present in prison and a captive, and you have asked aid and succors for your deliverance. All this your saying having been set forth at the foot of my throne, which controls the world. Your situation has gained my imperial understanding in every detail, and I have considered all of it. There is nothing astonishing in emperors being defeated and made captive. Take courage then, and be not dismayed. Our glorious predecessors and our illustrious ancestors (may God light up their tombs!) have never ceased to make war to repel the foe and conquer his lands. We ourselves have followed in their footsteps, and have at all times conquered provinces and citadels of great strength and difficult of approach. Night and day our horse is saddled and our saber is girt. May the God on High promote righteousness! May whatsoever he will be accomplished! For the rest, question your ambassador and be informed. Know that it will be as said.

— Answer from Suleiman the Magnificent to Francis I of France, February 1526.

The plea of the French king nicely corresponded to the ambitions of Suleiman in Europe, and gave him an incentive to attack Hungary in 1526, leading to the Battle of Mohács. The Ottomans were also greatly attracted by the prestige of being in alliance with such a country as France, which would give them better legitimacy in their European dominions.

Meanwhile, Charles V was manoeuvring to form an alliance with Persia, so that the Ottoman Empire would be attacked on its rear. Envoys were sent to Shah Tahmasp I in 1525, and again in 1529, pleading for an attack on the Ottoman Empire.

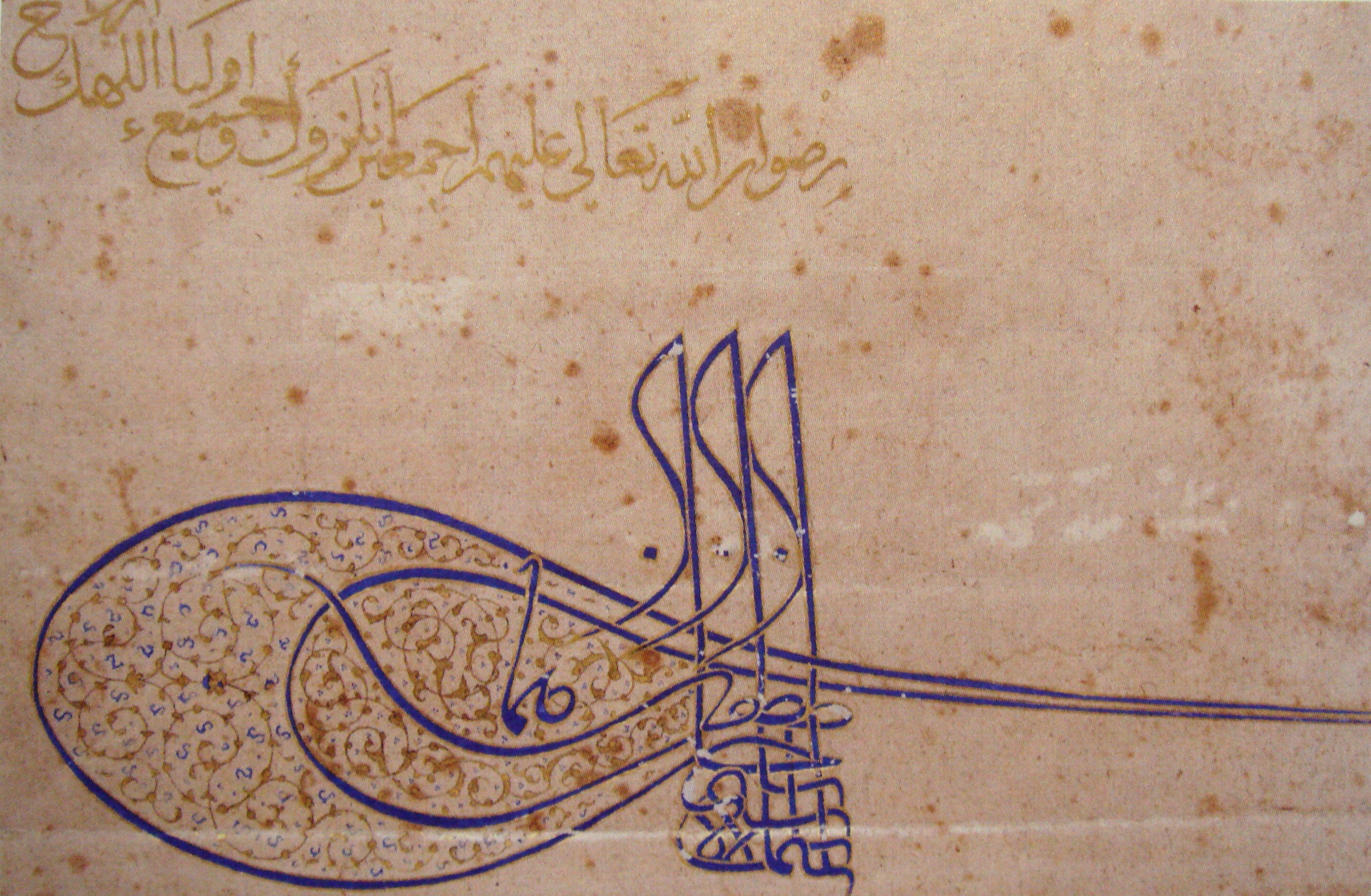
Letter of Suleiman the Magnificent to Francis I of France regarding the protection of Christians in his states. September 1528. Archives Nationales, Paris, France

With the War of the League of Cognac (1526–1530) going on, Francis I continued to look for allies in Central Europe, and in 1528 formed an alliance with the Hungarian king Zapolya, who had himself become a vassal of the Ottoman Empire that year. In 1528 also, Francis used the pretext of the protection of Christians in the Ottoman Empire to again enter into contact with Suleiman, asking for a mosque to be reinstated as a Christian Church. In his 1528 letter to Francis I Suleiman politely refused, but guaranteed the protection of Christians in his states. He also renewed the privileges of French merchants which had been obtained in 1517 in Egypt.

Francis I lost in his European campaigns, and had to sign the Paix des Dames in August 1529. He was even forced to supply some galleys to Charles V in his fight against the Ottomans. However, the Ottomans continued their campaigns in Central Europe, and besieged the Habsburg capital in the 1529 siege of Vienna and again in 1532.

=== Exchange of embassies ===
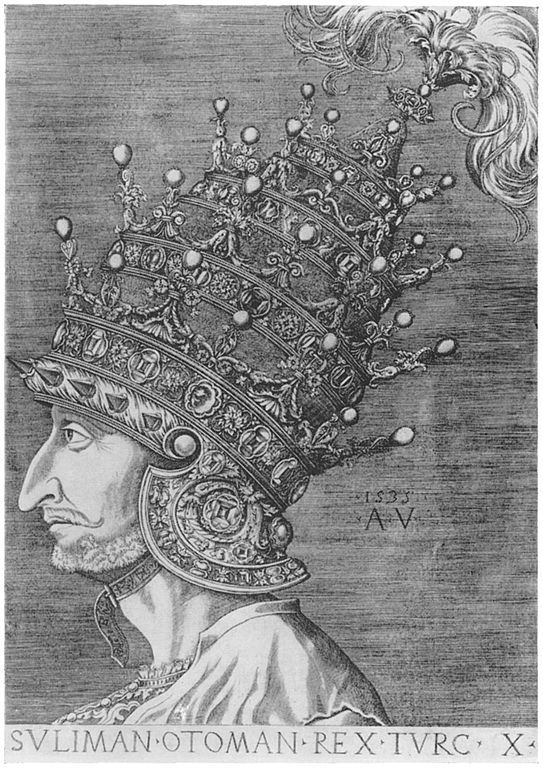
In 1532, the French ambassador Antonio Rincon presented Suleiman with this magnificent tiara or helmet, made in Venice for 115,000 ducats.

In early July 1532, Suleiman was joined by the French ambassador Antonio Rincon in Belgrade. Antonio Rincon presented Suleiman with a magnificent four-tiered tiara, made in Venice for 115,000 ducats. Rincon also described the Ottoman camp:

Astonishing order, no violence. Merchants, women even, coming and going in perfect safety, as in a European town. Life as safe, as large and easy as in Venice. Justice so fairly administered that one is tempted to believe that the Turks are turned Christians now, and that the Christians are turned Turks.

— Antonio Rincon, 1532.

The French ambassador to England Jean de Dinteville in "The Ambassadors", by Hans Holbein the Younger, 1533, including an example of Ottoman carpets in Renaissance painting

Francis I explained to the Venetian ambassador Giorgio Gritti in March 1531 his strategy regarding the Turks:

I cannot deny that I wish to see the Turk all-powerful and ready for war, not for himself – for he is an infidel and we are all Christians – but to weaken the power of the emperor, to compel him to make major expenses, and to reassure all the other governments who are opposed to such a formidable enemy.

— Francis I to the Venetian ambassador.

Ottoman embassies were sent to France, with the Ottoman embassy to France (1533) led by Hayreddin Barbarossa, and the Ottoman embassy to France (1534) led by representatives of Suleiman.

==== Combined operations (1534–35) ====
Suleiman ordered Barbarossa to put his fleet at the disposition of Francis I to attack Genoa and the Milanese. In July 1533 Francis received Ottoman representatives at Le Puy, and dispatched Antonio Rincon in return to Barbarossa in North Africa and then to Asia Minor. Suleiman explained that "he could not possibly abandon the King of France, who was his brother". The Franco-Ottoman alliance was by then effectively made.

In 1534 a Turkish fleet sailed against the Habsburg Empire at the request of Francis I, raiding the Italian coast and finally meeting with representatives of Francis in southern France. The fleet went on to capture Tunis on 16 August 1534, and continued raiding the Italian coast with the support of Francis I. In a counter-attack however, Charles V dislodged them the following year.

==== Permanent embassy of Jean de La Forêt (1535–1537) ====
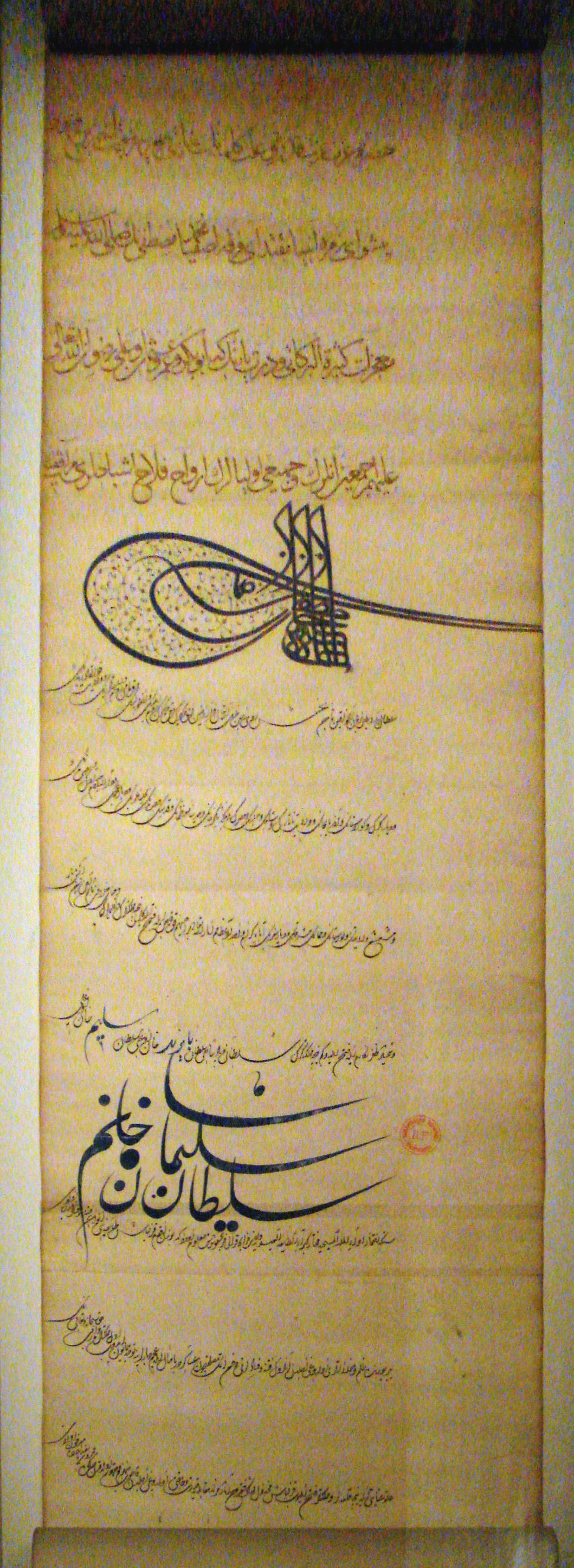
Letter of Suleiman to Francis I in 1536, informing Francis I of the successful campaign of Iraq, and acknowledging the permanent French embassy of Jean de La Forest at the Ottoman court.

===== Trade and religious agreements =====
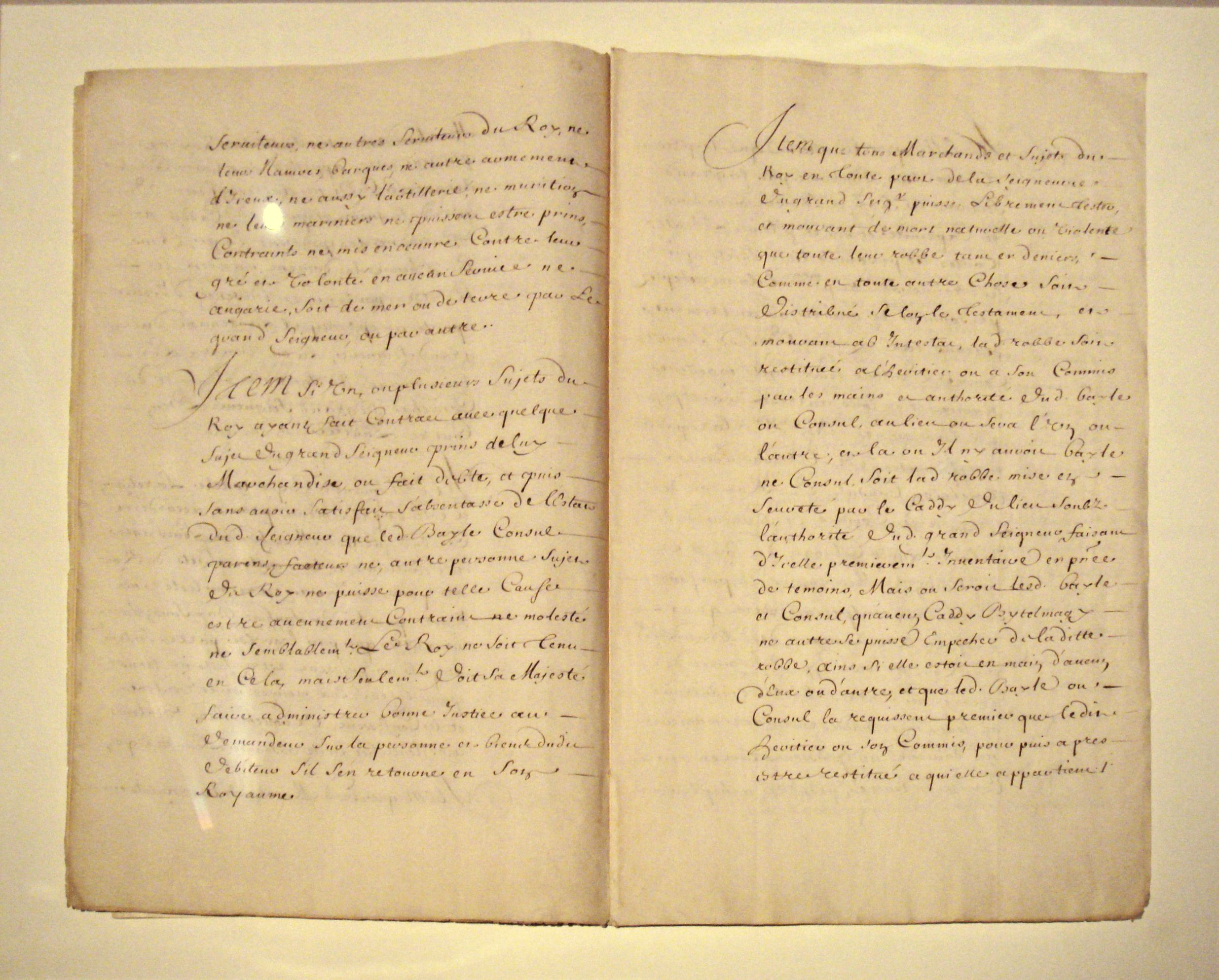
Draft of the 1536 Treaty negotiated between Jean de La Forêt and Ibrahim Pasha, a few days before his assassination, expanding to the whole Ottoman Empire the privileges received in Egypt from the Mamluks before 1518.

Treaties, or capitulations, were passed between the two countries starting in 1528 and 1536. The defeat in the 1535 conquest of Tunis by Andrea Doria motivated the Ottoman Empire to enter into a formal alliance with France. Ambassador Jean de La Forêt was sent to Istanbul, and for the first time was able to become permanent ambassador at the Ottoman court and to negotiate treaties.

Jean de La Forêt negotiated the capitulations on 18 February 1536, on the model of previous Ottoman commercial treaties with Venice and Genoa, although they only seem to have been ratified by the Ottomans later, in 1569, with ambassador Claude Du Bourg. These capitulations allowed the French to obtain important privileges, such as the security of people and goods, extraterritoriality, and freedom to transport and sell goods subject to the payment of the selamlik and customs fees. These capitulations in effect gave the French a near-monopoly in trade with seaport-towns that would be known as les Échelles du Levant. Foreign vessels had to trade with Turkey under the French banner, after the payment of a percentage of their trade.

A French embassy and a Christian chapel were established in the town of Galata across the Golden horn from Constantinople, and commercial privileges were also given to French merchants in the Turkish Empire. Through the capitulations of 1535, the French were awarded the right to trade freely in all Ottoman ports. A formal alliance was signed in 1536. The French were free to practice their religion in the Ottoman Empire, and French Catholics were given custody of holy places. The capitulations were again renewed in 1604, and lasted until the establishment of the Republic of Turkey in 1923.

===== Military and financial agreements =====
Jean de la Forêt also had secret military instructions to organize a combined offensive on Italy in 1535. Through the negotiations of de La Forêt with Grand Vizier Ibrahim Pasha it was agreed that combined military operations against Italy would take place, in which France would attack Lombardy while the Ottoman Empire would attack from Naples. The Ottoman Empire also provided considerable financial support to Francis I. In 1533, Suleiman sent Francis I 100,000 gold pieces, so that he could form a coalition with England and German states against Charles V. In 1535, Francis asked for another 1 million ducats. The military instructions of Jean de la Forêt were highly specific:

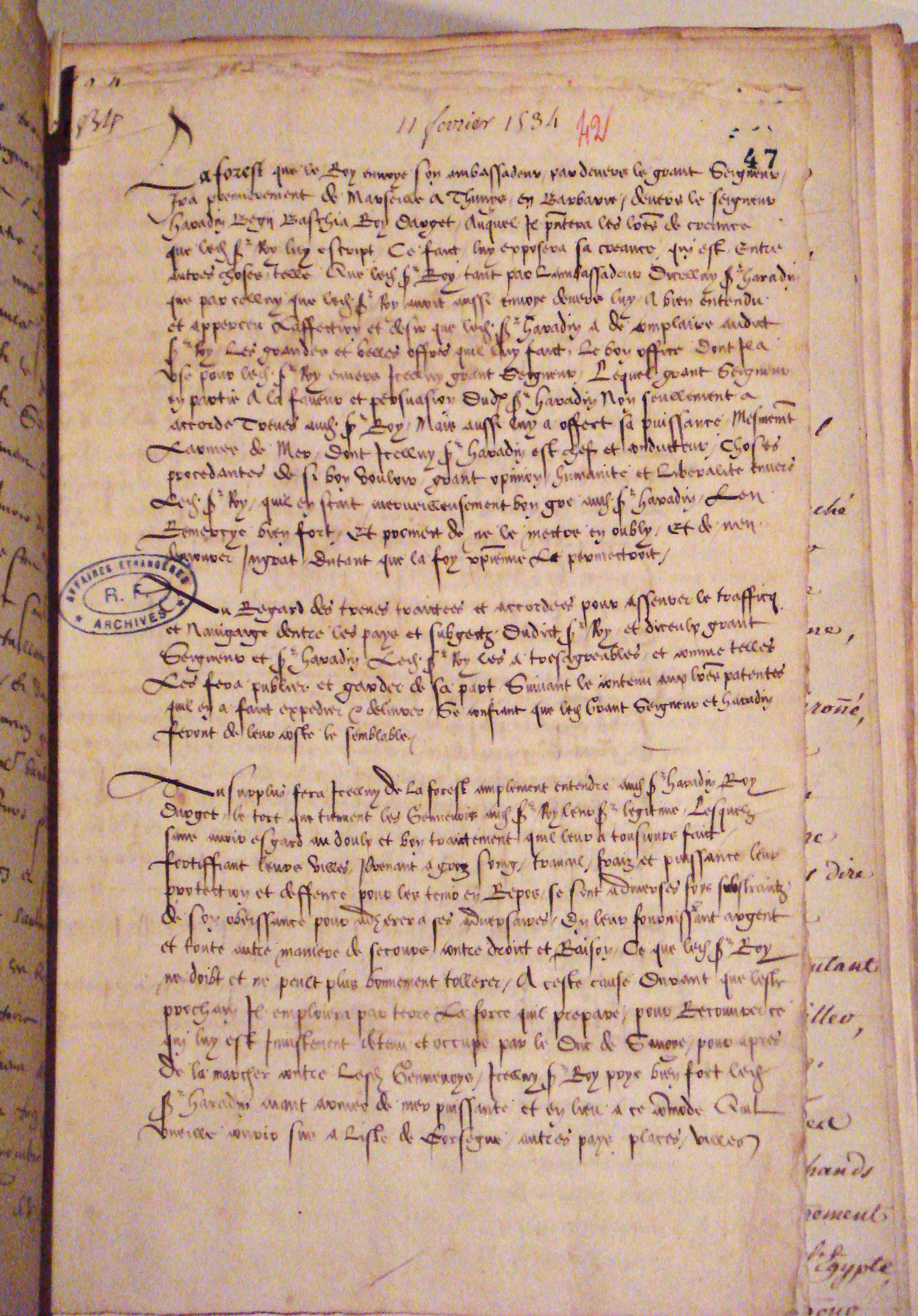
Military instructions to Jean de La Forêt, by Chancellor Antoine Duprat (copy), 11 February 1535.

Jean de la Forest, whom the King sends to meet with the Grand Signor [Suleiman the Magnificent], will first go from Marseille to Tunis, in Barbary, to meet sir Haradin, king of Algiers, who will direct him to the Grand Signor. To this objective, next summer, he [the King of France] with send the military force he is preparing to recover what it unjustly occupied by the Duke of Savoy, and from there, to attack the Genoese. This king Francis I strongly prays sir Haradin, who has a powerful naval force as well as a convenient location [Tunisia], to attack the island of Corsica and other lands, locations, cities, ships and subjects of Genoa, and not to stop until they have accepted and recognized the king of France. The King, besides the above land force, will additionally help with his naval force, which will comprise at least 50 vessels, of which 30 galleys, and the rest galeasses and other vessels, accompanied by one of the largest and most beautiful carracks that ever was on the sea. This fleet will accompany and escort the army of sir Haradin, which will also be refreshed and supplied with food and ammunition by the King, who, by these actions, will be able to achieve his aims, for which he will be highly grateful to sir Haradin. ... To the Grand Signor, Monsieur de La Forest must ask for 1 million in gold, and for his army to enter first in Sicily and Sardinia and establish there a king whom La Forest will nominate, a person who has credit and knows well these islands which he will retain in the devotion of, and under the shade and support of the King [of France]. Furthermore, he will recognize this blessing, and send tribute and pension to the Grand Signor to reward him for the financial support he will have provided to the King, as well as the support of his navy which will be fully assisted by the King [of France].

— Military instruction from Francis I to Jean de la Forest, 1535.

Finally, Suleiman intervened diplomatically in favour of Francis on the European scene. He is known to have sent at least one letter to the Protestant princes of Germany to encourage them to ally with Francis I against Charles V. Francis I effectively allied with the Schmalkaldic League against Charles V in 1535.

=== Italian War of 1536–1538 ===
There was Franco-Ottoman military collaboration during the Italian War of 1536–1538 following the 1536 Treaty negotiated by Jean de La Forêt.

==== Campaign of 1536 ====
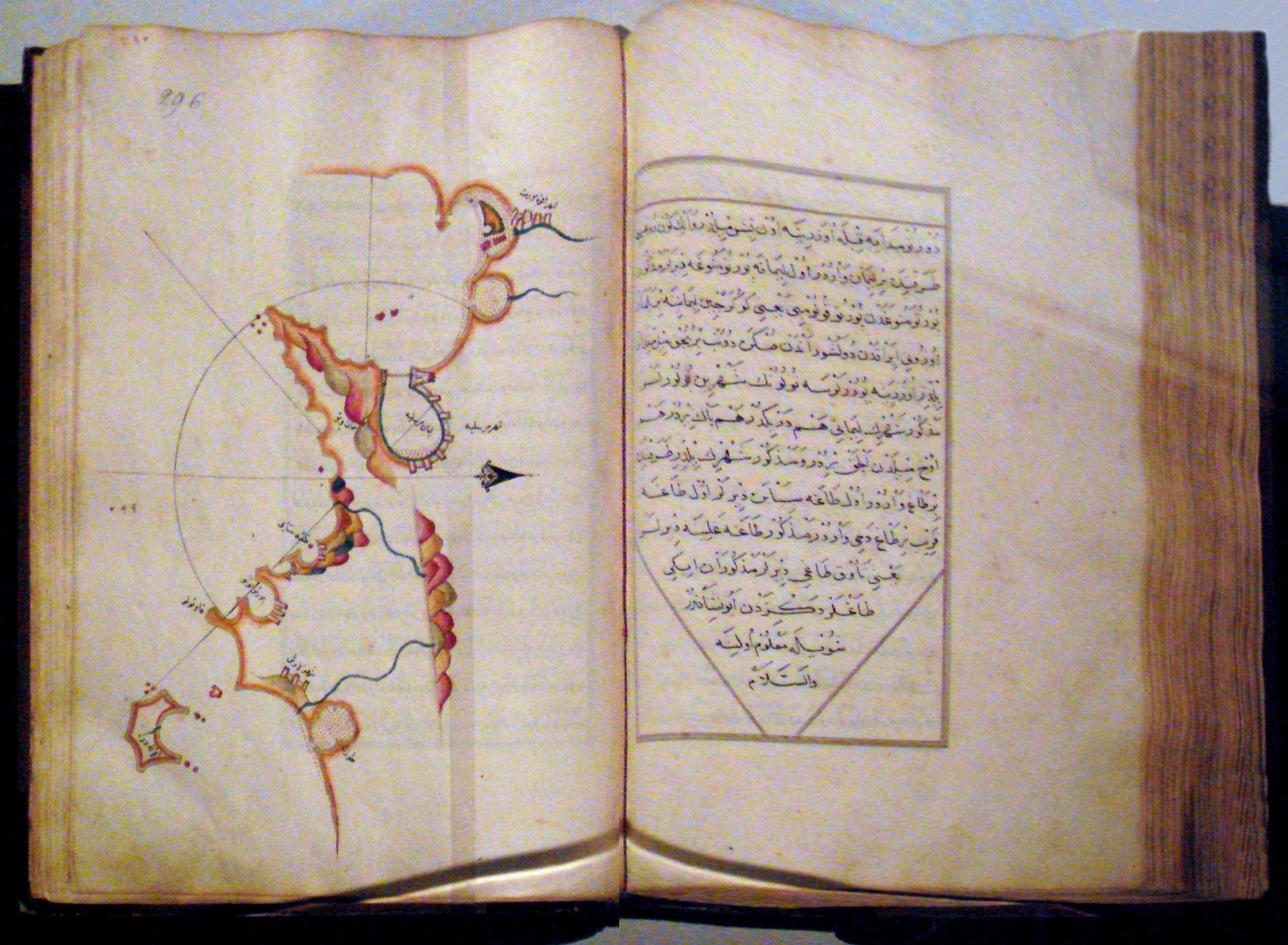
The Harbour of Marseille by Ottoman Admiral Piri Reis 1526.

Francis I invaded Savoy in 1536, starting the war. A Franco-Turkish fleet was stationed in Marseille by the end of 1536, threatening Genoa. While Francis I was attacking Milan and Genoa in April 1536, Barbarossa was raiding the Habsburg possessions in the Mediterranean.

In 1536 the French Admiral Baron de Saint-Blancard combined his twelve French galleys with a small Ottoman fleet (a galley and 6 galiotes) belonging to Barbarossa in Algiers, to attack the island of Ibiza in the Balearic Islands. After failing to capture the tower of Salé, the fleet raided the Spanish coast from Tortosa to Collioure, finally wintering in Marseille with 30 galleys from 15 October 1536, the first time a Turkish fleet had laid up for the winter in Marseille.

==== Joint campaign of 1537 ====
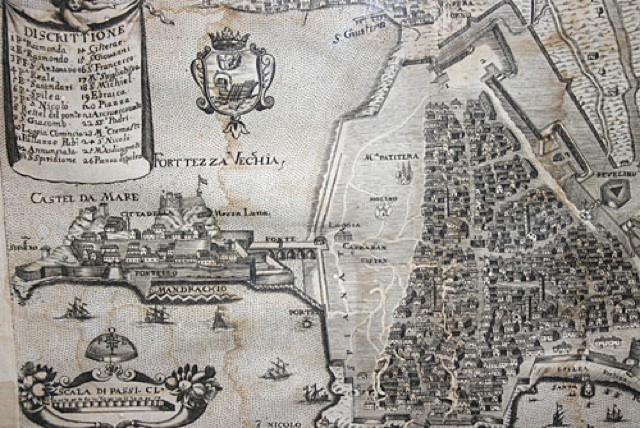
The French and Ottoman fleets joined at the siege of Corfu (1537) in early September.

For 1537 important combined operations were agreed upon, in which the Ottomans would attack southern Italy and Naples under Barbarossa, and Francis I would attack northern Italy with 50,000 men. Suleiman led an army of 300,000 from Constantinople to Albania, with the objective of transporting them to Italy with the fleet. The Ottoman fleet gathered in Avlona with 100 galleys, accompanied by the French ambassador Jean de La Forêt. They landed in Castro, Apulia by the end of July 1537, and departed two weeks later with many prisoners. Barbarossa had laid waste to the region around Otranto, taking about 10,000 people into slavery. Francis however failed to meet his commitment, and instead attacked the Netherlands.

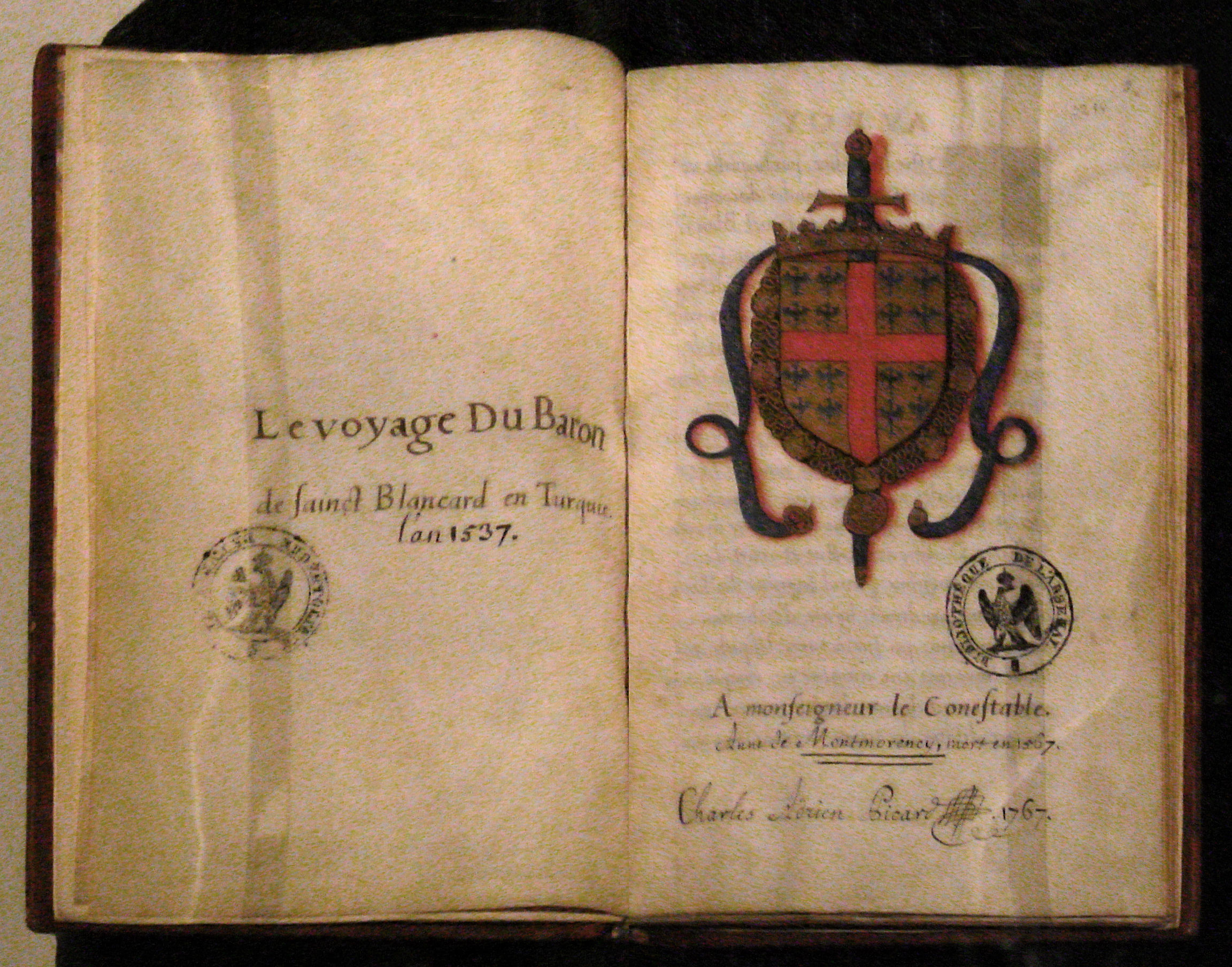
Le Voyage du Baron de Saint Blancard en Turquie, by Jean de la Vega, after 1538.

The Ottomans departed from Southern Italy, and instead mounted the siege of Corfu in August 1537. where they were met by the French Admiral Baron de Saint-Blancard with 12 galleys in early September 1537. Saint-Blancard in vain attempted to convince the Ottomans to again raid the coasts of Apulia, Sicily and the March of Ancona, and Suleiman returned with his fleet to Constantinople by mid-September without having captured Corfu. French ambassador Jean de La Forêt became seriously ill and died around that time. Francis I finally penetrated into Italy, and reached Rivoli on 31 October 1537.

For two years, until 1538, Saint-Blancard accompanied the fleet of Barbarossa, and between 1537 and 1538, he wintered with his galleys in Constantinople and met with Suleiman. During that time, Saint-Blancard was funded by Barbarossa. The campaign of Saint-Blancard with the Ottomans was written down in Le Voyage du Baron de Saint Blancard en Turquie, by Jean de la Vega, who had accompanied Saint-Blancard in his mission. Although the French accompanied most of the campaigns of Barbarossa, they sometimes refrained from participating in Turkish assaults, and their accounts express horror at the violence of these encounters, in which Christians were slaughtered or taken as captives.

==== Habsburg-Valois Truce of Nice (1538) ====
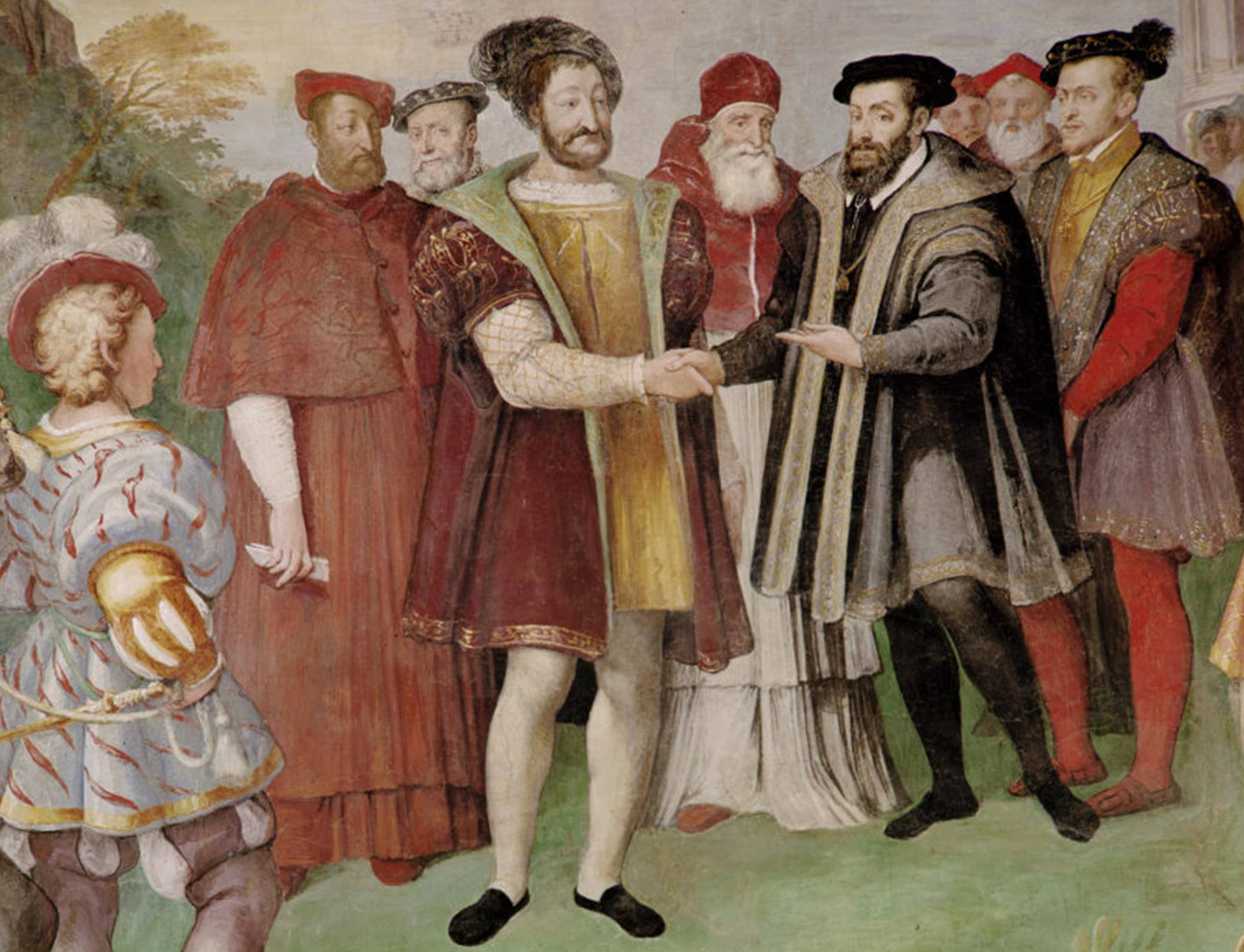
Francis I and Charles V made peace at the Truce of Nice in 1538. Francis actually refused to meet Charles V in person, and the treaty was signed in separate rooms.

With Charles V unsuccessful in battle and squeezed between the French invasion and the Ottomans, he and Francis I ultimately made peace with the Truce of Nice on 18 June 1538. In the truce, Charles and Francis made an agreement to ally against the Ottomans to expel them from Hungary. Charles V turned his attention to fighting the Ottomans, but could not launch large forces in Hungary due to a raging conflict with the German princes of the Schmalkaldic League. On 28 September 1538 Barbarossa won the major Battle of Preveza against the Imperial fleet. At the end of the conflict, Suleiman set as a condition for peace that Charles V return to Francis I the lands that were his by right.

The Franco-Ottoman alliance was crippled for a while however, due to Francis' official change of alliance at Nice in 1538. Open conflict between Charles and Francis, and Franco-Ottoman collaboration, resumed with the 4 July 1541 assassination by Imperial troops of the French Ambassador to the Ottoman Empire Antonio Rincon, as he was travelling through Italy near Pavia.

=== Italian War of 1542–1546 and Hungary Campaign of 1543 ===
During the Italian War of 1542–46 Francis I and Suleiman I were again pitted against the Holy Roman Emperor Charles V, and Henry VIII of England. The course of the war saw extensive fighting in Italy, France, and the Low Countries, as well as attempted invasions of Spain and England; but, although the conflict was ruinously expensive for the major participants, its outcome was inconclusive. In the Mediterranean, there was active naval collaboration between the two powers to fight against Spanish forces, following a request by Francis I, conveyed by Antoine Escalin des Aimars, also known as Captain Polin.

==== Failed coordination in the campaign of 1542 ====
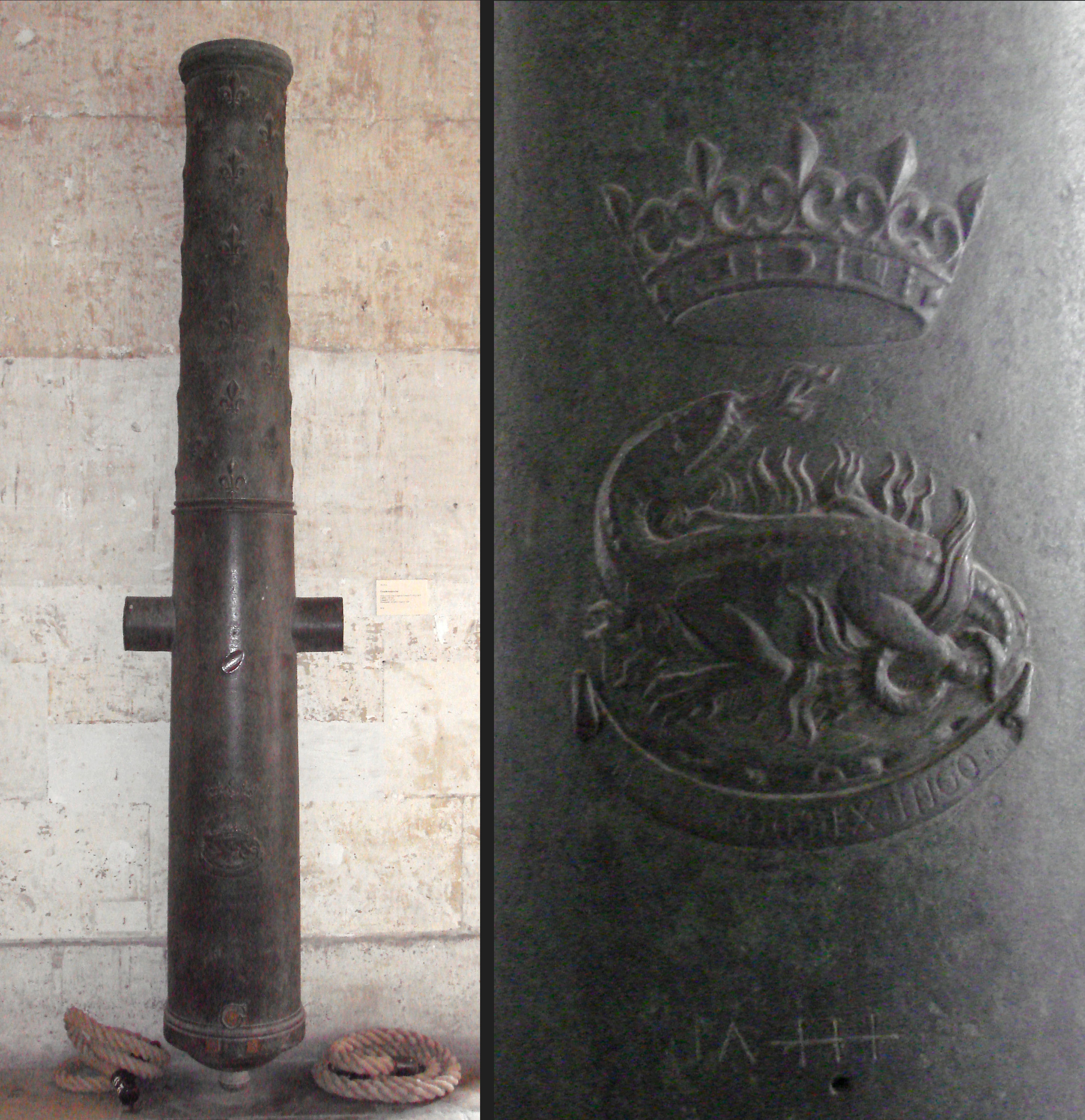
Grand culverin of Francis I, caliber: 140mm, length: 307cm, recovered at the time of the Invasion of Algiers in 1830. Musée de l'Armée, Paris.

In early 1542, Polin successfully negotiated the details of the alliance, with the Ottoman Empire promising to send 60,000 troops against the territories of the German king Ferdinand, as well as 150 galleys against Charles, while France promised to attack Flanders, harass the coasts of Spain with a naval force, and send 40 galleys to assist the Turks for operations in the Levant.

A landing harbour in the north of the Adriatic was prepared for Barbarossa at Marano. The port was seized in the name of France by Piero Strozzi on 2 January 1542.

Polin left Constantinople on 15 February 1542 with a contract from Suleiman outlining the details of the Ottoman commitment for 1542. He arrived in Blois on 8 March 1542 to obtain a ratification of the agreement by Francis I. Accordingly, Francis I designated the city of Perpignan as the objective for the Ottoman expedition, in order to obtain a seaway to Genoa. Polin, after some delays in Venice, finally managed to take a galley to Constantinople on 9 May 1542, but arrived too late for the Ottomans to launch a sea campaign.

Meanwhile, Francis I initiated hostilities with Charles V on 20 July 1542, and kept to his part of the agreement by laying siege to Perpignan and attacking Flanders. André de Montalembert was sent to Constantinople to confirm the Ottoman offensive, but found that Suleiman, partly under the anti-alliance influence of Suleyman Pasha, was unwilling to send an army that year, and promised to send an army twice as strong the following year, in 1543. When Francis I learnt from André de Montalembert that the Ottomans were not coming, he raised the siege of Perpignan.

==== Joint siege of Nice (1543) ====
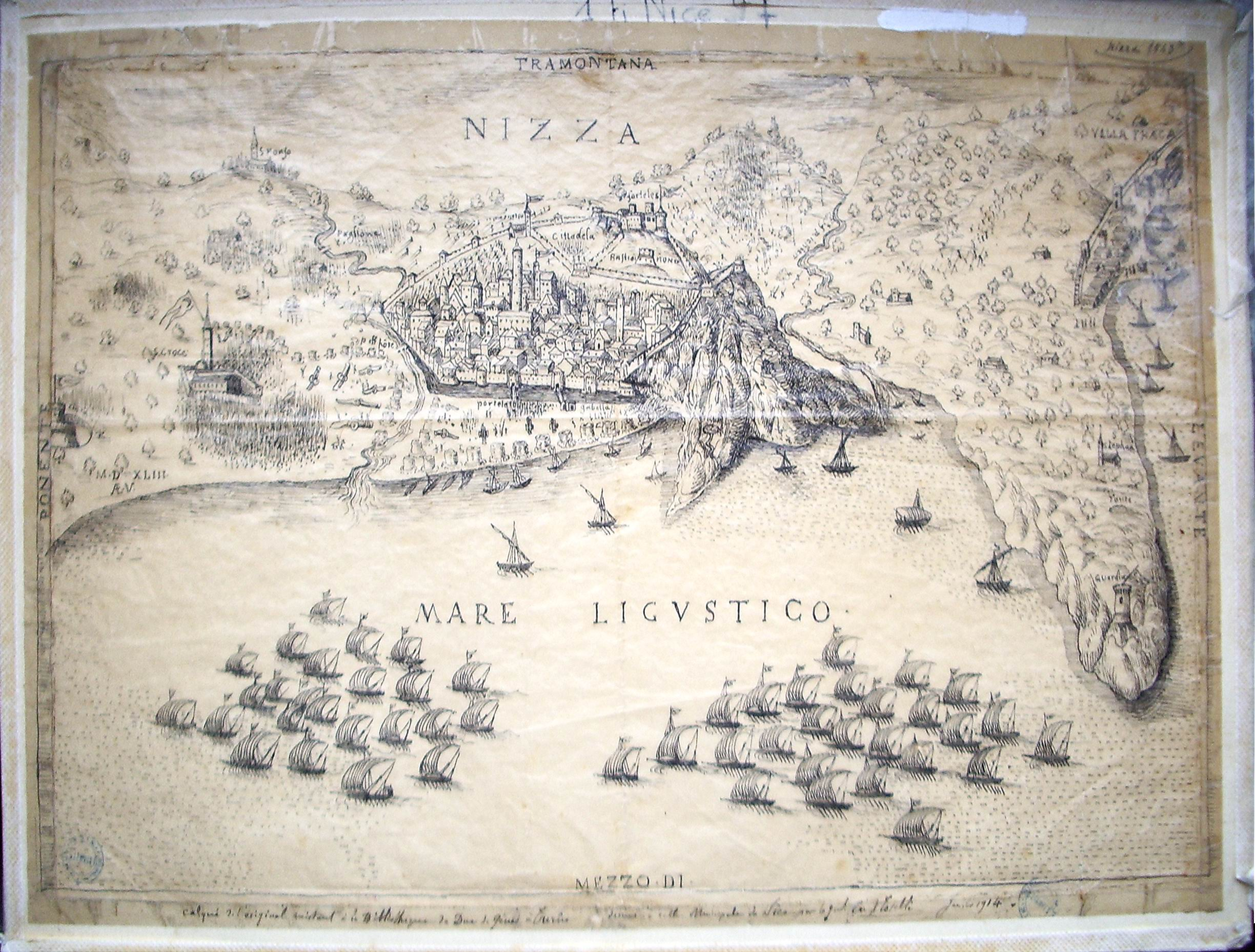
In the siege of Nice in 1543, a combined Franco-Turkish force managed to capture the city.

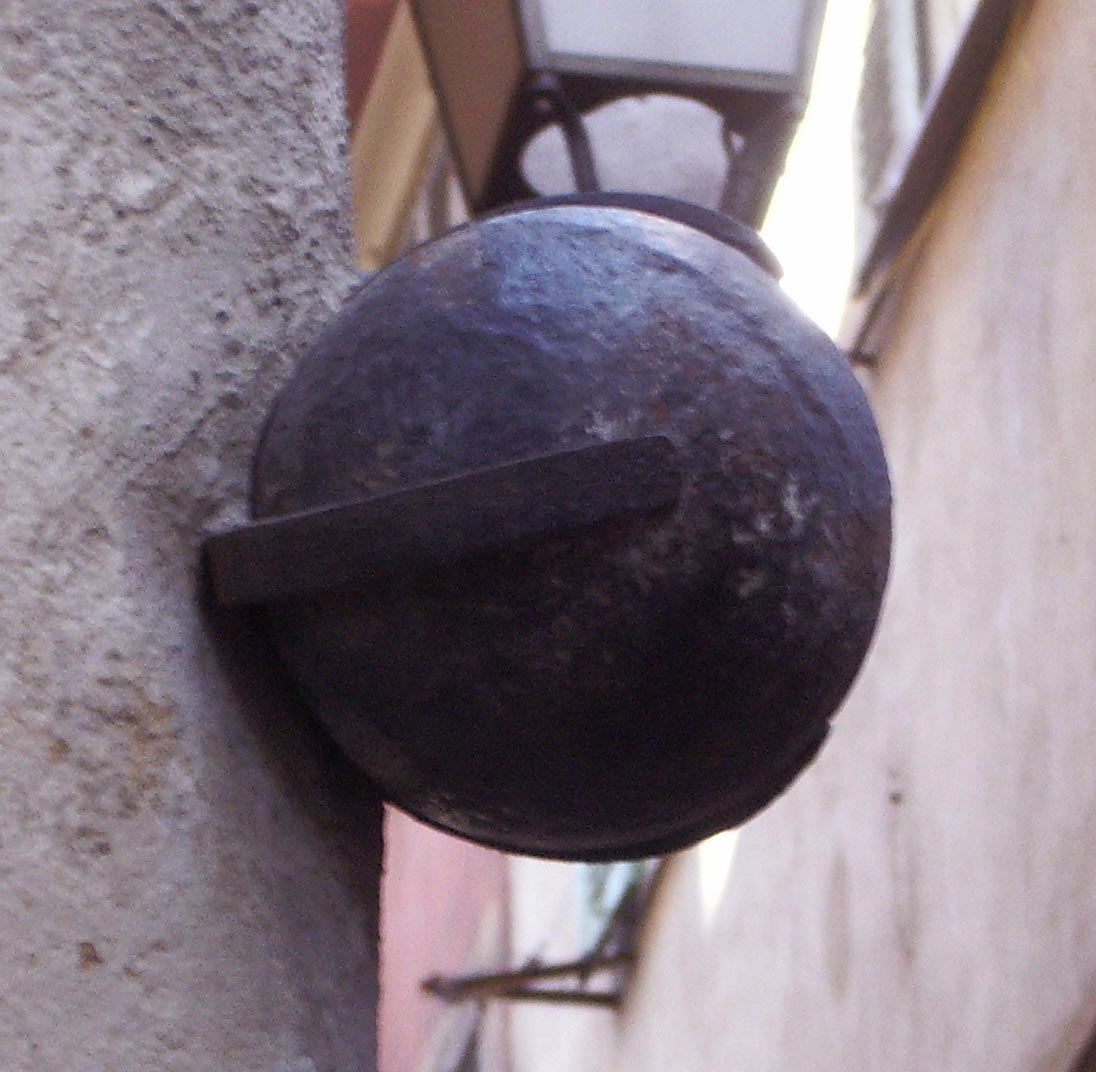
A cannonball fired by the Franco-Turkish fleet, now in a street of Nice

Most notably, the French forces, led by François de Bourbon and the Ottoman forces, led by Barbarossa, joined at Marseille in August 1543, and collaborated to bombard and besiege the city of Nice. In this action 110 Ottoman galleys, with 30,000 men, combined with 50 French galleys. The Franco-Ottomans laid waste to the city of Nice, but were confronted by a stiff resistance which gave rise to the story of Catherine Ségurane. They had to raise the siege of the citadel upon the arrival of enemy troops.

==== Barbarossa wintering in Toulon (1543–1544) ====
After the siege of Nice, the Ottomans were offered by Francis to winter at Toulon, so that they could continue to harass the Holy Roman Empire, especially the coast of Spain and Italy and communications between the two countries:

Lodge the Lord Barbarossa sent to the king by the Great Turk, with his Turkish Army and grands seigneurs to the number of 30,000 combatants during the winter in his town and port of Toulon... for the accommodation of the said army as well as the well-being of all his coast, it will not be suitable for the inhabitants of Toulon to remain and mingle with the Turkish nation, because of difficulties which might arise

— Instruction of Francis I to his Lord Lieutenant of Provence.

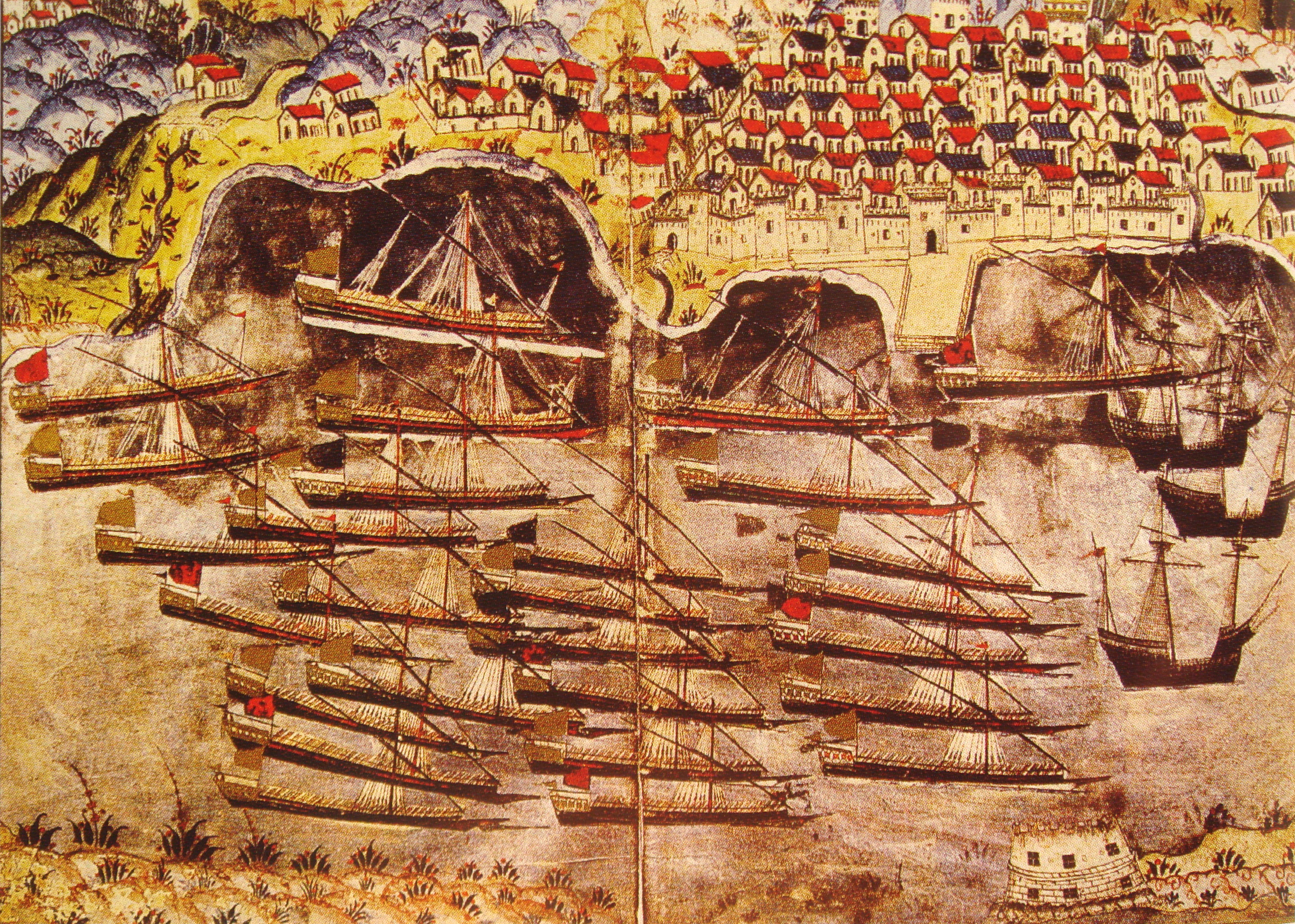
Barbarossa's fleet wintering in the French harbour of Toulon, 1543. (by: Matrakçı Nasuh)

While Barbarossa was wintering, the Toulon Cathedral was transformed into a mosque, the call to prayer occurred five times a day, and Ottoman coinage was the currency of choice. According to an observer: "To see Toulon, one might imagine oneself at Constantinople".

Throughout the winter, the Ottomans were able to use Toulon as a base to attack the Spanish and Italian coasts, raiding Sanremo, Borghetto Santo Spirito, Ceriale and defeating Italo-Spanish naval attacks. Sailing with his whole fleet to Genoa, Barbarossa negotiated with Andrea Doria the release of Turgut Reis. The Ottomans departed from their Toulon base in May 1544 after Francis I had paid 800,000 ecus to Barbarossa.

==== Captain Polin in Constantinople (1544) ====
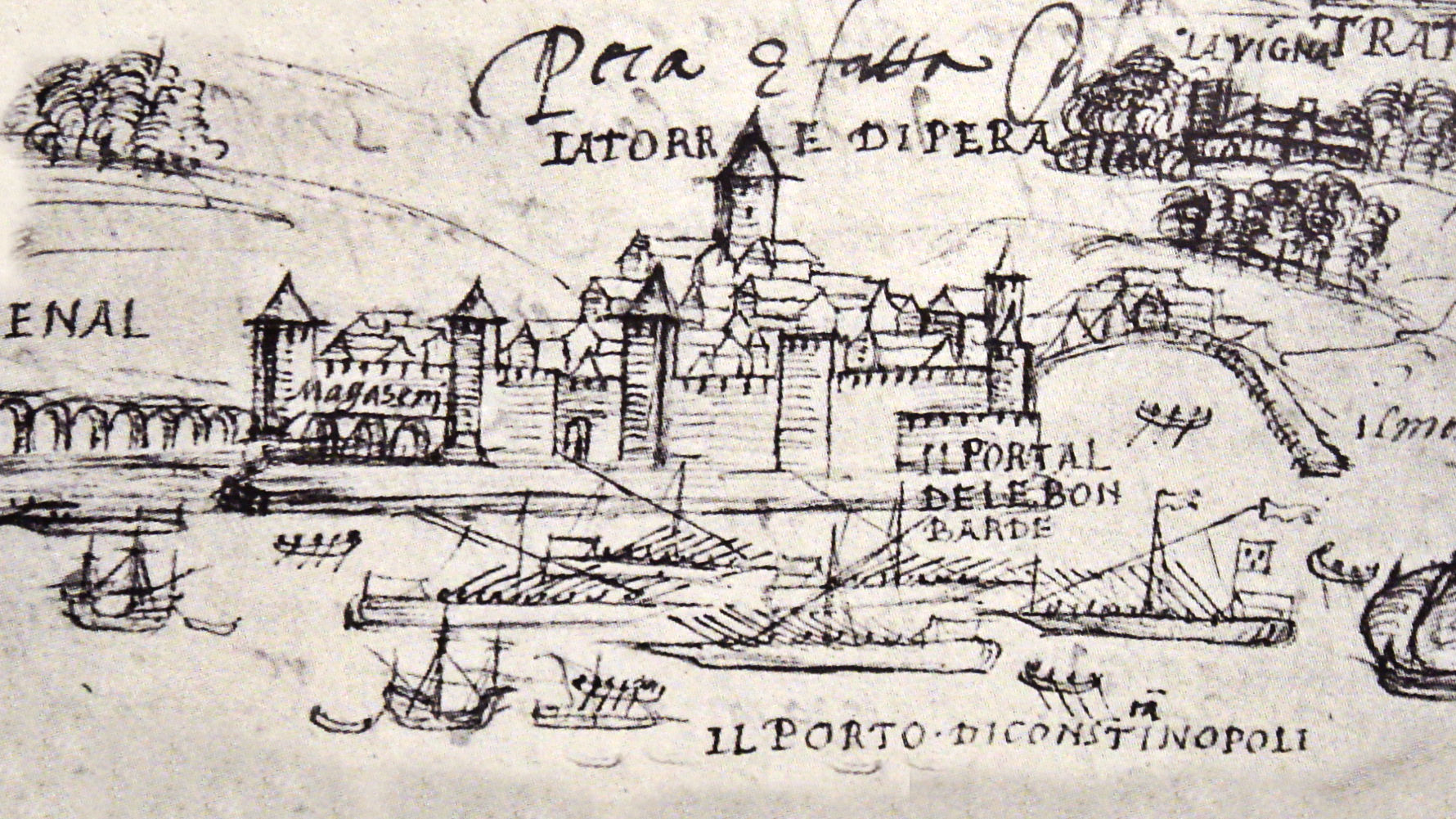
The French galleys of Captain Polin in front of Pera at Constantinople in August 1544, drawn by Jerôme Maurand, a priest who accompanied the fleet.

Five French galleys under Captain Polin, including the superb Réale, accompanied Barbarossa's fleet, on a diplomatic mission to Suleiman. The French fleet accompanied Barbarossa during his attacks on the west coast of Italy on the way to Constantinople, as he laid waste to the cities of Porto Ercole, Giglio, Talamona, and Lipari, and took about 6,000 captives, but separated in Sicily from Barbarossa's fleet to continue alone to the Ottoman capital. Jerôme Maurand, a priest of Antibes who accompanied Polin and the Ottoman fleet in 1544, wrote a detailed account in Itinéraire d'Antibes à Constantinonple. They arrived in Constantinople on 10 August 1544 to meet with Suleiman and give him an account of the campaign. Polin was back in Toulon on 2 October 1544.

==== Joint campaign in Hungary (1543–1544) ====
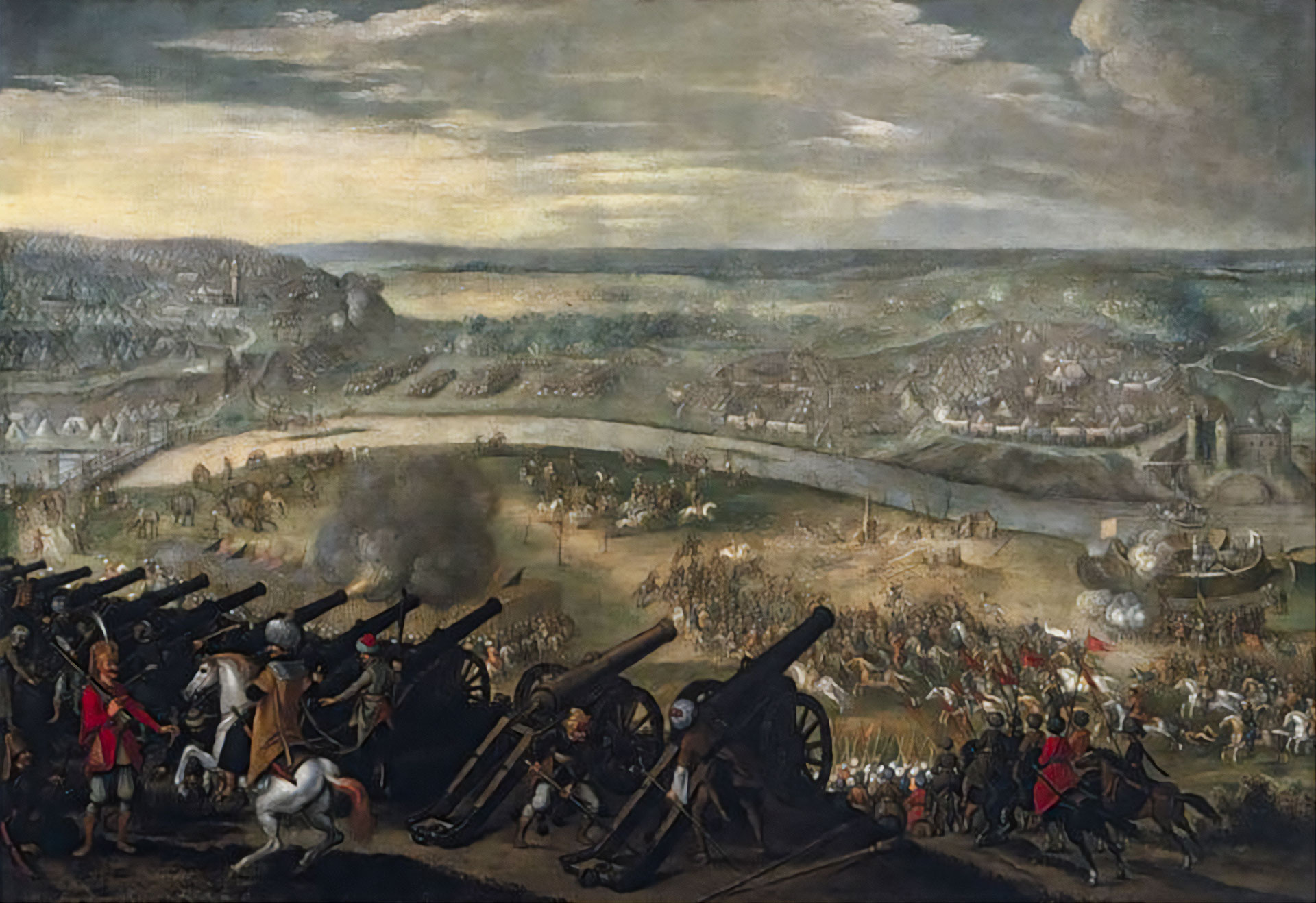
French artillery troops were supplied to Suleiman for his Hungarian campaign – here, the siege of Esztergom (1543).

On land Suleiman was concomitantly fighting for the conquest of Hungary in 1543, as a part of the Little War. French troops were supplied to the Ottomans on the Central European front; in Hungary, a French artillery unit dispatched in 1543–1544 was attached to the Ottoman Army. Following major sieges such as the siege of Esztergom (1543), Suleiman took a commanding position in Hungary, obtaining the signature of the Truce of Adrianople with the Habsburg in 1547.

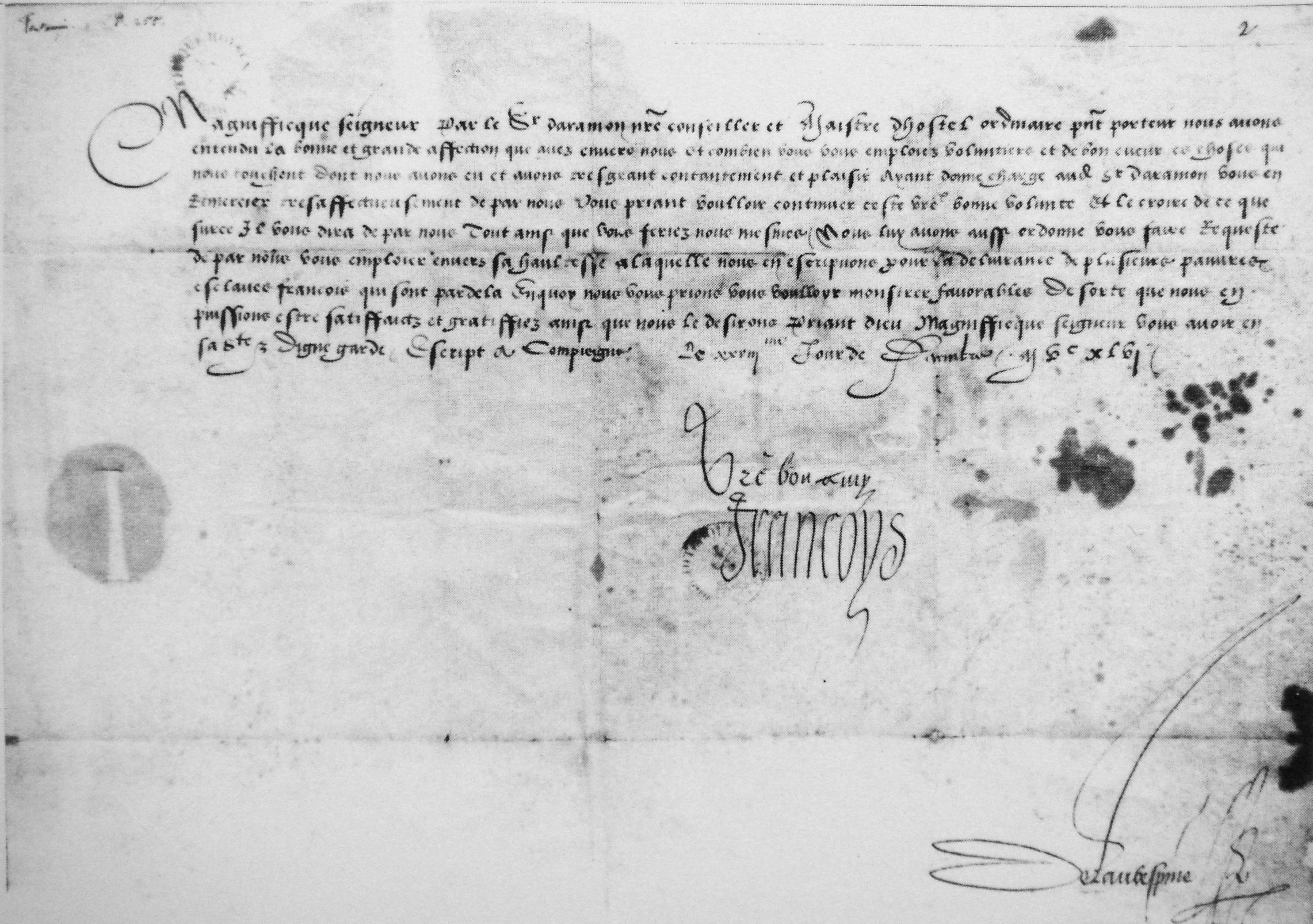
Letter of Francis I to the Drogman Janus Bey, 28 December 1546, delivered by D'Aramon. The letter is countersigned by the State Secretary Claude de L'Aubespine (bottom right corner).

Besides the powerful effect of a strategic alliance encircling the Habsburg Empire, combined tactical operations were significantly hampered by the distances involved, the difficulties in communication, and the unpredictable changes of plans on one side or the other. From a financial standpoint, fiscal revenues were also generated for both powers through the ransoming of enemy ships in the Mediterranean. The French Royal House also borrowed large amounts of gold from the Ottoman banker Joseph Nasi and the Ottoman Empire, amounting to around 150,000 écus as of 1565, the repayment of which became contentious in the following years.

==== French support in the Ottoman-Safavid war (1547) ====
In 1547, when Sultan Suleiman I attacked Persia in his second campaign of the Ottoman-Safavid War (1532–1555), France sent him the ambassador Gabriel de Luetz to accompany him in his campaign. Gabriel de Luetz was able to give decisive military advice to Suleiman, as when he advised on artillery placement during the Siege of Van.

=== Consequences ===
The alliance provided strategic support to, and effectively protected, the kingdom of France from the ambitions of Charles V. It also gave the opportunity for the Ottoman Empire to become involved in European diplomacy and gain prestige in its European dominions. According to historian Arthur Hassall the consequences of the Franco-Ottoman alliance were far-reaching: "The Ottoman alliance had powerfully contributed to save France from the grasp of Charles V, it had certainly aided Protestantism in Germany, and from a French point of view, it had rescued the North German allies of Francis I."

==== Political debate ====
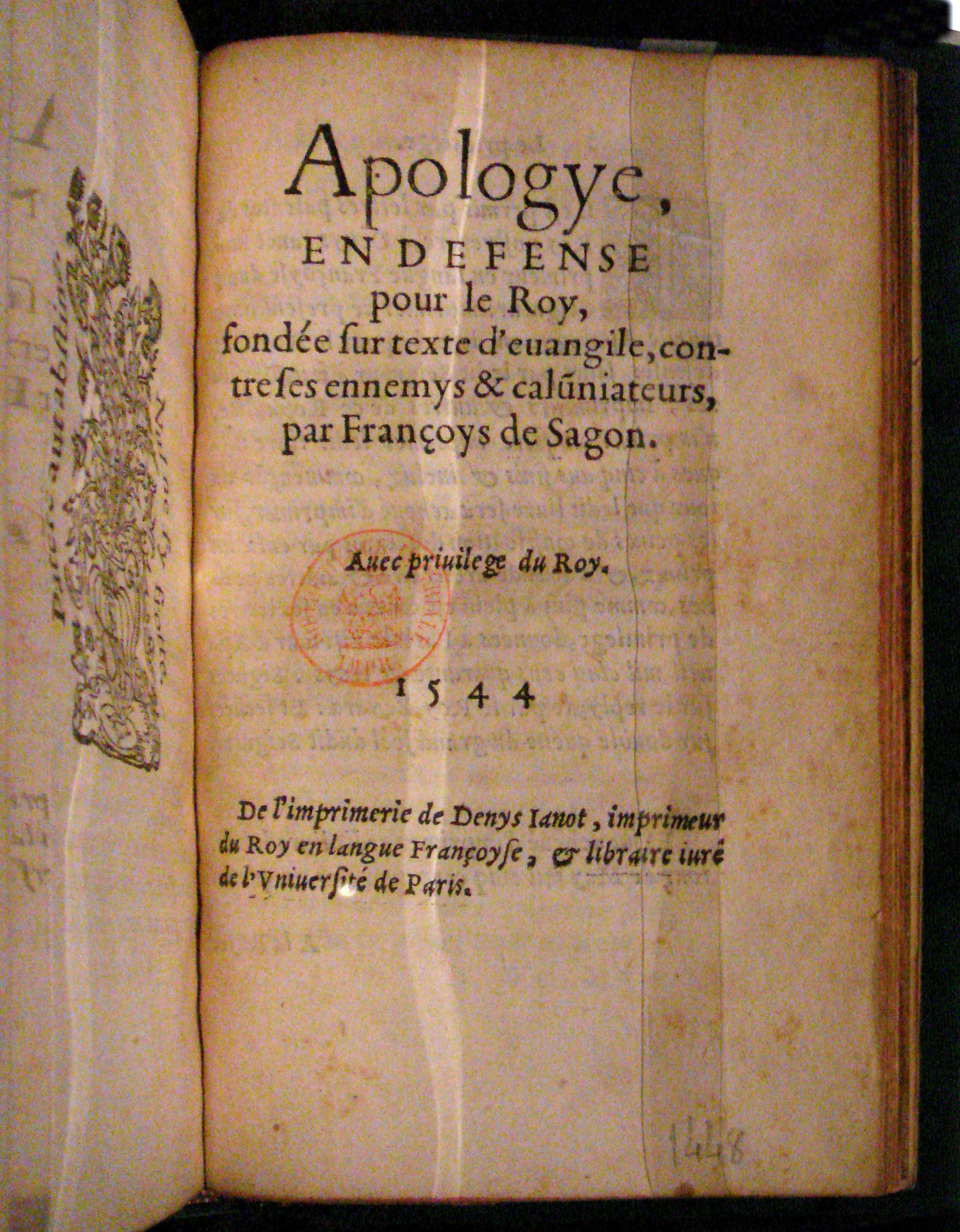
Apologye en défense pour le Roy, fondée sur texte d'évangile, contre ses enemis et calomniateurs by François de Sagon, 1544.

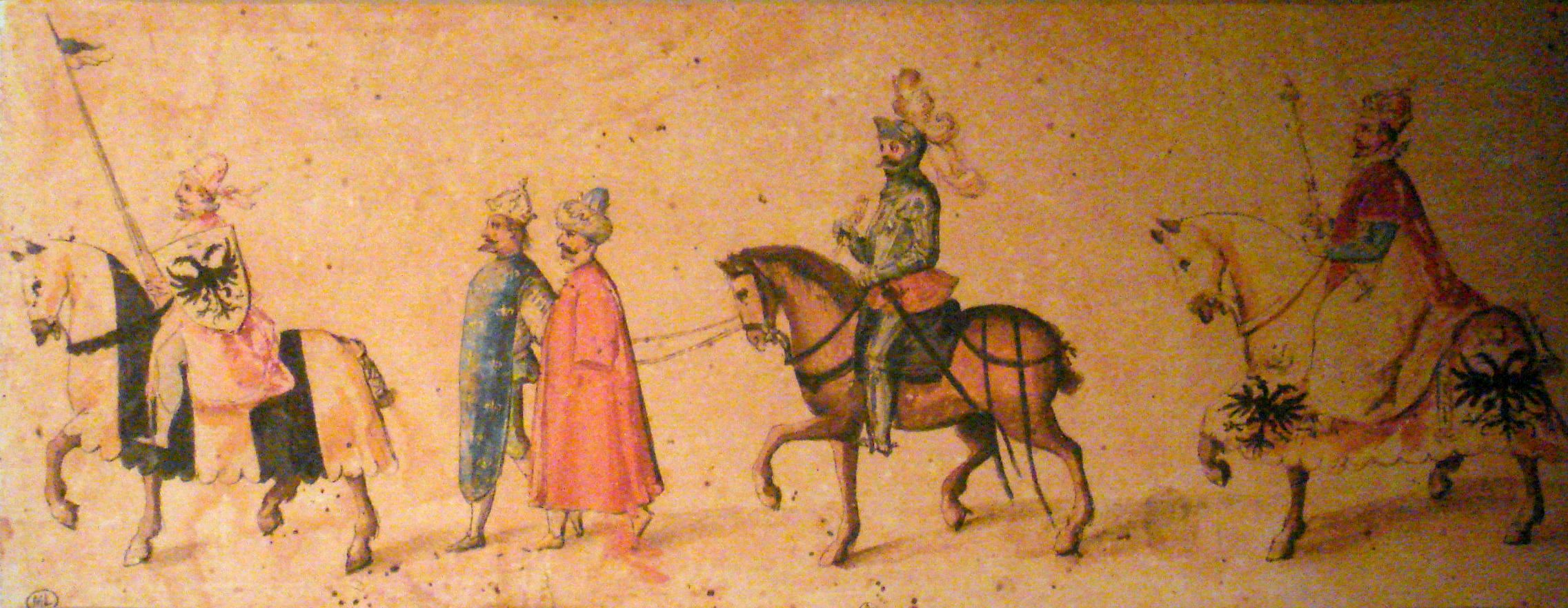
Caricature showing the Emperor conducting the king of France and the Sultan walking as captives bound together. Early 17th century.

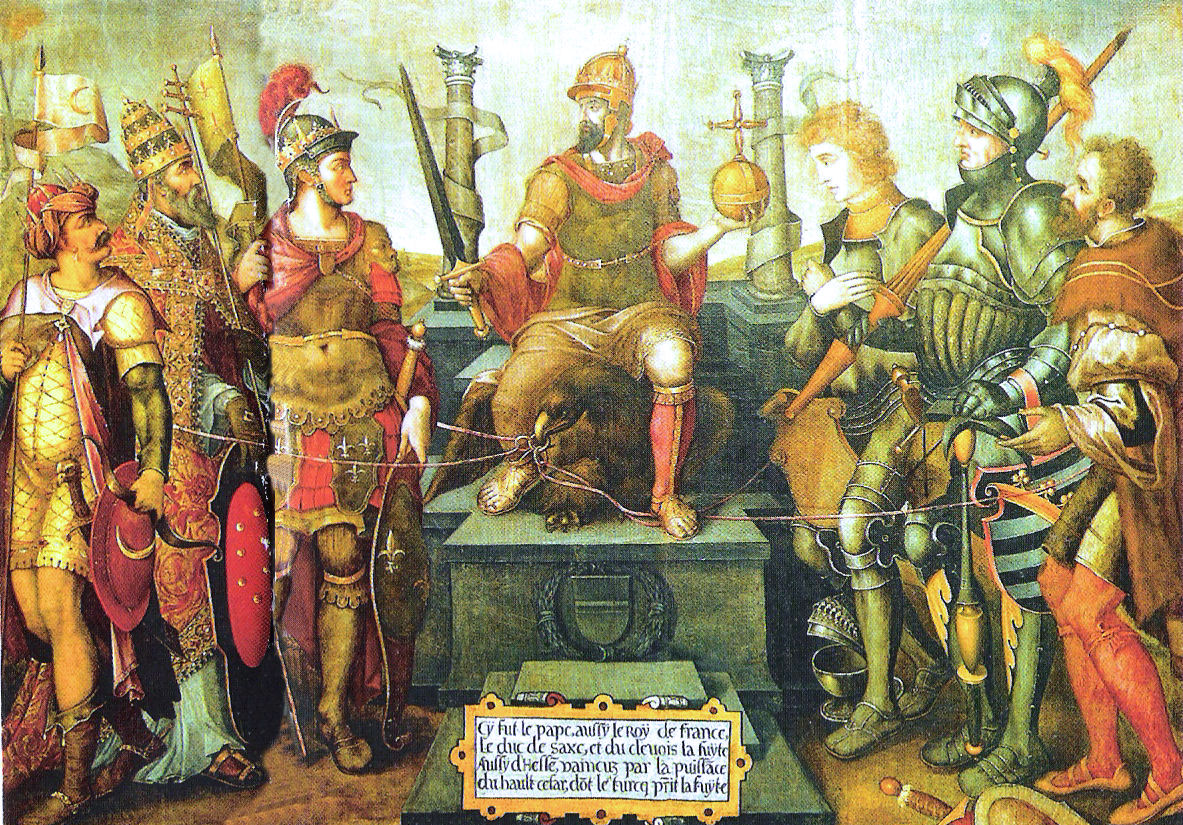
Allegory showing Charles Quint (center) enthroned over his defeated enemies (from left to right): Suleiman, Pope Clement VII, Francis I, the Duke of Cleves, the Duke of Saxony and the Landgrave of Hesse.

Side effects included a lot of negative propaganda against the actions of France and its "unholy" alliance with a Muslim power. Charles V strongly appealed to the rest of Europe against the alliance of Francis I, and caricatures were made showing the collusion between France and the Ottoman Empire. In the late sixteenth century, Italian political philosopher Giovanni Botero referred to the alliance as "a vile, infamous, diabolical treaty" and blamed it for the extinction of the Valois dynasty. Even the French Huguenot Francois de La Noue denounced the alliance in a 1587 work, claiming that "this confederation has been the occasion to diminish the glory and power of such a flourishing kingdom as France."

Numerous authors intervened to take the defense of the French king for his alliance. Authors wrote about the Ottoman civilization, such as Guillaume Postel or Christophe Richer, in sometimes extremely positive ways. In the 1543 work Les Gestes de Francoys de Valois, Etienne Dolet justified the alliance by comparing it to Charles V's relations with Persia and Tunis. Dolet also claimed that it should not be "forbidden for a prince to make alliance and seek intelligence of another, whatever creed or law he may be." The author François de Sagon wrote in 1544 Apologye en défense pour le Roy, a text defending the actions of Francis I by drawing parallels with the parable of the Good Samaritan in the Bible, in which Francis is compared to the wounded man, the Emperor to the thieves, and Suleiman to the Good Samaritan providing help to Francis. Guillaume du Bellay and his brother Jean du Bellay wrote in defense of the alliance, at the same time minimizing it and legitimizing on the ground that Francis I was defending himself against an aggression. Jean de Montluc used examples from Christian history to justify the endeavour to obtain Ottoman support. Jean de Montluc's brother Blaise de Montluc argued in 1540 that the alliance was permissible because "against one's enemies one can make arrows of any kind of wood." In 1551, Pierre Danes wrote Apologie, faicte par un serviteur du Roy, contre les calomnies des Impériaulx: sur la descente du Turc.

==== Cultural and scientific exchanges ====
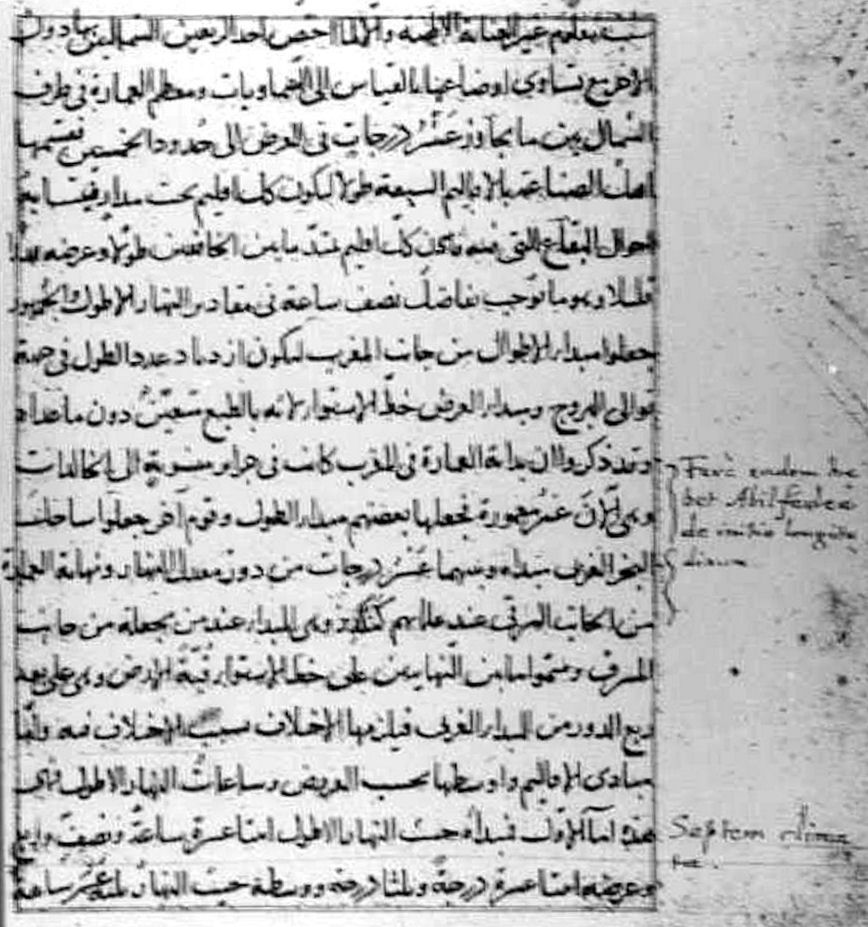
Arabic astronomical manuscript of Nasir al-Din al-Tusi, annotated by Guillaume Postel.

Cultural and scientific exchanges between France and the Ottoman Empire flourished. French scholars such as Guillaume Postel or Pierre Belon were able to travel to Asia Minor and the Middle East to collect information.

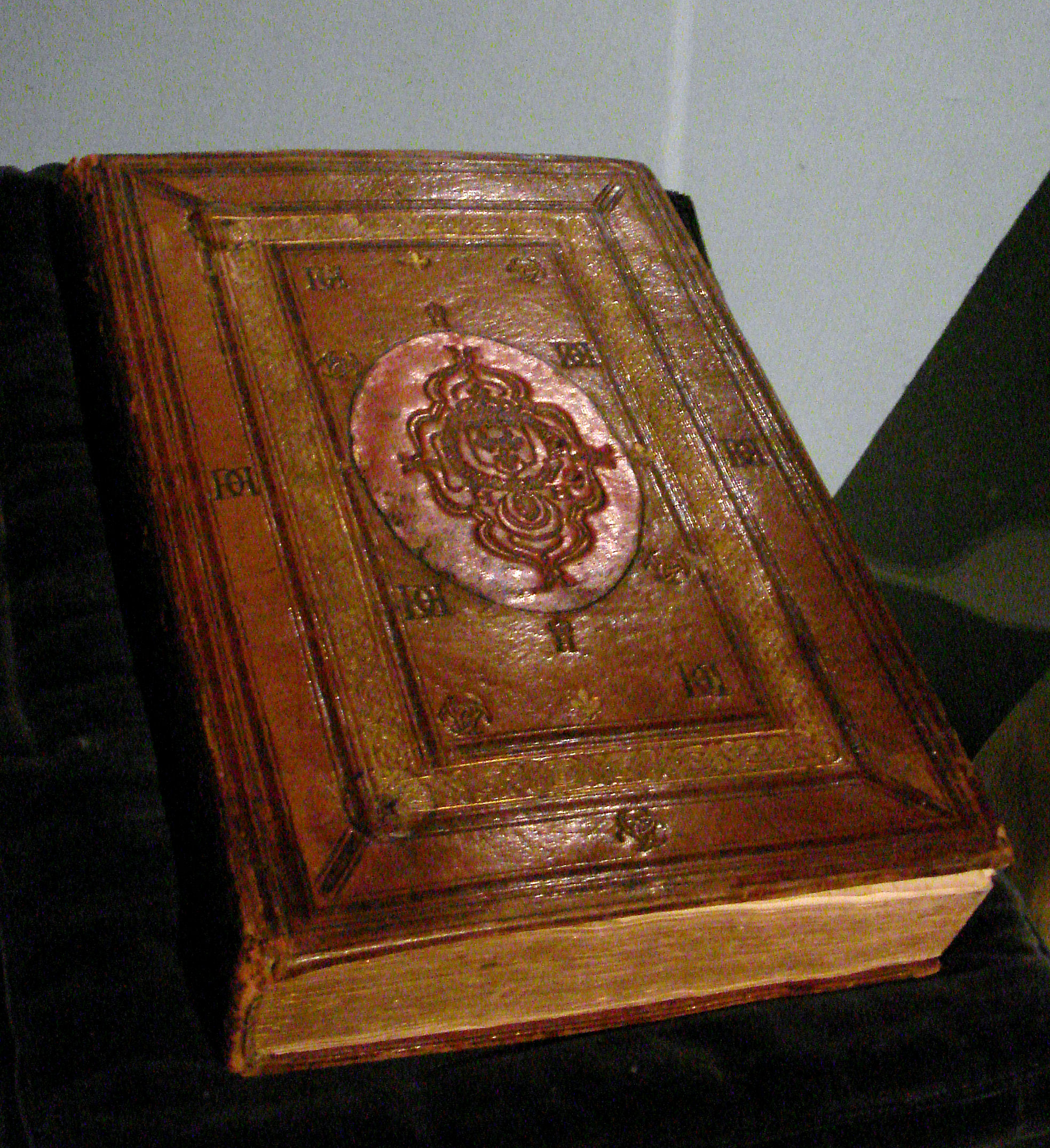
Ottoman Empire Quran, copied circa 1536, bound according to regulations set under Francis I circa 1549, with arms of Henri II. Bibliothèque Nationale de France.

Scientific exchange is thought to have occurred, as numerous works in Arabic, especially pertaining to astronomy were brought back, annotated and studied by scholars such as Guillaume Postel. Transmission of scientific knowledge, such as the Tusi-couple, may have occurred on such occasions, at the time when Copernicus was establishing his own astronomical theories.

Books, such as the Muslim holy text, the Quran, were brought back to be integrated in Royal libraries, such as the Bibliothèque Royale de Fontainebleau, to create a foundation for the Collège des lecteurs royaux, future Collège de France. French novels and tragedies were written with the Ottoman Empire as a theme or background. In 1561, Gabriel Bounin published La Soltane, a tragedy highlighting the role of Roxelane in the 1553 execution of Mustapha, the elder son of Suleiman. This tragedy marks the first time the Ottomans were introduced on stage in France.

==== International trade ====
Strategically, the alliance with the Ottoman Empire also allowed France to offset to some extent the Habsburg Empire's advantage in the New World trade, and French trade with the eastern Mediterranean through Marseille indeed increased considerably after 1535. After the Capitulations of 1569, France also gained precedence over all other Christian states, and her authorization was required for when another state wished to trade with the Ottoman Empire.

== Military alliance under Henry II ==
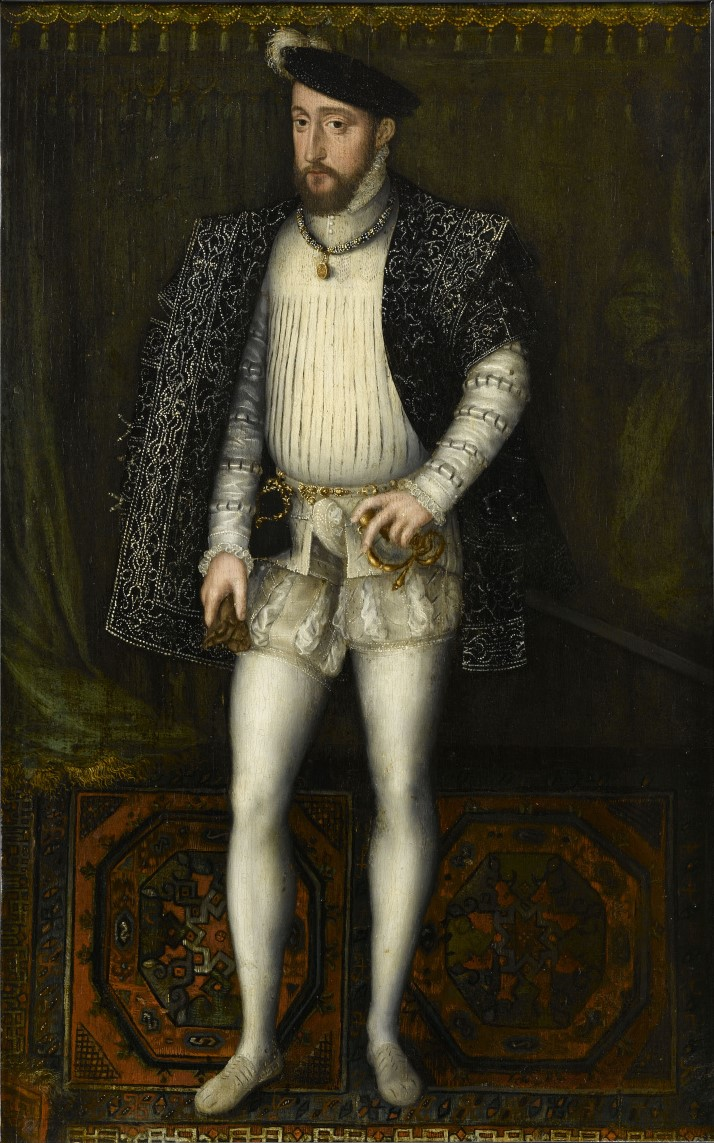
Henry II, here standing on an oriental carpet, an example of Oriental carpets in Renaissance painting, continued the policy of alliance of his father Francis I. Painting by François Clouet.

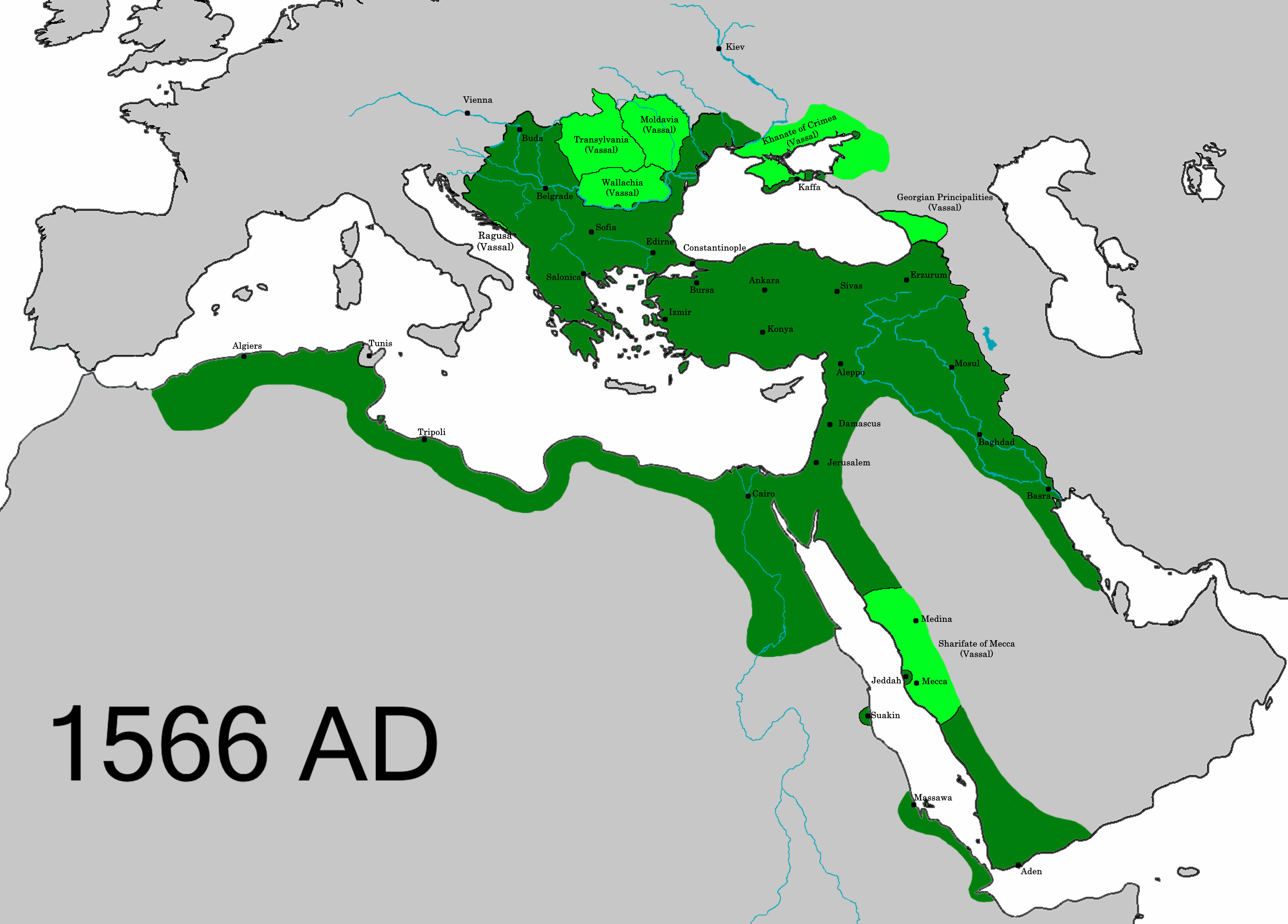
Territory of the Ottoman Empire upon the death of Suleiman the Magnificent.

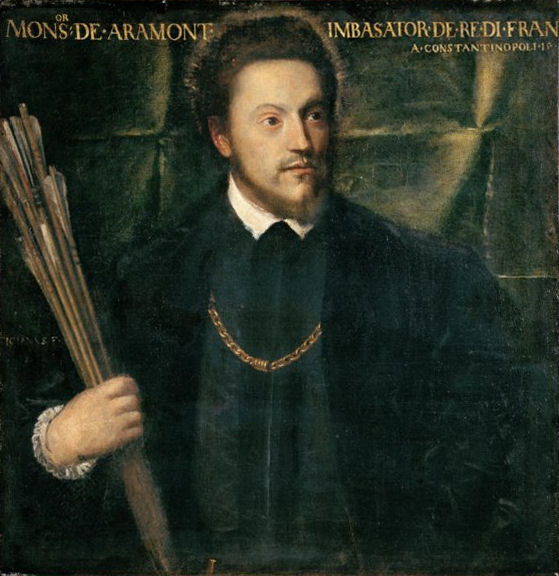
French ambassador to the Ottoman Porte Gabriel de Luetz d'Aramont, was present at the 1551 siege of Tripoli as well as later Ottoman campaigns. Painting by Titian.

The son of Francis I, Henry II, also sealed a treaty with Suleyman in order to cooperate against the Austrian Navy. This was triggered by the 8 September 1550 conquest of Mahdiya by the Genoese Admiral Andrea Doria on behalf of Charles V. The alliance allowed Henry II to push for French conquests towards the Rhine, while a Franco-Ottoman fleet defended southern France.

=== Cooperation during the Italian War of 1551–1559 ===
Various military actions were coordinated during the Italian War of 1551–1559. In 1551, the Ottomans, accompanied by the French ambassador Gabriel de Luez d'Aramon, succeeded in the siege of Tripoli.

==== Joint attacks on the Kingdom of Naples (1552) ====
In 1552, when Henry II attacked Charles V, the Ottomans sent 100 galleys to the Western Mediterranean. The Ottoman fleet was accompanied by three French galleys under Gabriel de Luez d'Aramon, who accompanied the Ottoman fleet from Istanbul in its raids along the coast of Calabria in Southern Italy, capturing the city of Reggio. The plan was to join with the French fleet of Baron de la Garde and the troops of the Prince of Salerno, but both were delayed and could not join the Ottomans in time. In the Battle of Ponza in front of the island of Ponza with 40 galleys of Andrea Doria, the Franco-Ottoman fleet managed to vanquish them and capture 7 galleys on 5 August 1552. The Franco-Ottoman fleet left Naples to go back to the east on 10 August, missing the Baron de la Garde who reached Naples a week later with 25 galleys and troops. The Ottoman fleet then wintered in Chios, where it was joined by the fleet of Baron de la Garde, ready for naval operations the following year.

==== Joint invasion of Corsica (1553) ====
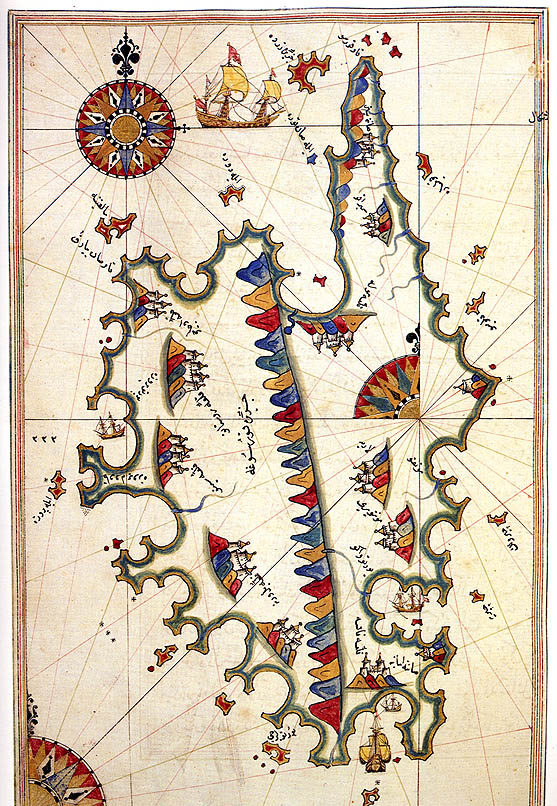
Franco-Ottoman forces invaded Corsica in 1553.

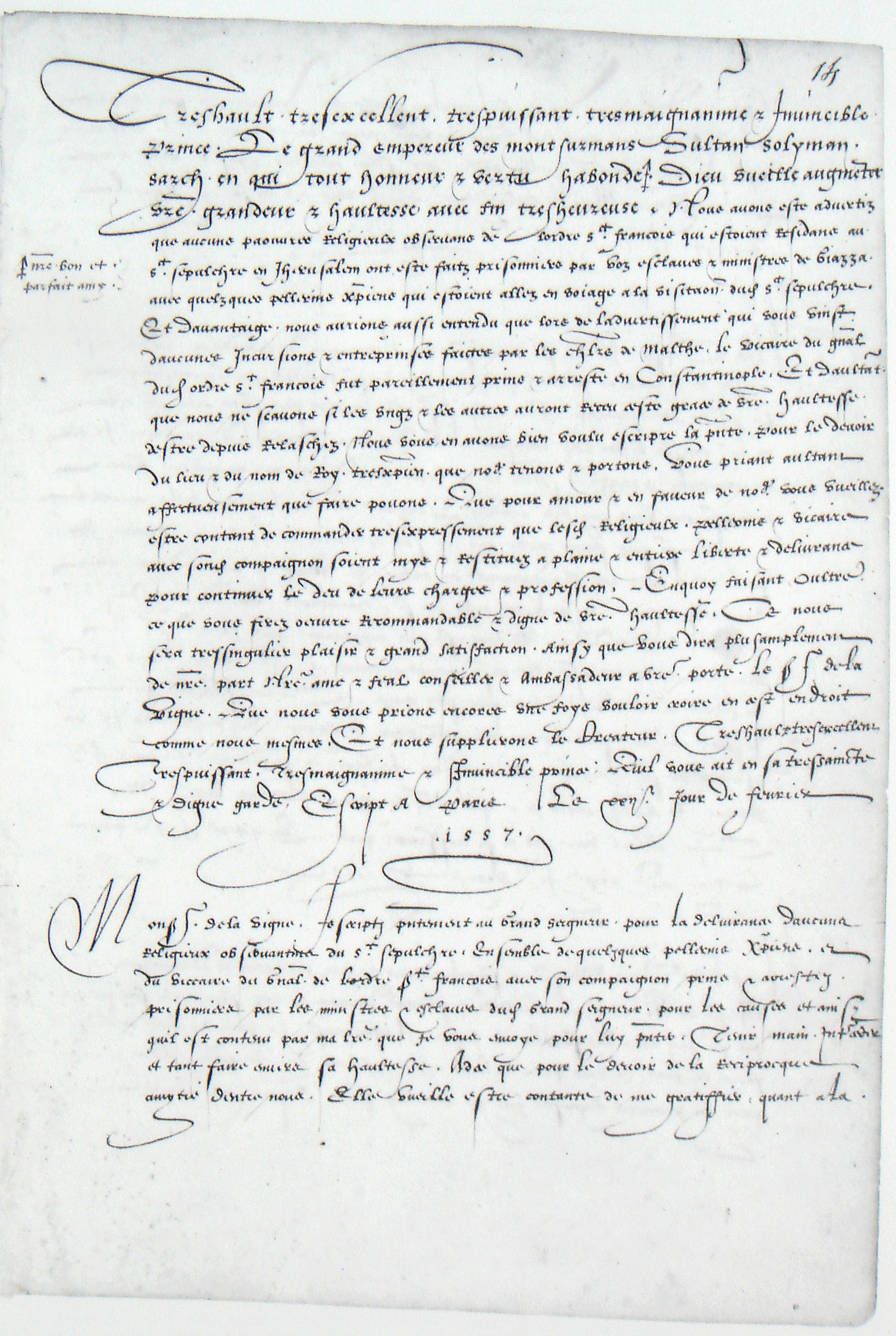
Letter from Henry II of France to Suleiman the Magnificent and ambassador Jean Cavenac de la Vigne, dated 22 February 1557.

On 1 February 1553, a new treaty of alliance, involving naval collaboration against the Habsburg was signed between France and the Ottoman Empire. In 1553, the Ottoman admirals Dragut and Koca Sinan together with the French squadron raided the coasts of Naples, Sicily, Elba and Corsica. A Franco-Ottoman fleet accomplished an Invasion of Corsica for the benefit of France. The military alliance is said to have reached its peak in 1553.

In 1555, the French ambassador Michel de Codignac, successor to Gabriel de Luetz d'Aramon, is known to have participated to Suleiman's Persian campaign, and to have sailed with the Ottoman fleet in its campaign against Piombino, Elba and Corsica. The Ottoman admiral Turgut Reis was one of the key Ottoman protagonists in these actions.

On 30 December 1557, Henry II wrote a letter to Suleiman, asking him for money, saltpeter, and 150 galleys to be stationed in the West. Through the services of his ambassador Jean Cavenac de la Vigne, Henry II obtained the dispatch of an Ottoman fleet to Italy in 1558, with little effect however apart from the sack of Sorrento. The Ottomans also contributed by the Ottoman invasion of the Balearic islands in 1558. The conflict would finally come to an end with the Peace of Cateau-Cambrésis (1559) and the accidental death of Henry II that same year. The newfound peace between the European powers however created long-lasting disillusionment on the Ottoman side.

== Support of Protestantism under Charles IX ==
Ottoman power was also used by the French in the religious conflicts on the European scene. In 1566, under Charles IX, the French ambassador to the Ottoman Empire intervened in favour of the Dutch Revolt against the Spanish Empire, after a request for Ottoman help by William I of Orange, so that a Dutch-Ottoman alliance was considered and a letter was sent from Suleiman the Magnificent to the "Lutherans" in Flanders, offering troops at the time they would request, and claiming that he felt close to them, "since they did not worship idols, believed in one God and fought against the Pope and Emperor". The Ottoman Empire was indeed known at that time for its religious tolerance. Various religious refugees, such as the Huguenots, some Anglicans, Quakers, Anabaptists or even Jesuits or Capuchins and Jews (Marranos) were able to find refuge at Constantinople and in the Ottoman Empire, where they were given right of residence and worship. Further, the Ottomans supported the Calvinists in Transylvania and Hungary but also in France. The contemporary French thinker Jean Bodin wrote:

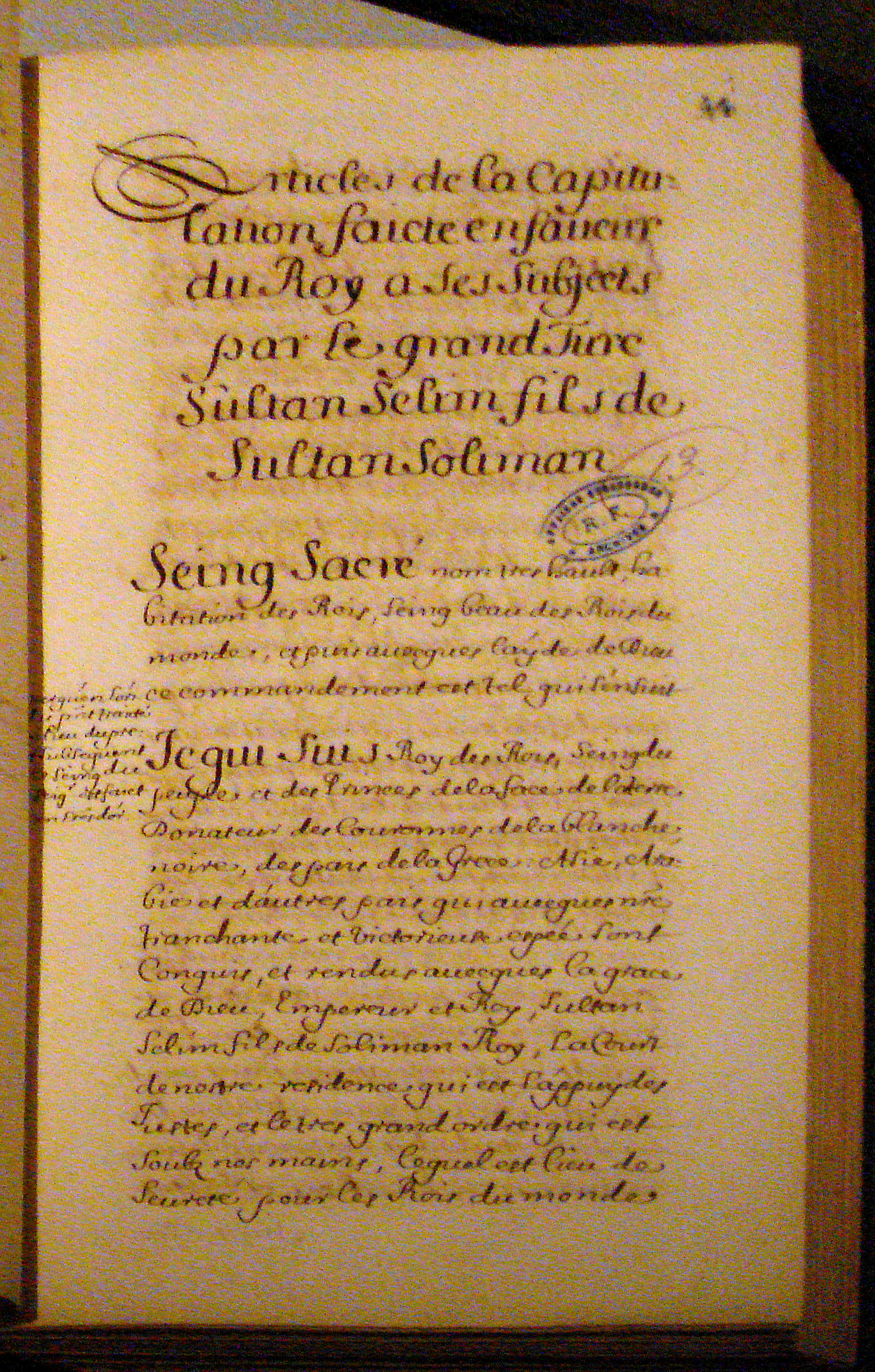
16th century copy of the 1569 Capitulations between Charles IX and Selim II.

The great emperor of the Turks does with as great devotion as any prince in the world honour and observe the religion by him received from his ancestors, and yet detests he not the strange religions of others; but on the contrary permits every man to live according to his conscience: yes, and that more is, near unto his palace at Pera, suffers four diverse religions viz. that of the Jews, that of the Christians, that of the Grecians, and that of the Mahometans.

— Jean Bodin.

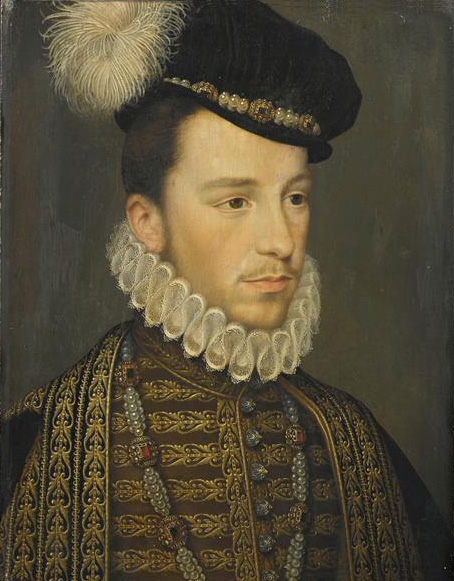
The French Prince Henri de Valois was elected king of Poland in 1572, partly due to the desire of Polish nobles to be agreeable to the Ottoman Empire.

The Ottoman Empire was at the height of its power, but for the forty years after these events, France would become embroiled in the bitter French Wars of Religion, and Ottoman power would start to slowly weaken after the 1571 Battle of Lepanto.

In 1572, after the death of the Polish king Sigismund Augustus, who had been under a Polish-Ottoman alliance of his own, Poland elected the French Henri de Valois, rather than Habsburg candidates, partly in order to be more agreeable to the Ottoman Empire. The choice of Henri de Valois had apparently been proposed by the Ottoman Grand Vizier Sokollu Mehmet Pasha. When Henri left to return to France in 1575, he was succeeded by Stephen Báthory of Poland, who also had been supported by the Ottomans in obtaining the Transylvanian throne in 1571.

In 1574, William of Orange and Charles IX of France, through his pro-Huguenot ambassador François de Noailles, Bishop of Dax, tried to obtain the support of the Ottoman Sultan Selim II in order to open a new front against the Spanish King Philip II. Selim II sent his support through a messenger, who endeavoured to put the Dutch in contact with the rebellious Moriscos of Spain and the pirates of Algiers. Selim also sent a great fleet in the Capture of Tunis in October 1574, thus succeeding in reducing Spanish pressure on the Dutch.

French Huguenots were in contact with the Moriscos in plans against Spain in the 1570s. Around 1575, plans were made for a combined attack of Aragonese Moriscos and Huguenots from Béarn under Henri de Navarre against Spanish Aragon, in agreement with the king of Algiers and the Ottoman Empire, but these projects foundered with the arrival of John of Austria in Aragon and the disarmament of the Moriscos. In 1576, a three-pronged fleet from Constantinople was planned to disembark between Murcia and Valencia while the French Huguenots would invade from the north and the Moriscos accomplish their uprising, but the Ottoman fleet failed to arrive.

Ottoman support for France would continue, as well as support for the Dutch and the English after 1580, and support for Protestants and Calvinists, as a way to counter Habsburg attempts at supremacy in Europe. For a time though, the Ottoman–Safavid War (1578–1590) turned the Ottomans' attention away from Europe.

=== Ottoman-Persian diplomatic rivalry in Europe ===
The conflict between the Ottomans and the Persians led the latter to try to forge a counter-acting Habsburg-Persian alliance with other European powers against the Ottoman Empire, particularly with the Habsburg Empire, some of the Italian states and Habsburg Spain. This plan was formalized by two major diplomatic endeavours: the Persian embassy to Europe (1599–1602), and the Persian embassy to Europe (1609–1615). The results however seem to have been limited.

== Continuation ==
For the three centuries following the beginning of the alliance, the Ottoman effectively continued to respect their commitment to protect Christian communities in their realm. The French kings succeeding to Francis I also generally maintained their pro-Ottoman policy. Numerous Ottoman embassies were received at the French court: from Suleiman I to Francis I in 1533, from Suleiman I to Charles IX in 1565 (embassy of Hajji Murad), from Selim II to Charles IX in 1571, from Murad III to Henry III in 1581.

=== Henry IV ===
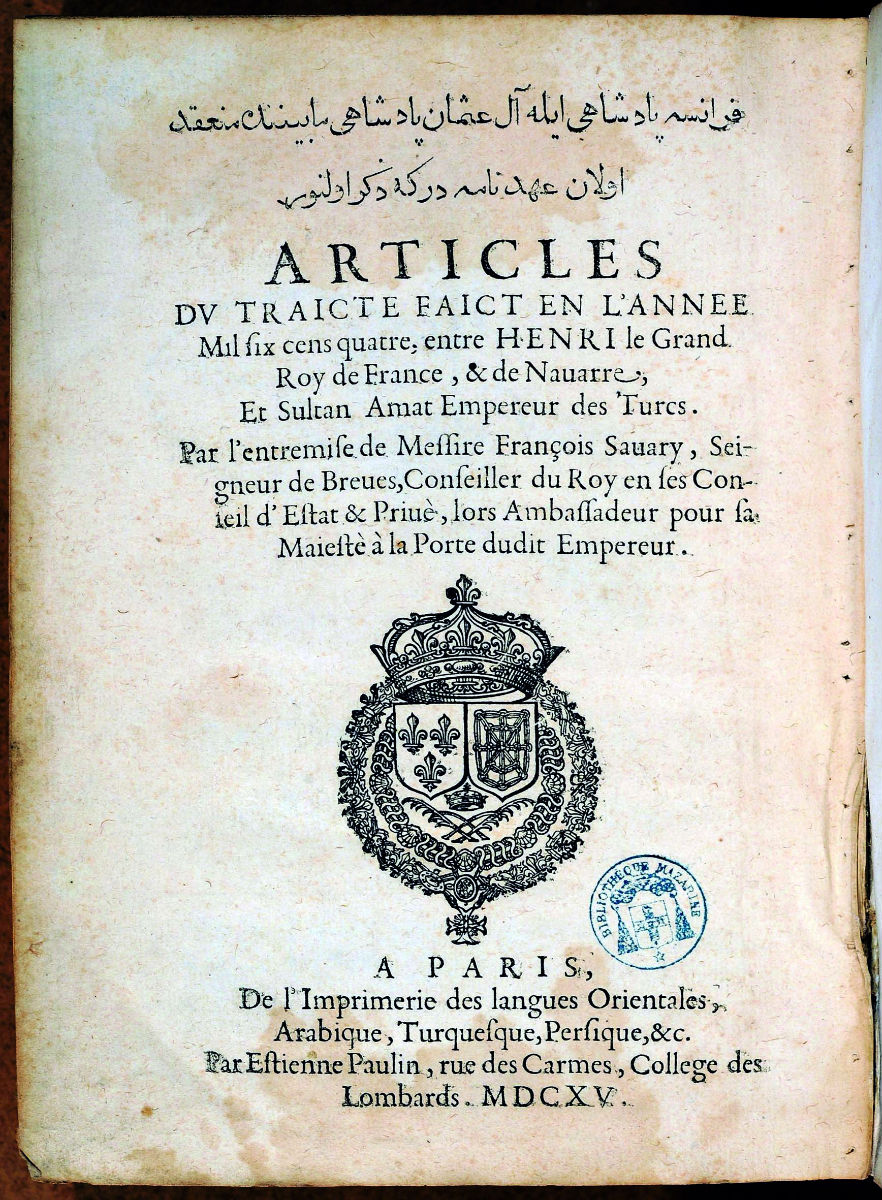
Bilingual Franco-Turkish translation of the 1604 Franco-Ottoman Capitulations between Sultan Ahmed I and King Henry IV, published by Savary de Brèves in 1615.

Even before Henry IV's accession to the throne, the French Huguenots were in contact with the Moriscos in plans against Habsburg Spain in the 1570s. Around 1575, plans were made for a combined attack of Aragonese Moriscos and Huguenots from Béarn under Henri de Navarre against Spanish Aragon, in agreement with the Bey of Algiers and the Ottoman Empire, but these projects foundered with the arrival of John of Austria in Aragon and the disarmament of the Moriscos. In 1576, a three-pronged fleet from Constantinople was planned to disembark between Murcia and Valencia while the French Huguenots would invade from the north and the Moriscos accomplish their uprising, but the Ottoman fleet failed to arrive.

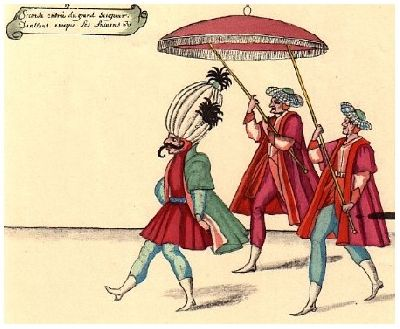
Illustration from Le Grand Bal de la Douairière de Billebahaut: "Entrance of the Great Turk", 1626.

Henry IV continued the policy of Franco-Ottoman alliance and received an embassy from Mehmed III in 1601. In 1604, a "Peace Treaty and Capitulation" was signed between Henry IV and the Ottoman Sultan Ahmed I, giving numerous advantages to France in the Ottoman Empire. An embassy was sent to Tunisia in 1608, led by François Savary de Brèves.

An embassy was again sent to Louis XIII in 1607, and from Mehmed IV to Louis XIV in 1669 in the person of ambassador Müteferrika Süleyman Ağa, who created a sensation at the French court and even triggered a Turkish fashion. The Orient came to have a strong influence in French literature, as about 50% of French travel guides in the 16th century were dedicated to the Ottoman Empire.

French influence remained paramount at Constantinople, and the Capitulations were renewed in 1604, forcing all nations to trade under the protection and flag of France, except for England and Venice which were competing, with the Dutch Republic, for influence in the Levant. In the context of competition for influence between Western powers, relations between France and the Ottoman Empire started to cool significantly. In 1643, the French lost the custody of the Holy Places to the Greeks.

=== Revival of the alliance under Louis XIV ===
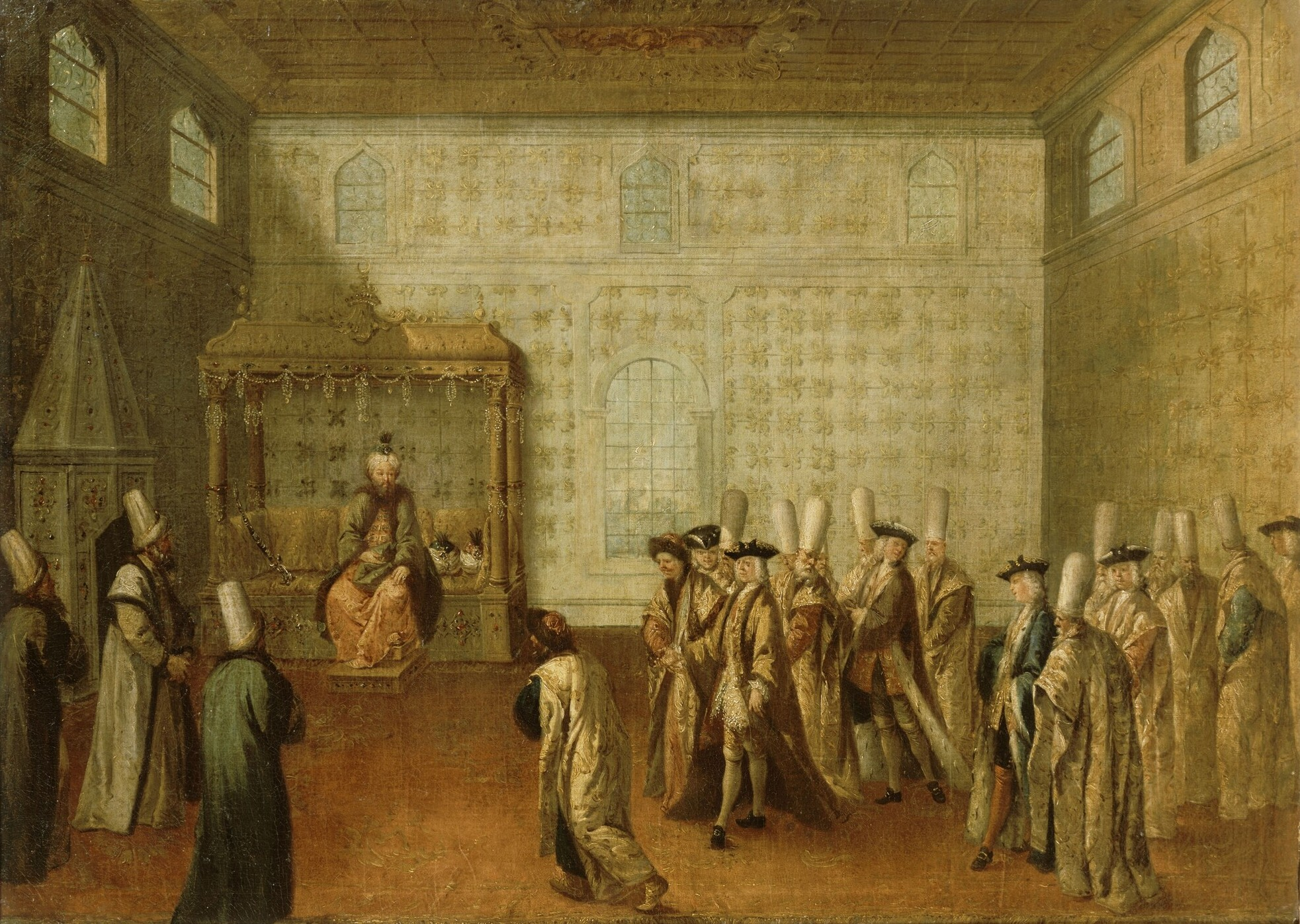
Ahmed III receiving the embassy of Charles de Ferriol in 1699; painting by Jean-Baptiste van Mour.

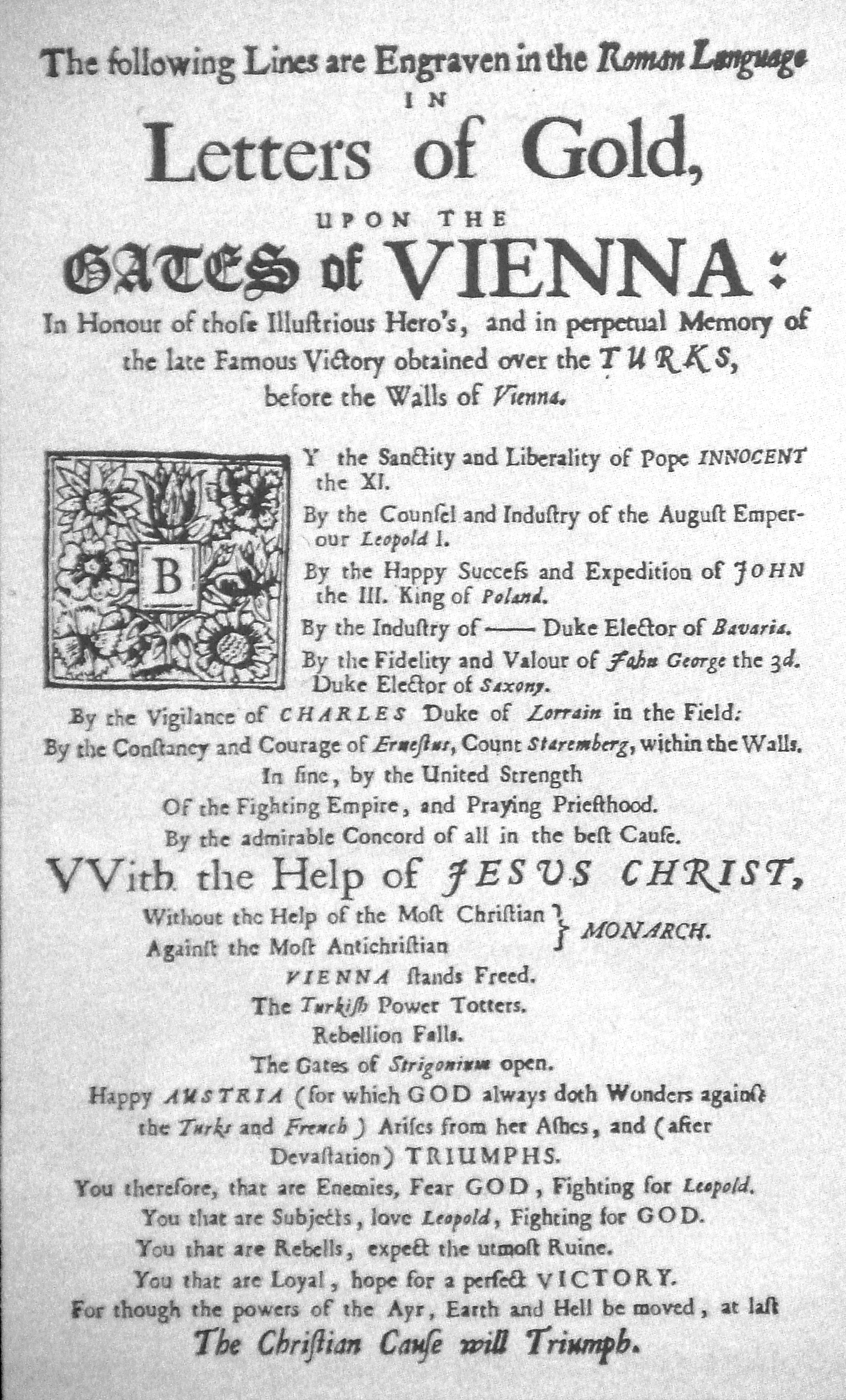
English pamphlet criticizing Louis XIV and Mehmed IV for their roles in the siege of Vienna in 1683 ("Without the help of the Most Christian/Against the Most Antichristian/Monarch").

Initially, the sentiment of Louis towards the Ottoman Empire seems to have been quite negative, and French troops assisted the Austrians against the Turks at the 1664 Battle of Saint-Gothard, and the Venetians against the Turks at the siege of Candia in 1669 under François de Beaufort. One of the reasons was that Louis XIV was in a shifting alliance with the Habsburgs, especially through his marriage with Marie-Thérèse of Spain in 1660. Louis's mother, Anne of Austria, was a Habsburg too.

The Barbary slave trade and Ottoman corsairs originating from Ottoman Algeria were a major problem throughout the centuries, leading to regular punitive expeditions by France (1661, 1665, 1682, 1683, 1688). French admiral Abraham Duquesne fought the Barbary corsairs in 1681 and bombarded Algiers between 1682 and 1683, to help Christian captives.

In 1673, Louis sent a fleet to the Dardanelles and obtained new capitulations recognizing him as sole protector of the Catholics. Soon Louis revived the alliance to facilitate his expansionist policies. Louis refrained from entering into a formal alliance with the Ottoman Empire, but maintained a cautious neutrality favourable to the Turks, encouraged them to open a new front against the Habsburgs, and effectively took advantage of their conflict with the Holy Roman Empire to further the territorial interests of France. In 1679 and 1680, Louis through his envoy Guilleragues encouraged the Ottoman Grand Vizier Kara Mustafa to intervene in the Magyar Rebellion against the Habsburg, but without success. Louis communicated to the Turks that he would never fight on the side of the Austrian Emperor Leopold I, and he instead massed troops at the eastern frontier of France. These reassurances encouraged the Turks not to renew the 20-year 1664 Vasvar truce with Austria and to move to the offensive. From 1683 and for a period of sixteen years, the Holy Roman Empire would be occupied in fighting the Ottoman Empire in the Great Turkish War. Louis refused to participate in the Holy League, a coalition of European powers against the Ottomans, adopting a position of neutrality, and encouraged Mehmed IV to persevere in his fight against the Habsburgs. Pamphleters and poets would criticize the position of Louis, and reinforce the unity of the League, by describing a battle between European "Liberty" on the one hand and "Eastern despotism" associated with "French absolutism" on the other.

The Ottoman Grand Vizier Kara Mustafa almost captured Vienna, but was finally repulsed at the Battle of Vienna in 1683. On that occasion, Louis not only declined to help the Austrians, but on the contrary tried to prevent John III Sobieski from saving the city of Vienna, and he used the opportunity to attack cities in Alsace and parts of southern Germany. He was able to sign the Truce of Ratisbon on 15 August 1684, giving him several territories which covered the frontier and protected France from foreign invasion.

In 1688, Louis again attacked the Habsburg Empire, in effect relieving pressure from the Ottomans. Louis was reviled for this action, and was called:

The most Christian Turk, the most Christian ravager of Christendom, the most Christian barbarian who had perpetrated on Christians outrages of which his infidel allies would have been ashamed.

— House of Commons Journal, April 15, 16 1689.

The Ottomans were able to stage a counter-attack and succeeded in the siege of Belgrade (1690), but they were finally defeated however in 1699 with the Treaty of Carlowitz.

==== Cultural exchanges ====
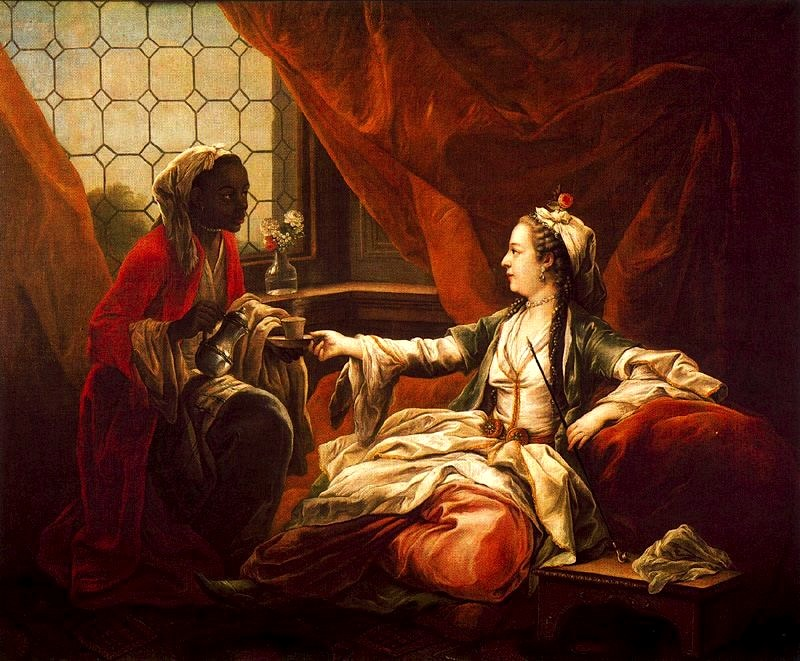
Madame de Pompadour portrayed as a Turkish lady in 1747 by Charles André van Loo, an example of Turquerie

By the end of the 17th century, the first major defeats of the Ottoman Empire reduced the perceived threat in European minds, which led to an artistic craze for Turkish things. There was a fashion for Turkish things with Turquerie, just as there was a fashion for Chinese things with Chinoiserie, both of which became constitutive components of the Rococo style. Orientalism started to become hugely popular, first with the works of Jean-Baptiste van Mour, who had accompanied the embassy of Charles de Ferriol to Constantinople 1699 and stayed there until the end of his life in 1737, and later with the works of Boucher or Fragonard.

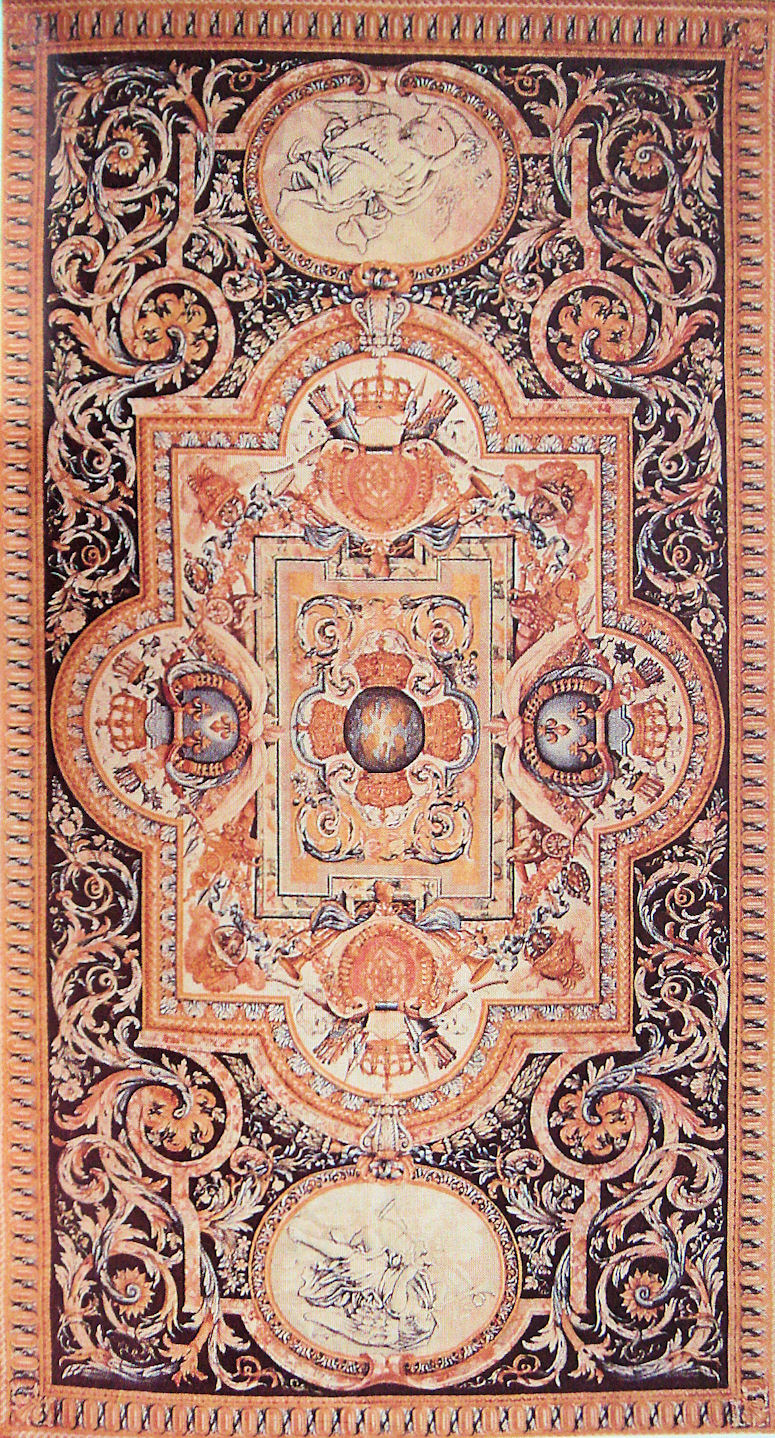
Tapis de Savonnerie, under Louis XIV, after Charles Le Brun, made for the Grande Galerie in the Louvre Palace.

French literature also was greatly influenced. In 1704 was published the first French version of One Thousand and One Nights. French authors used the East as a way to enrich their philosophical work and a pretext to write comments on the West: Montesquieu wrote the Lettres Persannes in 1721, a satirical essay on the West, Voltaire used the Oriental appeal to write Zaïre (1732) and Candide (1759). French travelers of the 17th century, such as Jean de Thévenot or Jean-Baptiste Tavernier routinely visited the Ottoman Empire.

There were also numerous culinary influences. Coffee was introduced to Marseille by Pierre de La Roque in 1664, but the fashion for coffee in Paris was triggered by the Ottoman ambassador to Louis XIV, Suleiman Aga, in 1669. Fashionable coffee-shops emerged such as the famous Café Procope, the first coffee-shop of Paris, in 1689. In the French high society wearing turbans and caftans became fashionable, as well as lying on rugs and cushions.

A carpet industry façon de Turquie ("in the manner of Turkey") was developed in France in the reign of Henry IV by Pierre Dupont, who was returning from the Levant, and especially rose to prominence during the reign of Louis XIV. The Tapis de Savonnerie especially exemplify this tradition ("the superb carpets of the Savonnerie, which long rivalled the carpets of Turkey, and latterly have far surpassed them") which was further adapted to local taste and developed with the Gobelins carpets. This tradition also spread to England where it revived the English carpet industry in the 18th century.

=== Continued support from Louis XV to the Revolution ===
==== Ottoman embassies ====
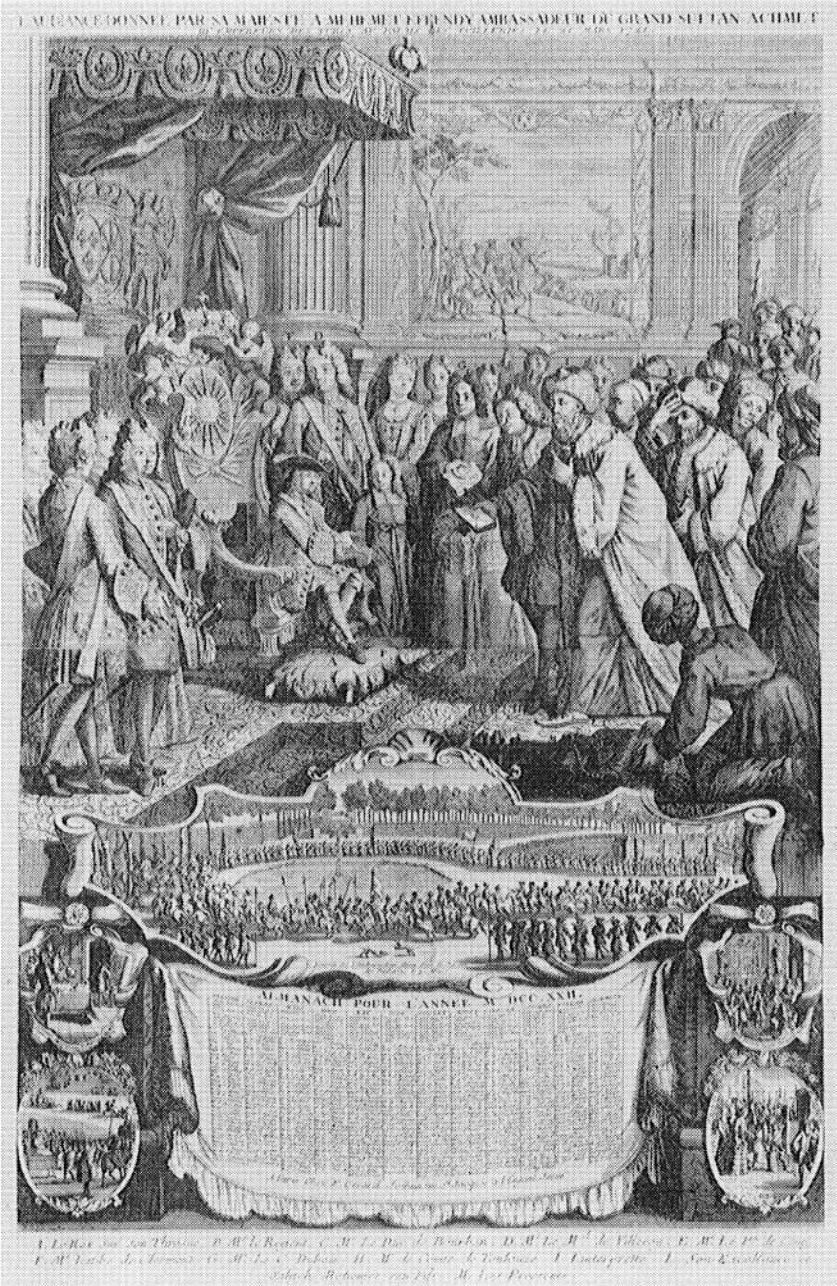
Louis XV as a child receiving Ottoman ambassador Mehmed Efendi in 1721.

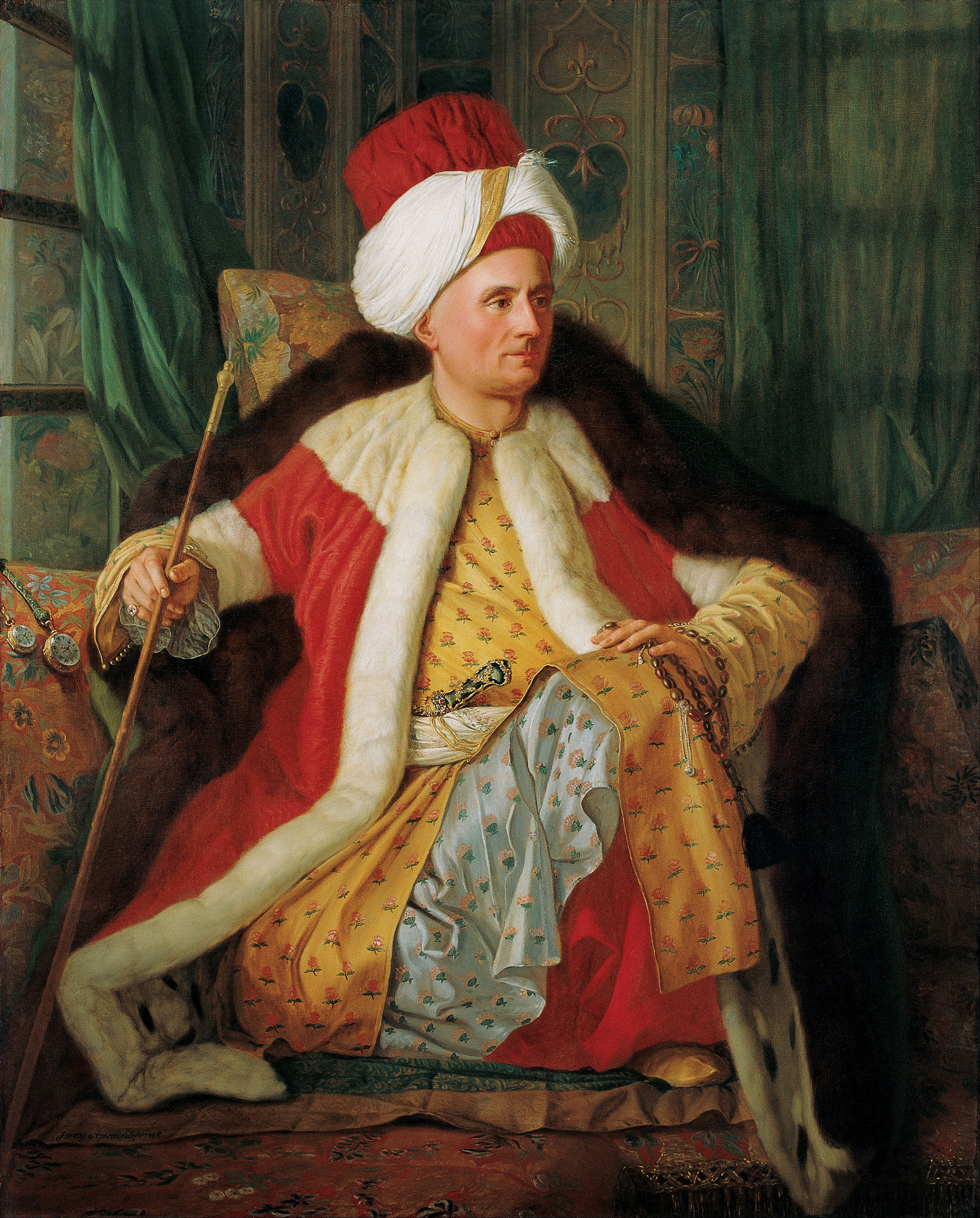
French ambassador Charles Gravier de Vergennes in Ottoman dress, painted by Antoine de Favray, 1766, Pera Museum, Istanbul.

In the early 18th century, the Ottoman Sultan Ahmed III (1703–1730) endeavoured to send an embassy to France in order to formally establish France as a strategic ally against the common Russian and Austrian enemy. In 1720, Mehmed Efendi was assigned as Ottoman ambassador to Louis XV and sent to Paris. His embassy of eleven months was notable for being the first ever foreign representation of a permanent nature for the Ottoman Empire. During 1721–22, he visited France on an extensive fact-finding mission, with the objective of gathering information for the modernization of the Ottoman Empire. On his return to the Ottoman capital, Mehmed Çelebi presented his contacts, experiences and observations to the Sultan in the form of a book, a Sefâretnâme. Another embassy, led by Mehmed Said Efendi would visit France in 1742.

==== Diplomatic and technical collaboration ====
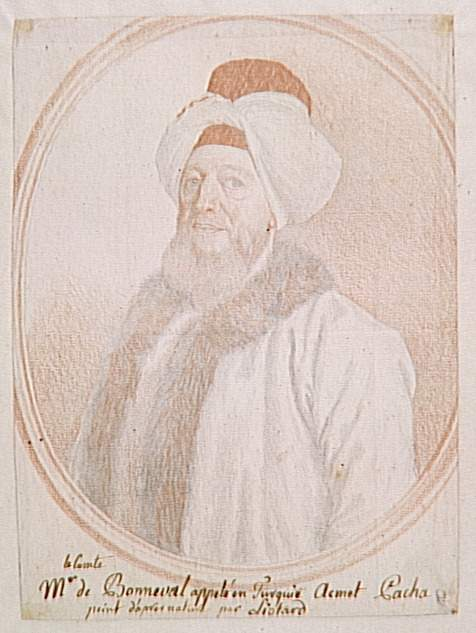
The French officer Claude Alexandre de Bonneval helped modernize the Ottoman Army.

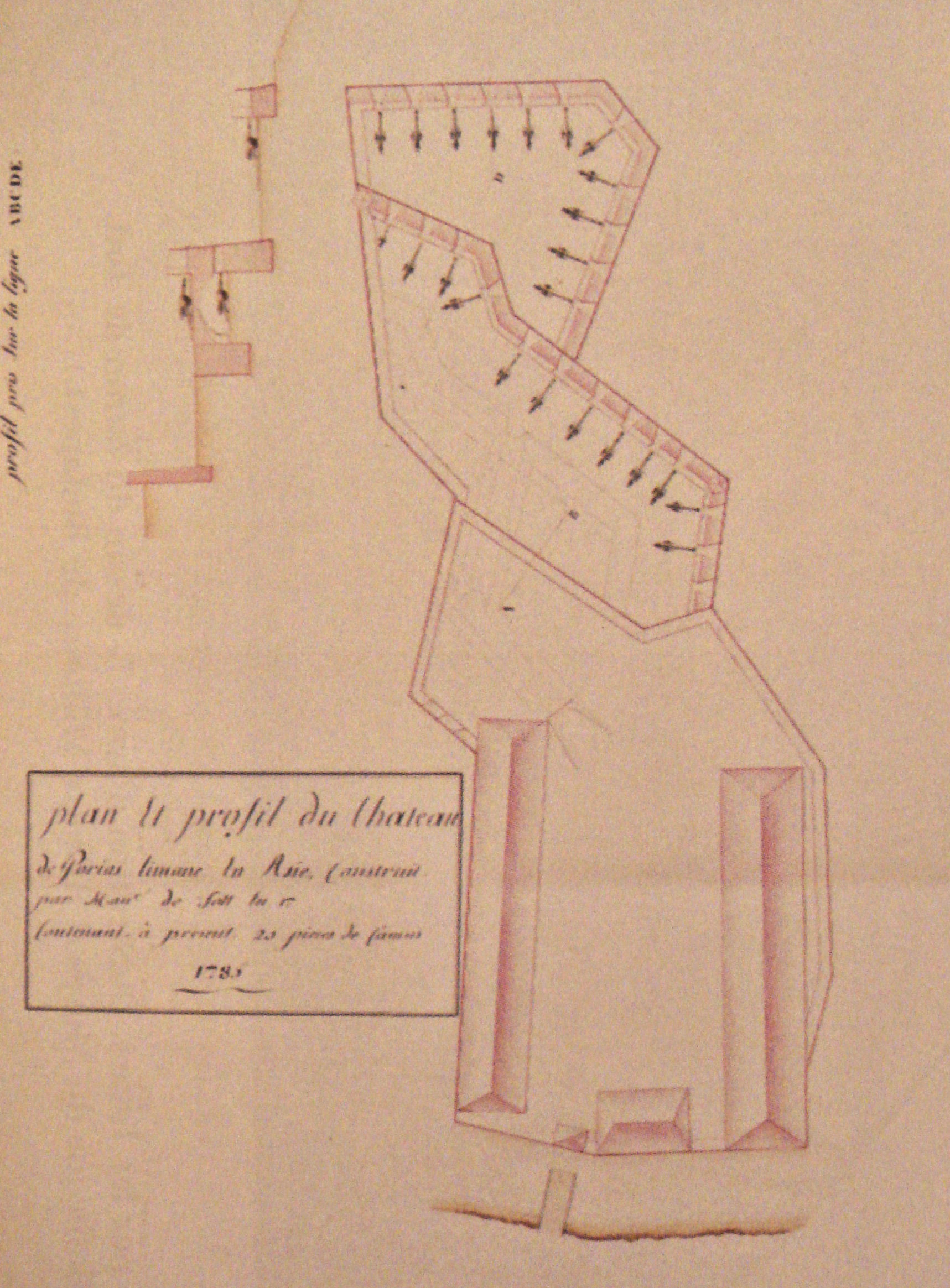
A fortification built by the Baron de Tott for the Ottoman Empire during the Russo-Turkish War (1768–1774).

Throughout the period, contacts were varied and multiple. France was willing to help in order to maintain strategic balance in Europe. Through its intervention and that of Ambassador Louis de Villenneuve in negotiating the 1739 Treaty of Belgrade, France effectively supported the Ottoman Empire into maintaining a strong presence in Europe against Austria for several more decades, and "re-emerged in its traditional role as the Ottomans' best friend in Christendom".

Also, as the Ottoman Empire was losing ground militarily during the 18th century, it made numerous efforts to recruit French experts for its modernization. The French officer and adventurer Claude-Alexandre de Bonneval (1675–1747) went in the service of Sultan Mahmud I, converted to Islam, and endeavoured to modernize the Ottoman Army, creating cannon foundries, powder and musket factories and a military engineering school. Another officer François Baron de Tott was involved in the reform efforts for the Ottoman military. He succeeded in having a new foundry built to make howitzers, and was instrumental in the creation of mobile artillery units. He built fortifications on the Bosphorus and started a naval science course that laid the foundation stone for the later Turkish Naval Academy.

===== Louis XVI =====
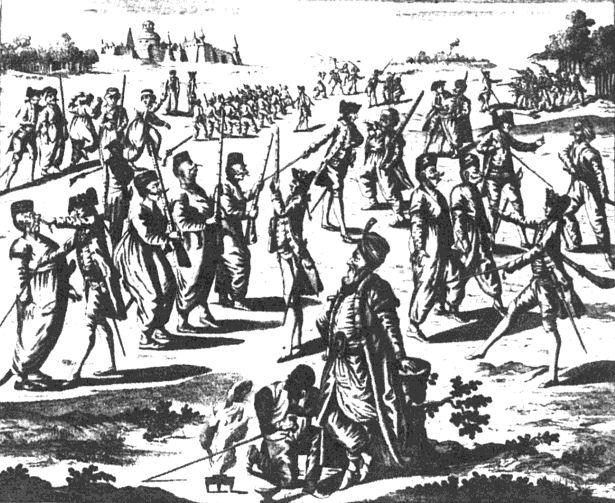
Contemporary caricature of the 1783 French Military Mission in Constantinople training Ottoman troops.

Under Louis XVI from 1783, a French Military Mission was sent to the Ottoman Empire to train the Turks in naval warfare and fortification building. Up to the French Revolution in 1789, about 300 French artillery officers and engineers were active in the Ottoman Empire to modernize and train artillery units. From 1784, Antoine-Charles Aubert reached Constantinople with 12 experts. The same year, French engineering officers André-Joseph Lafitte-Clavé and Joseph-Monnier de Courtois arrived to instruct engineering drawings and techniques in the new Turkish engineering school Mühendishâne-i Hümâyûn established by the Grand Vizier Halil Hamid Pasha. Mostly French textbooks were used on mathematics, astronomy, engineering, weapons, war techniques and navigation. However, all instructors had to leave with the end of the Franco-Ottoman alliance in 1798.

===== Revolutionary France =====
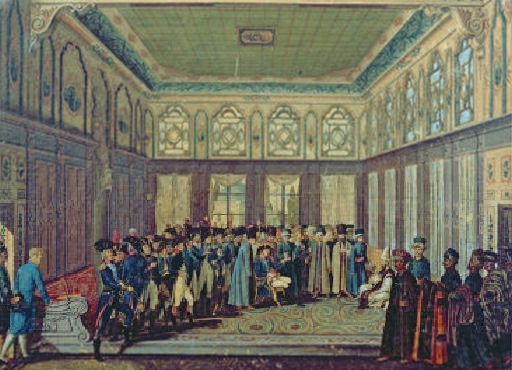
General Aubert-Dubayet with his Military Mission being received by the Grand Vizier in 1796, painting by Antoine-Laurent Castellan.

This policy initially continued during the French Revolution, as France was clearly in need of an eastern diversion against its continental enemies. For the Ottoman Empire, the French Revolution was a godsend, since conflict between European powers could only weaken the states that were its traditional enemies. For Sultan Selim III, this was a golden opportunity to modernize, and achieve the "New Order" (Nizam-i Jedid). He established permanent embassies in several European countries, and turned to France for help. Various experts were sent, and in 1795, French envoy extraordinaire Raymond de Verninac-Saint-Maur attempted to establish a Treaty of Alliance. A young artillery officer by the name of Napoleon Bonaparte was also to be sent to Constantinople in 1795 to help organize Ottoman artillery. He did not go, for just days before he was to embark for the Near East he proved himself useful to the Directory by putting down a Parisian mob in the whiff of grapeshot and was kept in France.

In 1796, General Aubert-Dubayet was sent to the Ottoman court with artillery equipment, and French artillerymen and engineers to help with the development of the Ottoman arsenals and foundries. Infantry and cavalry officers were also to train the Spahis and Janissaries, but they were frustrated by the opposition of the Janissaries. This relationship would sour with the ascent of Napoleon I.

== Epilogue: Napoleon I ==
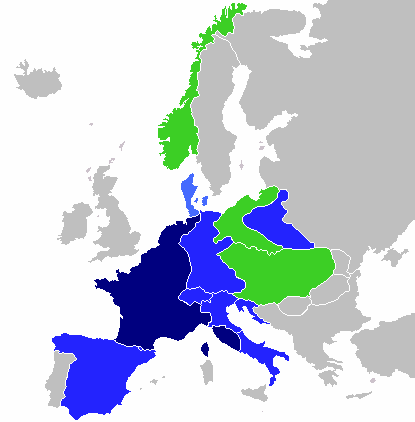
Through his conquests (here, Napoleon's empire at its greatest extent in 1811) Napoleon came in direct contact with the Ottoman Empire. French Empire Conquered "Rebellious" States Conquered "Allied" States

With the advent of Napoleon I, France adopted a strongly expansionist policy which put it in direct contact with the Ottoman Empire. Following the Treaty of Campo Formio in 1797, France acquired possessions in the Mediterranean such as the Ionian islands as well as former Venetian bases on the coast of Albania and Greece. Relations with the Ottoman Empire became all of a sudden strained. Napoleon Bonaparte invaded Egypt in 1798 and fought against the Ottomans to establish a French presence in the Middle East, with the ultimate dream of linking with Tippoo Sahib in India. Although the long period of Franco-Ottoman friendship was now over, Napoleon I still claimed great respect for Islam, and appealed to the long history of friendly relations between the Ottoman Empire and France:

Peoples of Egypt, you will be told that I have come to destroy your religion: do not believe it! Answer that I have come to restore your rights and punish the usurpers, and that, more than the Mamluks, I respect God, his Prophet and the Quran... Is it not we who have been through the centuries the friends of the Sultan?

— Napoleon to the Egyptians.

Napoleon had toppled the Mamluk beys, the effective rulers of Egypt under nominal Ottoman suzerainty, but still raised the French flag side by side with the Ottoman banner throughout the Egyptian territory, claiming his love for Islam, and saying that they were saving the Ottomans from the Mamluks. Selim III however immediately declared a Jihad and sought the help of Britain and Russia, who both felt both threatened by Napoleon's conquests. On January 3, 1799, the Ottoman Empire allied with Russia, and two days later with Great Britain.

Britain took the opportunity to ally with the Ottoman Empire in order to repel Napoleon's invasion, intervening militarily during the siege of Acre with Admiral William Sidney Smith in 1799, and under Ralph Abercromby at the Battle of Abukir in 1801. By 1802, the French were completely vanquished in the Middle East.

=== A final, but short-lived, alliance ===
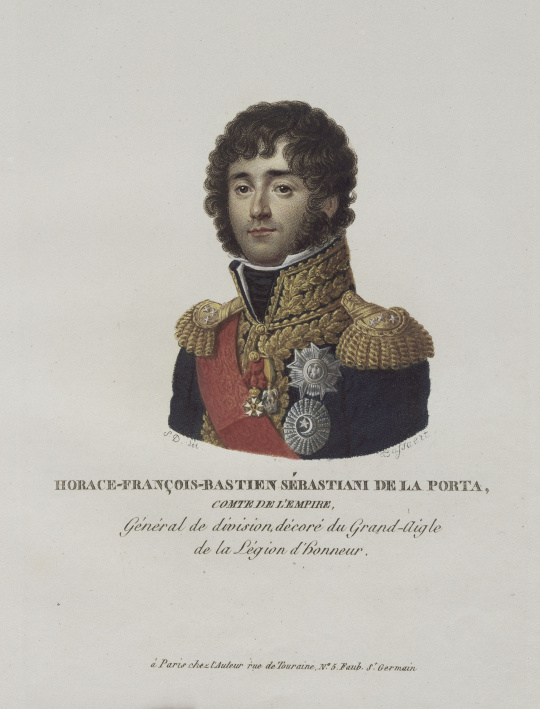
The French General Horace Sebastiani negotiated the alliance with Selim III.

Soon however, in 1803, France and Great Britain were again at war, and Napoleon went to great lengths to try to convince the Ottoman Empire to fight against Russia in the Balkans and join his anti-Russian coalition. On its side, Russia vied for Ottoman favour, and succeeded in signing a Treaty of Defensive Alliance in 1805.

Napoleon continued his efforts to win the Ottoman Empire to his cause. He sent General Horace Sebastiani as envoy extraordinary. Napoleon promised to help the Ottoman Empire recover lost territories. He wrote to the Sultan:

Are you blind to your own interests – have you ceased to reign? (...) If Russia has an army of 15,000 men at Corfu, do you think that it is directed against me? Armed vessels have the habit of hastening to Constantinople. Your dynasty is about to descend into oblivion... Trust only your true friend, France

— Letter from Napoleon to Selim III.

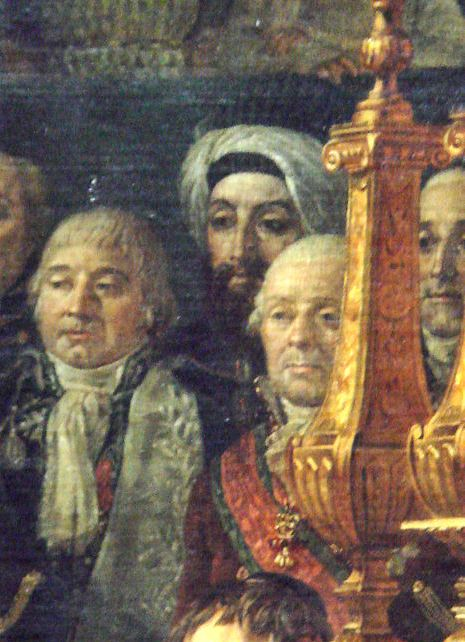
Ottoman ambassador Halet Efendi in The Coronation of Napoleon in 1804, by Jacques-Louis David (detail).

In February 1806, following Napoleon's remarkable victory in the Battle of Austerlitz in December 1805 and the ensuing dismemberment of the Holy Roman Empire, Selim III finally refused to ratify the Russian and British alliances, and recognized Napoleon as Emperor, formally opting for an alliance with France "our sincere and natural ally", and war with Russia and Britain. He also sent Muhib Efendi to Paris as ambassador (1806–1811). Selim III's decisions in favour of France triggered the 1806 Russo-Turkish War and the 1807 Anglo-Turkish War. Selim III repelled the British fleet of John Thomas Duckworth with the help of Sebastiani, but lost several major encounters against Russia, and he was finally toppled by his Janissaries as he was trying to reform his army, and replaced by Sultan Mustafa IV. Mustafa IV however, persisted with the Franco-Ottoman alliance, and sent ambassador Halet Efendi to Paris to work out the details. Concurrently, Napoleon also formed a Franco-Persian alliance in 1807, through the signature of the Treaty of Finkenstein.

In a final reversal however, Napoleon I finally vanquished Russia at the Battle of Friedland in July 1807. The alliance between France and the Ottoman Empire was maintained, and a peace settlement was brokered between Russia and the Ottomans, but the territories the Ottomans had been promised (Moldavia and Wallachia) through the Treaty of Tilsit were never returned, although the Ottomans themselves had complied with their part of the agreement by moving their troops south of the Danube. Faced with betrayal by Russia, and the failure of France to have the agreement enforced, the Ottoman Empire, now ruled by Sultan Mahmud II, finally signed on 5 January 1809 a Treaty of Peace, Commerce and Secret Alliance with Great Britain, which was now at war with both France and Russia. In 1812, through the Treaty of Bucharest, the Ottoman Empire and Russia agreed to make peace, just as Russia was anxious to liberate this southern front in anticipation of Napoleon's Invasion of Russia, with Russia keeping Bessarabia and the Ottomans regaining Wallachia and Moldavia. In the post-Napoleonic world, at the 1815 Congress of Vienna, the Ottoman Empire was still recognized as an essential part of the European status quo.

== Crimean War and Syria ==
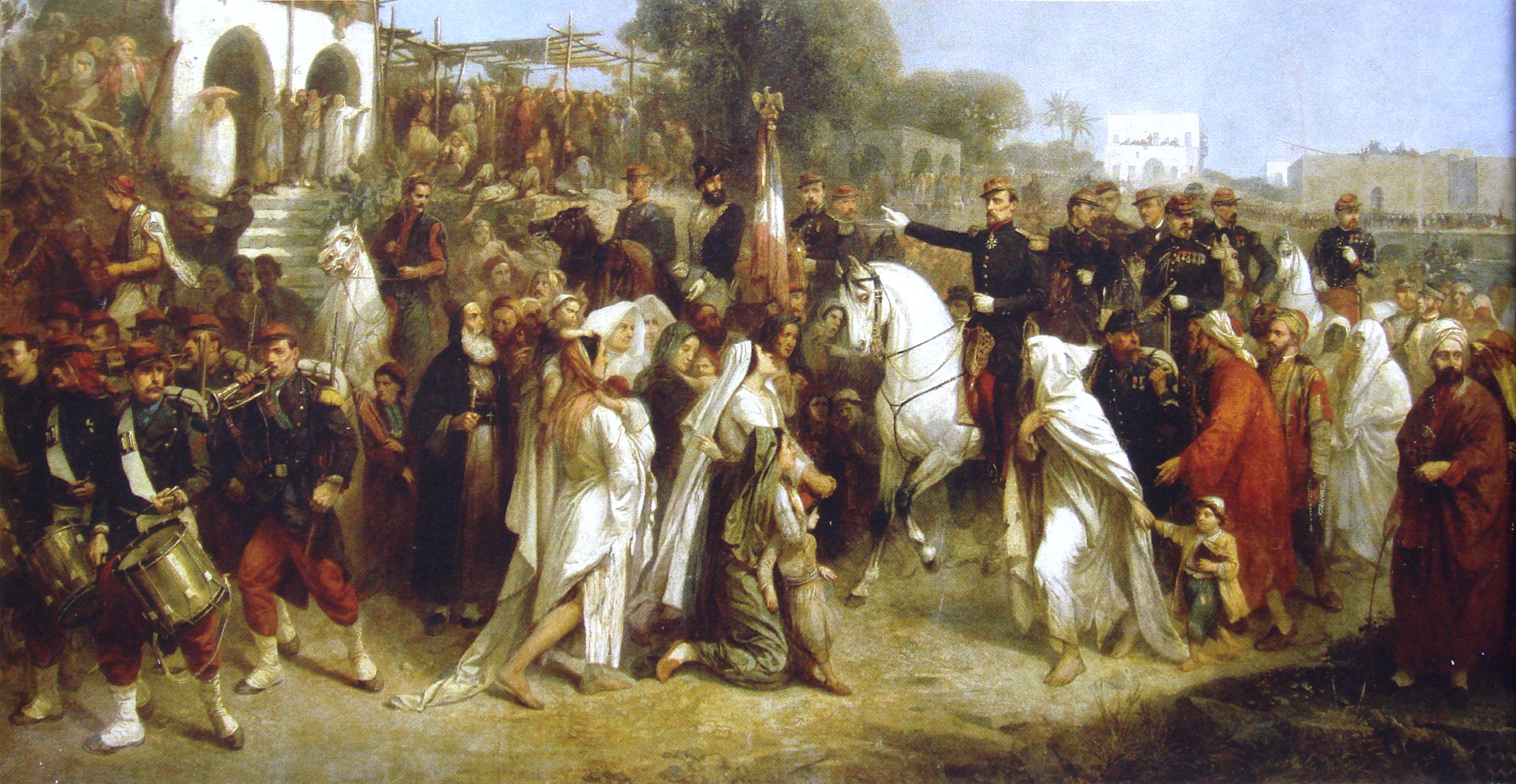
French expedition in Syria led by General Beaufort d'Hautpoul, landing in Beyrouth on 16 August 1860.

In the Crimean War, a French-British-Ottoman alliance against Russia was signed on 12 March 1854.

In another example of cooperation, in 1860, France later intervened in the Ottoman territory of Syria, with the agreement of the Ottoman Empire, with the objective to fulfill its mission to protect Christians in the Middle East, following massacres of Maronite Christians. At that time, France, led by Emperor Napoleon III, claimed to continue its ancient role as protector of Christians in the Ottoman Empire.

== Impact on European religious politics ==
The alliance had profound repercussions within European Christendom. France's collaboration with Muslim "infidels" became a major propaganda tool for Protestants against both the Catholic Habsburgs and France itself. It fueled intense debates across Europe concerning the primacy of "reason of state" over religious unity and significantly undermined the Papacy's efforts to maintain Catholic solidarity against both the Ottoman threat and the Protestant Reformation.

== See also ==
- French–Habsburg rivalry
- Habsburg–Persian alliance
- International relations, 1648–1814
- Turco-Calvinism
- France-Turkey Relations
- Orientalism in early modern France
- Turquerie
- Palais de France, Istanbul

== Sources ==
- Frazee, Charles A. (2006) [1983]. Catholics and Sultans: The Church and the Ottoman Empire 1453–1923. Cambridge: Cambridge University Press. ISBN 9780521027007.
- Robert A. Kann A History of the Habsburg Empire, 1526–1918 University of California Press, 1980 ISBN 0-520-04206-9
- William Miller The Ottoman Empire and Its Successors, 1801–1927 Routledge, (1927; reprinted 1966) ISBN 0-7146-1974-4 (1st ed. 1913, 2nd ed. 1922)
- Roger Bigelow Merriman Suleiman the Magnificent 1520–1566 READ BOOKS, 2007 ISBN 1-4067-7272-0
- Setton, Kenneth M. (1984). The Papacy and the Levant (1204–1571), Volume III: The Sixteenth Century to the Reign of Julius III. Vol. 3. Philadelphia: The American Philosophical Society. ISBN 0-87169-161-2.
- Fatma Müge Göçek East Encounters West: France and the Ottoman Empire in the Eighteenth Century Oxford University Press US, 1987 ISBN 0-19-504826-1
- Jack Goody Islam in Europe Wiley-Blackwell, 2004 ISBN 0-7456-3193-2
- McCabe, Ina Baghdiantz 2008 Orientalism in early Modern France Berg ISBN 978-1-84520-374-0
- Peter Malcolm Holt, Ann K. S. Lambton, Bernard Lewis The Cambridge History of Islam Cambridge University Press, 1977 ISBN 0-521-29135-6
- Inari Karsh Empires of the Sand: The Struggle for Mastery in the Middle East, 1789–1923 Harvard University Press, 2001 ISBN 0-674-00541-4
- Harold Lamb Suleiman the Magnificent – Sultan of the East READ BOOKS, 2008 ISBN 1-4437-3144-7
- Daniel Goffman The Ottoman Empire and early modern Europe Cambridge University Press, 2002 ISBN 0-521-45908-7
- Roger Crowley, Empire of the sea, 2008 Faber & Faber ISBN 978-0-571-23231-4
- Garnier, Edith L'Alliance Impie Editions du Felin, 2008, Paris ISBN 978-2-86645-678-8 Interview
- Piccirillo, Anthony Carmen (2009). ""A Vile, Infamous, Diabolical Treaty" The Franco-Ottoman Alliance of Francis I and the Eclipse of the Christendom Ideal" (PDF). Georgetown University. Archived from the original (PDF) on 2011-10-03. – Senior Honors Thesis in History
- Yann Bouvier, « Récits de voyage et représentation de l'espace. La Méditerranée de Jérôme Maurand, un espace vécu », Mémoire de Master, Dir. par Pierre-Yves Beaurepaire, Université de Nice, 2007, 292 p.
- Yann Bouvier, « Antoine Escalin des Aimars (1498?–1578) – De la Garde-Adhémar au siège de Nice, le parcours d'un Ambassadeur de François Ier », Recherches Régionales, Nice, Conseil Général des Alpes-Maritimes, n°188, Octobre-décembre 2007, 28 pp.
- Mathieu Grenet, « Muslim missions to early modern France, c.1610-c.1780 : notes for a social history of cross-cultural diplomacy », Journal of Early Modern History, Vol. 19, No. 2-3 (2015): 223–244.
