= 1535 =

1535 in various calendars
- Gregorian calendar: 1535; MDXXXV
- Ab urbe condita: 2288
- Armenian calendar: 984; ԹՎ ՋՁԴ
- Assyrian calendar: 6285
- Balinese saka calendar: 1456–1457
- Bengali calendar: 941–942
- Berber calendar: 2485
- English Regnal year: 26 Hen. 8 – 27 Hen. 8
- Buddhist calendar: 2079
- Burmese calendar: 897
- Byzantine calendar: 7043–7044
- Chinese calendar: 甲午年 (Wood Horse); 4232 or 4025 — to — 乙未年 (Wood Goat); 4233 or 4026
- Coptic calendar: 1251–1252
- Discordian calendar: 2701
- Ethiopian calendar: 1527–1528
- Hebrew calendar: 5295–5296
- Hindu calendars
- Vikram Samvat: 1591–1592
- Shaka Samvat: 1456–1457
- Kali Yuga: 4635–4636
- Holocene calendar: 11535
- Igbo calendar: 535–536
- Iranian calendar: 913–914
- Islamic calendar: 941–942
- Japanese calendar: Tenbun 4 (天文４年)
- Javanese calendar: 1453–1454
- Julian calendar: 1535; MDXXXV
- Korean calendar: 3868
- Minguo calendar: 377 before ROC 民前377年
- Nanakshahi calendar: 67
- Thai solar calendar: 2077–2078
- Tibetan calendar: ཤིང་ཕོ་རྟ་ལོ་ (male Wood-Horse); 1661 or 1280 or 508 — to — ཤིང་མོ་ལུག་ལོ་ (female Wood-Sheep); 1662 or 1281 or 509

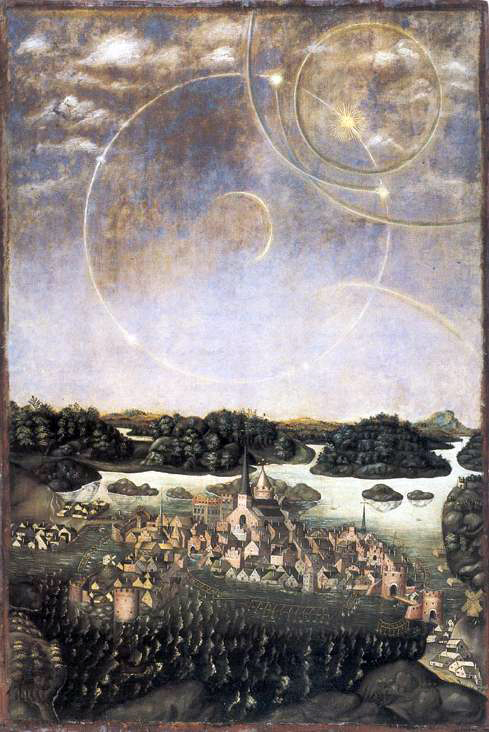
April 20: The Vädersol appears in the sky over Stockholm and is interpreted as an omen from God

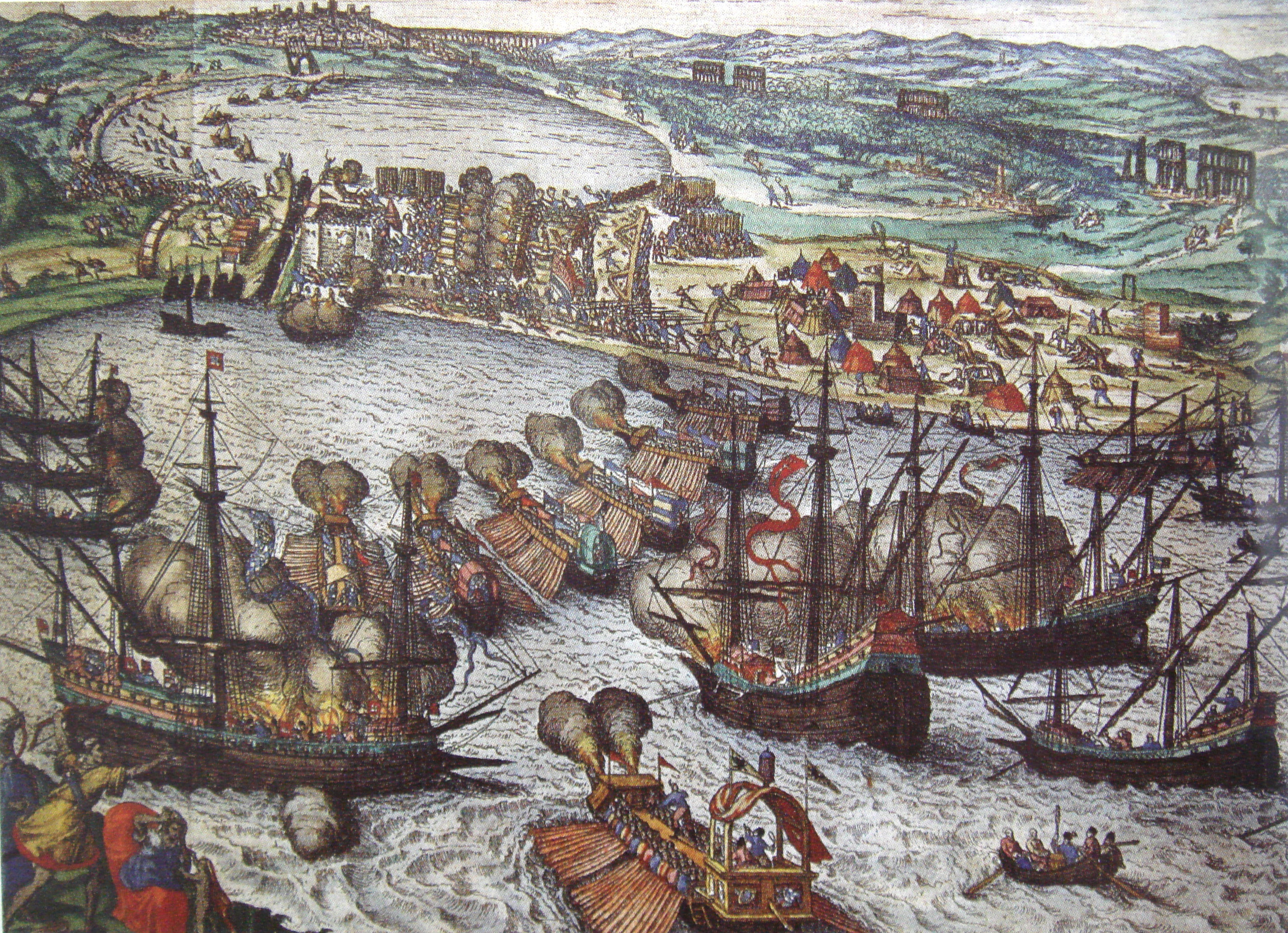
June 1: The Holy Roman Empire begins its attempt at the Conquest of Tunis.

Year 1535 (MDXXXV) was a common year starting on Friday of the Julian calendar.

== Events ==
=== January–March ===
- January 18 – Lima, now the capital of Peru, is founded by Francisco Pizarro, as Ciudad de los Reyes.
- January 21 – The French Protestant leaders of the October 1534 Affaire des Placards are burned to death in front of the Cathedral of Notre-Dame de Paris and witnessed by a large crowd that includes King François and the visiting Ottoman diplomats.
- February 27 – George Joye publishes his Apologye in Antwerp, to clear his name from the accusations of William Tyndale.
- March 10 – Fray Tomás de Berlanga discovers the Galápagos Islands, when blown off course en route to Peru.
- March 23 – English forces under William Skeffington storm Maynooth Castle in Ireland, the stronghold of Thomas FitzGerald, 10th Earl of Kildare, after a siege that began on March 16. Skeffington shows little mercy to the 25 surviving defenders, and has them decapitated in front of the castle two days after the surrender.
- March 29 – (Tenbun 4, 26th day of 2nd month) Go-Nara, who has ruled since 1526 is formally installed as the 105th Emperor of Japan

=== April–June ===
- April 11 – The visiting Ottoman envoys to France depart from Marseille, six months after having arrived from Istanbul in October. Jean de La Forêt, the new French ambassador to the Ottoman Empire, accompanies the Ottoman fleet with his party on a French galley, and the group sails to Tunis.
- April 20 – While King Gustav Vasa of Sweden is out of the country, an unusual atmospheric phenomenon, the Vädersol, appears in the sky over the Swedish capital of Stockholm, and last for two hours. Because of uncertainty about whether the vädersol is a sign of God showing favor or disapproval of the Protestant reformation and of King Gustav himself, the Evangelical Lutheran Archbishop Olaus Petri commissions Urban Larsson to document the event in a painting, the Vädersolstavlan.
- May 4 – The first of the English Carthusian Martyrs of London, John Houghton of London, Robert Lawrence of Beauvale, and Augustine Webster of Axholme are executed at Tyburn after refusing to sign the English Oath of Supremacy. The three will be canonized 435 years later on October 25, 1970, as saints of the Roman Catholic Church, with a feast day of May 4.
- May 10 – In Amsterdam, a small troop of Anabaptists, led by the minister Jacob van Geel, attacks the city hall, in an attempted coup to seize the city. In the counter-attack by the city's militia, the burgemeester, Pieter Colijns, is killed by the rebels. In another incident this year in Amsterdam, seven men and five women walk nude in the streets; and Anabaptists rebel in other cities of the Netherlands.
- May 19 – French explorer Jacques Cartier sets sail for his second voyage to North America with three ships, 110 men, and Chief Donnacona's two sons (taken by Cartier during his first voyage).
- May 20 – William Tyndale is arrested in Antwerp for heresy, in relation to his Bible translation, and imprisoned in Vilvoorde.
- June 1 – The Conquest of Tunis by Charles V, Holy Roman Emperor, begins with the destruction of Barbarossa's fleet. Following the eventual capture of the city from the Ottoman Empire, around 30,000 inhabitants are massacred.
- June 8 – Battle of Bornholm: Combined Swedish and Danish fleets defeat the Hanseatic navy.
- June 22 – Cardinal John Fisher, Bishop of Rochester, is executed for his refusal to swear an oath of loyalty to King Henry VIII of England.
- June 24 – Münster Rebellion: The Anabaptist state of Münster is conquered and disbanded.

=== July–September ===
- July 3 – Diego de Almagro leaves the recently conquered Inca capital of Cuzco to lead an expedition to Chile.
- July 6 – Sir Thomas More, author of Utopia and one time Lord Chancellor of England, is executed for treason, after refusing to recognize King Henry VIII as head of the English Church, and separate from the Roman Catholic Church.
- July 15 – Archdeacon Charles Reynolds (cleric), envoy to James V, Charles V, and Pope Paul III, is buried in Rome. He died of malaria while lobbying for the excommunication of King Henry VIII for heresy.
- August 17 – Pope Paul III issues a papal bull, Sublimis Deus, to appoint a commission of five cardinals and three bishops to carry out a reform of the city of Rome and the Roman Curia, with unlimited powers to uproot and punish all spiritual and secular transgressions, abuses, and errors.
- September 13 – Charles V, Holy Roman Emperor, becomes the first person to pass through the new Porta Nuova in Palermo, celebrating the European conquest of the North African territory of Tunis.

=== October–December ===
- October 2 – Jacques Cartier reaches the island in the Saint Lawrence River, that eventually becomes Montreal.
- October 4 – The first complete English-language Bible is printed in Antwerp, with translations by William Tyndale and Myles Coverdale.

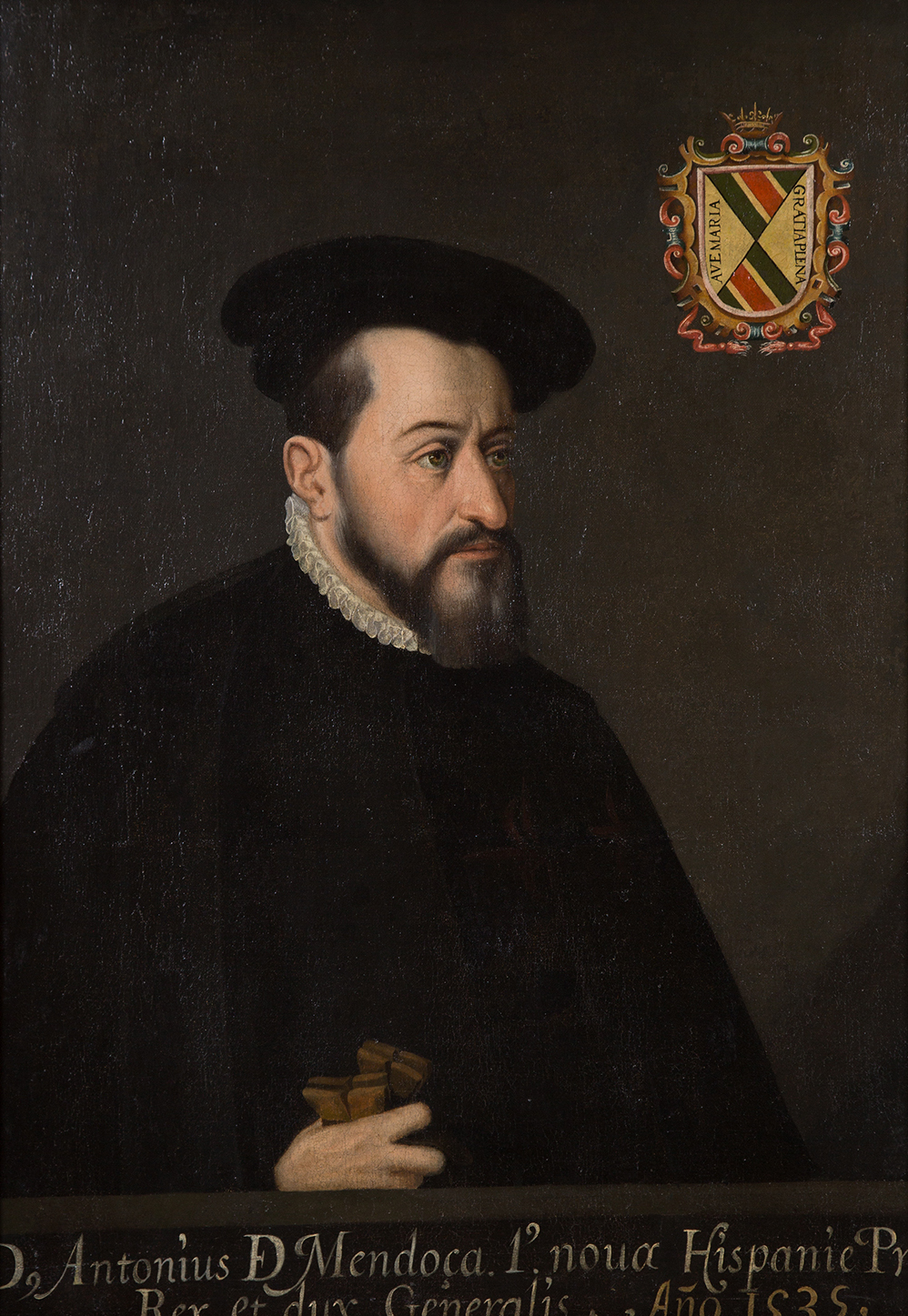
Viceroy Mendoza of New Spain

- November 1 – Eighteen days after the death of Francesco II Sforza, Charles V, Holy Roman Emperor and King of Spain Charles V claims the Duchy of Milan as his inheritance under Sforza's will. King François of France disputes the claim of Charles, citing the French right to rule Milan, Genoa and Asti, and the dispute leads to war between France and the Empire.
- November 14 –
  - Spanish colonial administrator Antonio de Mendoza is appointed as the first Viceroy of New Spain, with jurisdiction on behalf of King Carlos of Spain over a large area of what is now Mexico and the southwestern United States, from California to Louisiana, the state of Florida, most of Central America and the Caribbean, the northern parts of South America, the Philippines and Guam.
  - Voters in the Republic of Geneva approve the merger of the city's seven charitable establishments into a single entity, the Hôpital général
- November 30 – Jakob Hutter, leader of the Hutterites is arrested along with his wife in Klausen in the Tyrol region on the Italian side of the Alps. The two are taken to the prison at the fortress in Bronzolo.
- December 4 – The Consejo de i Diexe, governing body for the Republic of Venice, votes to replace the republic's treasury, made of wood, with the Zecca a structure that has stone vaults, and invites architects to submit designs.
- December 28 – James Atkenhead, the envoy of Scotland's King James V, leaves Scotland to travel to France to evaluate Mary of Bourbon, daughter of Charles, Duke of Vendôme, as a prospective queen consort. After the evaluation, and a personal visit by King James to France, the Scottish monarch decides to return to his plan to marry Madeline of Valois, daughter of King Francois of France.
- December – Manco Inca Yupanqui, nominally Sapa Inca, is imprisoned by the Spanish Conquistadors of Peru.

=== Date unknown ===
- Mughal Emperor Humayun gives battle to Bahadur Shah of Gujarat.
- Spanish forces abandon the second attempted conquest of Yucatán.
- The earliest (partially) preserved printed book in Estonian, a Catechism with a translation by Johann Koell from the Middle Low German Lutheran text of Simon Wanradt, is printed by Hans Lufft in Wittenberg, for use in Tallinn.
- Suleiman the Magnificent begins the rebuilding of the walls around Jerusalem.

== Births ==
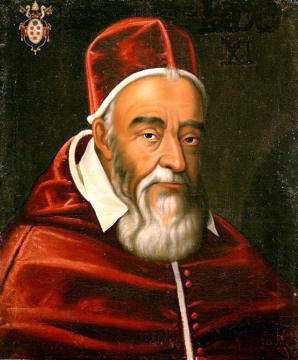
Pope Leo XI

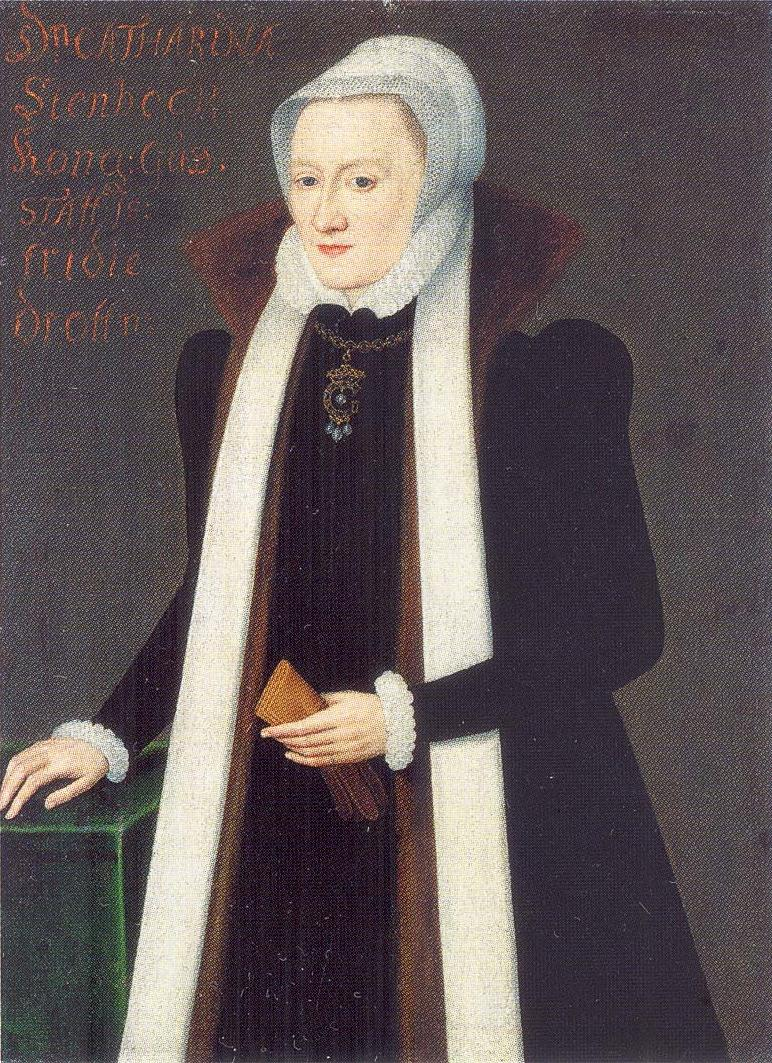
Katarina Stenbock

- February 11 – Pope Gregory XIV (d. 1591)
- January 7 – Edward Stafford, 3rd Baron Stafford, English baron (d. 1603)
- January 16 - Mohamed Thakurufaanu Al-Auzam (d. 1585)
- February 24 – Eléanor de Roucy de Roye, French noble (d. 1564)
- February 27 – Min Phalaung, Burmese monarch (d. 1593)
- February 28 – Cornelius Gemma, Dutch astronomer and astrologer (d. 1578)
- March 10 – William of Rosenberg, High Treasurer and High Burgrave of Bohemia (d. 1592)
- March 23 – Sophie of Brandenburg-Ansbach, princess of Brandenburg-Ansbach (d. 1587)
- May 31 – Alessandro Allori, Italian painter (d. 1607)
- June 2 – Pope Leo XI (d. 1605)
- June 18 – Jakub Krčín, Czech architect (d. 1604)
- June 21 – Leonhard Rauwolf, German physician and botanist (d. 1596)
- June 24 – Joanna of Austria, Princess of Portugal (d. 1573)
- July 4 – William the Younger, Duke of Brunswick-Lüneburg (d. 1592)
- July 21 – García Hurtado de Mendoza, 5th Marquis of Cañete, Royal Governor of Chile (d. 1609)
- July 22 – Katarina Stenbock, queen of Gustav I of Sweden (d. 1621)
- August 21 – Shimazu Yoshihiro, Japanese samurai and warlord (d. 1619)
- September 6 – Emanuel van Meteren, Flemish historian (d. 1612)
- September 18 – Henry Brandon, 2nd Duke of Suffolk (d. 1551)
- October 16 – Niwa Nagahide, Japanese warlord (d. 1585)
- November 9 – Nanda Bayin, King of Burma (d. 1600)
- December 12 – Gilbert Génébrard, Roman Catholic archbishop (d. 1597)
- December 28 – Martin Eisengrein, German theologian (d. 1578)
- date unknown
  - Federico Barocci, Italian painter (d. 1612)
  - Niels Kaas, Danish chancellor (d. 1594)
  - James Melville of Halhill, Scottish historian (d. 1617)
  - Thomas North, English translator (d. c. 1604)
  - Giaches de Wert, Flemish composer (d. 1596)
  - Benedict Pereira, Spanish theologian (d. 1610)

== Deaths ==
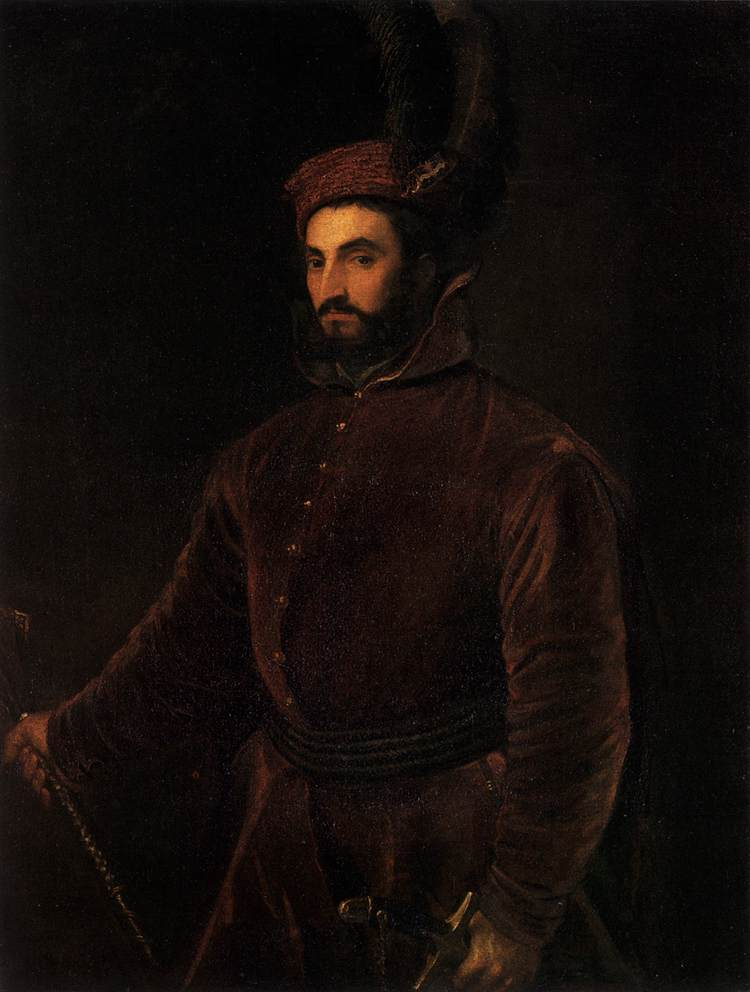
Ippolito de' Medici

- February 18 – Heinrich Cornelius Agrippa, German alchemist and occult writer (b. 1486)
- February 28 – Wolter von Plettenberg, Master of the Livonian Order (b. 1450)
- April 4 – Beatrix of Baden, Margravine of Baden, Countess Palatine consort of Simmern (b. 1492)
- May 4 (executed by Henry VIII of England):
  - Saint John Houghton, Carthusian monk
  - Saint Robert Lawrence, Carthusian monk
  - Saint Augustine Webster, Prior of the London Charterhouse
  - Saint Richard Reynolds, Bridgettine monk of Syon
- May 26 – Francesco Berni, Italian poet (b. 1497)
- June 12 – Elisabeth Wandscherer, Dutch Anabaptist
- June 19 – Sebastian Newdigate, Carthusian monk and martyr (b. 1500)
- June 22 – John Fisher, Bishop of Rochester (executed) (b. c. 1469)
- July 6 – Sir Thomas More, English lawyer, writer, and politician (executed) (b. 1478)
- July 11 – Joachim I Nestor, Elector of Brandenburg (b. 1484)
- August 10 – Ippolito de' Medici, ruler of Florence (poisoned) (b. 1509)
- September – George Nevill, 5th Baron Bergavenny (b. 1469)
- September 23 – Catherine of Saxe-Lauenburg, queen of Gustav I of Sweden (b. 1513)
- November 17 – Piero de Ponte, 45th Grandmaster of the Knights Hospitaller (b. 1462)
- December 29 – Matsudaira Kiyoyasu, Japanese daimyo (b. 1511)
- December 31 – William Skeffington, Lord Deputy of Ireland (b. 1465)
- date unknown
  - Jodocus Badius, Flemish pioneer of printing (b. 1462)
  - Canghali of Kazan, khan of Qasim and Kazan (b. 1516)
  - Bartolomeo Tromboncino, Italian composer (b. 1470)
  - Feliks Zamoyski, Polish noble
