= Ottoman embassy to France (1533) =

Initial French-Ottoman diplomatic contact

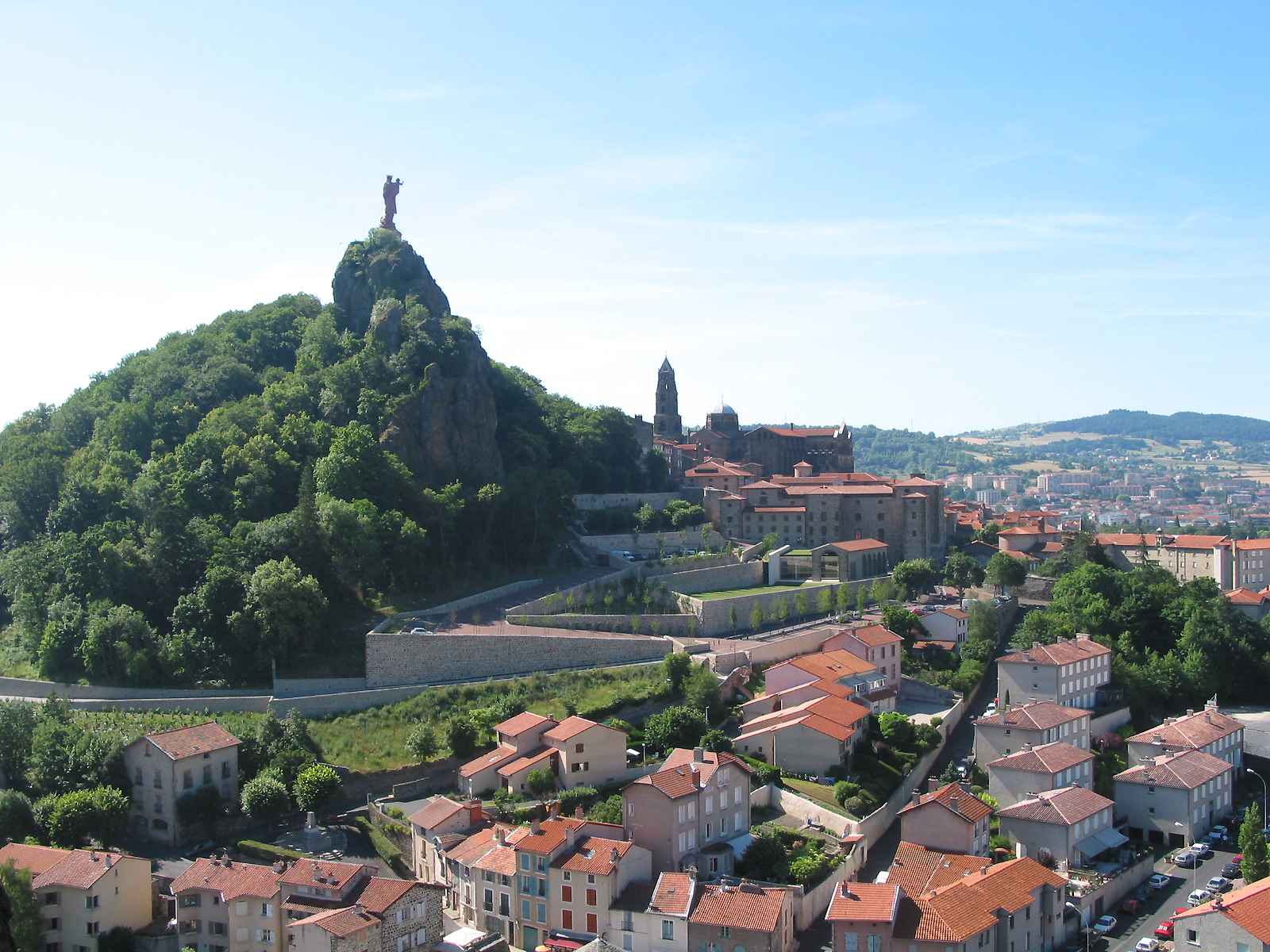
The Ottoman embassy travelled to Puy-en-Velay to meet with the French king Francis I.

An Ottoman embassy to France was sent in 1533 by Hayreddin Barbarossa, the Ottoman Governor of Algiers, vassal of the Ottoman Emperor Suleiman the Magnificent.

A safe-conduct is thought to have been obtained in 1532 for the embassy by the Ottoman interpreter and agent Janus Bey from the French ambassador Antonio Rincon. Janus Bey was at that time in Venice meeting with the Venetian government.

The embassy arrived on galleys somewhere between Hyères and Toulon in the beginning of the month of July 1533, and was led by Sherif Raïs. The embassy was received in Marseille by a delegation of merchants, while Francis I was travelling southward to the same city, where he was supposed to attend the wedding of his son Henri d'Orléans to Catherine de Médicis.

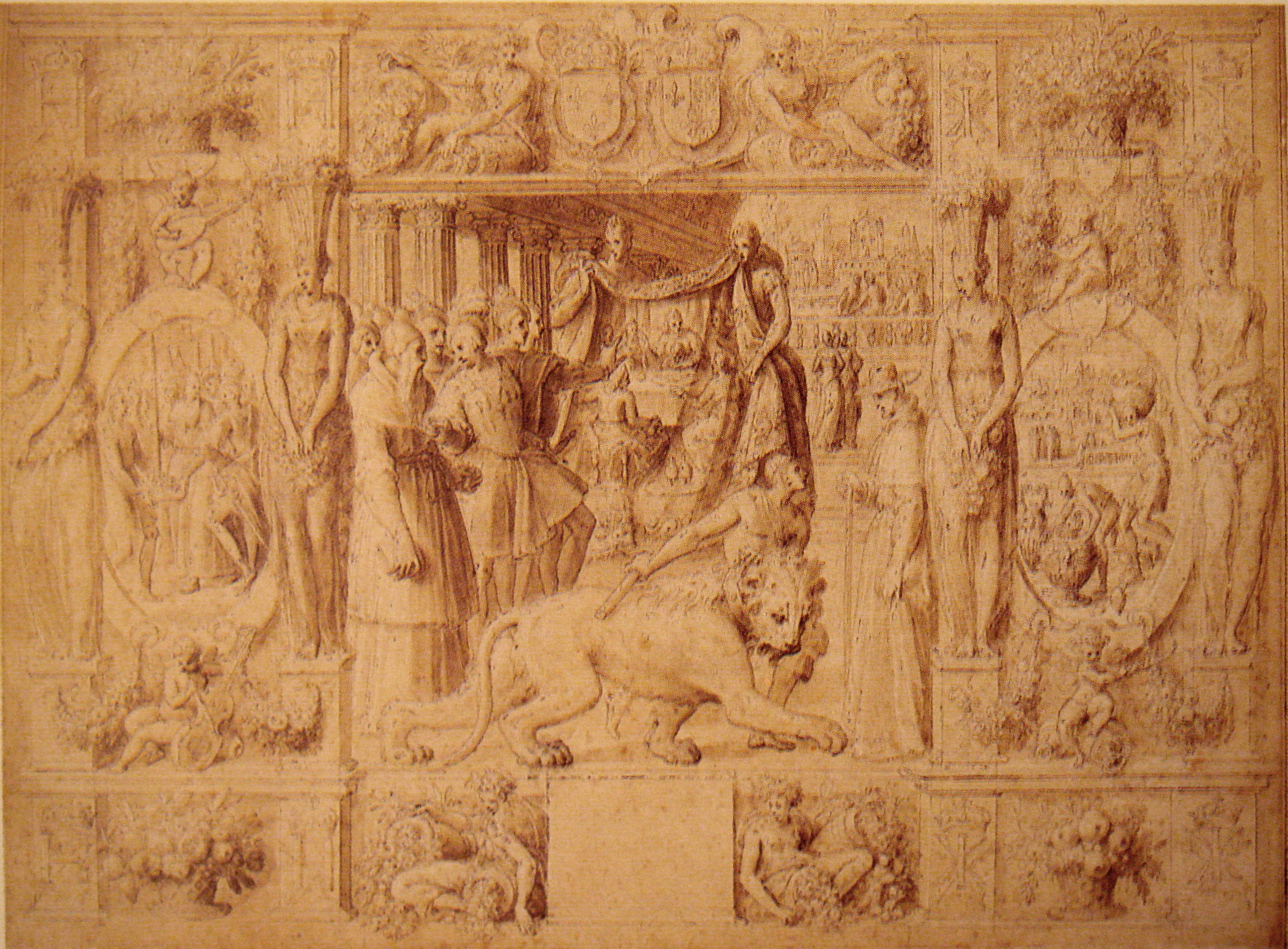
The Lion of Barbarossa by Antoine Caron, circa 1562, thought to depict the lion given to Francis I during the 1533 embassy.

As diplomatic gift, the Ottoman embassy disembarked wild animals, including the famous "Lion of Barbarossa", as well as Christian prisoners, to the number of 100. The Ottoman group was welcomed by the French Admiral Baron de Saint-Blancard and then accompanied only to the region of Auvergne to meet with Francis I. On the way they were joined by the French ambassador to the Porte Antonio Rincon, and they finally arrived at Puy-en-Velay on 16 July 1533 to meet with the king.

The embassy was received by king Francis I on 19 July. English ambassadors also participated to the meeting. The Ottoman ambassador read a "Declaration of mutual friendship between the Kingdoms of France and Algiers" and a three-year trade agreement was sealed. The chains of the Christian prisoners were solemnly broken in front of the king.

Francis I would in turn dispatch Antonio Rincon to Barbarossa in North Africa and then to Suleiman the Magnificent in Asia Minor.

Francis I's rival Charles V was informed of these encounters, and expressed great worry at these beginnings of a Franco-Ottoman alliance.

A Second Ottoman embassy to France would again visit Francis I the following year, in 1534.

== See also ==
- Franco-Ottoman alliance
- Ottoman embassy to France (1534)
