= Siege of Corfu (1537) =

1537 siege

- Part of the Ottoman–Venetian War (1537–1540)
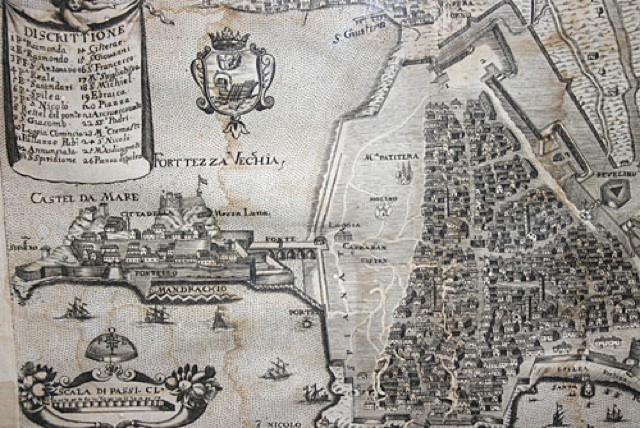
- The French and Ottoman fleets joined at the siege of Corfu in early September 1537.
Date	August–September 1537
Location	Corfu
Result	Venetian victory: Ottomans fail to capture Corfu.

Belligerents
Ottoman Empire; France	Republic of Venice

Commanders and leaders
Suleiman the Magnificent; Şehzade Mehmed; Şehzade Selim; Ayas Mehmed Pasha (Kingdom of France) Bertrand d'Ornesan	(Republic of Venice) Unknown

Strength
: 320 ships 25,000 soldiers 320 ships (Kingdom of France) : 13 ships	Unknown

The siege of Corfu in 1537 was led by the Ottoman Emperor Suleiman the Magnificent, against the Republic of Venice-held island of Corfu. It is part of the Ottoman–Venetian War (1537–1540), one of the numerous Ottoman–Venetian Wars of the period.

== Background ==
For 1537 important combined operations had been agreed upon between France and the Ottoman Empire as part of the Franco-Ottoman alliance, in which the Ottomans would attack Charles V's territories in southern Italy under Hayreddin Barbarossa, and Francis I would attack his territories in northern Italy with 50,000 men. Suleiman led an army of 300,000 from Constantinople to Albania, with the objective of transporting them to Italy with the fleet. The Ottoman fleet gathered in Avlona, in the Albania, with 250 galleys, accompanied by the French ambassador Jean de La Forêt. They landed in Castro, Apulia by the end of July 1537, and departed two weeks later with many prisoners. Barbarossa had laid waste to the region around Otranto, carrying about 10,000 people into slavery. However, Francis failed to meet his commitment, and instead attacked the Netherlands.

The Republic of Venice was functionally neutral, having previously rejected an alliance with Charles V against the Ottomans, but as relations with Francis and Suleiman deteriorated, their Senate ordered the Venetian admiral Girolamo Pesaro to have his fleet ready in case of a Franco-Ottoman turn against them. Venetian ships also had incidents with Barbarossa's fleet, now composed by 320 sails. At the same time, grand imperial admiral Andrea Doria defeated one of the Ottoman fleets in the Battle of Antipaxos, after which Doria let the Turks capture a forged letter where he pretended to be in alliance with Venice. By August 14, Suleiman decided to abandon southern Italy and strike against the republic.

== Siege ==
The Ottoman fleet departed from Southern Italy and headed to Corfu in August, while Suleiman equally leaft Avlona for Corfu on 19 August 1537. The 320 ship fleet started bombarding Corfu on 26 August. Ottoman troops amounting to 25,000 men were landed on the island of Corfu. At the siege, the Ottomans were met by the French Admiral Baron de Saint-Blancard, who had left Marseille on 15 August with 12 galleys, and arrived at Corfu in early September 1537. Saint-Blancard in vain attempted to convince the Ottomans to again raid the coasts of Apulia, Sicily, and the March of Ancona, but it was to no avail.

On September 11, the Venetian senate reached out to Pope Paul III, asking for the assistance of the Papal armada and the Knights Hospitaller. They also ordered Pesaro to rendezvous with Venetian reinforcements in Brindisi, but refrain still from sailing against the great Ottoman fleet. They then called Doria to request the help of the imperial armada. The plan was for Venice, the emperor and the Pope to form a grand army. However, possibly not being informed in time, Doria failed to appear in Brindisi, where all the available Venetian ships awaited.

Eventually Suleiman, with his camp ravaged by bad weather, and worried by a plague among his troops, decided to return with his fleet to Istanbul by September 15 without having captured Corfu. Two days later, Doria arrived near Corfu with 100 ships, including the Hospitaller squad with the great carrack Santa Anna, to discover the siege had already been lifted. He was later accused of having dragged his feet due to the ancient rivalry between Genoa and Venice.

== Aftermath ==
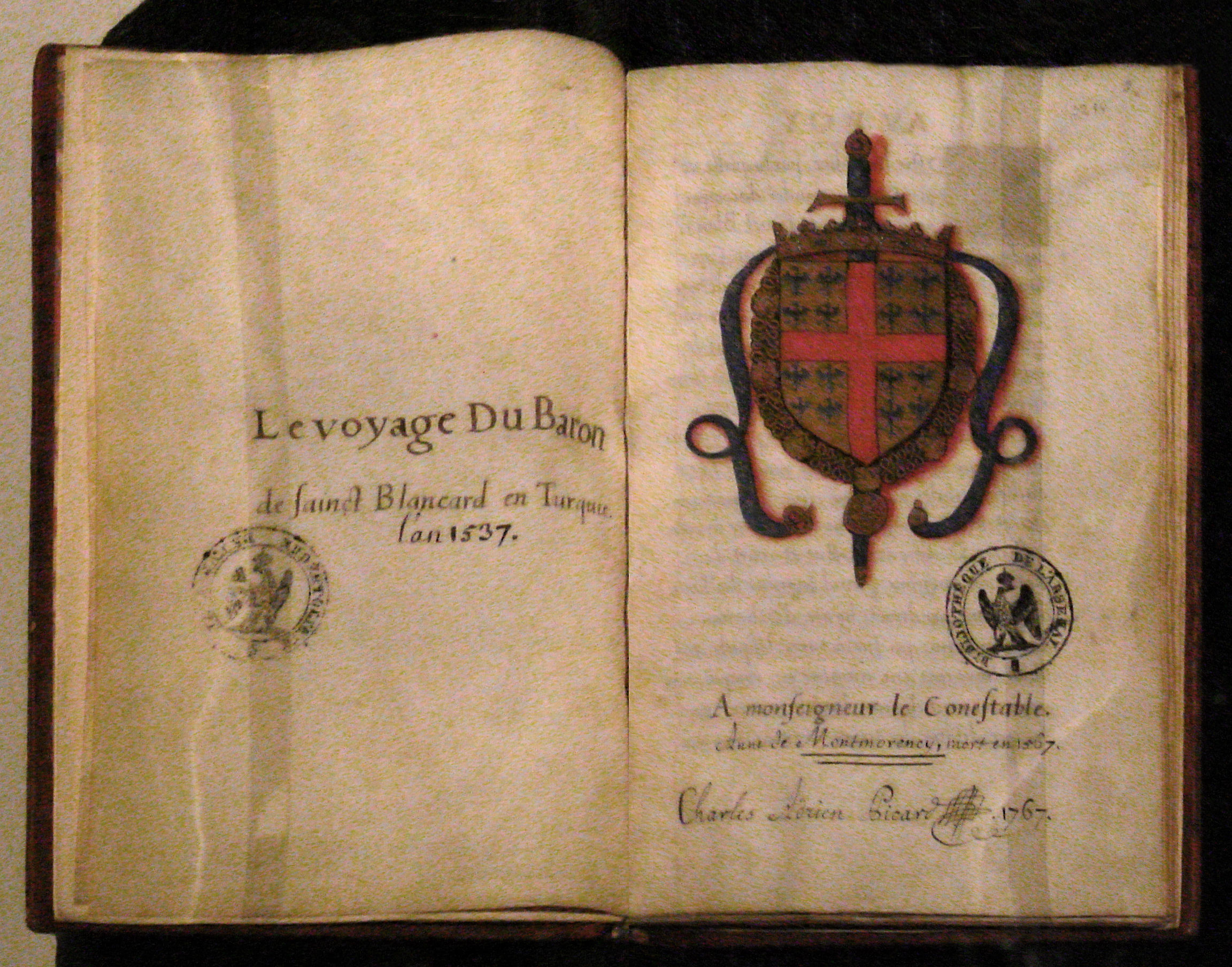
Le Voyage du Baron de Saint Blancard en Turquie, by Jean de la Vega, after 1538

French ambassador Jean de La Forêt became seriously ill and died around that time. Francis I finally penetrated into Italy, and reached Rivoli on 31 October 1537. The fleet of Saint-Blancard wintered in Chios until 17 February 1538. It was decided that three ships would go to Constantinople, while the rest of the fleet returned to France. In Constantinople, they were received by the French ambassador Charles de Marillac. Barbarossa provided for the expenses, and the French galleys finally left on 11 April 1538 to return to Nice through Monastir.

A consequence of the siege was that the Venetians decided to form an alliance with the Pope and Charles V against the Ottomans. On 18 June 1538, Francis I signed the Truce of Nice with Charles V, thereby temporarily abandoning the Franco-Ottoman alliance.
