= Janus Bey =

Greek ambassador and interpreter for the Ottoman Empire (c. 1500–1541/2)

- Born: Late 15th century Modon
- Died: 1541/42
- Occupations: Interpreter (dragoman), Ambassador
- Known for: Ambassadorship for the Ottoman Empire

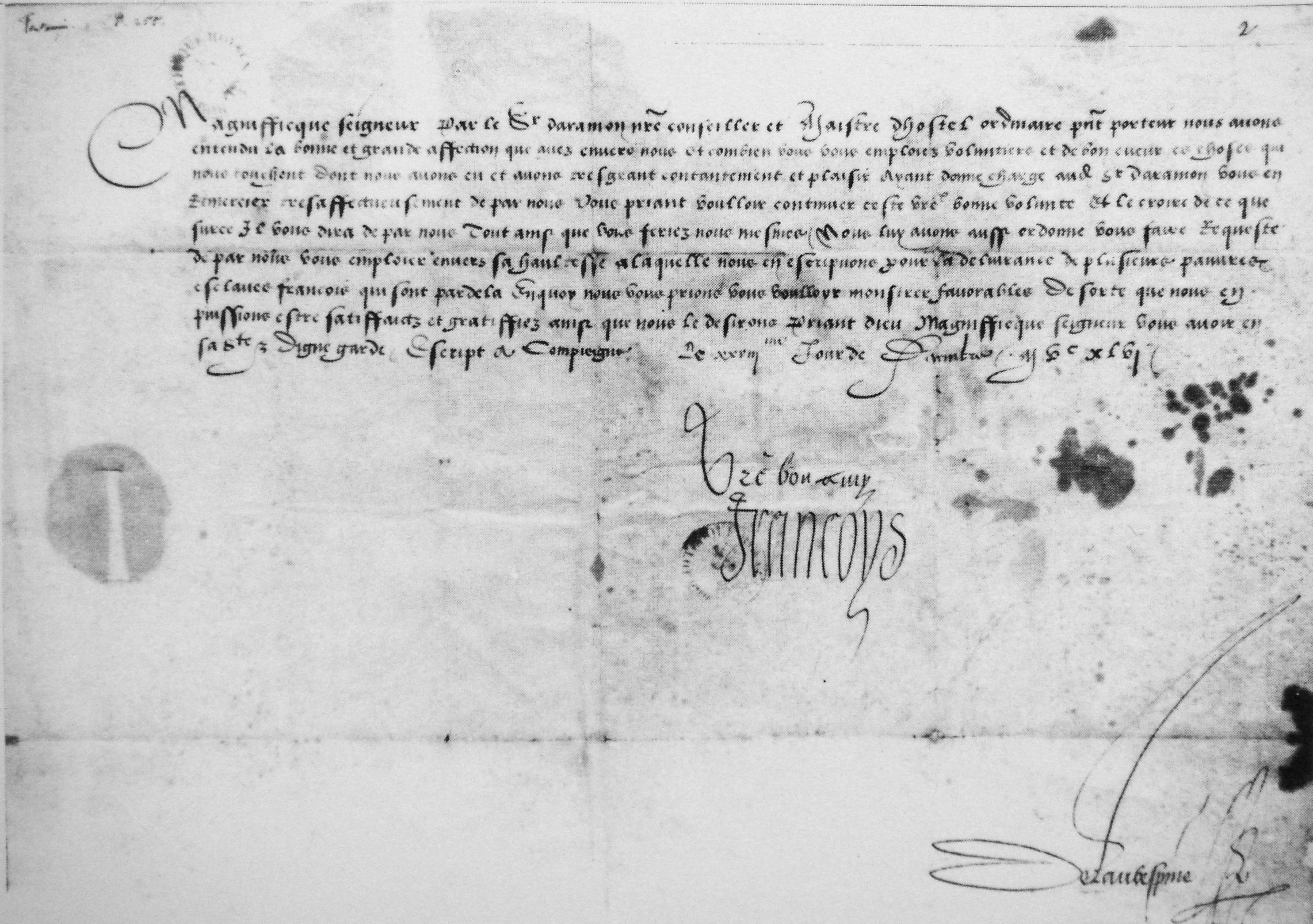
Letter of Francis I to the Drogman Janus Bey, 28 December 1546, delivered by D'Aramon.

Janus Bey, in Turkish Yunus Bey (born in Modon at the end of the 15th century; died 1541/42) was a Greek who became an interpreter (dragoman) and ambassador for the Ottoman Empire.

In 1532 he visited Venice and had meetings with the Venetian government. He was considered as the ambassador for the Ottoman Empire, was well received and was the beneficiary of large presents from the Venetians. In 1532, he apparently worked with French ambassador Antonio Rincon to obtain a safe-conduct for the Ottoman embassy to France (1533). In 1537 he was co-author with Alvise Gritti of an Italian booklet, published in Venice, on the government of the Ottoman Empire. The title was Opera noua la quale dechiara tutto il gouerno del gran Turcho. He founded a mosque in Constantinople, called the "Dragoman's Mosque" (Durughman Mesjidi). He died in 1541/42.

== See also ==
- Franco-Ottoman alliance
