= Ottoman embassy to France (1534) =

Second French-Ottoman diplomatic contact

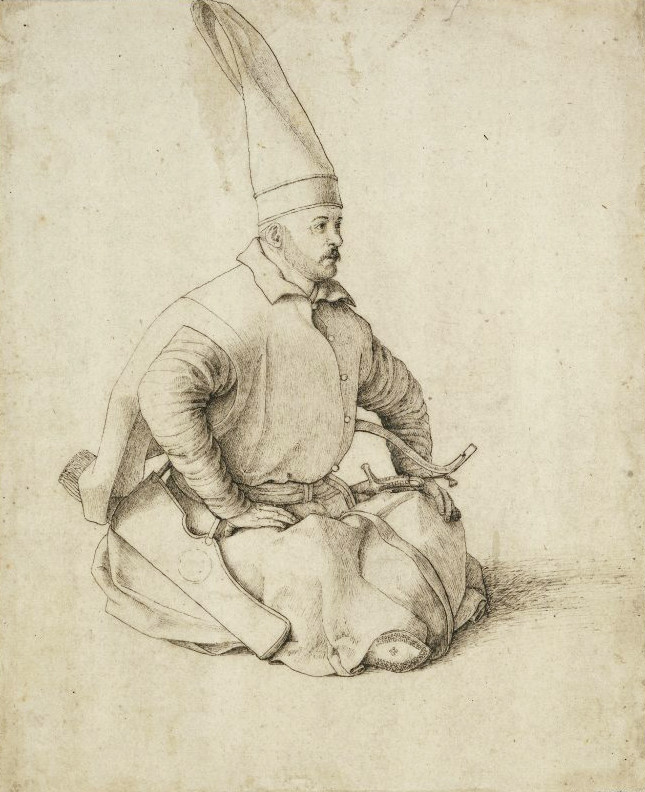
The 1534 Ottoman embassy was composed of Janissaries. Drawing by Gentile Bellini.

An Ottoman embassy to France occurred in 1534, with the objective to prepare and coordinate Franco-Ottoman offensives for the next year, 1535. The embassy closely followed a first Ottoman embassy to France in 1533, as well as the Conquest of Tunis by Hayreddin Barbarossa on 16 August 1534, which marked a strong reinforcement of Ottoman positions in the Western Mediterranean.

== Arrival of the embassy ==
The Ottoman delegation arrived from Constantinople via Tunis at the French harbour of Marseille in October 1534. The delegation included two French ambassadors to the Porte who had accompanied them from Constantinople: Antonio Rincon and Cesare Cantelmo.

The contemporary French writer and eyewitness Valbelle would comment:

"They were circulating through the city as if they were in Constantinople. It is so new to see Turks like this, something that was never seen before."

— Valbelle.

The delegation was not composed of pirates, but of janissaries, clad in uniforms with immaculate turbans. They travelled overland with Antonio Rincon, and reached Francis I at his court in Châtellerault.

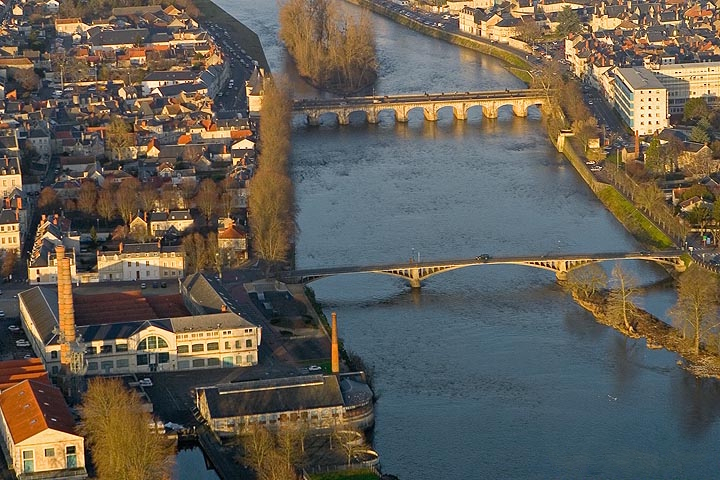
The embassy visited Francis I at his court in Châtellerault.

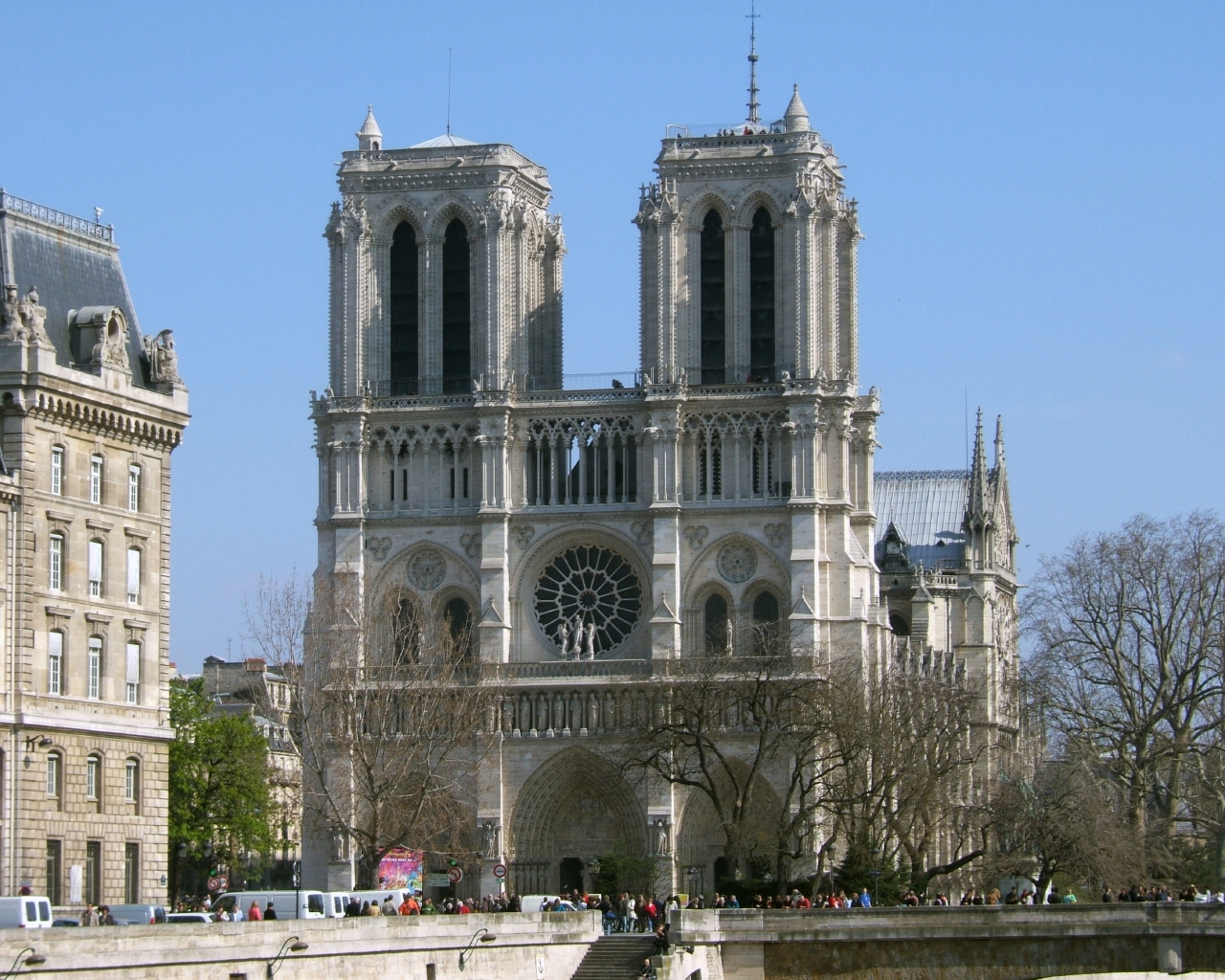
In January 1535, the embassy attended the execution of Protestants in front of Notre-Dame de Paris.

At that time, Francis I was confronted with the Affair of the Placards, in which Protestants issued pamphlets criticizing the Mass in view of stopping efforts at a Catholic–Protestant rapprochement. Francis I was severely criticized for his tolerance towards Protestants, and had to pursue them. The Ottoman ambassadors accompanied Francis I to Paris, and attended the burning of those responsible for the Affair, on 21 January 1535 in front of the Cathedral of Notre-Dame de Paris.

Together a master plan was established for 1535, combining a revolt of pro-French factions in Italy; an Ottoman attack on Apulia and Calabria; an attack by Barbarossa from Tunis on Sicily, Naples and Tuscany; and attacks by England, Scotland and Denmark on the Low Countries, with the help of the German princes allied to France William of Fürstenberg and Christopher of Württemberg.

== Departure and aftermath ==
The embassy departed Paris on 13 February 1535 with the new French ambassador to the Porte, Jean de la Forest, accompanied by Charles de Marillac and the scholar Guillaume de Postel. Jean de la Forest would successfully negotiate the Capitulations giving advantages and pre-eminence to France in relations with the Ottoman Empire. De la Forest also had secret instructions describing how he was to coordinate the military efforts between France and the Ottoman Empire:

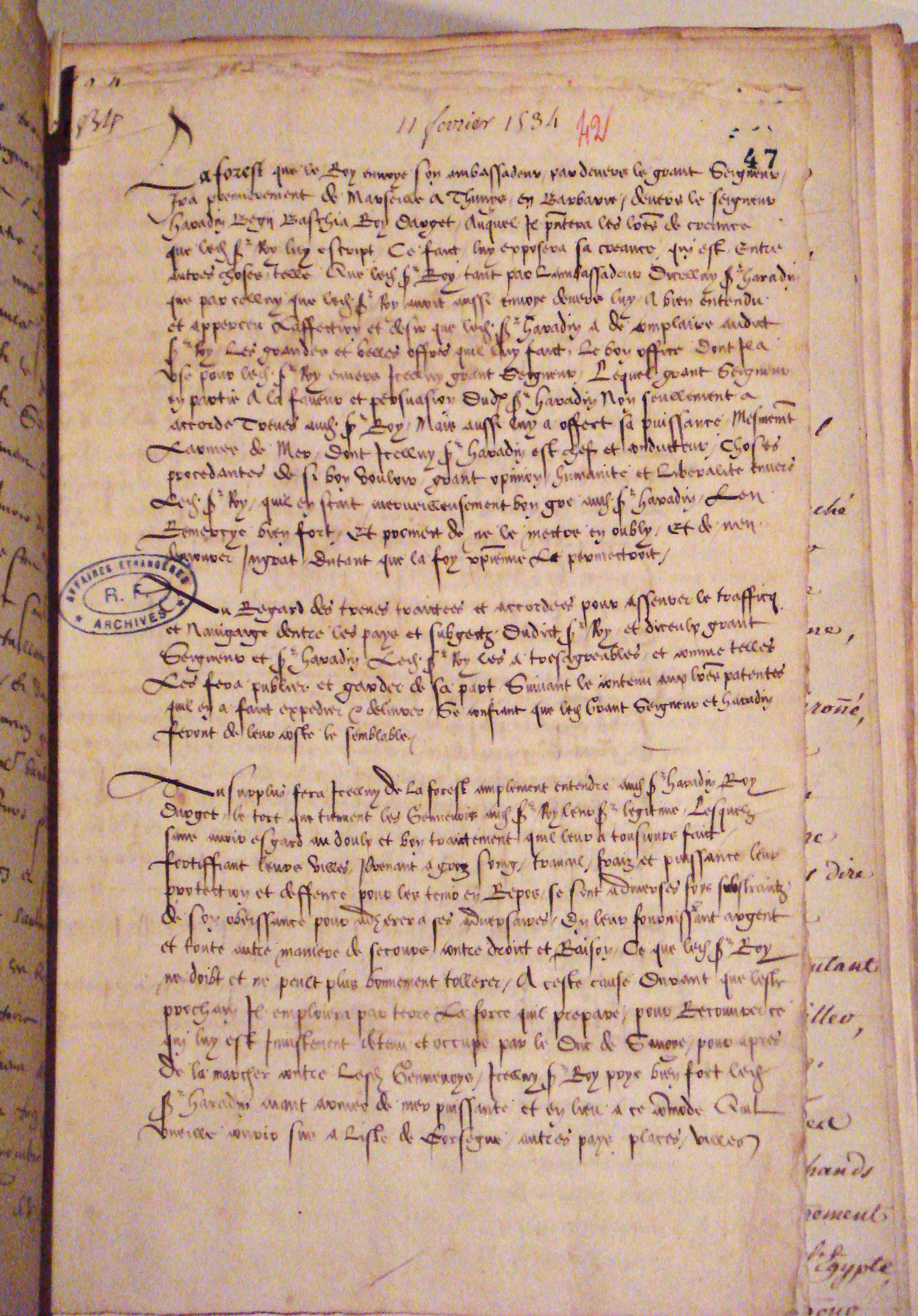
Military instructions to Jean de La Forêt, by Chancellor Antoine Duprat (copy), 11 February 1535.

"Jean de la Forest, whom the King sends to meet with the Grand Signor [Suleiman the Magnificent], will first go from Marseilles to Tunis, in Barbary, to meet sir Haradin, king of Algiers, who will direct him to the Grand Signor. To this objective, next summer, he [the King of France] will send the military force he is preparing to recover what it unjustly occupied by the Duke of Savoy, and from there, to attack the Genoese. This king Francis I strongly prays sir Haradin, who has a powerful naval force as well as a convenient location [Tunisia], to attack the island of Corsica and other lands, locations, cities, ships and subjects of Genoa, and not to stop until they have accepted and recognized the king of France. The King, besides the above land force, will additionally help with his naval force, which will comprise at least 50 vessels, of which 30 galleys, and the rest galeasses and other vessels, accompanied by one of the largest and most beautiful carracks that ever was on the sea. This fleet will accompany and escort the army of sir Haradin, which will also be refreshed and supplied with food and ammunition by the King, who, by these actions, will be able to achieve his aims, for which he will be highly grateful to sir Haradin.[...]
To the Grand Signor, Monsieur de La Forest must ask for a million in gold, and for his army to enter first in Sicily and Sardinia and establish there a king whom La Forest will nominate, a person who has credit and knows well these islands which he will retain in the devotion of, and under the shade and support of the King [of France]. Furthermore, he will recognize this blessing, and send tribute and pension to the Grand Signor to reward him for the financial support he will have provided to the King, as well as the support of his navy which will be fully assisted by the King [of France]."

— Military instruction from Francis I to Jean de la Forest, 1535.

The embassy arrived in Marseille on 3 April 1535 and departed on 11 April 1535 on the Ottoman galleys that had been waiting there. De la Forest departed together on a French galley, La Dauphine. They first stopped at Tunis, where Barbarossa armed a special galley to transport De la Forest to Constantinople.

Charles V managed to wreck the plans of Francis I by launching a major attack on the Ottomans with the Conquest of Tunis in June 1535, immediately after the departure of the embassy. Concomitantly, Pope Paul III issued an interdiction for Christians to fight between themselves during the time Charles V was fighting the Ottomans, effectively precluding Francis I from launching his offensive. At the same time, Suleiman himself was caught up in a bitter campaign of the Ottoman–Safavid War (1532–1555), which prevented him from participating to offensives in Europe during 1535.

== See also ==
- Franco-Ottoman alliance
- Ottoman embassy to France (1533)
