= Madeleine Lartessuti =

Madeleine Lartessuti (1478–1543), also known as Magdeleine Lartessuti or Madeleine Lartessuti de Medicis, was a French shipper and banker in Marseille who became one of the best-known female maritime traders of her time.

== Biography ==
Her father was the lawyer Pons Lartessuti of Avignon, France, and her mother was Thore de Medicis (d. 1490). She was married on 31 January 1492, at about the age of twelve, to a French aristocrat, Joachim de Sade.

In 1502, she left her husband in Avignon and settled in Marseille, where she engaged in sea maritime trade with North Africa, Italy, and Egypt. She was also involved in finance and became a nationally powerful banker for the king. She financed ships for King Francis I of France, and provided loans and supplies for Bertrand d'Ornesan, Baron de Saint-Blancart, Vice Admiral of the East Mediterranean Fleet, who was reportedly also her lover. On 19 March 1539, d'Ornesan died.

Lartessuti provided a ship of her own to the Royal Navy.

After the death of her estranged spouse in 1540, she negotiated the help of the Pope to recover her dowry.
