= Bertrand d'Ornesan =

French admiral

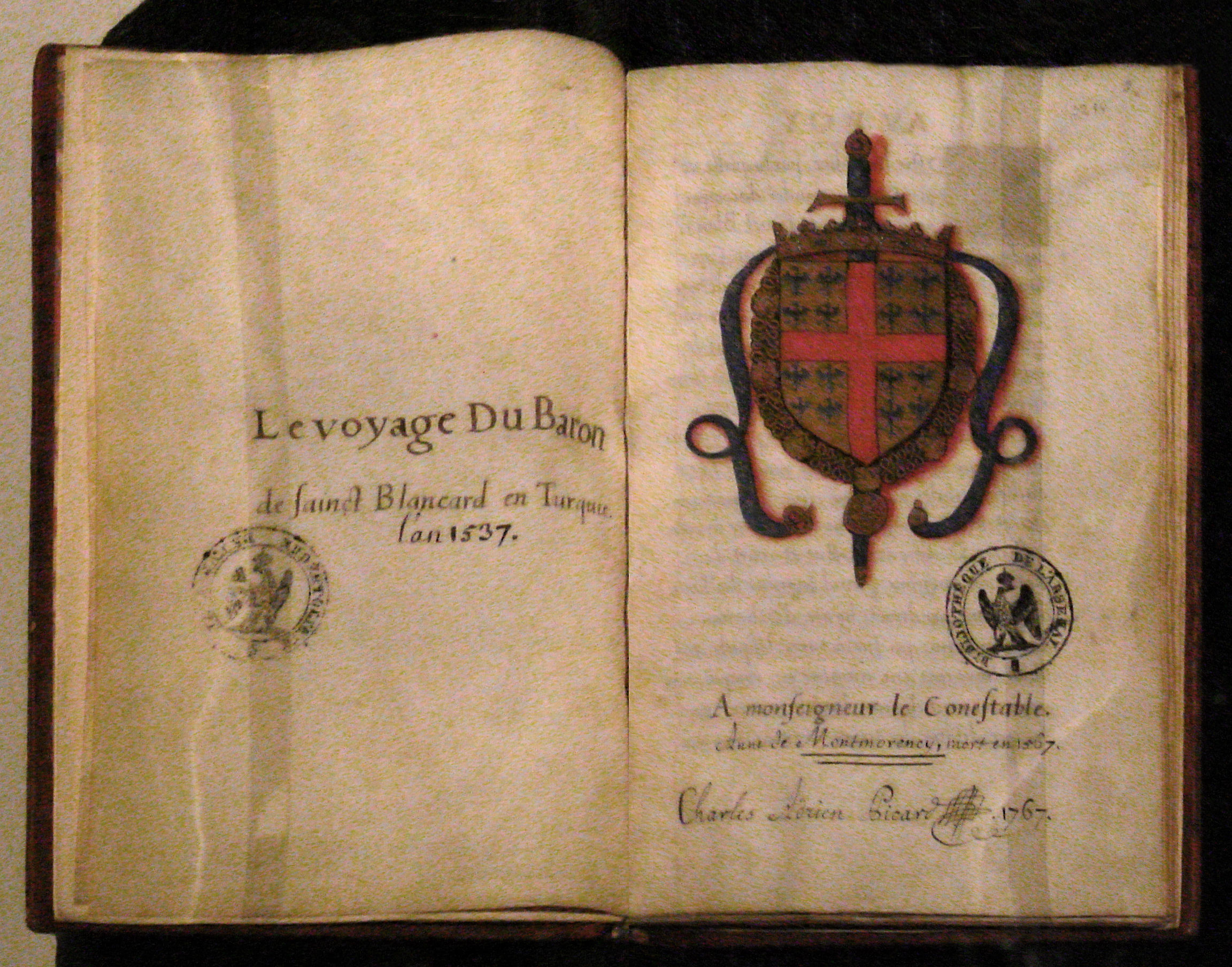
Le Voyage du Baron de Saint Blancard en Turquie, by Jean de la Vega, after 1538.

Bertrand d'Ornesan, also Bertrand d'Ornezan, Baron de Saint-Blancard (French pronunciation: [bɛʁtʁɑ̃ dɔʁnəzɑ̃ də sɛ̃ blɑ̃kaʁ]; d. 1540), was a French admiral in the service of King Francis I of France. He was general of the galleys of the Mediterranean (Amiral de la Flotte du Levant).

Bertrand d'Ornesan tried to establish a French trading post at Pernambuco, Brazil in 1531.

In 1533 Bertrand d'Ornesan joined the Ottoman embassy to France (1533) going to meet Francis I.

For about twenty years, he was a business partner of the Marseilles banker Madeleine Lartessuti, who financed his fleet and was reportedly also his lover.

In 1537, Ornesan began a two-year involvement in operations with the Ottoman Empire under terms of the Franco-Ottoman alliance between Francis I and Suleiman the Magnificent. He led a fleet of galleys to Corfu to join the fleet of Barbarossa at the siege of Corfu, but finally failed to convince the Ottomans to participate in a proposed major expedition against Italy. Saint-Blancard had left Marseille on 15 August with 12 galleys and arrived at Corfu in early September 1537. Eventually Suleiman, worried by a plague among his troops, decided to return with his fleet to Istanbul by mid-September without having captured Corfu.

The fleet of Saint-Blancard wintered in Chios until 17 February 1538. It was decided that three ships would go to Constantinople, while the rest of the fleet returned to France. In Constantinople, they were received by the French ambassador Charles de Marillac. Hayreddin Barbarossa provided for the expenses, and the French galleys finally left on 11 April 1538 to return to Nice through Monastir.

Jean de la Vega, a member of his staff, wrote the account of his travels.
