= Jean de la Vega =

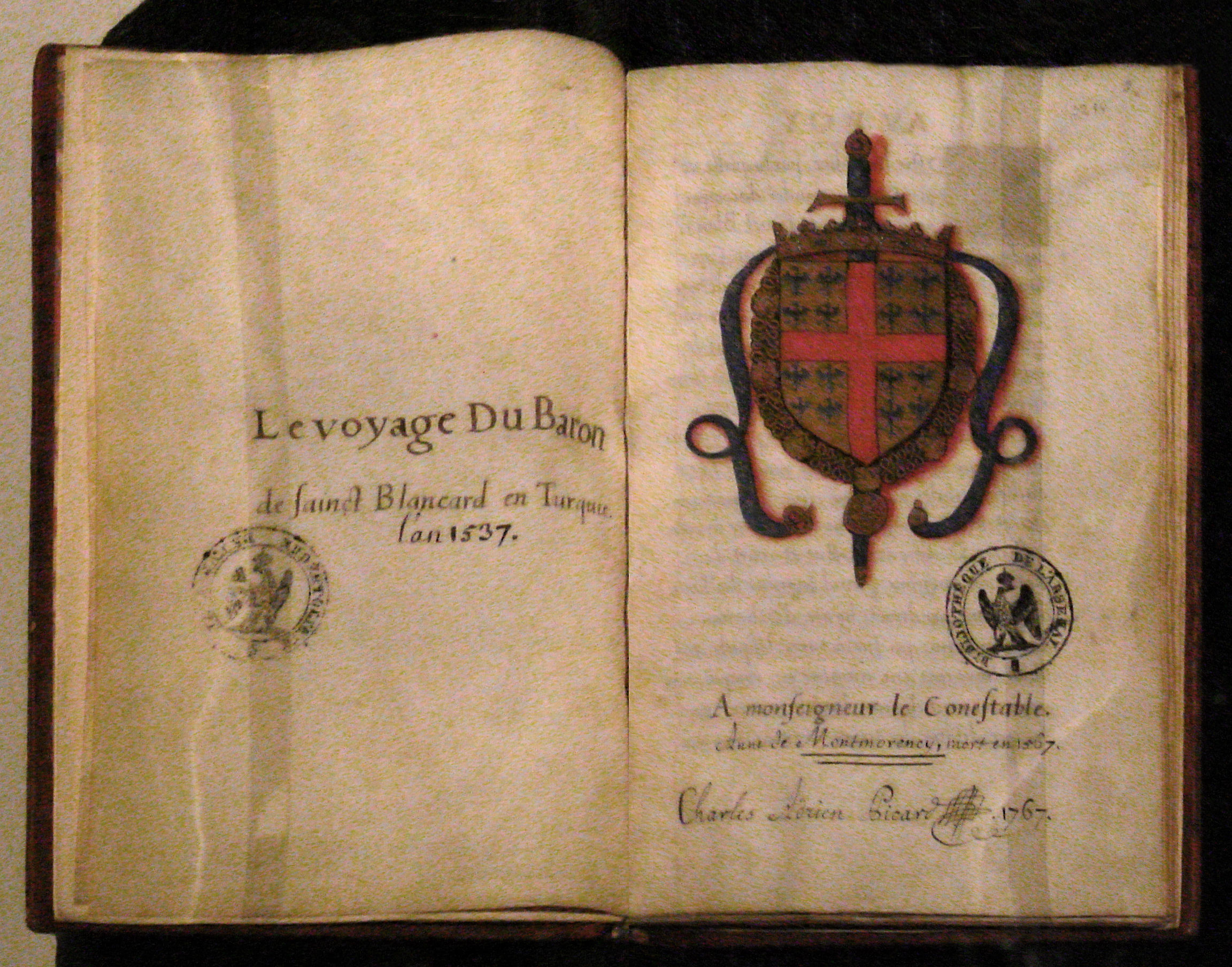
Le Voyage du Baron de Saint Blancard en Turquie, by Jean de la Vega, after 1538.

Jean de la Vega, also Jehan de la Vega, was a French traveler and writer of the 16th century. He was a member of the fleet Bertrand d'Ornesan which collaborated with the Ottomans under the Franco-Ottoman alliance.

As a member of D'Ornessan's staff, he traveled to Istanbul on a French galley, and wrote a famous account of his travels, Le Voyage du Baron de Saint Blancard en Turquie. He was a witness of the Siege of Corfu (1537), and also witnessed the depredations of the Ottoman fleet in Christian territory.

== See also ==
- Franco-Ottoman alliance
