= Italian War of 1536–1538 =

Eighth phase of the Italian Wars (1536-1538)

- Part of the Italian Wars
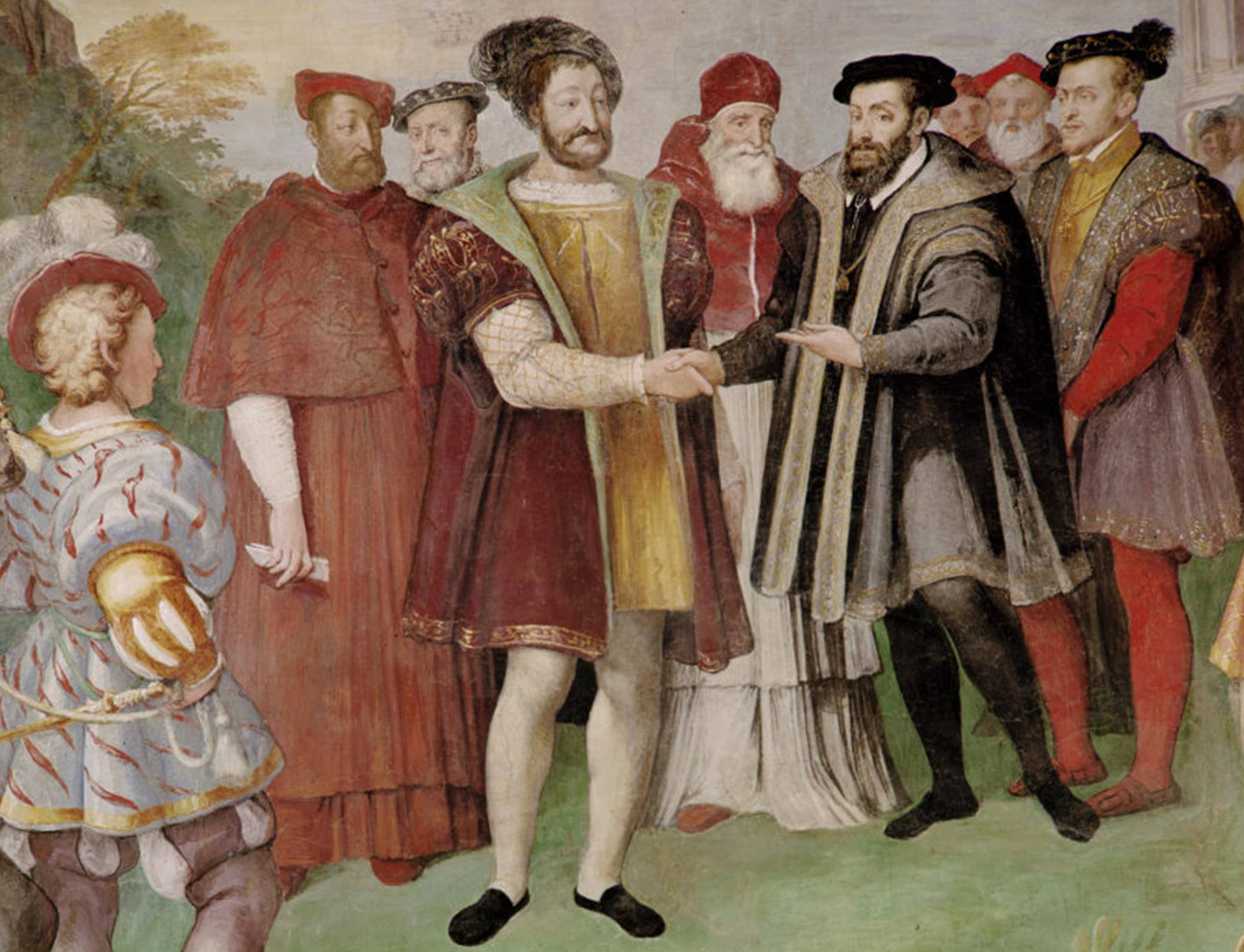
- The truce of Nice, 1538, between Francis I and Charles V, and mediated by Pope Paul III. Painting by Taddeo Zuccari.
Date	1536 – 18 June 1538
Location	Provence, Piedmont and Lombardy
Result	Truce of Nice
Territorial changes	Savoy and Piedmont acquired by France

Belligerents
Holy Roman Empire; Spain; Genoa	Kingdom of France; Ottoman Empire

Commanders and leaders
(Holy Roman Empire) (Spain) Emperor Charles V (Genoa) Andrea Doria (Spain) Álvaro de Bazán the Elder (Spain) Pedro de Toledo	(Kingdom of France) King Francis I (Kingdom of France) Anne de Montmorency; Suleiman the Magnificent; Hayreddin Barbarossa

The Italian war of 1536–1538 was a conflict between King Francis I of France and Charles V, Holy Roman Emperor and King of Spain. The objective was to achieve control over territories in Northern Italy, in particular the Duchy of Milan, which Charles had granted to his son Philip. The war saw French troops invading Northern Italy with the goal to capture Milan, and Imperial-Spanish troops invading France in retaliation.

The Truce of Nice, signed on June 18, 1538, ended hostilities, leaving Turin in French hands but effecting no significant change in the map of Italy. Overall, the Holy Roman Empire and Spain retained Milan and solidified Habsburg primacy over Italy, but Savoy and Piedmont were occupied by France. The war strengthened animosity between the Habsburgs and the French, and reinforced ties between France and the Ottoman Empire, which had sided with Francis I against Charles V.

== Causes ==
=== Long-term ===
In 1500, Louis XII made an agreement with Ferdinand II on dividing the Kingdom of Naples, as Frederick IV was removed from the Neapolitan throne. This was known as the Treaty of Grenada. This decision was heavily criticized by influential figures such as Niccolò Machiavelli, whose opinion was embraced by many of Italy's citizens as well. When Charles V came into power in 1519, he gained more of a reputation in Italy, as he joined Spain together with the Holy Roman Empire.

=== Short-term ===
The war began in 1536 between Emperor Charles V and Francis I of France commenced upon the death of Francesco II Sforza, the duke of Milan. Sforza had no children and died of a long and painful illness in 1535. Because he had no heirs, Francesco's dynasty was brought to an end by Charles V, whose niece, Christina of Denmark, was Francesco's wife. There were no local protests when Charles V took over the Duchy of Milan from either the people or other Italian states. This shift in power marked a new era for France, as Jean de La Forêt was brought in as an ambassador to the Ottoman Empire, a territory eagerly courted for its wide range of goods to trade and powerful military. Foret and Francis I secured an alliance with the Ottoman Empire, giving France a strong army, ready to attack targets such as Marseille and Piedmont, areas close to the Italian province of Genoa.

== Events ==
When Charles's son Philip inherited the duchy, Francis invaded Italy. Philippe de Chabot, a French general, led his army into Piedmont in March 1536, and proceeded to capture Turin the following month, but he failed to seize the heavily fortified Milan. In response, Charles invaded Provence, a region of France, advancing to Aix-en-Provence, and took Aix in August 1536. His admirals Andrea Doria and Álvaro de Bazán the Elder similarly conquered cities through the coast of Provence, stopping only at Marseille, which was too well defended and remained in control of its hinterland. Charles ultimately withdrew to Spain rather than attacking the heavily fortified Avignon. There is also a story that French troops deliberately left over-ripe fruit on the trees in an attempt to give Charles's troops dysentery.

While Charles V was busy fighting for territory in France, Francis I's armies received massive reinforcements in Piedmont in terms of generals, troops, and horses on a march headed for Genoa. France had secured an alliance with the Ottoman Empire in 1536 through the diplomatic efforts of Jean de La Forêt, France's ambassador to the Ottoman Empire. A Franco-Ottoman fleet under Barbarossa was stationed in Marseille by the end of 1536, threatening Genoa, by planning to attack simultaneously with the French troops marching on land towards the city. However, when they found out the defenses of the city had been recently reinforced, the French elected to march instead onto Piedmont, capturing many towns there. In winter, Bazán the Elder routed another Franco-Ottoman fleet under Ali of Algiers near Collioure.

In 1537 Barbarossa raided the Italian coast of Apulia as a preparation to a Franco-Ottoman land invasion of Naples, but the latter failed to materialize due to local resistance under Viceroy Pedro de Toledo. Doria also scored a naval victory in Antipaxos at the rear guard of the Ottoman armada. Barbarossa then laid a laid a siege on the Venetian colony of Corfu, although this provided only limited assistance to the French.

With Charles V squeezed between the French invasion and the Ottomans, and Francis failing to advance in any side, the two ultimately made peace with the Truce of Nice on 18 June 1538. Pope Paul III acted as a mediator, desiring to make peace between the warring Christians to launch a league against the Ottoman Empire.

== Truce of Nice ==
The Truce of Nice, signed on June 18, 1538, ended the war, leaving Turin in French hands but affecting no significant change in the map of Italy. Francis was forced to abandon his aspirations to seize Milan, while Charles had to abandon his to give Piedmont back to the House of Savoy. Andrea Doria, a statesman respected by the Pope, influenced greatly this outcome by advising Paul not to disturb Imperial possessions in Italy. The Truce of Nice was notable because Charles and Francis refused to sit in the same room together because of their intense mutual hatred. Paul III was forced to carry out negotiations by going from room to room, trying to reach an agreement between the two leaders.

== Aftermath ==
After the war, Charles V participated in Paul III's Holy League against the Ottomans. However, it disbanded after being routed by intense infighting at the Battle of Preveza on September 28, 1538.

Overall, by retaining Milan, Spain gained significant control over Italy. This war had meant that the independence of several Italian states had ended and that most of the Italian Peninsula would be ruled (or influenced) by foreign monarchs. The political fragmentation of Italy, and the lack of an unified response to pressures from both France and Spain, made it highly susceptible to European politics and foreign invasions. This settlement would not last long, as renewed war broke out in 1542. Moreover, different parts of the peninsula experienced severe degrees of devastation on the territory, cities, and infrastructure. On occasion, armies plundered cities and slaughtered across the countryside.

This war entrenched hostilities between the French and Spanish, as they would continue to vie for control over territory and influence in Europe. For example, even after the death of Francis I in 1547, Henry II, Francis’ successor, continued aggression against the Habsburg forces. The war weakened both countries financially, while it strengthened the alliance between the Ottomans and the French, for it took the both of them working together to make Charles V desire peace, in order to avoid a two-front war.
