= Hospice général =

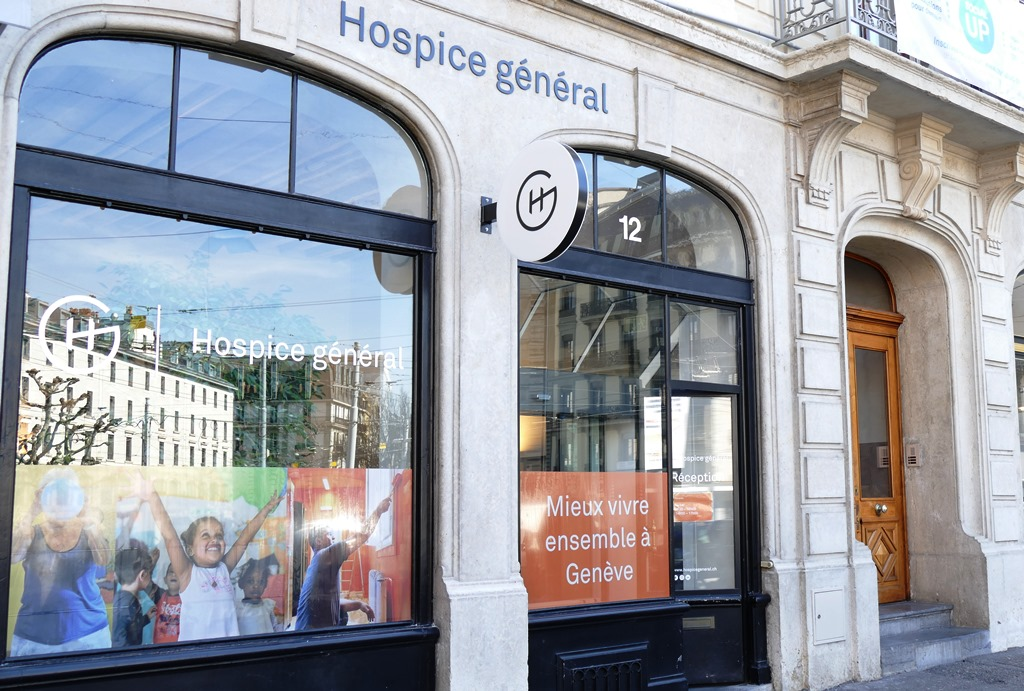
- Founded: 1535
- Type: Social service of the Republic and Canton of Geneva
- Headquarters: 12, Cours de Rive; 1211 Geneva 3
- Location: Geneva
- Region served: Switzerland
- Members: 29,900 beneficiaries (2016)
- Budget: 410 million Swiss francs (2016)
- Staff: 1150 employees (2016)
- Website: www.hospicegeneral.ch

The Hospice général is the main public assistance (welfare) office of the Republic and Canton of Geneva. The institution's main missions are: Social support and financial assistance for individuals and families who are without sufficient resources; Welcome and assistance, including financial help, for asylum seekers, along with providing living accommodations; Assistance and housing for troubled young adults; Management of a leisure center and two holiday homes for the elderly; Prevention of and information about social ills for all categories of the population.

The institution has existed since 1535, when it was founded as a charitable institution to provide assistance to the poor.

== History: from the Hôpital général to the Hospice général ==
=== Under the Ancien Régime (1535-1798) ===
On 14 November 1535, by a formal vote of Geneva's General Council, the assembly made up of all of the city's citizens, the seven charitable establishments then active in Geneva were merged into a single entity called the Hôpital général (the General Hospital). The aim was to provide material or financial assistance to “the poor young foundlings, widowed wives, old men and women, poor young girls, and all other manner of people both foreign and private of all nations who come seeking refuge in the aforesaid general hospital.” Taking advantage of the Sisters of St. Clare's departure for Annecy, the city requisitioned their convent in Bourg-de-Four in 1536 and installed the Hôpital général there.

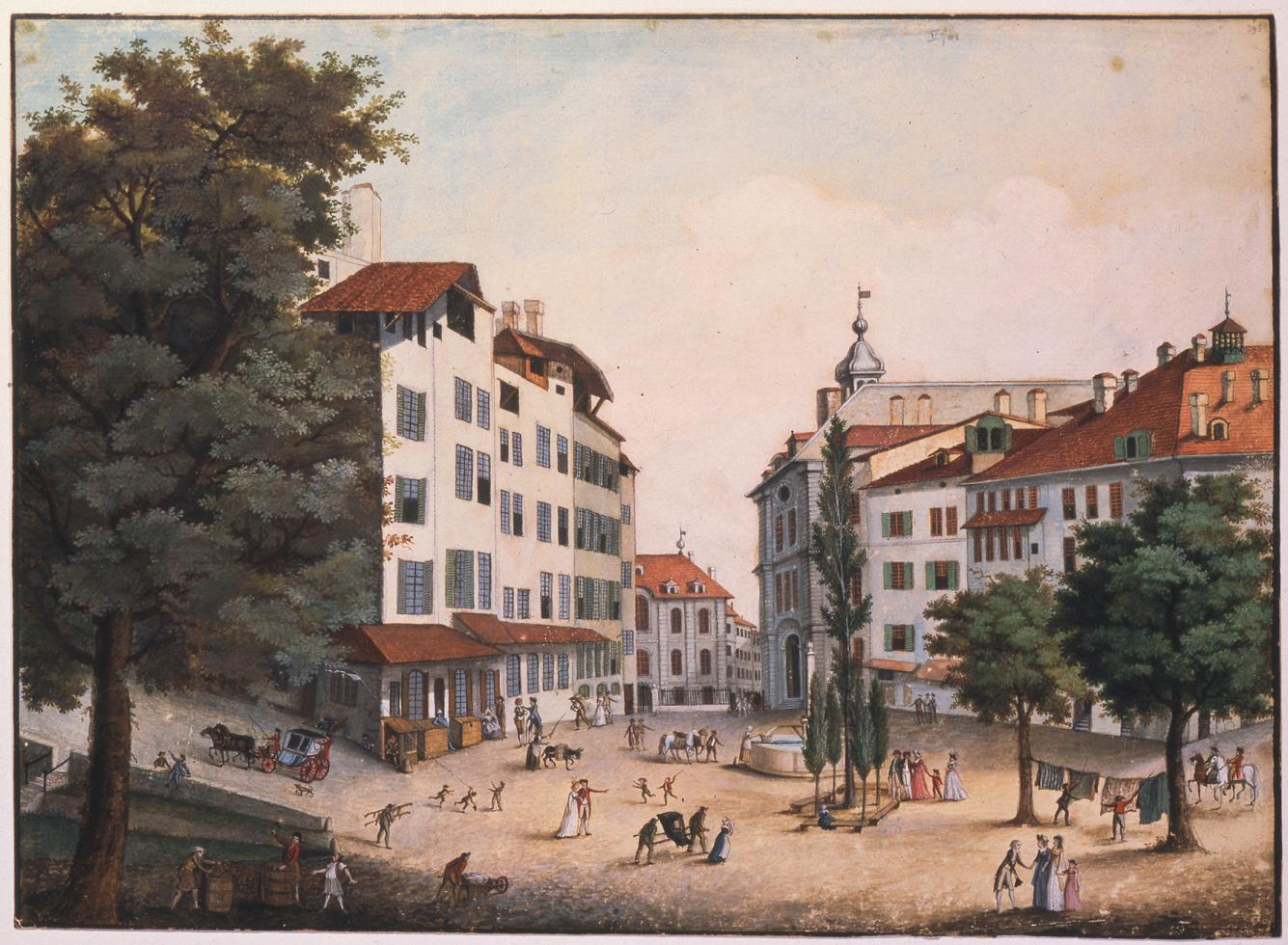
The Hôpital général, place Bourg-de-Four, late eighteenth century

At the time, public charity was guided by moral and devotional demands. Vagrants leading a dissolute life, for example, were excluded from public charity. The large numbers of beggars drawn to Geneva by the various fairs held there were considered undesirables and only reluctantly granted what was then known as a passade, that is, charity in the form of bread and wine allowed to those who were passing through. The archives from the period suggest that the Hôpital général was overwhelmed by the requests for assistance and that all citizens at one time or another came to beg for food or clothing. Some sheltered there and discipline was strictly imposed.

This form of repression coupled with charity sprang up again later when beggars were regularly interned, a practice that was widespread in Europe throughout the seventeenth century. In 1631, for example, the Discipline was founded, a correctional establishment for wayward young women, prostitutes and young delinquents. Everyone was put to work, which enabled the Hôpital général to recover some of the expenses incurred. The Discipline later housed a number of “asocial, insane, or slothful persons and difficult children.” However, the number of beggars there gradually diminished (early eighteenth century) as society began to treat them less harshly. During the eighteenth century, the Hôpital général adopted a very modern attitude to its poor charges, essentially granting them financial assistance (40% of the institution's expenses) and thus providing them with help “at home.” The institution itself controlled the stream of beggars in the city, devoting 2% of its annual budget to pay for “beggar hunters” to “rid” the city of paupers born elsewhere.

During this period, any assistance received was rarely paid back. Outside municipalities and communities saw to providing funds for their own native sons and daughters who had fallen on hard times, generally being informed that if they failed to comply, they would have to take in their poor themselves! Under the ancien régime, persons receiving assistance were deprived of their political rights (about 10% of the electorate) and would march once a year in the streets to show their gratitude for the aid they were provided.

Finally, all Genevans were not equal in terms of public assistance at the time. The rich bourgeois who had met with financial ruin was awarded greater aid since it was felt that such a man had lost more and thus was suffering more than a pauper who had become completely destitute.

=== The Restoration (1815-1830) and the Federal State ===
Until 1682, the Hôpital général took care of Genevan bourgeois and citizens of lesser standing. Starting that same year, however, the right was extending to all native-born Genevans and their descendants, as well as soldiers who were wounded in the service of the Republic. Following France's annexation of Geneva in 1798, a charity society was founded to manage the Hôpital général's assets under pressure from Genevans of longstanding who feared seeing the institution's resources dispersed. Services were limited to Genevans, a bias that would hold until the mid-twentieth century.

The Constitution of 1847 by the fervent radical James Fazy proclaimed for the first time that “the distribution of charity is a branch of government services.” Recipients of public welfare saw their political rights reinstated and suddenly swelled the ranks of the electorate. Gradually a system of legal charity replaced that of Christian charity. The Hospice général was founded by the constitutional law of 27 September 1868. Henceforth, all Genevans regardless of their place in society would be considered equal in terms of social benefits.

In 1901 a law addressed medical public assistance, regulating the situation of destitute patients and leaving the Hospice général in charge of state aid “to paupers, the old, orphans and invalids”; the law put an end to the confusion surrounding the medical and social functions that had characterized the old institution since its founding.

In 1981 a new Genevan law on social services entered into force, laying out the principles and organization of such assistance—henceforth broadened to include non-Genevans—and making clear where and how the Hospice général was to act. The law has been amended many times to adapt the services provided by the institution to the changing social and economic context.

Since 2005, state aid no longer has to be reimbursed.

=== Funding ===
From the outset the Hôpital général enjoyed a variety of financial sources. Funds came first of all from the ancient possessions of a number of small medieval hospitals and the ecclesiastical tithes levied on surrounding lands. Later the institution was left numerous properties both inside and outside the city walls to ensure its autonomy and ability to carry out its mission. The Hôpital général quickly became a large property owner in fact, even possessing lands for farming and wine growing in several areas (Plainpalais, La Cluse, Malagnou and Bossey, at the foot of Mount Salève) that went to furnish the Hôpital's own tables in Bourg-de-Four. Hectares of forested land also guaranteed a steady supply of wood for heating.

The Hôpital général was also granted the revenues from residency and bourgeoisie (full citizenship) fees paid by beneficiaries of those rights, as well as the taxes levied on entertainments, mainly street shows (the so-called paupers’ tax).

Donations, bequests and monies from collection boxes represented a good third of the institution's revenues.

The monopoly that the Hôpital général held over the rental of “mourning coats” and other funeral objects generated significant revenues and constituted an additional privilege granted to the institution. Perhaps more surprising are the lotteries that were organized in the eighteenth century through a company founded for the occasion; the lotteries took place several times a year. Far from being a paltry source of funds, they sold upwards of 15,000 tickets for a sum total of three hundred thousand Genevan pounds.

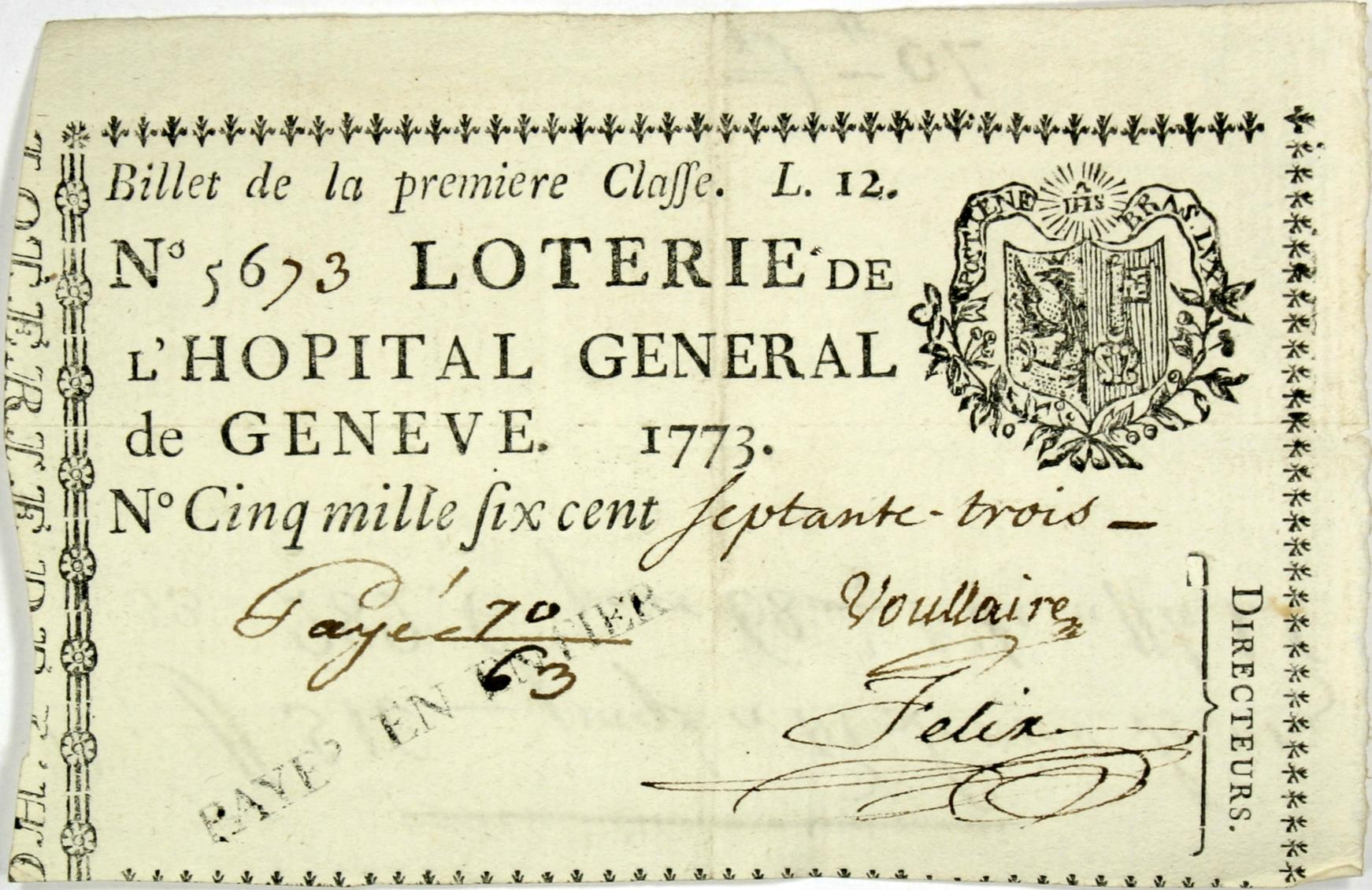
An eighteenth-century lottery ticket

All kinds of financial investments were also largely used during the period from the Reformation to the late nineteenth century. Often these involved life annuities contracted with wealthy widows. According to the records, however, these investments often turned out to be unprofitable. And although the Hôpital général was already a landholder with numerous properties to its name, the government granted it the rights to the pasture fees for the vast glacis surrounding the city. Thus, the Hôpital général leased the glacis of Rive and Neuve, for instance, to a butcher to graze his sheep there. The same type of arrangement held for the fortifications of Saint-Gervais and their glacis.

=== The Icehouses ===
For a century and a half, the Hôpital général enjoyed another surprising benefit, namely a monopoly on the sale of ice. The ice trade involved man-made pits in the shape of inverted truncated cones that could contain between two hundred and three hundred tons of ice each. They were covered with thatch that had to be regularly replaced. The pits were filled during the winter and would last for the entire summer, providing a little relief during the hottest days. Ice was not, however, within everyone's means; the service entailed significant maintenance costs. Nevertheless, the glacières (icehouses) constituted an important contribution to the Hôpital général's finances.

=== Changes in Funding Sources ===
Funding for the Hôpital général (later the Hospice général) has of course greatly changed over its history, as have the proportions represented by its various sources. Its real-estate holdings, for instance, represented barely 3% of its income under the ancien régime, then played a major role after the Constitution of 1847, reaching 52% of its revenue in 1900, before falling back to 8% today.

== The Hospice général's Missions ==
=== New Responsibilities ===
In 1981 the State of Geneva put the Hospice général at the center of its social services by making it the only organization to oversee public assistance. This decision has occasioned profound internal changes and extraordinary changes of scale and scope in the past three decades.

The department responsible for social services, for example, would go from thirty-six staff members in 1981 to 553 employees in 2011 (the institution's total number of staff has reached 1040 employees). The budget grew from twelve million to 343 million Swiss francs in 2011, and is now covered in large part by a subsidy of 300 million Swiss francs allocated by the canton.

The institution's various missions have also changed considerably. The major increase in the demand for social services, the assistance provided to the unemployed who have come to the end of their benefits, the simplification and uniformization of the payment scale, the reorganization of the Health and Social Services Centers, the application of the law on in-home care, the restructuring of Geneva's entire asylum policy, the changes made to social legislation, or the legitimate desire on the part of the political authorities to better manage how the subsidies paid out are being used—all of this demanded that numerous reforms be implemented. In addition to that, over the last decade there has been a long series of reorganizations along with the computerization of administrative follow-up.

Radical changes also occurred in terms of management. “It is [from now on] a dynamic institution in which the notions of administration, management, procedures, master plans, institutional projects or performance mandates are part of the staff’s daily reality even if the same central concern remains: to continue to serve the neediest".^{1}

During the popular vote of 14 October 2012, the people of Geneva adopted a new constitution that notably confirms the role played by the Hospice général.

=== Missions ===
The Hospice général's activities are part of an overall cantonal and federal social services structure whose aims are to preserve social cohesion and help beneficiaries live independently once again. The institution's main missions are:

- Social support and financial assistance for individuals and families who are without sufficient resources;
- Welcome and assistance, including financial help, for asylum seekers, along with providing living accommodations;
- Assistance and housing for troubled young adults;
- Management of leisure centers and holiday homes for the elderly;
- Prevention of and information about social ills for all categories of the population.

=== Strategy 2016-2020: Inventing the Hospice général of tomorrow ===
Facing an ever-growing number of beneficiaries, though with no additional resources at its disposal, the Hospice général has committed itself to an ambitious reform initiative to simplify and facilitate its administrative framework, so as to free up more time and resources for social support, strictly speaking. This strategy, called Inventing the Hospice général of tomorrow, draws upon the staff's own areas of expertise and acquired knowledge. They have been asked to question current practices, implement and, where possible, improve upon new approaches inspired by the innovative concepts of Design Thinking and Service Design, and put the results repeatedly to the test.

Implementation of this reform shares in the following overall view: the Hospice général is the Genevan institution dedicated to fostering better living together. It carries out its mission so that everyone has a place in the Genevan community and is free to contribute to society.

=== Organization ===
Social Support offers social and financial assistance to persons who are facing difficult circumstances, or who lack the necessary means for taking care of their vital or personal needs, as well as individuals who have exhausted their unemployment benefits. Social Support also runs a service, Point jeunes, that specializes in providing housing and support to young adults between the ages of 18 and 25.

Assistance to Immigrants manages on behalf of the Swiss Confederation financial assistance that is provided to asylum seekers and persons granted provisional admission who have been assigned to the Canton of Geneva. This service also offers initiatives for integrating these individuals who are new to Swiss society, with the aim of making them fully independent members of the community. The service furnishes urgent aid to persons who have been found nonsuited (non-entrée en matière, NEM) or have been denied refugee status, as well as foreigners without papers (étrangers sans permis, ETSP).

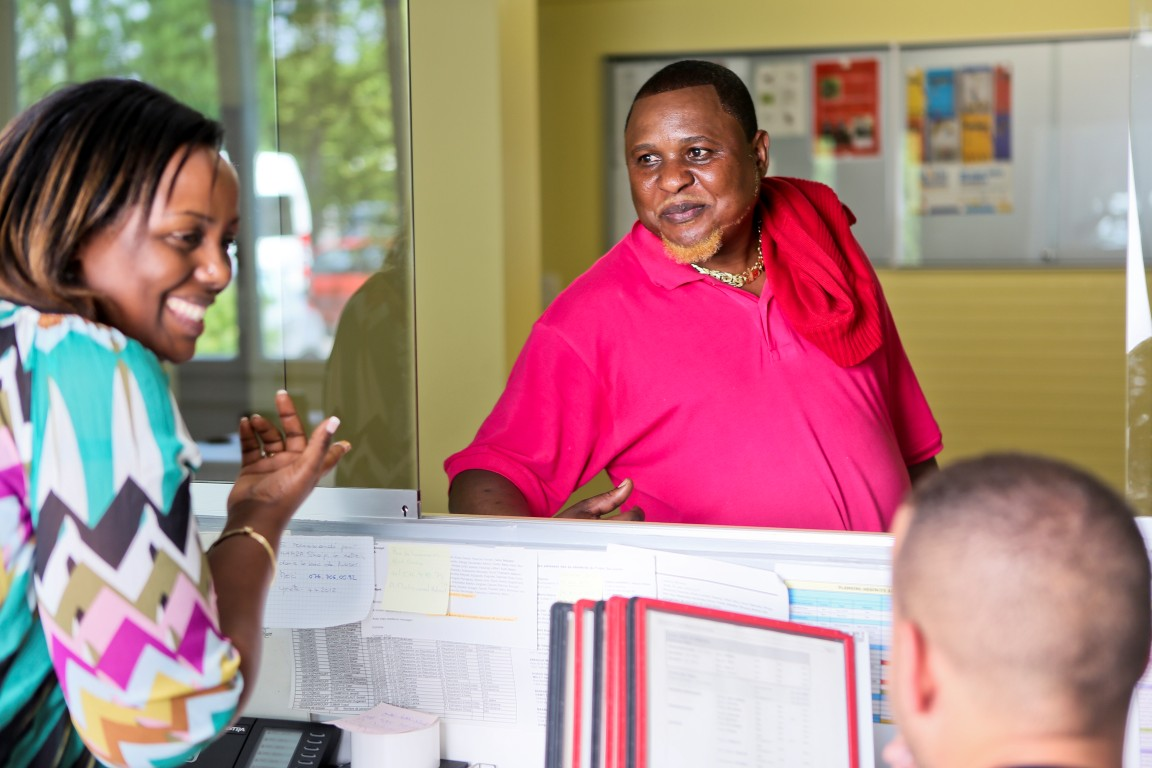
The reception at an asylum seekers’ hostel run by the Hospice général

Activities for Seniors include the Day Care Center for Retirees (Centre d’animation pour retraités, CAD), as well as two holiday homes, Chalet Florimont and Nouvelle-Roseraie.

The Financial Department draws up the budget, designs and implements managerial tools needed to run the institution (accounting charts, activities charts, indicators, etc.), and provides continuous oversight of the institution's activities and their compliance with budget estimates.

The mission of Human Resources is to develop the staff members’ abilities and strengthen their motivation, play an active role in building the organization and optimizing its services, and define and ensure the implementation of best institutional practices for managing human resources in conformance with the established guidelines.

The Central Services include the Information Systems Department, the Law Department, the Investigation Department and the Studies and Statistics Department. These departments are horizontally integrated, working across departmental lines. They provide services to the whole of the institution.

The Directorate General includes the following: the Real Estate Department and Communications Department, the latter ensuring that needed information both circulates within the Hospice général and reaches the public outside the institution.

== Social Initiatives ==
The Hospice général provides its services to all the residents of the Canton of Geneva facing financial difficulties, whether temporary or long term. The Hospice makes its social and financial services available to adults between the ages of eighteen and sixty-five; senior citizens are covered by complementary assistance that the Hospice général can oversee, if need be. Whatever the age of the individuals facing difficulties, the Hospice général is committed to helping them regain their independence.

Several programs exist to foster beneficiaries’ return to independence, including:

- the Contract for Individual Social Assistance (Contrat d’aide sociale individual, CASI), which is used to define a reintegration project;
- unpaid part-time posts in not-for-profit organizations. The proposed temporary work experiences considerably reduce the time needed to return to paid employment while furnishing references for the beneficiaries’ curriculum vitae.

The main difficulties facing individuals benefiting from help in this area are linked to employment, housing, administrative management, debt and health problems.

The institution supplements individual assistance with specific programs such as its workshops on creating and keeping a budget, or repaying medical costs, along with services designed for specific age groups such as Point jeunes, which targets eighteen- to twenty-five-year-olds.

=== CASI a Tool for Individual Empowerment ===
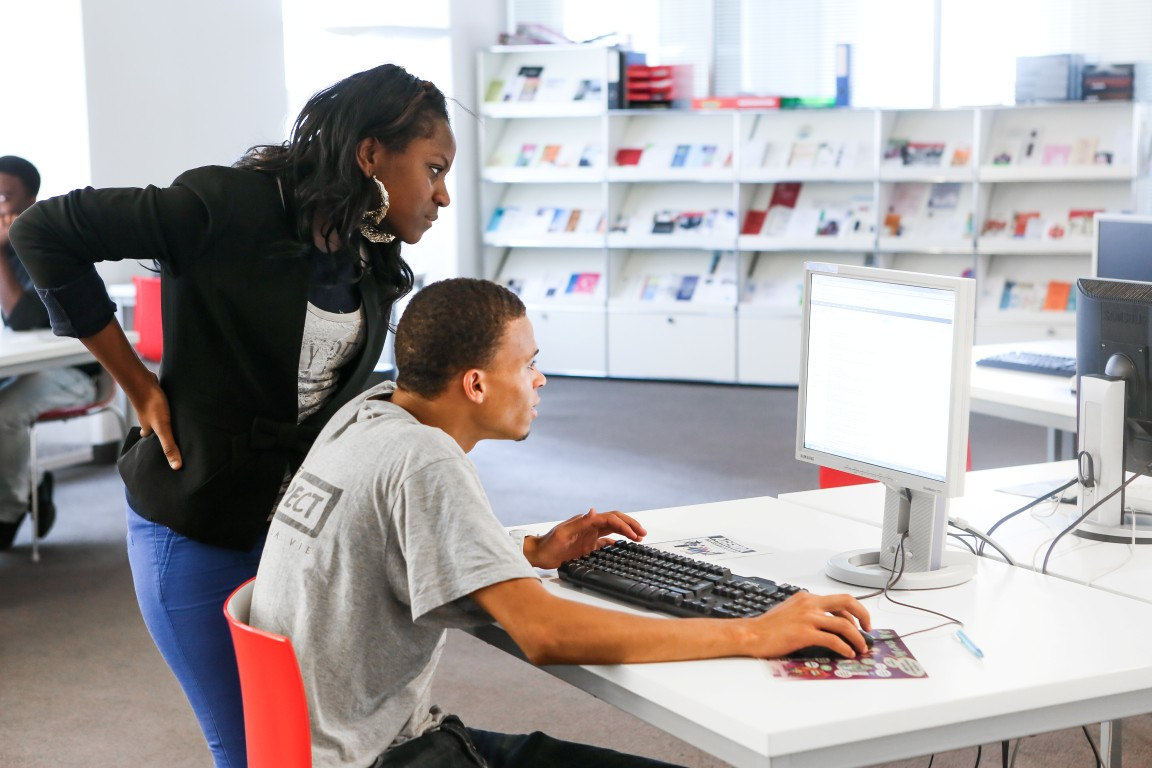

Among the tools available to the Hospice général's staff, there is one that is emblematic of the institution's philosophy, the Contract for Individual Social Assistance (CASI). Each person who receives financial assistance must fill out with his or her case worker a CASI, which defines the personal and professional objectives that are to be achieved in order to regain his or her independence. This document is of fundamental importance, making it possible to lend greater visibility to the work that is in fact accomplished while providing the user with a chance to embrace his or her project more fully.

== Assistance to Immigrants ==
Since the sixteenth century Geneva has been a haven for victims of persecution, civil wars and other catastrophes. This has generated a fluctuating, unknown population whose faces and stories have changed with the upheavals affecting our world.

As mandated by the Swiss Confederation, the Canton of Geneva must accommodate 5.6% of those entering Swiss territory who are seeking asylum. Today the Hospice général's Assistance to Immigrants is entirely responsible for the Canton of Geneva's commitment, taking charge of each asylum seeker with dignity and respect. At a point where many languages and cultures meet, Assistance to Immigrants rises to the challenge of integrating an extremely diverse population, introducing these individuals to the practices, language and organization of the canton.

The Hospice général's professional staff assist immigrants and provide them with continuing support in their effort to achieve social and financial independence. The Hospice général offers specialized training programs and classes that are useful to someone returning to Switzerland or a foreign-born person settling there. Nonsuited asylum seekers are provided with emergency assistance while awaiting their departure.

== Activities for Seniors ==
=== The Day Care Center for Retirees ===
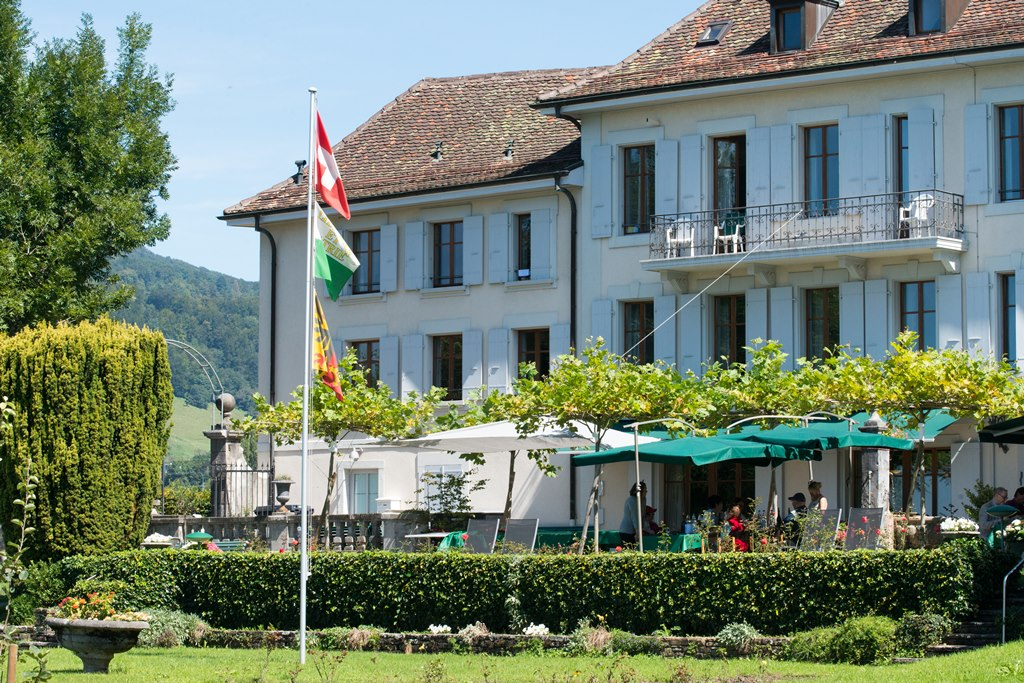
La Nouvelle Roseraie

For centuries the Hospice général helped elderly persons who were without the support of a family to live out the end of their days with dignity. Today, because the social security retirement system and other complementary services guarantees relative financial independence for the elderly, the Hospice général is deeply committed to maintaining seniors’ social connections through its Day Care Center for Retirees (Centre d’animation pour retraités, CAD). CAD is involved with the different municipalities, mainly as part of the network of associations offering activities designed for seniors. It plays a role as a facilitator, providing advice on how to diversify such activities, etc.

=== La Nouvelle Roseraie ===
La Nouvelle Roseraie is available to seniors to engage in outdoor activities, such as enjoying a change of scenery, or relaxing in quality accommodations.

== The Hospice général's Governing Body ==
The Hospice général is an independent establishment that is strictly supervised by the State of Geneva and has legal personality.

=== The Board of Directors ===
A 17 March 2006 law on the Hospice général lays out its status, mission, and organization. The institution comes under the direct responsibility of a board of directors representing the canton's various political forces. The current board has as its president Anne Héritier Lachat; the representatives named by the Greater Council are François Ambrosio (MCG), Fabienne Bugnon (Ve), Hélène Gache (PDC), Michael Andersen (UDC), Blaise Geiger (PLR), Thomas Vachetta (EAG), Lydia Schneider Hausser (S); the representatives named by the Council of State are Fabienne Fischer, Béatrice Grange et Selim Arcan; the representative named by the municipalities is Alain Corthay; the staff's representative is Luc Schildermans; the representative of the Department of Social Cohesion (in an advisory capacity) is Nadine Mudry.

=== Management ===
Christophe Girod, Chief Executive; Renée Zellweger Monin, General Secretary; Yasmine Praz Dessimoz, Director of Social Services; Ariane Daniel Merkelbach, Director of Assistance to Immigrants; Anaïs Stauffer Spuhler, Director of Human Resources; Othmar Kobler, Director of Finances; Roland Vezza, Head of Information Systems; Laurence Friederich, Director of the Real Estate; and Anne Nouspikel, Head of Communications.

== See also ==
=== Bibliography ===
- Une autre Genève, ed. Yves Bieri, Henri Roth and Véronique Zbinden, Geneva: Slatkine, 2009
- Sauver l'âme, nourrir le corps, Bernard Lescaze, Geneva: Hospice général, 1985

=== Appendices ===
- * 1. La Charte institutionnelle
- * 2. Projet institutionnel
