= Jean de La Forêt =

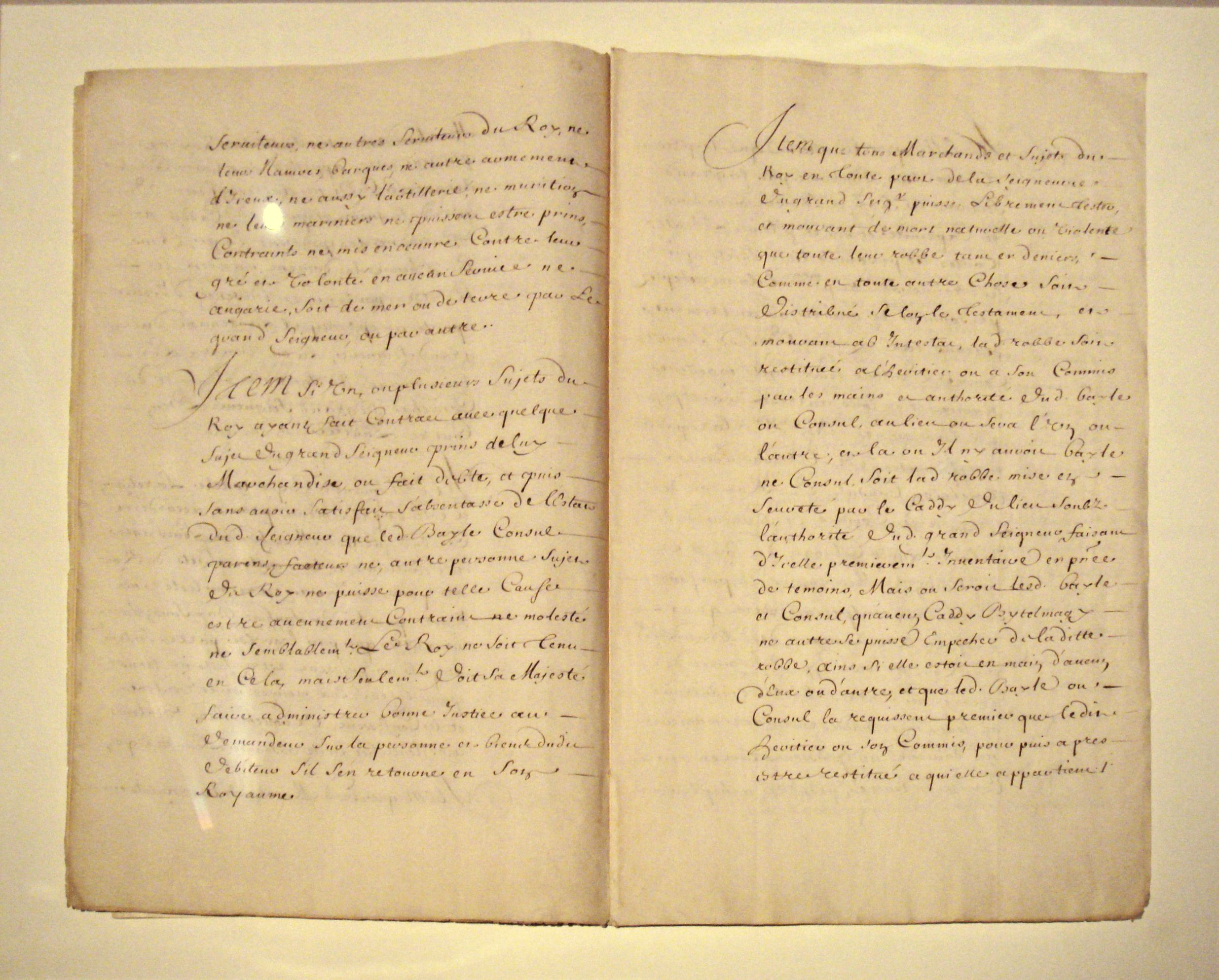
Draft of the 1536 Treaty negotiated between Jean de La Forêt and Ibrahim Pasha, a few days before his assassination, expanding to the whole Ottoman Empire the privileges received in Egypt from the Mamluks before 1518.

Jean de La Forêt, also Jean de La Forest or Jehan de la Forest (died 1537), was the first official French Ambassador to the Ottoman Empire, serving from 1534 to 1537. Antonio Rincon had preceded him as an envoy to the Ottoman Empire from 1530 to 1533. When Jean de La Forêt died in Constantinople in 1537, he was succeeded by Antonio Rincon as official ambassador.

== 1534 embassy to the Ottoman Empire ==
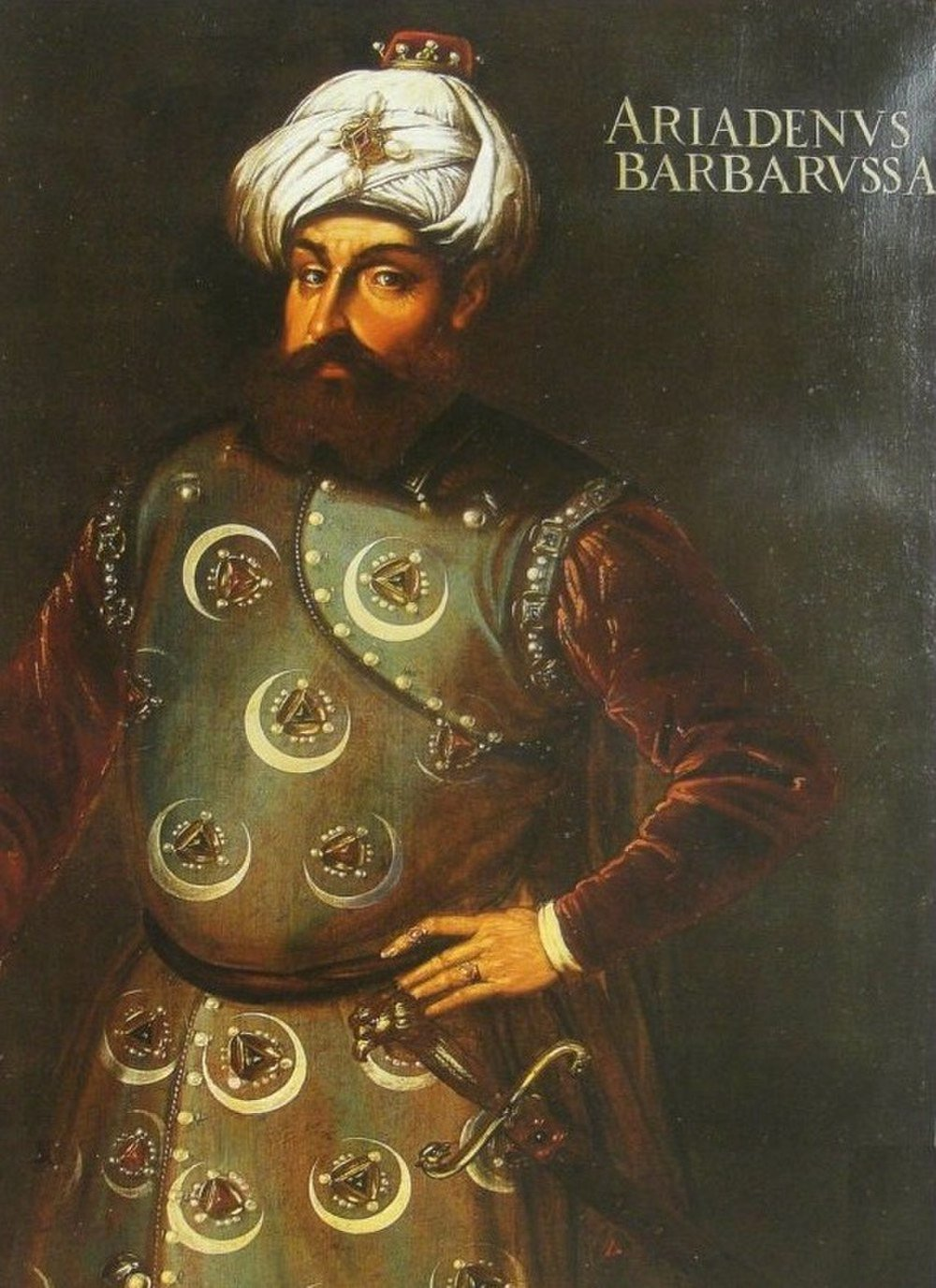
Jean de La Forêt negotiated with Hayreddin Barbarossa in 1534.

Jean de La Forêt departed together with the returning Ottoman embassy to France. On his way to Constantinople, Jean de La Forêt first landed in north Africa, where he offered Hayreddin Barbarossa fifty ships and supplies in exchange for help against Genoa. He also asked Hayreddin to raid the coasts of Spain "with all manner of war".

Jean de La Forêt arrived in the Ottoman capital in May 1534, accompanied by his cousin Charles de Marillac and the scholar Guillaume Postel, and endeavored to exert French influence on Ottoman affairs. He accompanied Suleiman to Azerbaijan in the Ottoman–Safavid War against Persia, until they finally returned together to Constantinople in early 1536.

Jean de La Forêt was directed to seek trading privileges, as well as religious arrangements and military agreements between France and the Ottoman Empire. De La Forêt had also been instructed by Francis I to obtain "a million of gold, which will be no inconvenience to the Grand Signior". In exchange, Francis I proposed in his instructions to La Forêt: an ambassador, a perpetual treaty of alliance, trade and a promise "to hold all Christianity quiet, without war undertaken against him... in a universal peace", by weakening Charles V "until he can no more resist".

Jean de la Foret also had secret military instructions to organize a combined offensive on Italy in 1535:

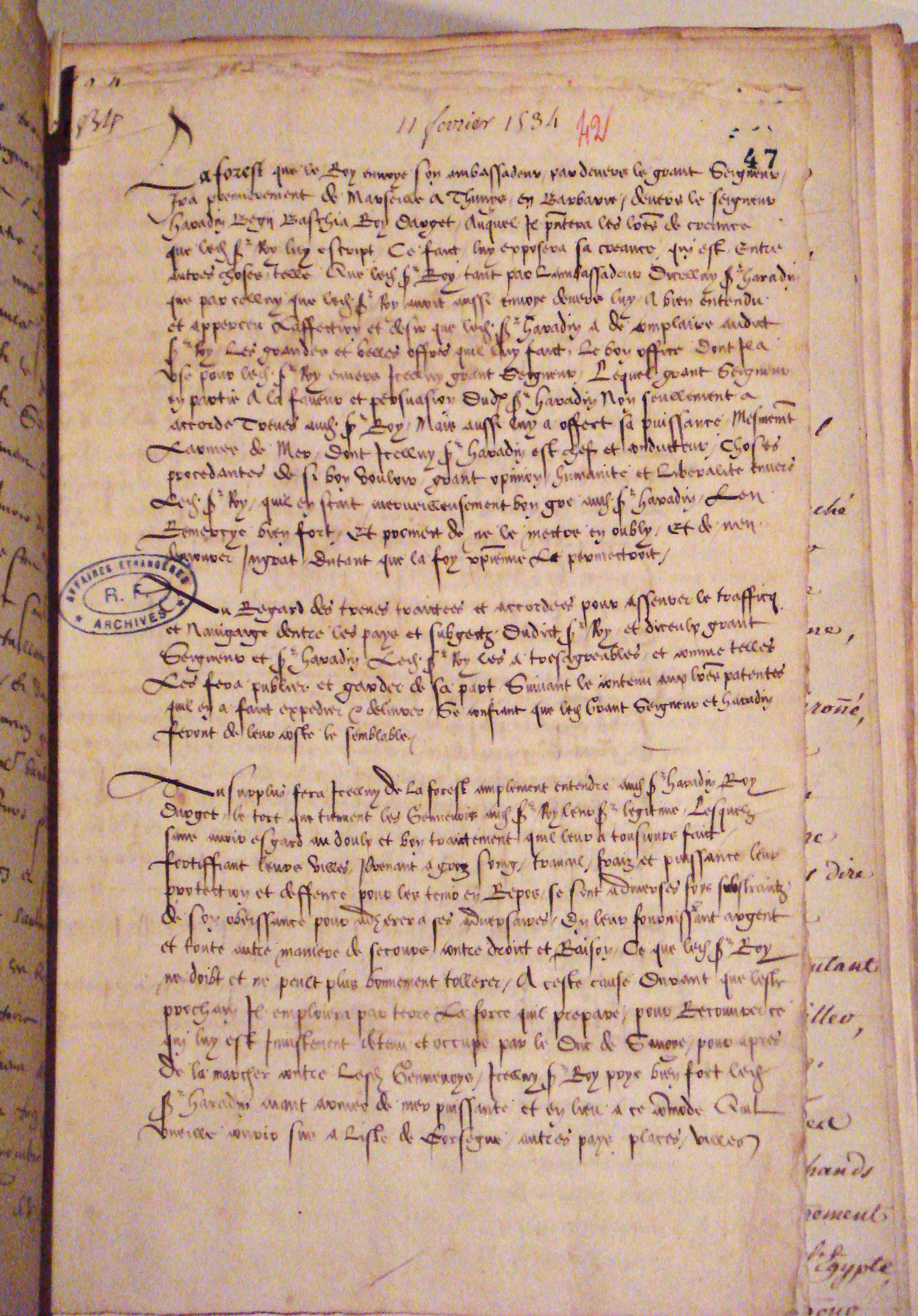
Military instructions to Jean de la Forêt, by Chancellor Antoine Duprat (copy), 11 February 1535.

"Jean de la Forest, whom the King sends to meet with the Grand Signor [Suleiman the Magnificent], will first go from Marseille to Tunis, in Barbary, to meet sir Haradin, king of Algiers, who will direct him to the Grand Signor. To this objective, next summer, he [the King of France] with send the military force he is preparing to recover what it unjustly occupied by the Duke of Savoy, and from there, to attack the Genoese. This king Francis I strongly prays sir Haradin, who has a powerful naval force as well as a convenient location [Tunisia], to attack the island of Corsica and other lands, locations, cities, ships and subjects of Genoa, and not to stop until they have accepted and recognized the king of France. The King, besides the above land force, will additionally help with his naval force, which will comprise at least 50 vessels, of which 30 galleys, and the rest galeasses and other vessels, accompanied by one of the largest and most beautiful carracks that ever was on the sea. This fleet will accompany and escort the army of sir Haradin, which will also be refreshed and supplied with food and ammunition by the King, who, by these actions, will be able to achieve his aims, for which he will be highly grateful to sir Haradin.[...]
To the Grand Signor, Monsieur de La Forest must ask for a million in gold, and for his army to enter first in Sicily and Sardinia and establish there a king whom La Forest will nominate, a person who has credit and knows well these islands which he will retain in the devotion of, and under the shade and support of the King [of France]. Furthermore, he will recognize this blessing, and send tribute and pension to the Grand Signor to reward him for the financial support he will have provided to the King, as well as the support of his navy which will be fully assisted by the King [of France]."

— Military instruction from Francis I to Jean de La Forest, 1535.

Through the negotiations of de La Forêt with the vizir Ibrahim Pasha it was agreed that combined military operations against Italy would take place, in which France would attack Lombardy while the Ottoman Empire would attack from Naples.

=== 1536 Franco-Turkish treaty ===
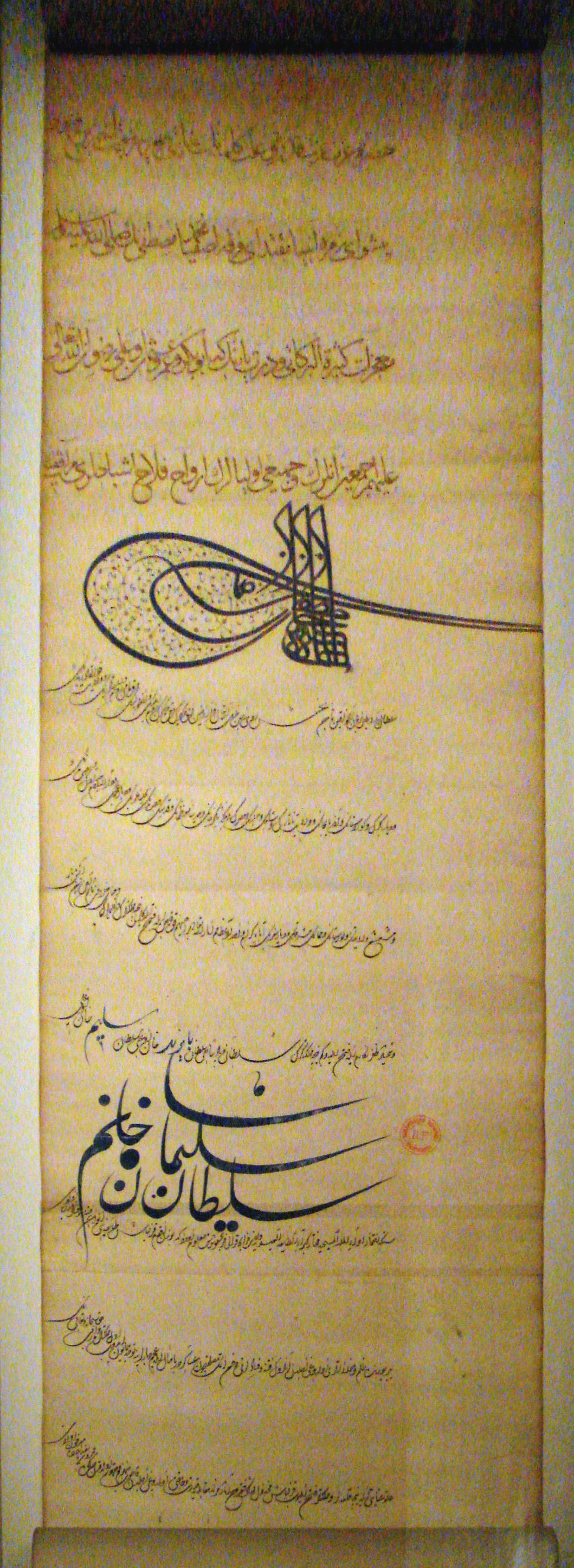
Letter of Suleiman to Francis I in 1536, informing Francis I of the successful campaign of Iraq, and acknowledging the permanent French embassy of Jean de La Forest at the Ottoman court

In February 1536, de la Forêt obtained the signature of a commercial treaty called Capitulations (of which only a draft has been recovered), which was the foundation for French influence in the Ottoman Empire and the Levant until the 19th century. Suleiman seemingly had some doubts about French commitment, expressing: "How can I have trust in him? He has always promised more than he can carry out", referring to the lack of French commitment in 1534–35, when Tunis was finally recaptured by Charles V, but he nevertheless agreed to the alliance upon Francis I's invasion of Piedmont in early 1536.

The 1536 Franco-Turkish treaty allowed the French in the Ottoman Empire to be judged by their own laws, in a French Consular court (a status the Venetians had already been granted), exemption from the usual taxes and dues levied upon non-Muslim foreigners, and trading concessions. This treaty offered guaranties (especially extraterritoriality) that would become the model for future "unequal treaties" between European and Asian powers. By this agreement, French law courts, churches and valuables would all remain extraterritorial in the Ottoman Empire. In a sense, French possessions in the Ottoman Empire would become the first foreign possessions of the French Crown, effectively a Crown Colony of France. The French protectorate also extended to the Holy Places of Jerusalem. By 1620, one third of France's foreign trade was done with the Ottoman Empire.

The commercial treaty actually was something of a façade for Jean de La Forêt, whose main role was actually to coordinate military collaboration between France and the Ottoman Empire. The commercial treaty however would become prominent from the second half of the 16th century.

Once the treaty with the Turks was secured, Francis I invaded Savoy in 1536, starting the Italian War of 1536–1538. A Franco-Turkish fleet was stationed in Marseille by the end of 1536, threatening Genoa. In 1537 Hayreddin Barbarossa raided the Italian coast and laid siege to Corfu, although this provided only limited assistance to the French. With Charles V unsuccessful in battle and squeezed between the French invaders and the Ottomans, Francis I and Charles V ultimately made peace at the Truce of Nice, 18 June 1538. La Forêt died at Constantinople in the following year. Charles V would turn his efforts against the Ottomans, only to lose the Battle of Preveza on 28 September 1538.

The vizier died soon after the treaty was made in 1536, and there is doubt whether the treaty was formally ratified at this point, since only an archived draft has been found. The treaty of alliance between France and the Ottoman Empire would eventually be ratified later in 1569 through ambassador Claude du Bourg. Suleiman nevertheless respected the content of the agreement, and launched his armies, awaiting for the French offensive.

=== Scientific mission ===
Jean de La Forêt was accompanied on his embassy by the French linguist and writer Guillaume Postel, who led the scientific research of the mission, and made an extremely positive account of the Ottoman civilization and its educational, judicial and welfare systems in his De Orbis terrae concordia libri quattuor.

== See also ==
- Franco-Ottoman alliance
- France-Asia relations

== Sources ==
- Frazee, Charles A. (2006) [1983]. Catholics and Sultans: The Church and the Ottoman Empire 1453-1923. Cambridge: Cambridge University Press.
- Garnier, Edith L'Alliance Impie Editions du Felin, 2008, Paris ISBN 978-2-86645-678-8 Interview

Diplomatic posts
Preceded by Antonio Rincon (as envoy)	French Ambassador to the Ottoman Empire; 1534–1537	Succeeded by Antonio Rincon
