= Antonio Rincon =

Spanish-born diplomat in the service of France (died 1541)

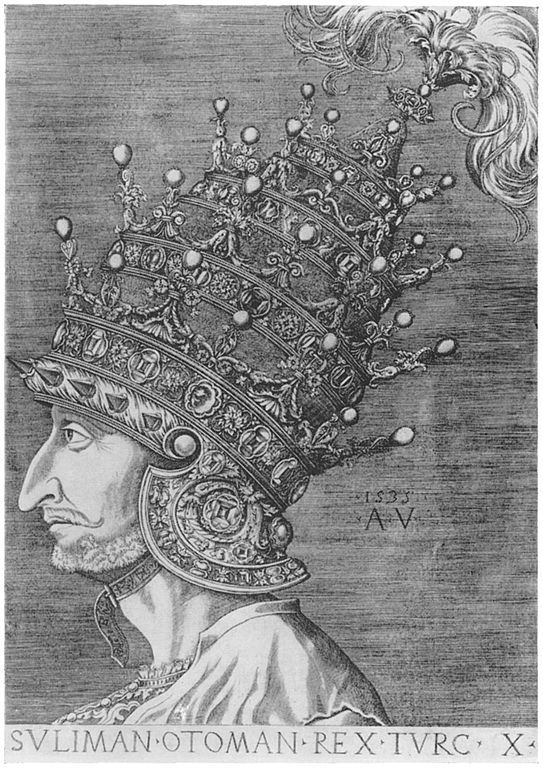
In 1532, the French ambassador Antonio Rincon presented Suleiman the Magnificent with this tiara or helmet, made in Venice for 115,000 ducats.

Antonio Rincon (died 3/4 July 1541), also Antoine de Rincon, was a Spanish-born diplomat in the service of France. An influential envoy from the King of France to Sultan Suleiman I of the Ottoman Empire, he made various missions to Constantinople between 1530 and 1541. While an effective diplomat, Rincon's enemies considered him a renegade and some later observers would criticize him for promoting Machiavellian policies.

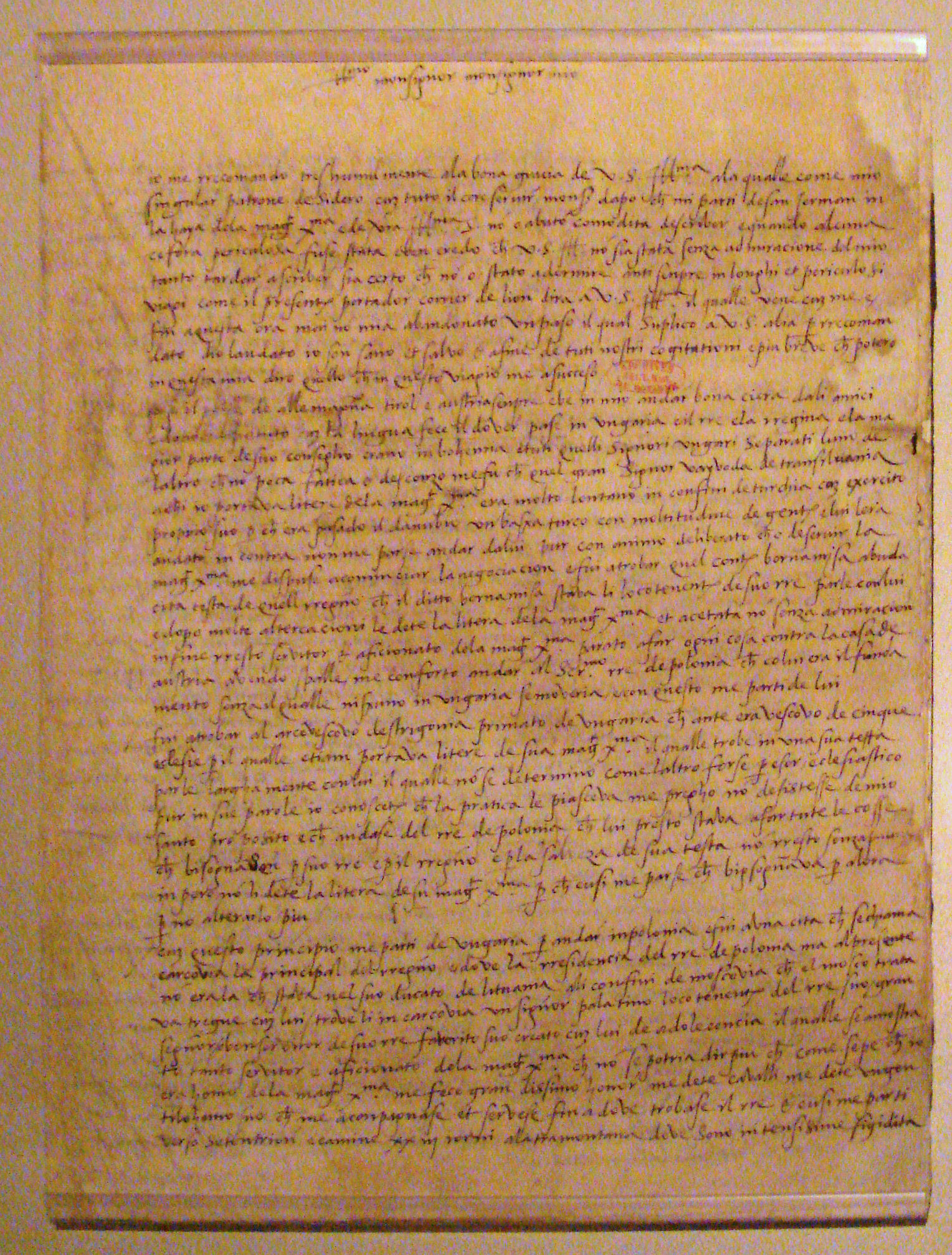
Letter of Antonio Rincon to Admiral de Bonnivet, reporting on his missions in Hungary and Poland, 4 April 1523.

Antonio Rincon was employed by France on several missions to Poland and Hungary between 1522 and 1525. At that time, following the 1522 Battle of Bicoque, Francis I was attempting to ally with king Sigismund I the Old of Poland. As Sigismund was not forthcoming, Francis I instead chose to support Janos Zapolya in Hungary. A Franco-Hungarian alliance would be concluded in 1528 through a treaty.

Antonio Rincon was sent by King Francis I of France to the Ottoman court in July 1530 seemingly to negotiate a military agreement against Emperor Charles V. He also attempted to negotiate an Ottoman loan to the French crown, but was denied it on the ground that a Muslim could not lend money to Christians.

Rincon was again sent to the Ottoman court in March 1532. He told one of his friends (count Guido Rangone, a Modenese soldier whose expertise as a military engineer had been demonstrated in the remodelling of the defenses at Pinerolo) that the king of France had given him various secret commissions, none of which he could reveal, as he had been expressly commanded by the king not to say a word about them "either to the Grand Master or to the Admiral of France, both of whom were opposed to his warlike plans... " In fact, he was to try to obtain an Ottoman offensive against Italy, rather than the offensive against Hungary that the Ottomans were planning. After an illness, he arrived too late to change their plans.

Jean de La Forêt became the first official French ambassador to the Ottoman court in 1534. Rincon in turn became an official French Ambassador to the Ottoman court from 1538 to 1541.

In January 1541 Rincon and his party arrived from Constantinople at Venice, ill and weary from stormy travel. There he met Lorenzo Gritti, a surviving son of the Venetian doge (his adventurous brother Lodovico Gritti was dead), and a Genoan named Cesare Fregoso. In their company, he made the hazardous journey that "in those times of jealousy and division" separated Venice from Paris. He and Fregoso were killed in July at Rivoli on their way back to Constantinople. Imperial forces were apparently responsible for the assassination, which violated established standards of diplomatic immunity. The event triggered, or was a pretext for, the Italian War of 1542–1546 between Francis I and Charles V.

Diplomatic posts
| Preceded by Jean de La Forêt | French Ambassador to the Ottoman Empire; 1538–1541 | Succeeded by Antoine Escalin des Aimars |

== See also ==
- Franco-Ottoman alliance
