= Capture of Peñón of Algiers (1529) =

1529 battle

Capture of Algiers
- Part of Spanish–Ottoman wars
- Penon island
Date	7–29 May 1529
Location	Algiers
Result	Algerian victory

Belligerents
Spanish Empire	Regency of Algiers

Commanders and leaders
(Spain) Don Martin de Vargas (executed)	Hayreddin Barbarossa

Strength
Garrison: • 200 soldiers Relief army: • 9 ships	2,000 janissaries; Contingent of Kabyles

Casualties and losses
Garrison: • 175 dead, 25 captured Relief army: • 9 ships captured	Unknown

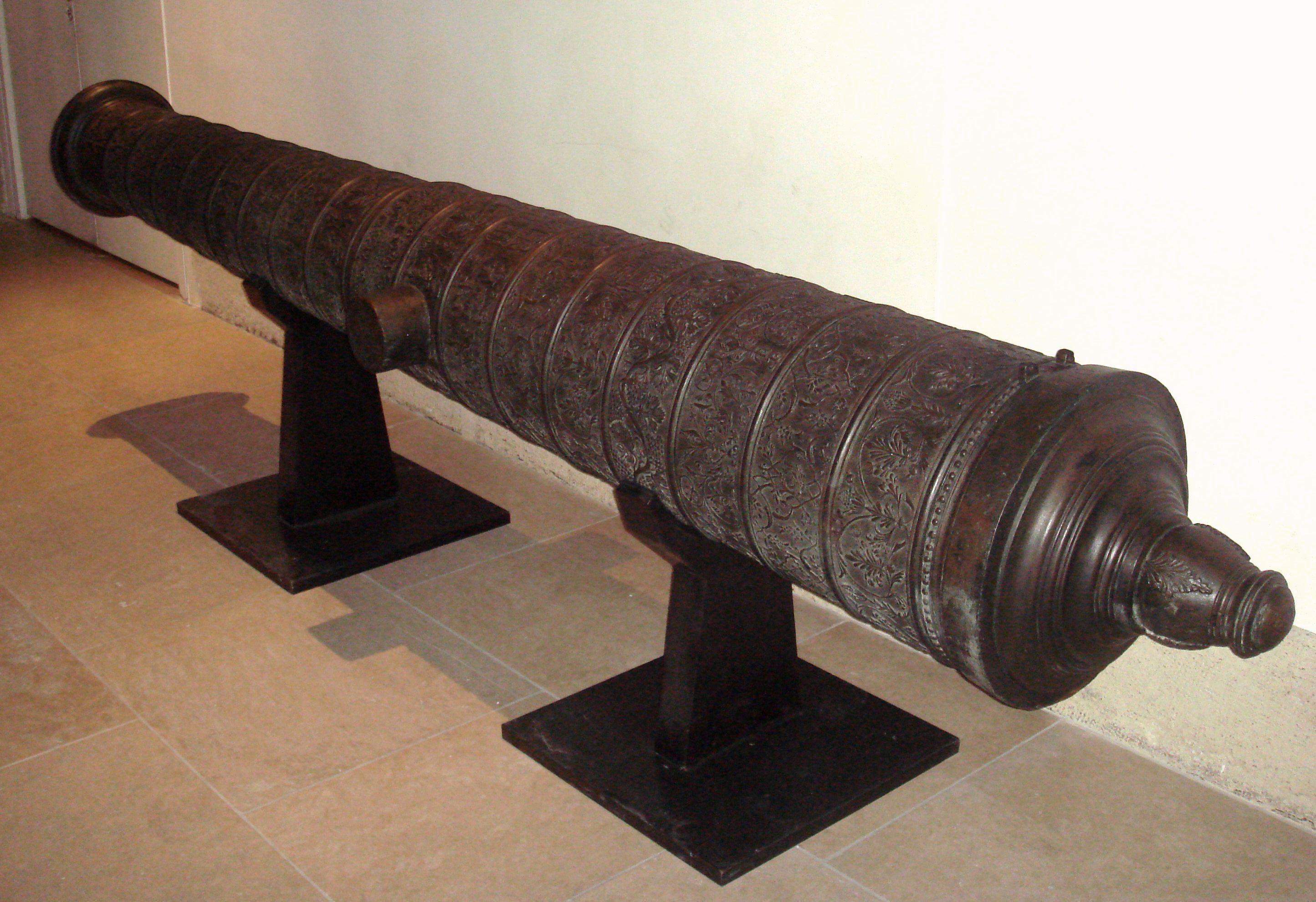
Ornate Ottoman cannon cast 8 October 1581 in Algiers. Length: 385 cm, cal:178mm, weight: 2910kg, stone projectile. Musée de l'Armée, Paris.

The capture of Peñón of Algiers was accomplished when the beylerbey of Algiers, Hayreddin Barbarossa, captured the fortress called Peñón of Algiers, on a small islet facing the Algerian city of Algiers from the Habsburg Spaniards.

== Background ==
In 1510, the Spaniards had established themselves on a small island off Algiers, and forced the local ruler Sālim al-Tūmī (Selim-bin-Teumi) to accept their presence through a treaty and pay tribute. Fortifications were built on the islet, and a garrison of 200 men was established. Sālim al-Tūmī had to go to Spain to take an oath of obedience to Ferdinand of Aragon.

In 1516 however, the amir of Algiers Sālim al-Tūmī invited the corsair brothers Aruj and Khair ad-Din Barbarossa to expel the Spaniards. Aruj, with the help of Ottoman troops, came to Algiers, ordered the assassination of Sālim because Sālim was conspiring with the Spaniards against the pirates and Aruj, and seized the town. Spanish expeditions were sent to take over the city, first in 1516 under Don Diego de Vera, and then in 1519 under Don Ugo de Moncada, but both expeditions ended in failure.

Khair ad-Din, succeeding Aruj after the latter was killed in a battle against the Spaniards at the Fall of Tlemcen (1517). The capture of Algiers in 1516 had been made possible with the support of the Ottoman Sultan Selim I. This support was discontinued with Sultan Selim's death in 1520, causing Barbarossa to lose the city to a local kabyle chieftain in 1524, and to retreat to his fief of Djidjelli.

== Reconquest ==
When Suleiman the Magnificent declared war on Emperor Ferdinand I in January 1529, he also wished to go on the offensive in the western Mediterranean, and therefore renewed Ottoman support for Barbarossa.

Barbarossa received from the Ottoman Empire 2,000 janissaries, artillery, and important financial support. Through bribery Barbarossa first obtained a change in the allegiance of the supporters of the Algierian sheikh. After taking power in the city, Barbarossa then lay siege to the El Peñón de Argel, the Spanish fortress at the entrance of the harbour. After 22 days enduring artillery fire without help from the Spanish mainland, the Spanish garrison under Don Martin de Vargas finally surrendered on 29 May 1529, with only 25 men left. Vargas was cudgelled to death, the fortress was dismantled, and the stonework used to build a seawall using Christian slaves as manpower. Nine Spanish vessels that had come to the aid of the fortress were captured.

== Aftermath ==
Over the following years, Barbarossa used Algiers as a major base for launching raids from the Barbary Coast. The huge Algiers expedition undertaken by Charles V in 1541 to retake Algiers ended in failure. Algiers remained under Ottoman rule for three centuries, until the French Invasion of Algiers in 1830.

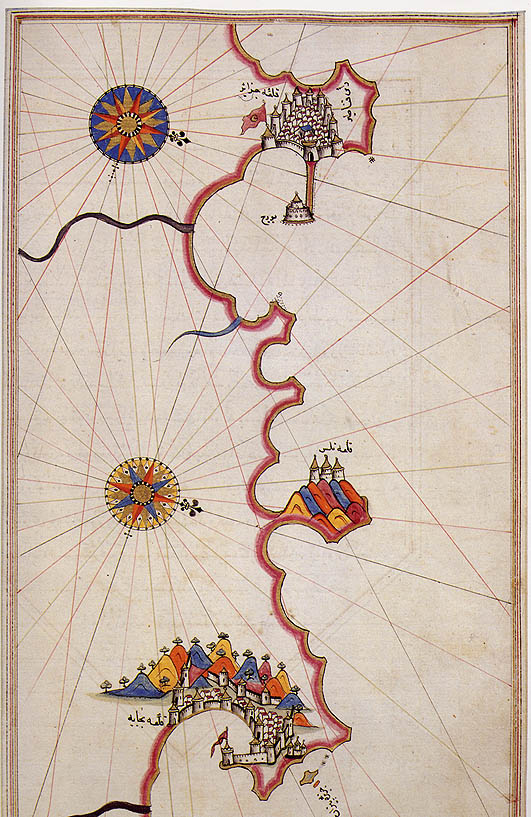
Historic map of Algiers by Piri Reis.
