= BKY =

BKY or bky can refer to:

- Babıali Kültür Yayıncılığı, a Turkish book publishing company
- Berkeley station (California), a train station in Berkeley, California, U.S., by station code
- Bokyi language, a language spoken in Cross River State, Nigeria, by ISO 639 code
- Kavumu Airport, an airport in Bukavu, Democratic Republic of the Congo, by IATA code
