= Hayreddin Barbarossa =

Ottoman corsair and admiral of the Ottoman navy (c. 1478–1546)

Hayreddin Barbarossa Sultan
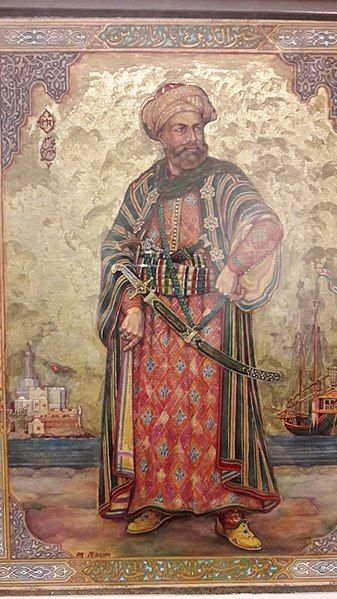
- A portrait of Hayreddin Barbarossa

Beylerbey of Algiers
- In office 1518–1545
- Preceded by: Aruj Barbarossa
- Succeeded by: Hasan Pasha

Personal details
- Born: c. 1478 Lesbos, Ottoman Empire
- Died: 4 July 1546 (aged 67–68) Büyükdere, Ottoman Empire
- Resting place: Tomb of Hayreddin Barbarossa
- Relations: Yakup Ağa (father); Katerina (mother); Ishak (brother); Oruç Reis (brother); Ilyas (brother)
- Children: Hasan Pasha
- Nickname(s): Barbarossa (Redbeard); Hayreddin; Hızır Reis

Military service
- Allegiance: Ottoman Empire: Regency of Algiers; France
- Branch/service: Ottoman Navy
- Years of service: c. 1500–1545
- Rank: Kapudan Pasha (Admiral)
- Battles/wars: Spanish-Ottoman wars; Capture of Algiers (1516); Algiers Expedition (1519); Sack of Mahón; Capture of Peñón of Algiers (1529); Campaign of Cherchell (1531); Sack of Lipari; Conquest of Tunis (1535); Ottoman-Hafsid wars; Conquest of Tunis (1534); Third Ottoman–Venetian War; Battle of Preveza; Ottoman–Venetian War (1537–1540); Siege of Castelnuovo; Italian War of 1542–1546; Siege of Nice; Sack of Ischia; Action off Elba (1504)

Hayreddin Barbarossa (Arabic: خير الدين بربروس, romanized: Khayr al-Dīn Barbarūs; Turkish: Barbaros Hayrettin Paşa), also known as Hayreddin Pasha, Hızır Hayrettin Pasha, and simply Hızır Reis (c. 1466/1483 – 4 July 1546), was an Ottoman corsair and later admiral of the Ottoman Navy. Barbarossa's naval victories secured Ottoman dominance over the Mediterranean during the mid-16th century.

Born on Lesbos, Khizr began his naval career as a corsair under his elder brother Oruç Reis. In 1516, the brothers captured Algiers from Spain, with Oruç declaring himself Sultan. Following Oruç's death in 1518, Khizr inherited his brother's nickname, "Barbarossa" ("Redbeard" in Italian). He also received the honorary name Hayreddin (from Arabic Khayr ad-Din, "goodness of the faith" or "best of the faith"). In 1529, Barbarossa took the Peñón of Algiers from the Spaniards.

In 1533, Barbarossa was appointed Kapudan Pasha (grand admiral) of the Ottoman Navy by Suleiman the Magnificent. He led an embassy to France in the same year, conquered Tunis in 1534, achieved a decisive victory over the Holy League at Preveza in 1538, and conducted joint campaigns with the French in the 1540s. Barbarossa retired to Constantinople in 1545 and died the following year.

== Background ==
Khizr was born sometime between 1466 and 1483 in Palaiokipos, Midilini, in the Ottoman Empire (now Gera, Lesbos), a son of an Ottoman sipahi father, Yakup Ağa, of Turkish or Albanian origin from Giannitsa (now in Central Macedonia, Greece), and a Greek Orthodox mother of Greek origin, Katerina, also from Lesbos, the widow of a Greek Orthodox priest. The Gazavat-ı Hayreddin Pasha, written by Seyyid Muradî from the accounts personally narrated by Barbarossa himself, explicitly identifies his father as a Turk descended from those who had migrated from Anatolia to Greece. The couple married and had two daughters and four sons: Ishak, Oruç, Khizr and Ilyas. Yakup had taken part in the Ottoman conquest of Lesbos in 1462 from the Republic of Genoa's House of Gattilusio, which held the hereditary title of Lord of Lesbos between 1355 and 1462, and as a reward was granted the fief of the village of Bonova on the island. He became an established potter and purchased a boat to trade his products with.

The four sons helped their father with his business, but not much is known about the daughters. At first Oruç helped with the boat, while Khizr helped with the pottery.

== Early career ==
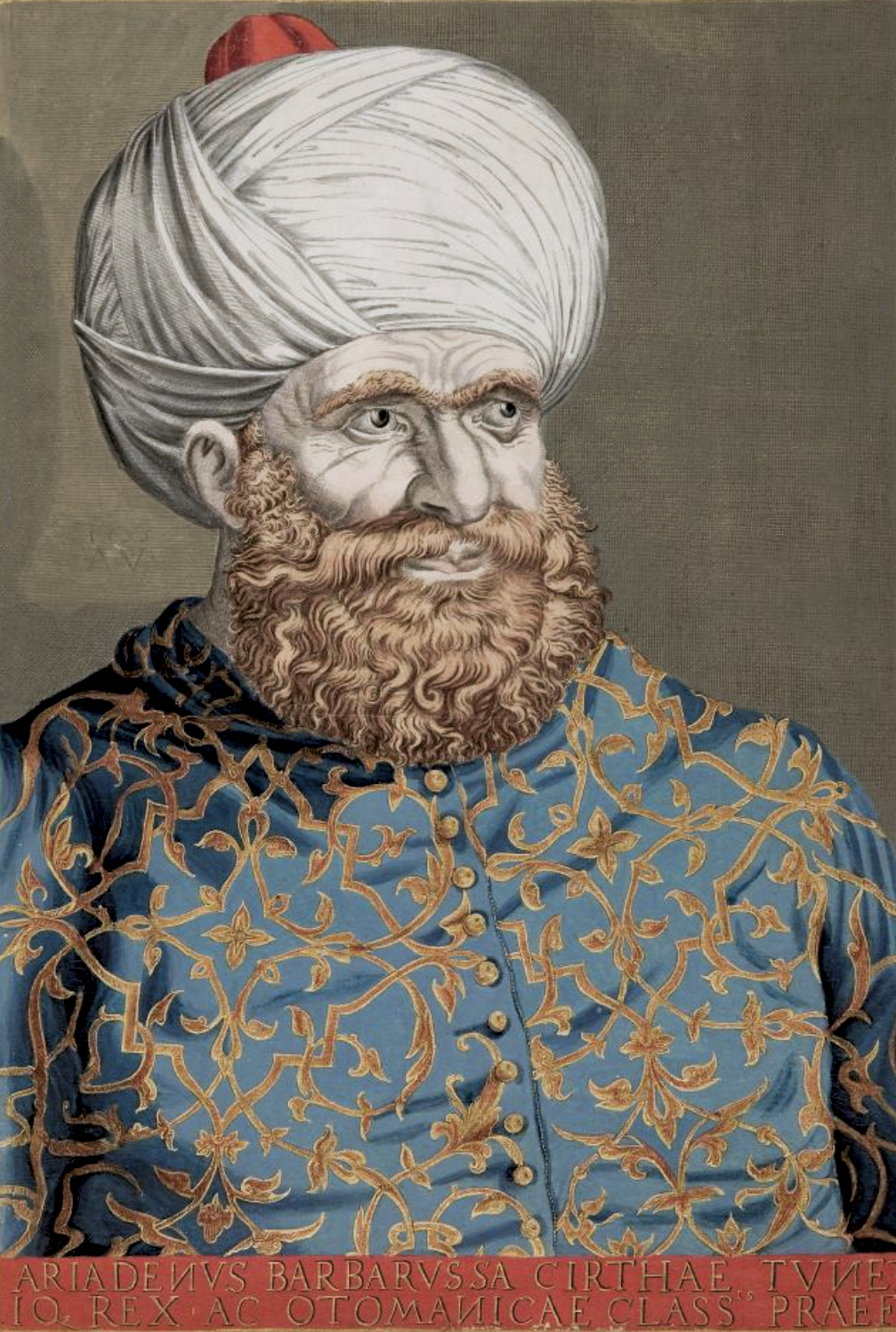
Admiral of the fleet Hayreddin Barbarossa, engraving by Agostino Veneziano (c. 1490 – c. 1540)

All four brothers became seamen, engaged in marine affairs and international sea trade. The first brother to become involved in seamanship was Oruç, who was joined by his brother Ilyas. Later, obtaining his own ship, Khizr also began his career at sea. The brothers initially worked as sailors, but then turned privateers in the Mediterranean to counteract the privateering of the Knights Hospitaller (Knights of St. John) who were based on the island of Rhodes (until 1522). Oruç and Ilyas operated in the Levant, between Anatolia, Syria, and Egypt. Khizr operated in the Aegean Sea and based his operations mostly in Thessaloniki. Ishak, the eldest, remained on Mytilene and was involved with the financial affairs of the family business.

=== Death of Ilyas, captivity, and liberation of Oruç ===
Oruç was a very successful seaman. He also learned to speak Italian, Spanish, French, Greek, and Arabic early in his career. While returning from a trading expedition in Tripoli, Lebanon, with his younger brother, Ilyas, they were attacked by the Knights Hospitaller. Ilyas was killed in the fight, and Oruç was wounded. Oruç rowed as a galley slave for the Order of Saint John for four years, until his father paid the ransom to release him.

=== Oruç, the corsair ===
Oruç later went to Antalya, where he was given 18 galleys by Şehzade Korkut, an Ottoman prince and governor of the city, and charged with fighting against the Knights of St John, who were inflicting serious damage on Ottoman shipping and trade. In the following years, when Korkut became governor of Manisa, he gave Oruç a larger fleet of 24 galleys at the port of İzmir and ordered him to participate in the Ottoman naval expedition to Apulia in Italy, where Oruç bombarded several coastal castles and captured two ships.

On his way back to Lesbos, he stopped at Euboea and captured three galleons and another ship. Reaching Mytilene with these captured vessels, Oruç learned that Korkut, who was the brother of the new Ottoman sultan Selim I, had fled to Egypt to avoid being killed because of succession disputes – a common practice at that time.

Fearing trouble due to his well-known association with the exiled Ottoman prince, Oruç sailed to Egypt, where he met Korkut in Cairo and managed to get an audience with the Mamluk Sultan Qansuh al-Ghawri, who gave him another ship and entrusted him with the task of raiding the coasts of Italy and the islands of the Mediterranean that were controlled by Christians. After spending the winter in Cairo, he set sail from Alexandria and frequently operated along the coasts of Liguria and Sicily.

=== Khizr's career under Oruç ===
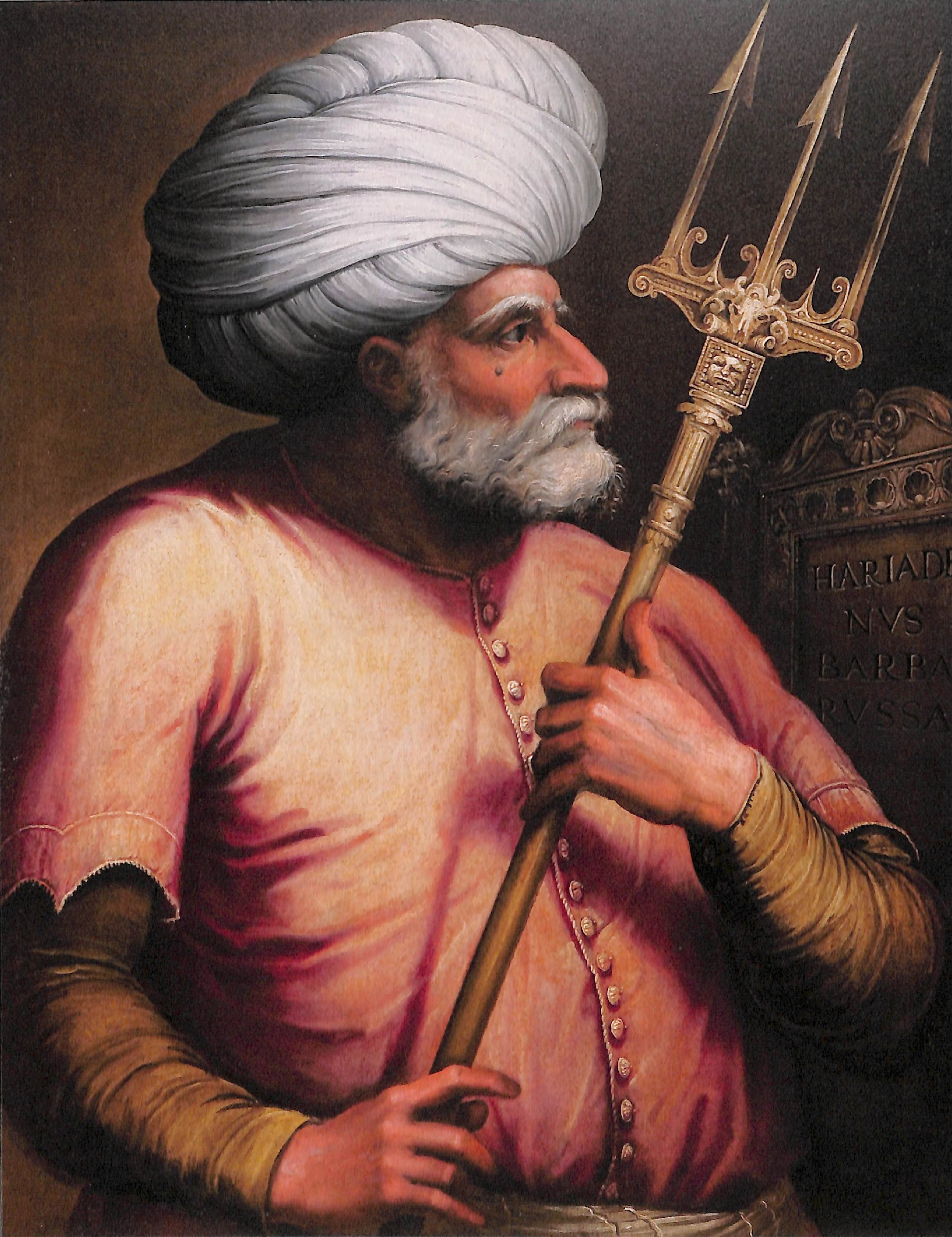
Western depiction of Hayreddin Barbarossa. His trident is meant as an allegory of sea-power. (Anon, 16th century).

In 1503, Oruç managed to seize three more ships and made the island of Djerba his new base, thus moving his operations to the Western Mediterranean. Khizr joined Oruç at Djerba. In 1504, the brothers contacted Abu Abdallah Muhammad IV al-Mutawakkil, ruler of Tunis, and asked permission to use the strategically located port of La Goulette for their operations.

They were granted the right to do so on the condition of giving one-third of their spoils to the sultan. Oruç, in command of small galiots, captured two much larger papal galleys near the island of Elba. Later, near Lipari, the two brothers captured a Sicilian warship, the Cavalleria, with 380 Spanish soldiers and 60 Spanish knights from Aragon on board, who were on their way from Spain to Naples. In 1505, they raided the coasts of Calabria. These exploits increased their fame, and they were joined by several other well-known Muslim corsairs, including Kurtoğlu (known in the West as Curtogoli). In 1508, they raided the coasts of Liguria, particularly Diano Marina.

In 1509, Ishak also left Mytilene and joined his brothers at La Goulette. The fame of Oruç increased when, between 1504 and 1510, he transported Muslim Mudéjars from Christian Spain to North Africa. His efforts of helping the Muslims of Spain in need and transporting them to safer lands earned him the honorific name Baba Oruç (Father Oruç), which eventually – due to the similarity in sound – evolved in Spain, France, and Italy into Barbarossa (meaning "Redbeard" in Italian).

In 1510, the three brothers raided Capo Passero in Sicily and repulsed Spanish attacks on Bougie, Oran and Algiers. In August 1511, they raided the areas around Reggio Calabria in southern Italy. In August 1512, the exiled ruler of Bougie invited the brothers to drive out the Spaniards, and during the battle Oruç lost his left arm. This incident earned him the nickname Gümüş Kol ("Silver Arm" in Turkish), in reference to the silver prosthetic device that he used in place of his missing limb.

Later that same year, the brothers raided the coasts of Andalusia, capturing a galiot of the Lomellini family of Genoa, which owned Tabarca island. They subsequently landed at Menorca and captured a coastal castle and then headed towards Liguria, where they captured four Genoese galleys near Genoa. The Genoese sent a fleet to liberate their ships, but the brothers captured their flagship as well. After capturing a total of 23 ships in less than a month, the brothers sailed back to La Goulette, where they built three more galiots and a gunpowder production facility.

In 1513, they launched a raid on Valencia, where they captured four ships, and then headed for Alicante and captured a Spanish galley near Málaga. In 1513–14, the brothers engaged the Spanish fleet on several other occasions and moved to their new base to Cherchell, east of Algiers. In 1514, with 12 galiots and 1,000 Turks, they destroyed two Spanish fortresses at Bougie, and when the Spanish fleet under the command of Miguel de Gurrea, viceroy of Majorca, arrived as reinforcement, they headed towards Ceuta and raided that city before capturing Jijel in Algeria, which was under Genoese control. They later captured Mahdiya in Tunisia. Afterwards they raided the coasts of Sicily, Sardinia, the Balearic Islands and the Spanish mainland, capturing three large ships there.

In 1515, they captured several galleons, a galley and three barques at Mallorca. Still in 1515, Oruç sent precious gifts to the Ottoman Sultan Selim I, who, in return, sent him two galleys and two swords encrusted with diamonds. In 1516, joined by Kurtoğlu (Curtogoli), the brothers besieged the Castle of Elba, before heading once more towards Liguria, where they captured 12 ships and damaged 28 others.

=== Rulers of Algiers ===
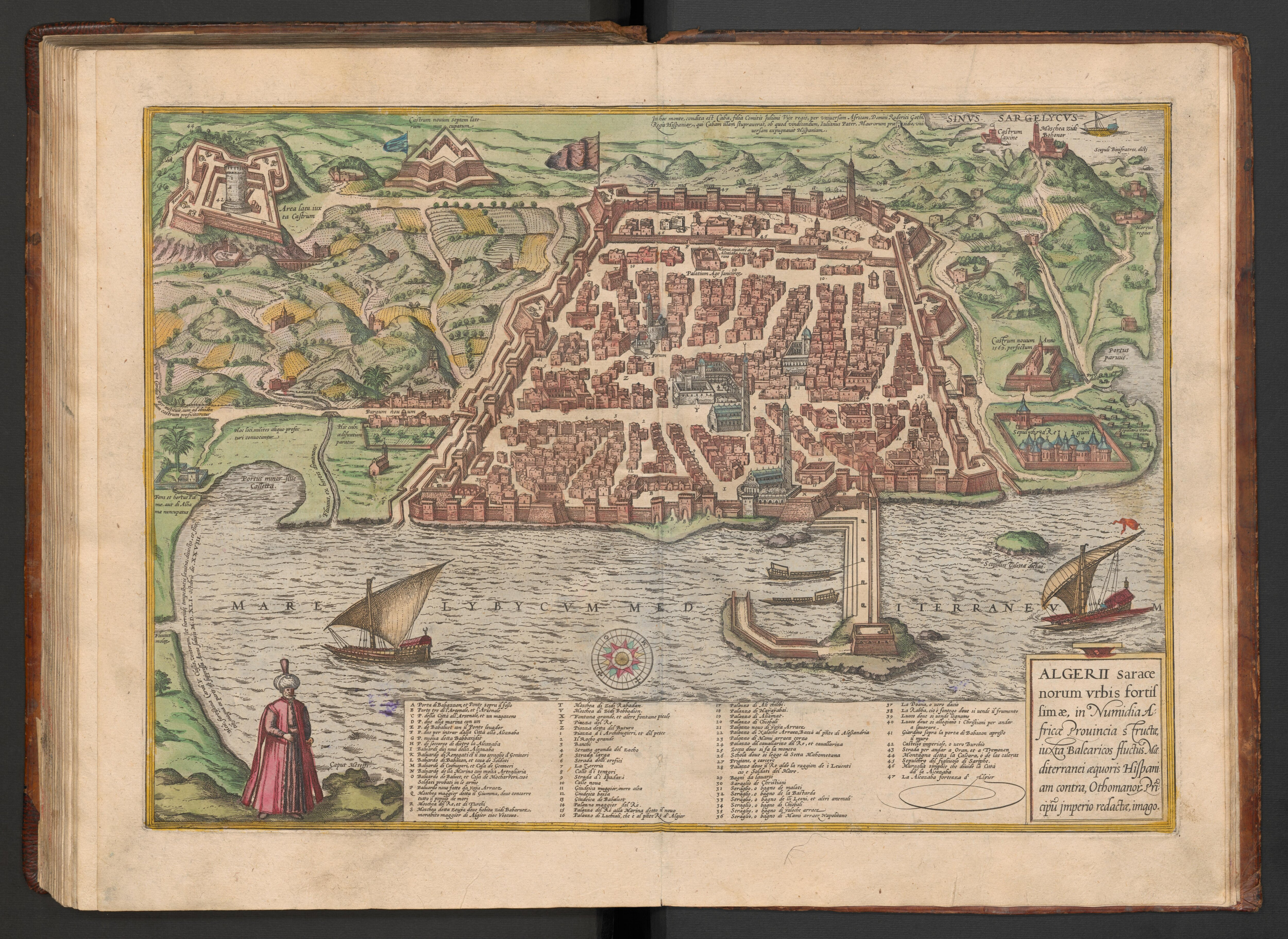
Bird's-eye view of Algiers in the 16th century, showing the Peñón attached to the city by a dam.

In 1516, the three brothers succeeded in capturing Jijel and Algiers from the Spaniards and eventually assumed control over the city and surrounding region, forcing the previous ruler, Abu Hamo Musa III of the Beni Ziyad dynasty, to flee.

The Spaniards of Algiers sought refuge on the island of Peñón and asked Charles V, King of Spain and Holy Roman Emperor to intervene, but the Spanish fleet failed to expel the brothers from Algiers.

For Oruç, the best protection against Spain was to join the Ottoman Empire, his homeland and Spain's main rival. For this, he had to relinquish his title of Sultan of Algiers to the Ottomans. He did this in 1517 and offered Algiers to the Ottoman Sultan Selim I. The Sultan accepted Algiers as an Ottoman sanjak ("province"), appointed Oruç Governor of Algiers and Chief Sea Governor of the Western Mediterranean, and promised to support him with Janissaries, galleys and cannons.

=== Final engagements and death of Oruç and Ishak ===
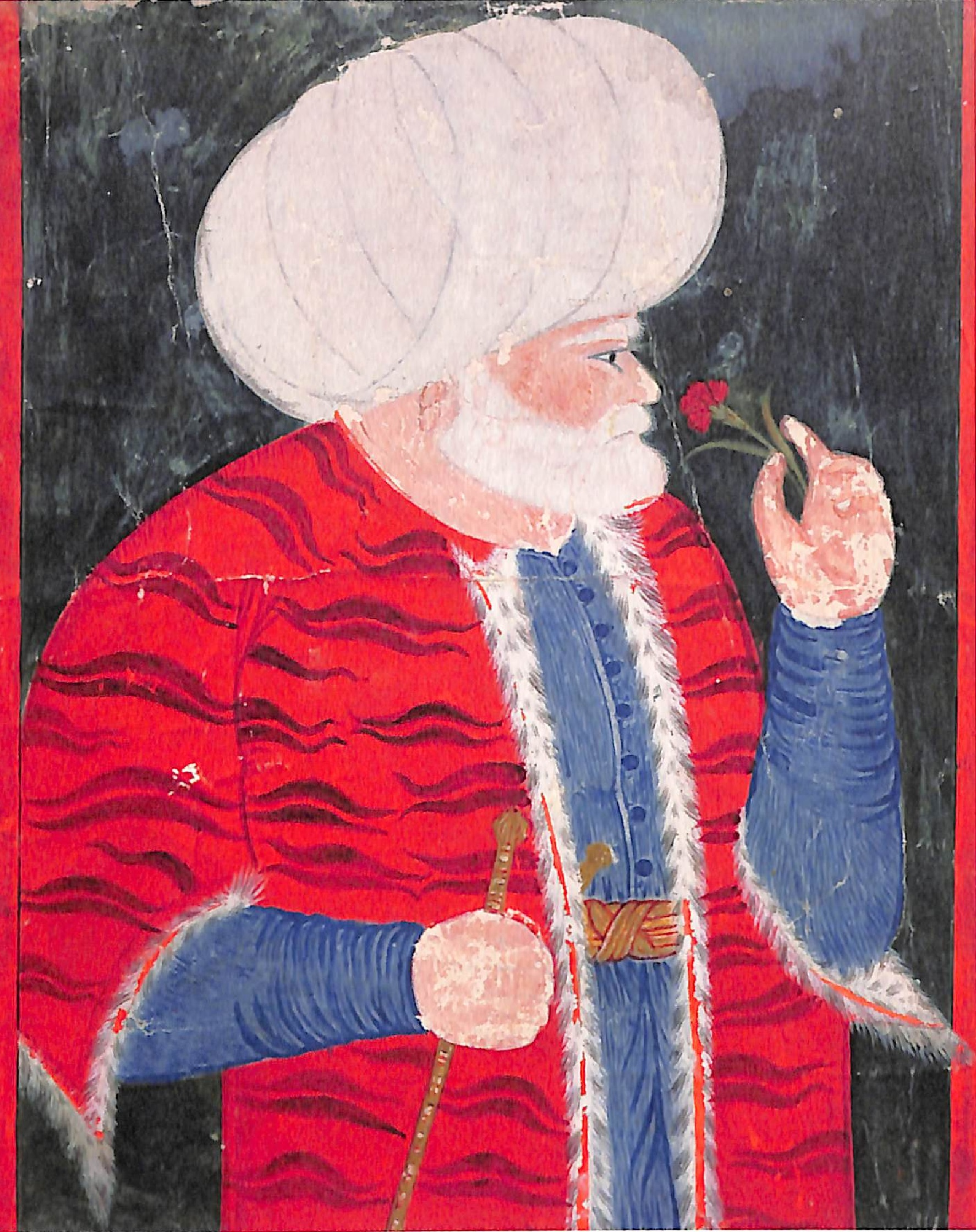
A portrait of Barbarossa by Haydar Reis, c. 1540

The Spaniards ordered Abu Zayan, whom they had appointed the new ruler of Tlemcen and Oran, to attack Oruç Reis overland, but Oruç learned of the plan and pre-emptively attacked Tlemcen, capturing the city and executing Abu Zayan in the fall of Tlemcen. The only survivor of Abu Zayan's dynasty was Sheikh Buhammud, who escaped to Oran and called for Spain's assistance.

After consolidating his power and declaring himself Sultan of Algiers, Oruç sought to expand his territory inland and took Miliana, Medea and Ténès. He became known for fitting sails to cannons for transport through the deserts of North Africa. In 1517, the brothers raided Capo Limiti, and, later, Capo Rizzuto, Calabria.

In May 1518, Emperor Charles V arrived at Oran and was received at the port by Sheikh Buhammud and the Spanish governor of the city, Diego de Córdoba, marquis of Comares, who commanded a force of 10,000 Spanish soldiers. Joined by thousands of local Bedouins, the Spaniards marched overland towards Tlemcen. Oruç and Ishak awaited them in the city with 1,500 Turkish and 5,000 Moorish soldiers. They defended Tlemcen for 20 days, but were eventually killed in combat by the forces of Garcia de Tineo.

=== Algiers joins the Ottoman Empire ===
After the death of his older brother and feeling that his position was under threat, Khizr contacted Selim I, offered his allegiance and obtained Ottoman assistance in 1519. Given the title of Beylerbey by Sultan Selim I, along with janissaries, galleys and cannons, he inherited his brother's position, his name (Barbarossa) and his mission.

== Later career ==
=== Pasha of Algiers ===
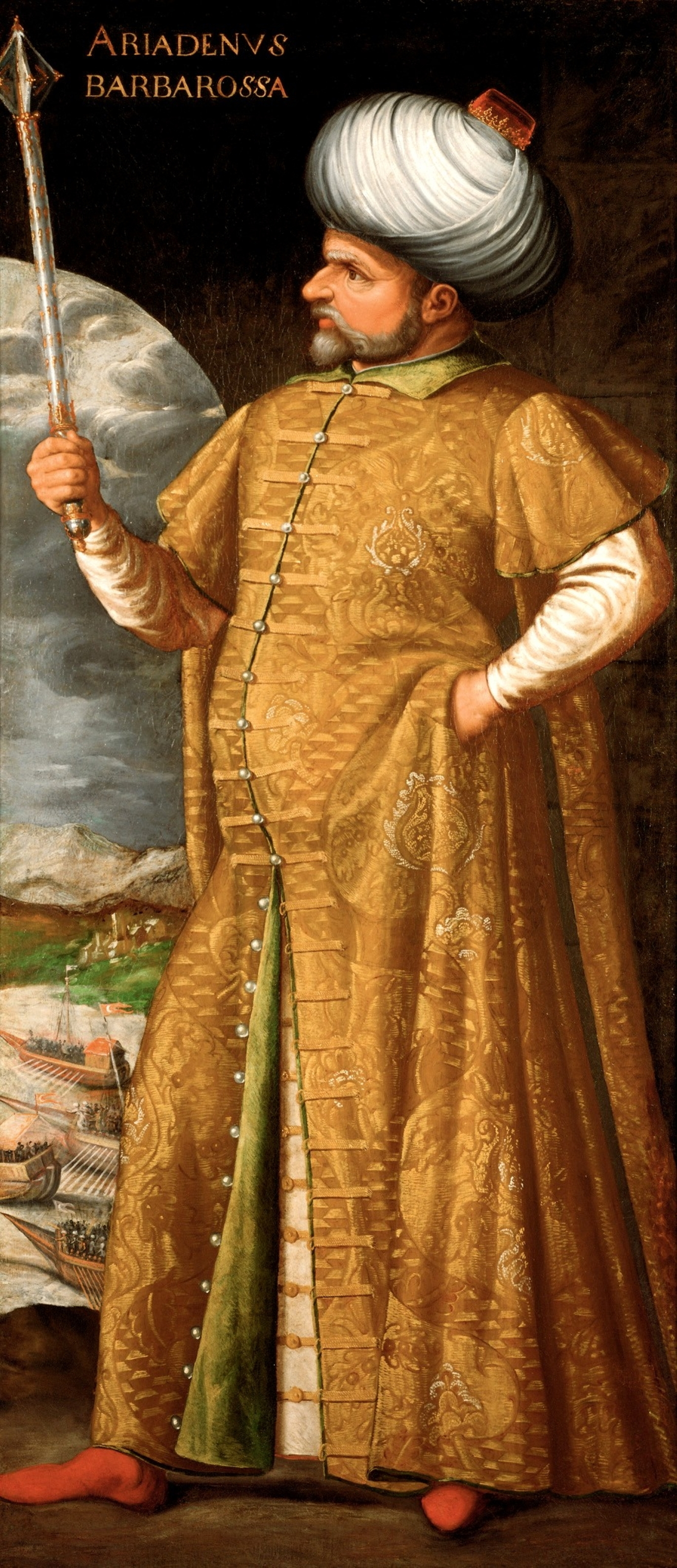
Barbarossa (Anon, circa 1580)

With a fresh force of Turkish soldiers sent by the Ottoman sultan, Barbarossa recaptured Tlemcen in December 1518. He continued the policy of bringing mudéjars from Spain to North Africa, thereby assuring himself of a sizable following of grateful and loyal Muslims who harbored an intense hatred for Spain. He captured Bône, and in 1519, he defeated a Spanish-Italian army that tried to recapture Algiers. In a separate incident, he sank a Spanish ship and captured eight others. Still in 1519, he raided Provence, Toulon and the Îles d'Hyères in southern France. In 1521, he raided the Balearic Islands and later captured several Spanish ships returning from the New World off the coast of Cádiz.

In 1522, he sent his ships, under the command of Kurtoğlu, to participate in the Ottoman conquest of Rhodes, which resulted in the departure of the Knights of St John from that island on 1 January 1523.

In June 1525, he raided the coasts of Sardinia. In May 1526, he landed at Crotone in Calabria and sacked the city, sank a Spanish galley and a Spanish fusta in the harbor, then assaulted Castignano in Marche on the Adriatic Sea and later landed at Cape Spartivento. In June 1526, he landed at Reggio Calabria and later destroyed the fort at the port of Messina. He then appeared on the coasts of Tuscany, but retreated after seeing the fleet of Andrea Doria and the Knights of St John off the coast of Piombino.

In July 1526, Barbarossa appeared once again in Messina and raided the coasts of Campania. In 1527, he raided many ports and castles on the coasts of Italy and Spain. In May 1529, he captured the Spanish fort on the island of Peñón of Algiers. In August 1529, he attacked the Mediterranean coasts of Spain, and later, answering Andalusia's requests for help in crossing the Strait of Gibraltar, he transported 70,000 mudéjars to Algiers in seven consecutive journeys.

In January 1530, he again raided the coasts of Sicily and, in March and June of that year, the Balearic Islands and Marseilles. In July 1530, he appeared along the coasts of the Provence and Liguria, capturing two Genoese ships. In August 1530, he raided the coasts of Sardinia and, in October, appeared at Piombino, capturing a barque from Viareggio and three French galleons before capturing two more ships off Calabria. In December 1530, he captured the Castle of Cabrera, in the Balearic Islands, and began to use the island as a logistic base for his operations on the area.

In 1531, he encountered Andrea Doria, who had been appointed by Charles V, Holy Roman Emperor to recapture Jijel and the Peñón of Algiers, and repulsed a Spanish-Genoese fleet of 40 galleys. Still in 1531, he raided the island of Favignana, where the flagship of the Maltese Knights under the command of Francesco Touchebeuf unsuccessfully attacked his fleet. Barbarossa then sailed eastwards and landed in Calabria and Apulia. On the way back to Algiers, he sank a ship of the Maltese Knights near Messina before assaulting Tripoli, which had been given to the Knights of St John by Charles V in 1530. In October 1531, he again raided the coasts of Spain. He also pillaged the Îles d'Hyères during the same year.

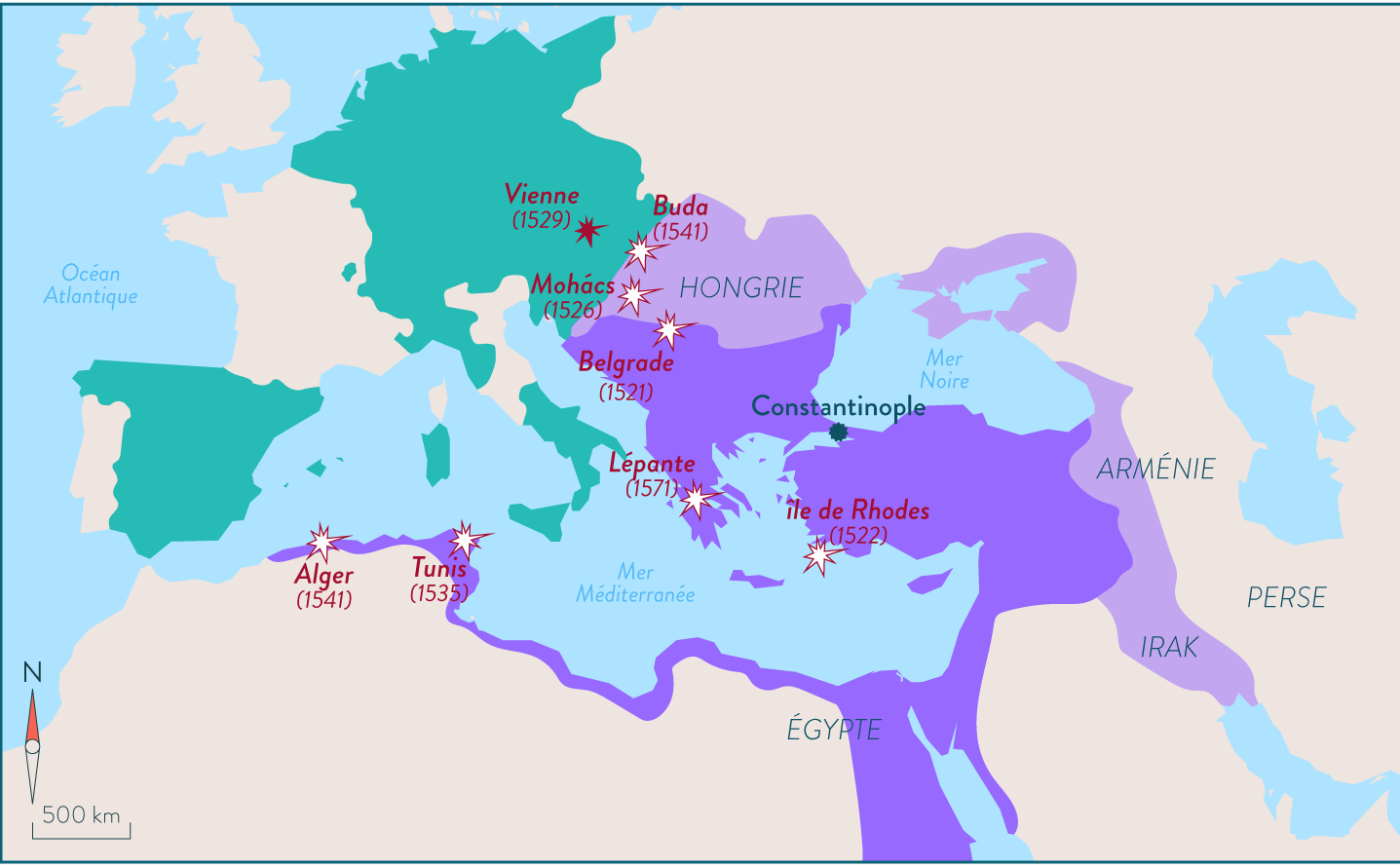
Ottoman conquests and battles during the Ottoman–Habsburg wars in the 16th century

In 1532, during Suleiman I's expedition to Habsburg Austria, Andrea Doria captured Coron, Patras and Lepanto on the coasts of the Morea (Peloponnese). In response, Suleiman sent the forces of Yahya Pashazade Mehmed Bey, who recaptured these cities, but the event made Suleiman realize the importance of having a powerful commander at sea. He summoned Barbarossa to Istanbul, who set sail in August 1532. Having raided Sardinia, Bonifacio in Corsica, and the islands of Montecristo, Elba and Lampedusa, he captured 18 galleys near Messina and learned from the captured prisoners that Doria was headed to Preveza.

Barbarossa proceeded to raid the nearby coasts of Calabria and then sailed towards Preveza. Doria's forces fled after a short battle, but only after Barbarossa had captured seven of their galleys. He arrived at Preveza with a total of 44 galleys, but sent 25 of them back to Algiers and headed to Constantinople with 19 ships. There, he was received by Sultan Suleiman at Topkapı Palace. Suleiman appointed Barbarossa Kapudan-i Derya ("Grand Admiral") of the Ottoman Navy and Beylerbey ("Chief Governor") of North Africa. Barbarossa was also given the government of the sanjak ("province") of Rhodes and those of Euboea and Chios in the Aegean Sea.

==== Diplomacy with France ====
In 1533, Barbarossa sent an embassy to the king of France, Francis I, the Ottoman embassy to France (1533). Francis I would in turn dispatch Antonio Rincon to Barbarossa in North Africa and then to Suleiman the Magnificent in Asia Minor. Following a second embassy, the Ottoman embassy to France (1534), Francis I sent his ambassador Jehan de la Forest to Hayreddin Barbarossa, asking for his naval support against the Habsburg:

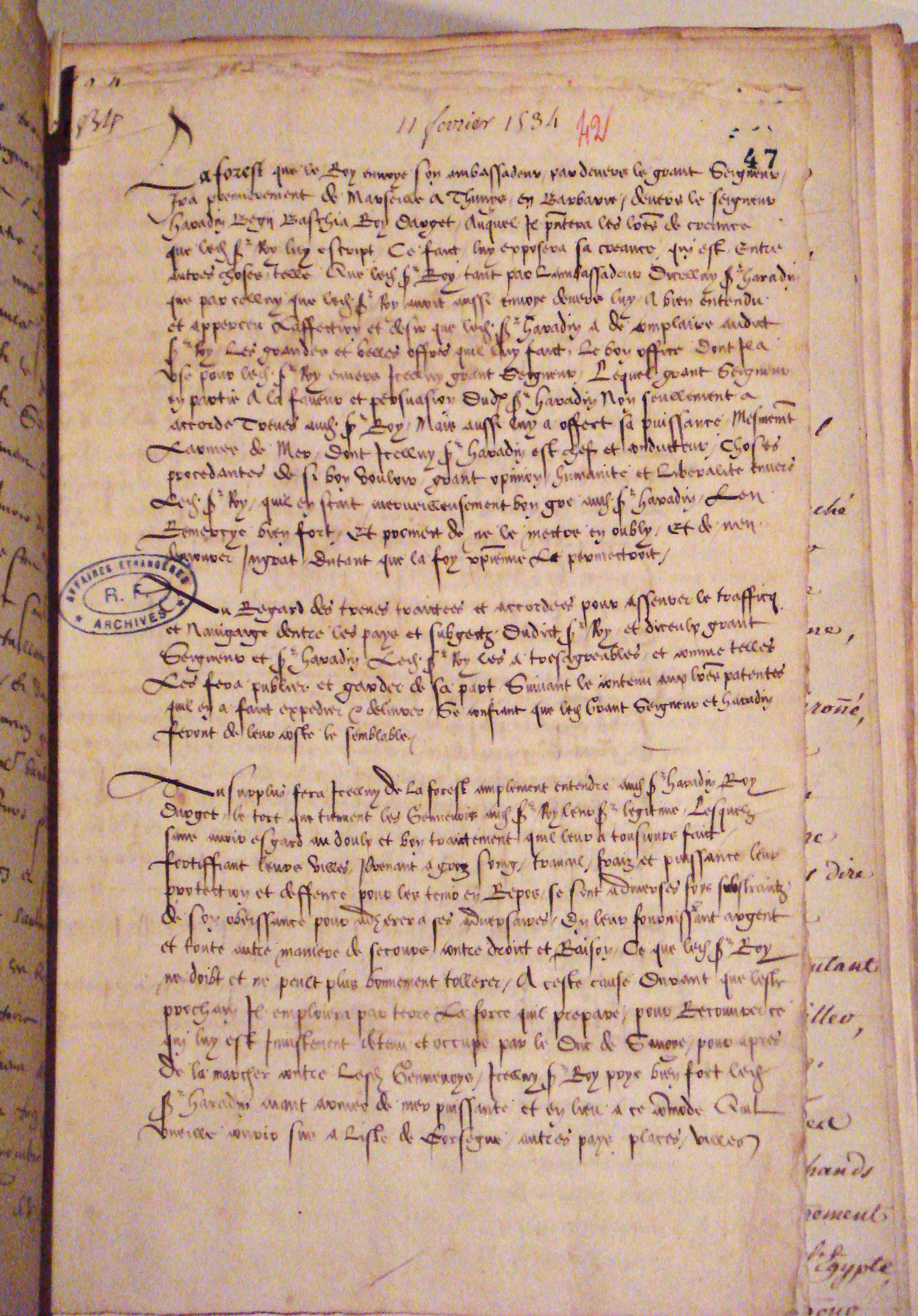
Military instructions to Jehan de la Forest, by Chancellor Antoine Duprat (copy), 11 February 1535

"Jehan de la Forest, whom the King sends to meet with the Grand Signor [Suleiman the Magnificent], will first go from Marseilles to Tunis, in Barbary, to meet sir Haradin, king of Algiers, who will direct him to the Grand Signor. To this objective, next summer, he [the King of France] will send the military force he is preparing to recover what it unjustly occupied by the Duke of Savoy, and from there, to attack the Genoese. This king Francis I strongly prays sir Haradin, who has a powerful naval force as well as a convenient location [Tunisia], to attack the island of Corsica and other lands, locations, cities, ships and subjects of Genoa, and not to stop until they have accepted and recognized the king of France. The King, besides the above land force, will additionally help with his naval force, which will comprise at least 50 vessels, of which 30 galleys, and the rest galeasses and other vessels, accompanied by one of the largest and most beautiful carracks that ever was on the sea. This fleet will accompany and escort the army of sir Haradin, which will also be refreshed and supplied with food and ammunition by the King, who, by these actions, will be able to achieve his aims, for which he will be highly grateful to sir Haradin".

— Military instructions to Jehan de la Forest, by Chancellor Antoine Duprat, 11 February 1534.

=== Kapudan-i Derya of the Ottoman Navy ===
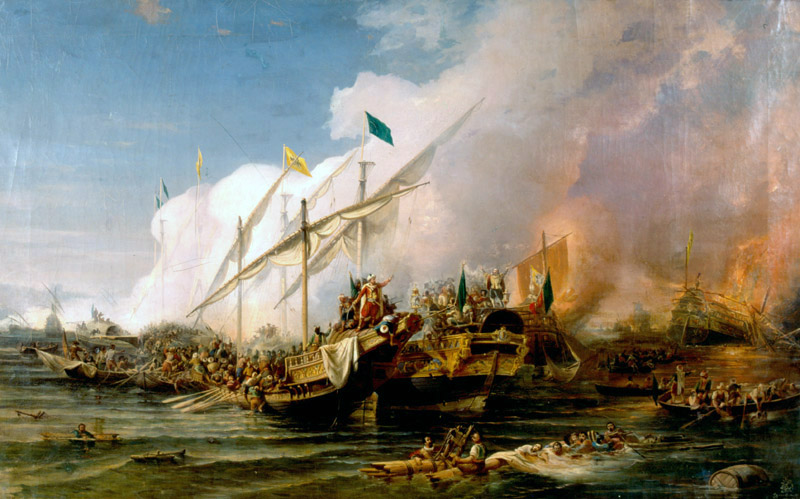
Barbarossa Hayreddin Pasha defeats the Holy League of Charles V under the command of Andrea Doria at the Battle of Preveza in 1538

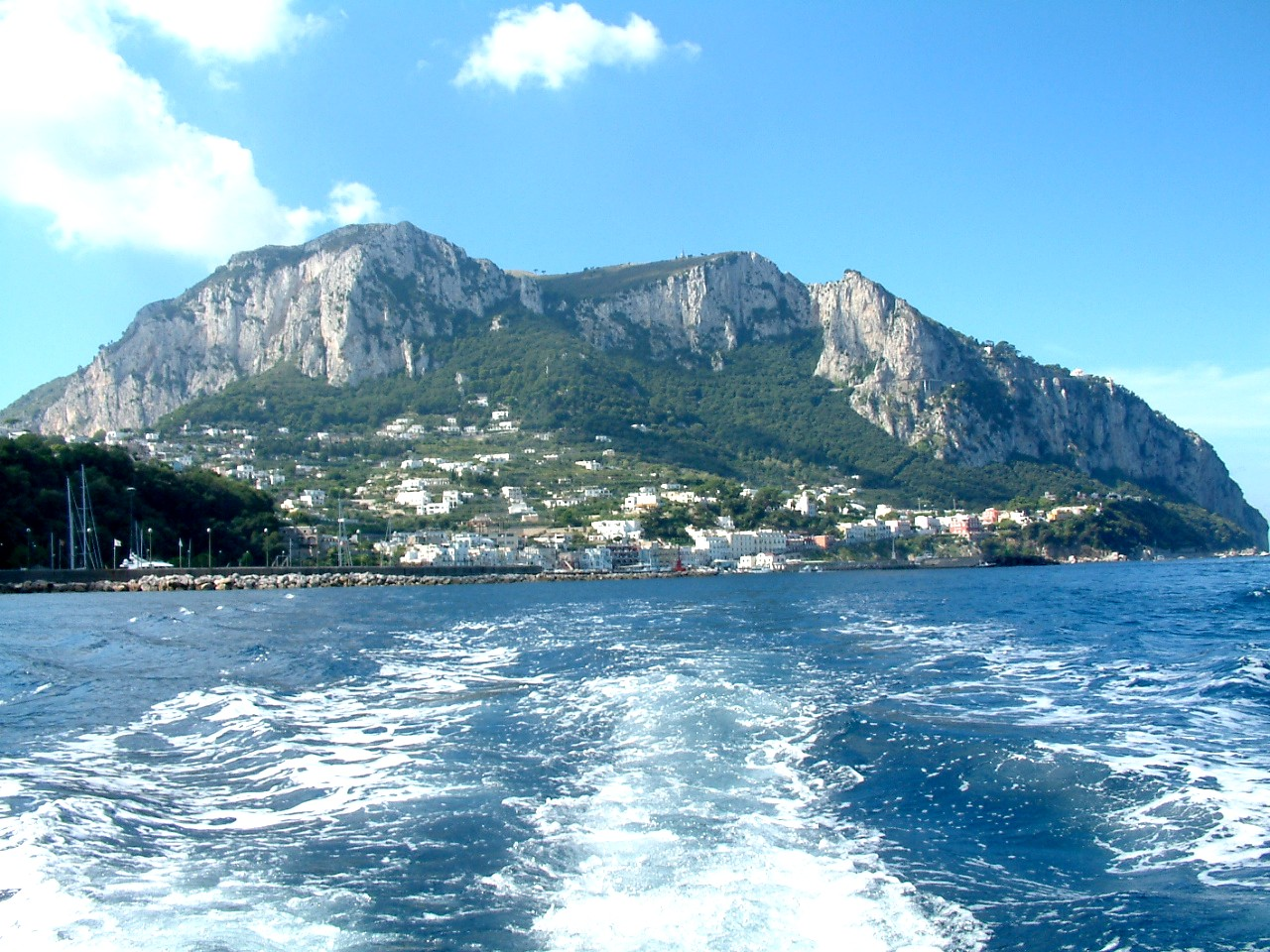
Barbarossa's Castle on Capri. The Ottomans eventually departed from Capri, but another famous Ottoman admiral, Dragut, recaptured both the island and the castle in 1553.

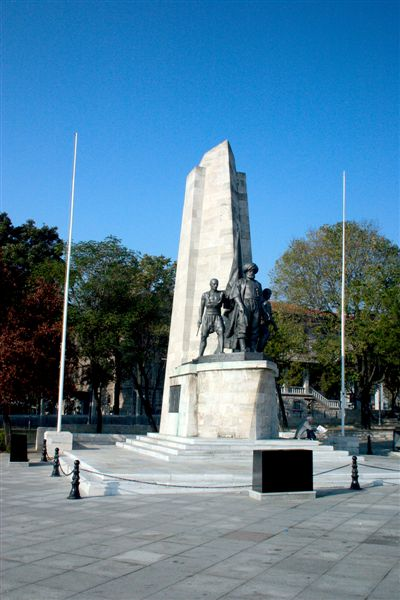
Statue of Barbarossa near the Istanbul Naval Museum on the Bosphorus in Istanbul

In 1534, Barbarossa set sail from Constantinople with 80 galleys, and in April, he recaptured Coron, Patras and Lepanto from the Spaniards. In July 1534, he crossed the Strait of Messina and raided the Calabrian coasts, capturing a substantial number of ships around Reggio Calabria as well as the Castle of San Lucido. He later destroyed the port of Cetraro and the ships harbored there.

Also in July 1534, he appeared in Campania and sacked the islands of Capri and Procida before bombarding the ports in the Gulf of Naples, where 7,800 captives were taken. He then appeared at Fondi, then part of the Spanish-ruled Kingdom of Naples, causing the church bells in Rome to sound the alarm. In Sperlonga, also part of the Kingdom of Naples, he took 10,000 captives and when he arrived in Fondi the janissaries entered the city through the main gates and completely ransacked the palace of Giulia Gonzaga. He then sacked, torched and destroyed Vallecorsa slaughtering some townspeople and taking others captive. He sailed south, appearing at Ponza, Sicily and Sardinia, before capturing Tunis in August 1534 and sending the Hafsid Sultan Mulay Hassan fleeing.

Charles dispatched an agent to offer Barbarossa "the lordship of North Africa" for his changed loyalty, or if that failed, to assassinate him. However, upon rejecting the offer, Barbarossa decapitated the agent with a scimitar.

Mulei Hassan asked Emperor Charles V for help in recovering his kingdom, and a Spanish-Italian force of 300 galleys and 24,000 soldiers recaptured Tunis as well as Bône and Mahdiya in 1535. Recognizing the futility of armed resistance, Barbarossa had abandoned Tunis well before the arrival of the invaders, sailing away into the Tyrrhenian Sea, where he bombarded ports, landed once again at Capri and reconstructed a fort (which still today carries his name) after largely destroying it during the siege of the island. He then sailed to Algiers, from where he raided the coastal towns of Spain, destroyed the ports of Mallorca and Menorca, captured several Spanish and Genoese galleys and liberated their Muslim oar slaves. In September 1535, he repulsed another Spanish attack on Tlemcen.

In 1536, Barbarossa was called back to Constantinople to take command of 200 ships in a naval attack on the Habsburg Kingdom of Naples. In July 1537, he landed at Otranto and captured the city, as well as the Fortress of Castro and the city of Ugento in Apulia.

In August 1537, Lütfi Pasha and Barbarossa led a huge Ottoman force that captured the Aegean and Ionian islands belonging to the Republic of Venice, namely Syros, Aegina, Ios, Paros, Tinos, Karpathos, Kasos, Kythira, and Naxos. In the same year, Barbarossa raided Corfu and obliterated the agricultural cultivations of the island while enslaving nearly all the population of the countryside. However, the Old Fortress of Corfu was well defended by a 4,000-strong Venetian garrison with 700 guns, and when several assaults failed to capture the fortifications, the Turks reluctantly re-embarked and once again raided Calabria. These losses prompted Venice to ask Pope Paul III to organize a "Holy League" against the Ottomans.

In February 1538, Pope Paul III succeeded in assembling a Holy League (composed of the Papacy, Spain, the Holy Roman Empire, the Republic of Venice and the Maltese Knights) against the Ottomans, but Barbarossa's forces led by Sinan Reis defeated its combined fleet, commanded by Andrea Doria, at the Battle of Preveza in September 1538. This victory secured Ottoman dominance over the Mediterranean for the next 33 years, until the Battle of Lepanto in 1571.

In the summer of 1539, Barbarossa captured the islands of Skiathos, Skyros, Andros, and Serifos and recaptured Castelnuovo from the Spanish, who had taken it from the Ottomans after the battle of Preveza. He also captured the nearby Castle of Risan, and with Sinan Reis, later assaulted the Venetian fortress of Cattaro and the Spanish fortress of Santa Veneranda near Pesaro. Barbarossa later took the remaining Christian outposts in the Ionian and Aegean Seas. Venice finally signed a peace treaty with Sultan Suleiman in October 1540, agreeing to recognize the Ottoman territorial gains and to pay 300,000 gold ducats.

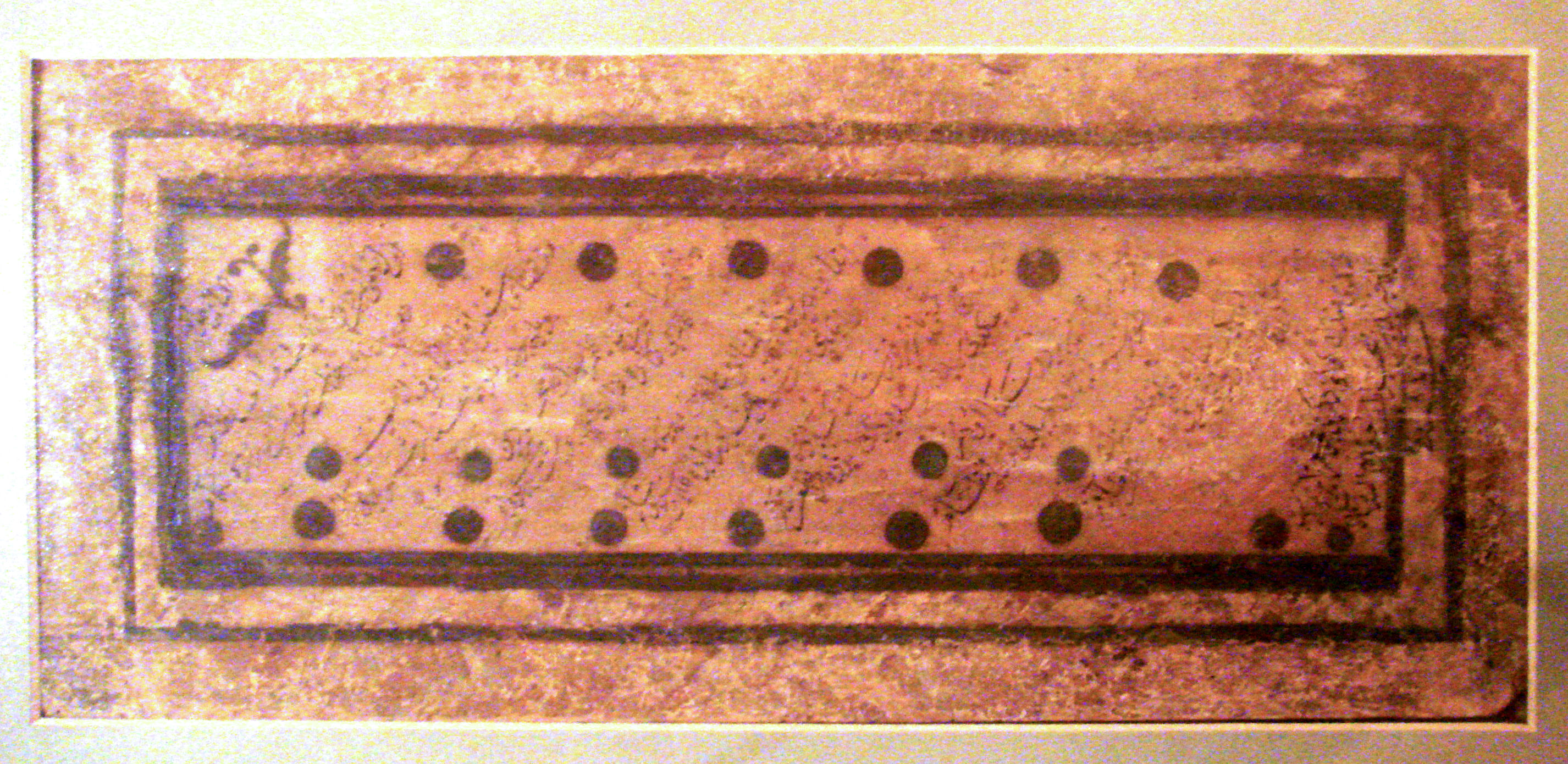
Letter of praise from Barbarossa to Suleiman, 1541, Istanbul Naval Museum

In 1540 Barbarossa led a crew of 2,000 men and captured and ransacked the town of Gibraltar. He left Gibraltar after taking 75 prisoners which removed a significant percent of Gibraltar's population, he ultimately eliminated the town of almost an entire generation of Gibraltarians.

In September 1540, Emperor Charles V contacted Barbarossa and offered him to become his Admiral-in-Chief as well as the ruler of Spain's territories in North Africa, but he refused. Unable to persuade Barbarossa to switch sides, in October 1541, Charles himself laid siege to Algiers, seeking to end the corsair threat to the Spanish domains and Christian shipping in the western Mediterranean. The season was not ideal for such a campaign, and both Andrea Doria, who commanded the fleet, and Hernán Cortés, who had been asked by Charles to participate in the campaign, attempted to change the Emperor's mind but failed.

Eventually, a violent storm disrupted Charles's landing operations. Andrea Doria took his fleet away into open waters to avoid being wrecked on the shore, but much of the Spanish fleet went aground. After some indecisive fighting on land, Charles had to abandon the effort and withdraw his severely battered force.

==== Franco-Ottoman alliance ====
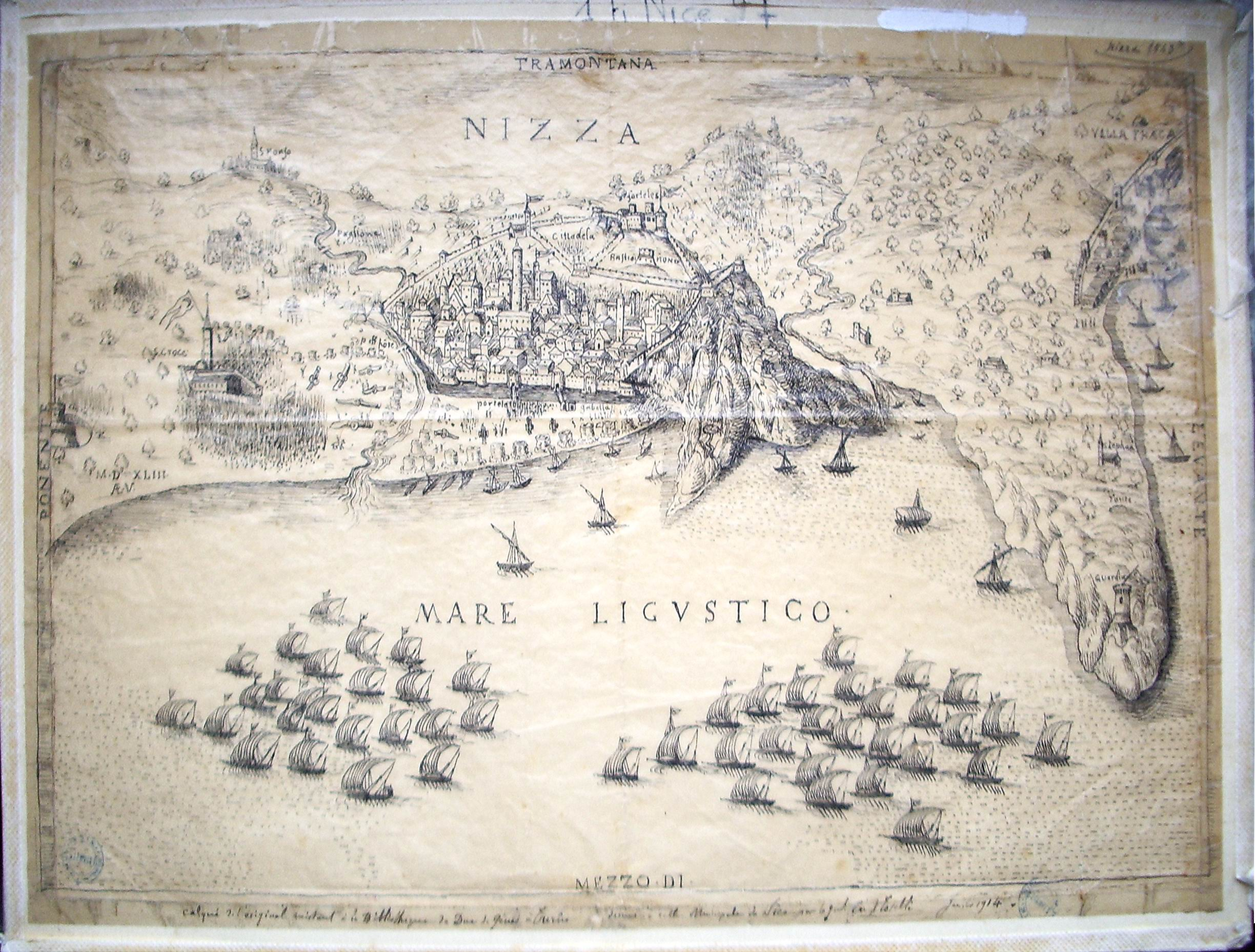
Barbarossa's fleet combined with a French force to besiege Nice in 1543 before the city fell

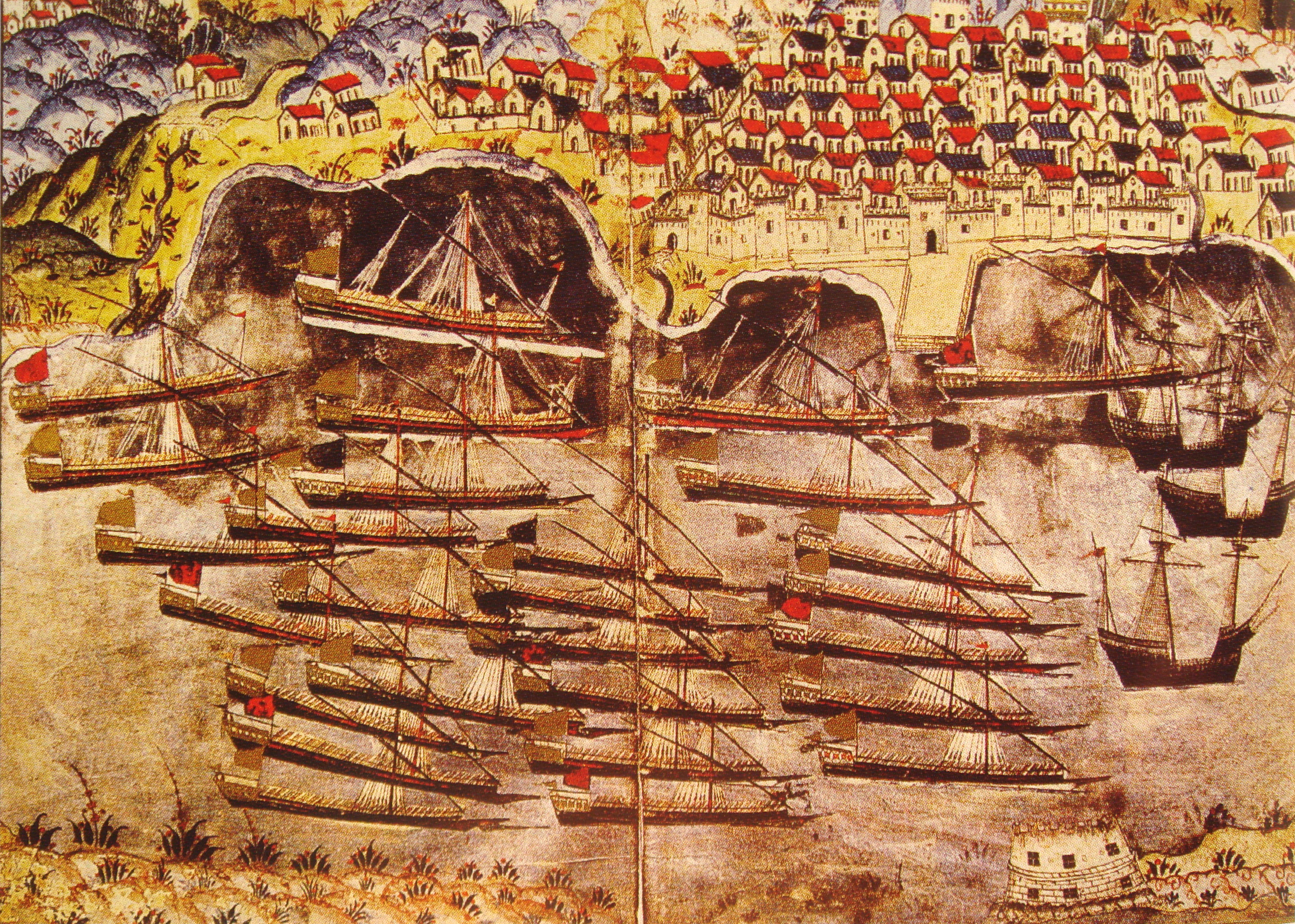
Barbarossa's Ottoman fleet wintering in Toulon, 1543–44

In 1543, Barbarossa headed towards Marseilles to assist France, then an ally of the Ottoman Empire, and cruised the western Mediterranean with a fleet of 210 ships (70 galleys, 40 galiots and 100 other warships carrying 14,000 Turkish soldiers, thus an overall total of 30,000 Ottoman troops). On his way, while passing through the Strait of Messina, he asked Diego Gaetani, governor of Reggio Calabria, to surrender his city. Gaetani responded with cannon fire, which killed three Turkish sailors.

Barbarossa laid siege to Nice and captured the city on 5 August 1543 on behalf of the French king, Francis I.

The Ottoman captain later landed at Antibes and the Île Sainte-Marguerite near Cannes before sacking the city of San Remo, other ports of Liguria, Monaco and La Turbie. King Francis ordered the evacuation of Toulon and placed the city in the hands of Barbarossa. For the next six months Toulon was converted to a Turkish city which included its own mosque and slave market.

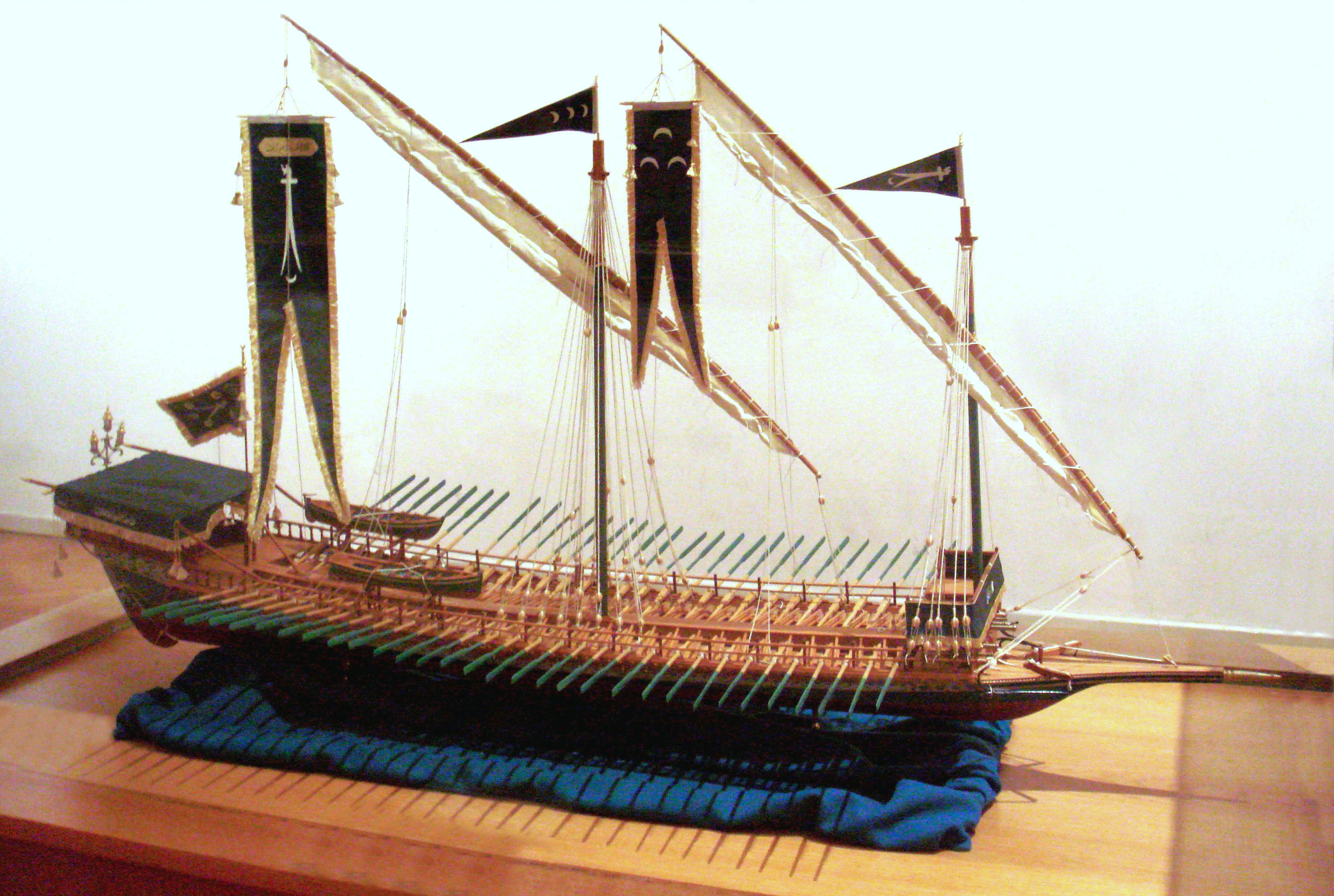
A model of Barbarossa's galley during his campaign in France in 1543–44, at the Istanbul Naval Museum

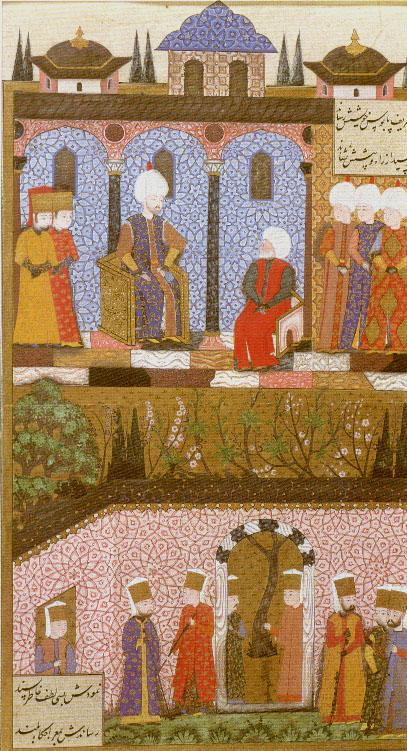
Suleiman the Magnificent receiving Barbarossa in Istanbul

Barbarossa then successfully repulsed further Spanish attacks on southern France, but was recalled to Istanbul after Charles V and Suleiman had agreed to a truce in 1544.

After leaving Provence from the port of Île Sainte-Marguerite in May 1544, Barbarossa assaulted San Remo for the third time, and when he appeared before Vado Ligure, the Republic of Genoa sent him a substantial sum to save other Genoese cities from further attacks. In June 1544, Barbarossa appeared before Elba. Threatening to bombard Piombino unless the city's Lord released the son of Sinan Reis who had been captured and baptized 10 years earlier by the Spaniards in Tunis, he obtained his release.

The Ottoman fleet then assaulted the coasts of Sardinia, before appearing at Ischia and landing there in July 1544, capturing the city as well as Forio and the island of Procida, where he took 4,000 prisoners and enslaved some 2,000–7,000 inhabitants of Lipari; after which, he threatened Pozzuoli. Encountering 30 galleys under Giannettino Doria, Barbarossa forced them to sail away towards Sicily and seek refuge in Messina. Due to strong winds, the Ottomans were unable to attack Salerno but managed to land at Cape Palinuro nearby. Barbarossa then entered the Strait of Messina and landed at Catona, Fiumara and Calanna (near Reggio Calabria) and later at Cariati and at Lipari, which was his final landing on the Italian peninsula. There, he bombarded the citadel for 15 days after the city refused to surrender and eventually captured it.

He finally returned to Constantinople and, in 1545, left the city for his final naval expeditions, during which he bombarded the ports of the Spanish mainland and landed at Mallorca and Menorca for the last time. He then sailed back to Constantinople and built a palace on the Bosphorus, in the present-day quarter of Büyükdere in the Sarıyer district.

=== Retirement and death ===
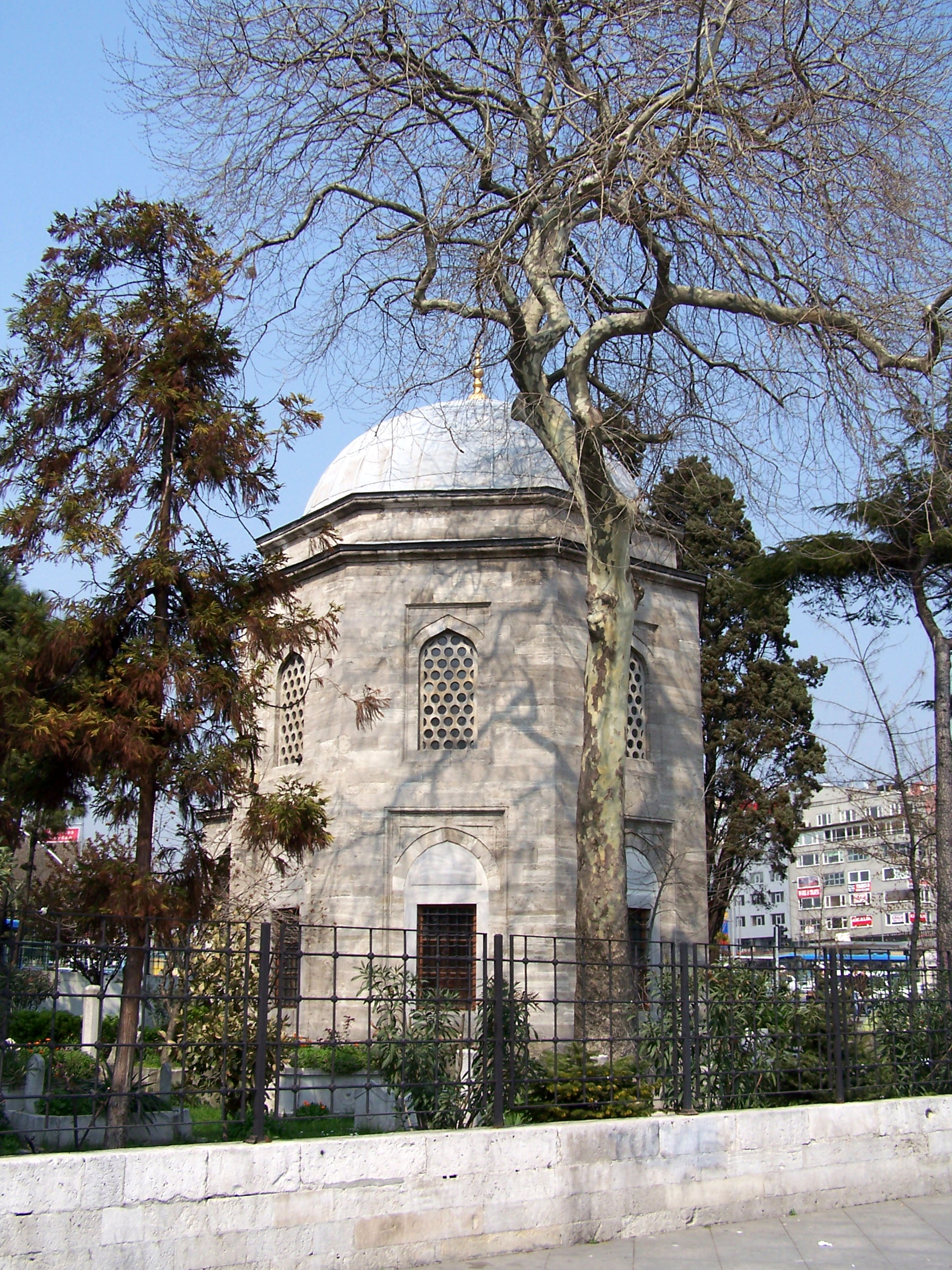
Barbarossa's tomb in the Beşiktaş district of Istanbul

Barbarossa retired in Constantinople in 1545, leaving his son Hasan Pasha as his successor in Algiers. He then dictated his memoirs to Muradi Sinan Reis. They consist of five hand-written volumes known as Gazavat-ı Hayreddin Paşa (Conquests of Hayreddin Pasha). Today, they are exhibited at the Topkapı Palace and Istanbul University Library. They are prepared and published by Babıali Kültür Yayıncılığı as Kaptan Paşa'nın Seyir Defteri (The Logbook of the Captain Pasha) by Prof. Dr. Ahmet Şimşirgil, a Turkish academic. They are also fictionalised as Akdeniz Bizimdi (The Mediterranean was Ours) by M. Ertuğrul Düzdağ. Barbarossa is also one of the main characters in Mika Waltari's book The Wanderer (1949).

Barbarossa Hayreddin Pasha died in 1546 in his seaside palace in the Büyükdere neighbourhood of Istanbul, on the northwestern shores of the Bosphorus. He is buried in the tall mausoleum (türbe) near the ferry port of the district of Beşiktaş on the European side of Istanbul, which was built in 1541 by the famous architect Mimar Sinan, at the site where his fleet used to assemble. His memorial was built in 1944, next to his mausoleum.

=== The Flag (Sanjak) of Hayreddin Barbarossa ===
Barbarossa's flag

The Arabic calligraphy at the top of the standard reads, "نَصرٌ مِنَ اللَّـهِ وَفَتحٌ قَريبٌ وَبَشِّرِ المُؤمِنينَ يَا مُحَمَّد" (nasrun mina'llāhi wa fatḥhun qarībun wa bashshiri'l-mu'minīna yā muḥammad), translated as "Victory from Allah and an eminent conquest; and give good tidings to the believers, O Muhammad." The text comes from verse 61:13 of the Quran, with the addition of "O Muhammad", since the last part of the verse addresses the Islamic prophet, Muhammad.

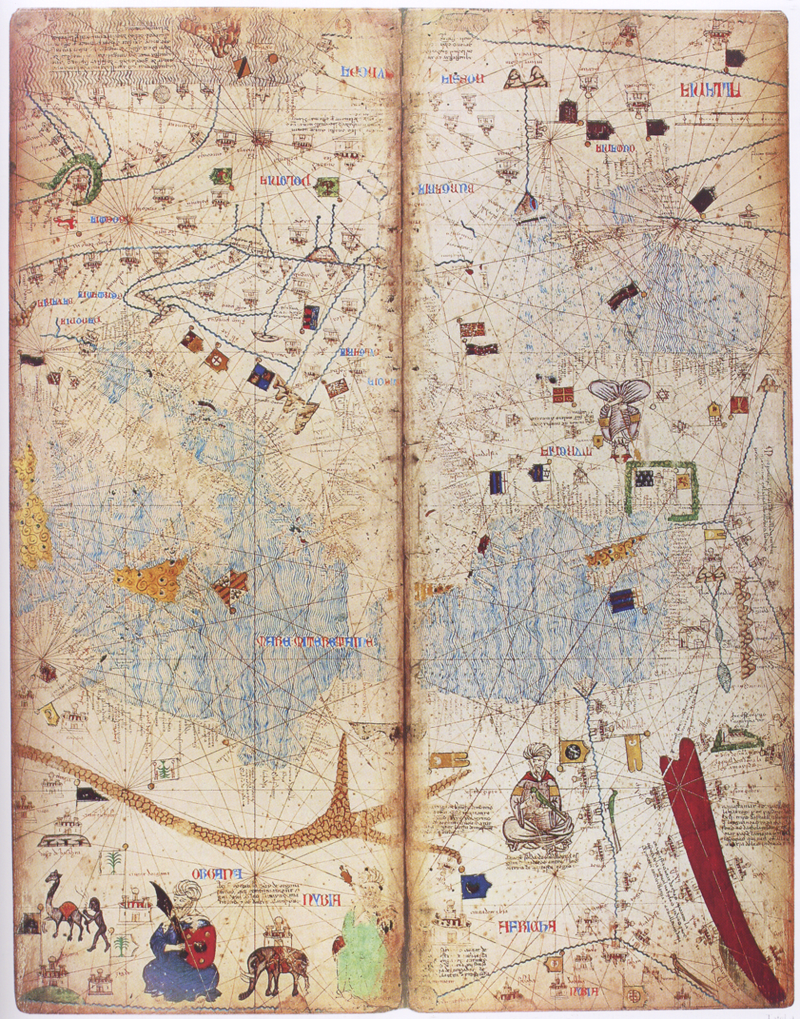
Catalan Atlas by Abraham Cresques

Within the four crescents are the names, from right to left, beginning at the top right, of the first four caliphs – Abu Bakr, Umar, Uthman, and Ali – whose rule of the Islamic state after Muhammad is referred to as the Rashidun Caliphate.

The two-bladed sword represents Dhu'l-Fiqar, a famous sword in Islamic history, belonging first to Muhammad and then Ali. To the left of the sword's hilt is a small hand.

Between the two blades of the sword is a six-pointed star. The star may be confused with the Star of David, a Jewish symbol. However, in medieval times, this star was a popular Islamic symbol known as the Seal of Solomon and was widely used by the Beyliks of Anatolia. The seal was later used by the Ottomans in their mosque decorations, coins and the personal flags of the pashas, including Hayreddin Barbarossa. One of the Turkish beyliks known to use the seal on its flag was the Jandarids. According to the Catalan Atlas of 1375 by A. Cresques, the flag of the Karamanids, another Anatolian beylik, consisted of a blue six-edged star.

== Legacy ==
Hayreddin Barbarossa established the Ottoman supremacy in the Mediterranean, which lasted until the Battle of Lepanto in 1571.

During these centuries, among seamen such as Kemal Reis before him; his brother Oruç Reis and other contemporaries Turgut Reis, Salih Reis, Piri Reis and Kurtoğlu Muslihiddin Reis; or Piyale Pasha, Murat Reis, Seydi Ali Reis, Uluç Ali Reis and Kurtoğlu Hızır Reis after him, few other Ottoman admirals achieved the naval power of Hayreddin Barbarossa.

His mausoleum is in the Barbaros Park of Beşiktaş, Istanbul, where his statue also stands, next to the Istanbul Naval Museum. On the back of the statue are verses by the Turkish poet Yahya Kemal Beyatlı, which may be translated as follows:

Whence on the sea's horizon comes that roar?

Can it be Barbarossa now returning From Tunis or Algiers or from the Isles?

Two hundred vessels ride upon the waves, Coming from lands the rising Crescent lights:

O blessed ships, from what seas are ye come?

Barbaros Boulevard starts from his mausoleum on the Bosphorus and runs up to the Levent and Maslak business districts and beyond.

In the centuries following his death, no fleet would clear the Serai Point without firing a salute at his mausoleum. This practice disappeared during the Tanzimat period and was revived by the Turkish navy in 2019.

Several warships of the Turkish Navy and passenger ships have been named after him.

Outside Turkey, or the wider Islamic world, the prolific British historian of naval military history, Edward Keble Chatterton, considered him "the greatest pirate that has ever lived, and one of the cleverest tacticians and strategists the Mediterranean ever bore on its waters"; noting that "his death was received by Christian Europe with a sigh of the greatest relief."

The Barbaros Hayrettin Pasha Mosque complex built in the Levent neighborhood of Istanbul was named after him.

== Cultural depictions ==
Hayreddin Barbarossa has been the subject of many Turkish films. In the 2021 Turkish TV series Barbaros: Sword of the Mediterranean, Hayreddin Barbarossa is portrayed by actor Ulas Tuna Astepe. In the 2022 Turkish TV series Barbaros Hayreddin: Sultan's Edict, Hayreddin Barbarossa is portrayed by actor Tolgahan Sayışman.

It should also be noted that the name of Hector Barbossa (Barbosa is also a Galician-Portuguese surname), a fictional character in the Pirates of the Caribbean film series, is a derivative of Hayreddin Barbarossa's.

== See also ==
- Barbary slave trade
- Ottoman wars in Europe
