= Directorate of State Archives =

- Devlet Arşivleri Başkanlığı

Agency overview
- Formed: 1984; 41 years ago
- Preceding agency: Devlet Arşivleri Genel Müdürlüğü
- Agency executive: Prof. Dr. Uğur Ünal, President
- Parent department: Office of the President of Turkey
- Website: www.devletarsivleri.gov.tr

In Turkey, the Directorate of State Archives (Turkish: Devlet Arşivleri Başkanlığı) was established in 1984 as an institution according to the Prime Ministry Organization Law No. 3056 to control the Republic Archives, Ottoman Archives and Departmental Documentations.

== History ==
In 1922, the Reservoir of Documents (Turkish: Mahzen-i Evrak Mümeyyizliği) was established in Istanbul, affiliated to Directorate of the Board of Chief Executive Offices (İcra Vekilleri Heyeti Başkanlığı). Its name was changed to the Examining Office of Document Resources (Hazine-i Evrak Mümeyyizliği) in 1923. In 1927, it became affiliated to the Prime Undersecretariat (Başvekâlet Müsteşarlığı) under the name of Managing Office of Document Resources (Hazine-i Evrak Müdür Muavinliği). In May 1933, pursuant to the Organization Law, the Document Management (Evrak Müdürlüğü) in Ankara and the Document Resources Management (Hazine-i Evrak Müdürlüğü) in Istanbul were merged under the name of Prime Documents and Document Resources Management (Başvekâlet Evrak ve Hazine-i Evrak Müdürlüğü). In 1937, the name of the Document Resources Office was changed into the Archives Department Management (Arşiv Dairesi Müdürlüğü). In 1943, the General Directorate of Public Archives (Başvekâlet Arşiv Umum Müdürlüğü) was established.

In 1976, the Republic Archives Department (Cumhuriyet Arşivi Dairesi Başkanlığı) was established under the Prime Ministry Undersecretariat (Başbakanlık Müsteşarlığı). According to the Law No. 3473, the task of this department was to record documents related to different governmental organizations and institutions after the establishment of the republic, including the Grand National Assembly of Turkey, and to keep an archive of documents related to the Turkish War of Independence and other historical events preceding the republic era (see Ottoman Archives). On 10 July 2018, it became affiliated with the Presidential Office with the Presidential Decree No. 1 and its name was changed to the "Directorate of State Archives".

== List of general managers and presidents ==
No.	Name	Tenure started	Tenure ended
Documents Examiner
1	Mahmut Nedim Bey	1925	23 May 1933
Documents Manager
1	Hıfzı Berkan	23 May 1933	16 February 1938
Archives Department Manager
1	Halid Altan	16 February 1938	29 June 1943
Archives Public Managers
1	Kenan Tuna	29 June 1943	28 April 1956
1	Prof. Dr. Halil Demircioğlu (acting)	28 April 1956	18 April 1960
1	Mithat Sertoğlu	18 April 1960	15 August 1973
Archives General Managers
1	Fazıl Işıközlü	15 August 1973	15 October 1974
1	Rukiye Bulut (acting)	15 October 1974	3 January 1975
1	Feyyaz Gürkan	3 January 1975	28 December 1978
1	Prof. Dr. Nejat Göyünç (acting)	28 December 1978	27 January 1980
1	Atilla Çetin (acting)	27 January 1980	13 May 1980
1	Lütfü Ergün (acting)	13 May 1980	30 February 1981
1	Bahaddin Alpkan (acting)	30 February 1981	14 May 1985
State Archives General Managers
1	Haluk Pekar (acting)	14 May 1985	11 May 1987
1	Prof. Dr. İsmet Miroğlu (acting)	11 May 1987	13 February 1992
1	İsmet Binark	13 February 1992	5 August 1997
1	İsa Özkul	5 August 1997	8 September 2000
1	Prof. Dr. Yusuf Sarinay	8 September 2000	5 January 2012
1	Prof. Dr. Uğur Ünal	5 January 2012	10 July 2018
State Archives President
1	Prof. Dr. Uğur Ünal	8 August 2018	Incumbent
