= Tomb of Hayreddin Barbarossa =

Mausoleum in Turkey

- Barbaros Hayreddin Paşa Türbesi
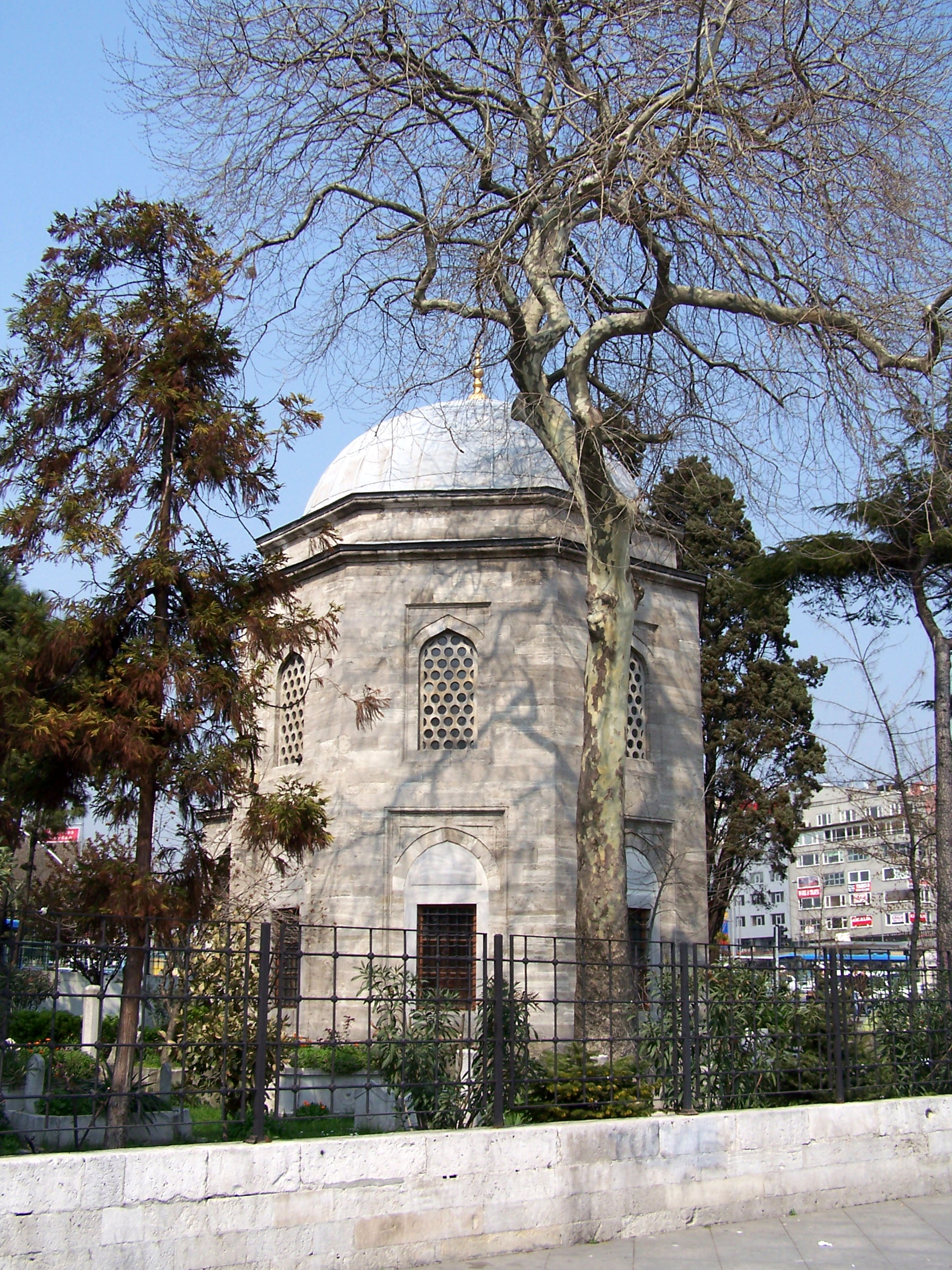
- Interactive map of Tomb of Hayreddin Barbarossa
- Location: Beşiktaş, Istanbul
- Coordinates: 41°02′31″N 29°00′25″E
- Designer: Mimar Sinan
- Completion date: 1541

The tomb of Hayreddin Barbarossa (Turkish: Barbaros Hayreddin Paşa Türbesi) is the final resting place of Ottoman admiral of the fleet Hayreddin Barbarossa whose naval victories secured Ottoman dominance over the Mediterranean during the mid 16th century.

The mausoleum was designed and built by Ottoman architect Mimar Sinan in 1541 and still retains its original features.

It is located near the ferry port of the district of Beşiktaş on the European side of Istanbul where his fleet used to assemble. There is also Istanbul Naval Museum and Barbaros Monument in the same square with tomb. The building also marks the starting point of Barbaros Boulevard.

The Ottoman Navy used to visit the mausoleum and conduct ceremonies and offerings before major expeditions. Today, similarly, Turkish Navy has this tradition also.

The tomb is open to public only in special occasions like July 1, for the Cabotage Festival, and on April 4, for the Memorial Day of Naval Martyrs.

== See also ==
- Hayreddin Barbarossa
- Mimar Sinan
