= Alhucemas Islands =

Island group

Disputed island Islas Alhucemas
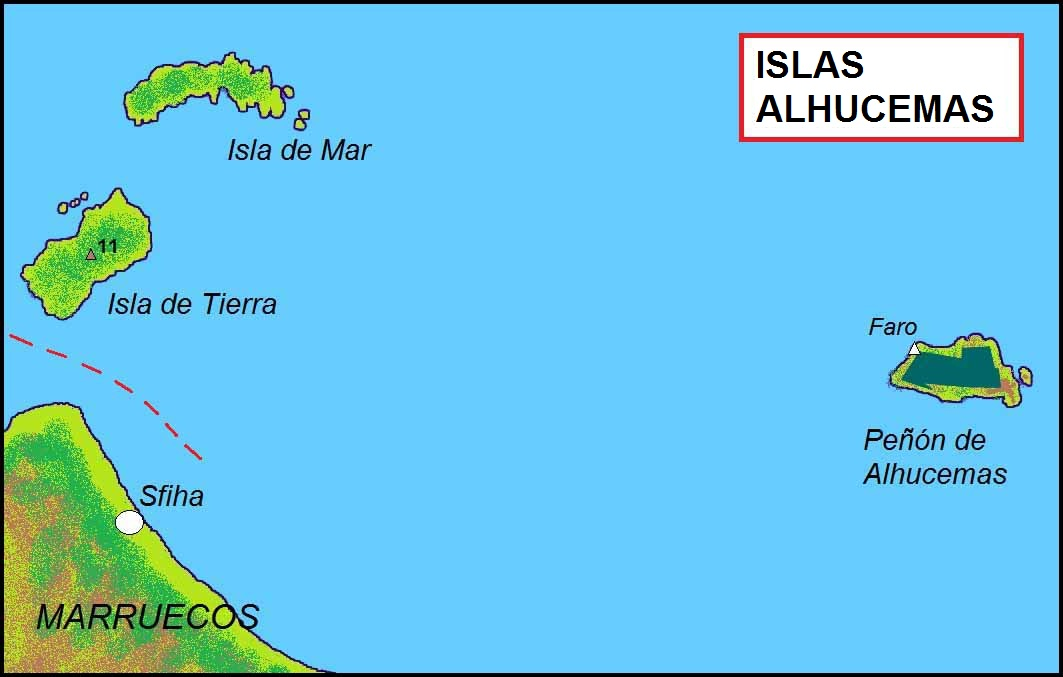
- Map of the Ahucemas Islands
- Interactive map of Alhucemas Islands

Geography
- Location: Alboran Sea
- Coordinates: 35.215°N 3.896°W
- Total islands: 3
- Area: 0.046 km^{2} (0.018 sq mi)
- Highest elevation: 27 m (89 ft)

Administration
- Spain since 1560

Claimed by
- Morocco

Demographics
- Population: RAMIX-32 garrison
- Languages: Spanish
- Ethnic groups: Spaniards

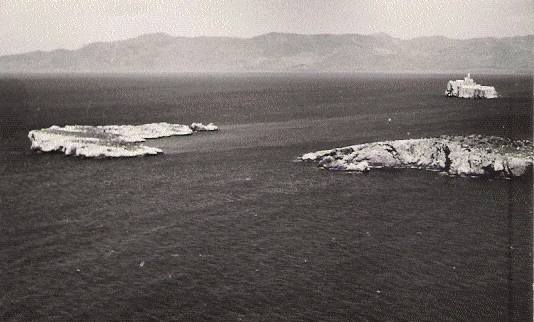
The Alhucemas Islands, c. 1950s

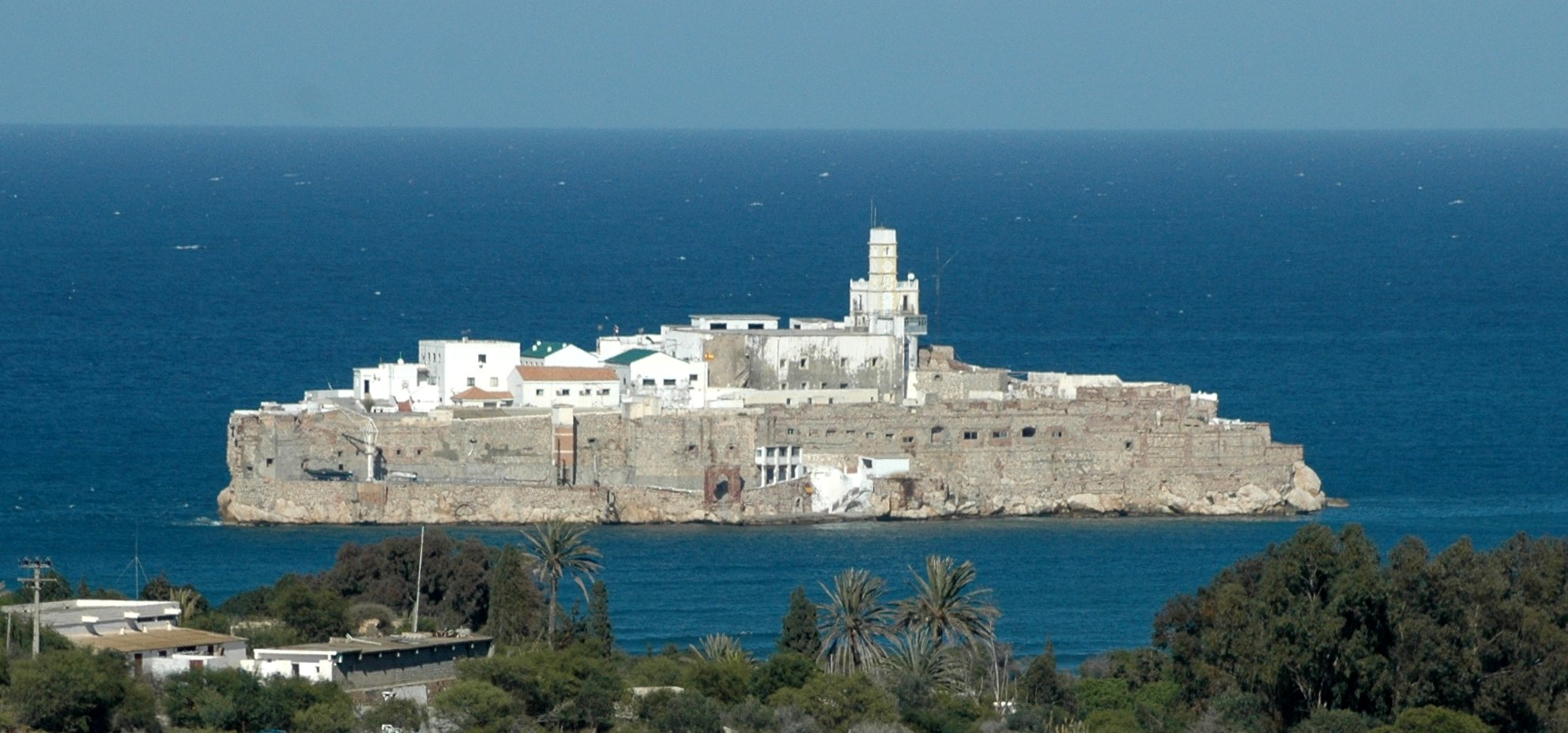
Peñón de Alhucemas, viewed from the Moroccan coast

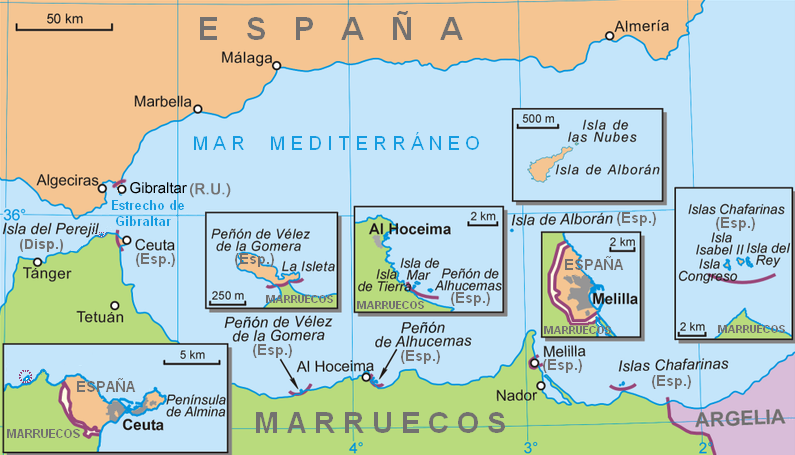
Spanish possessions in North Africa

The Alhucemas Islands (Spanish: Islas Alhucemas, Arabic: جزر الحسيمة) are a group of three islets under Spanish sovereignty located in the Bay of Al Hoceima, in the Alboran Sea of the western Mediterranean Sea. They have historically been classified as "minor places of sovereignty" within the plazas de soberanía.

The islands are part of Spain's Plazas de soberanía and is under Spanish administration, however they are also claimed by Morocco as part of its territory alongside other Spanish territories in Northern Africa.

== Overview ==
Peñón de Alhucemas, together with the islets of Isla de Mar and Isla de Tierra slightly to the west, form the Alhucemas Islands. They are located 300 metres (984 feet) off the coast just south of the Moroccan town of Al Hoceima, or Alhucemas (former Villa Sanjurjo), 146 km (91 miles) east of Ceuta and 84 km (52 miles) west of Melilla. The aggregate land area of the group of three islands is 4.6 ha or 0.046 square kilometres (0.018 sq mi).

- Peñón de Alhucemas (Spanish pronunciation: [peˈɲon de aluˈθemas], "Lavender Rock", (Tarifit: Taẓrut n Nkur, Arabic: حجرة النكور) 35.2135°N 3.8895°W) is a tiny rock island, measuring 220 m (722 ft) east-west and up to 84 m (276 ft) north-south, with an area 1.5 ha or 0.015 km^{2} (0.006 sq mi), and a height of 27 m (89 ft). The rock is entirely occupied by a fort, several houses, and a church. It is one of several peñones, or rock-fortresses, off the coast of Northern Africa.
- Isla de Tierra (35.2152°N 3.9026°W) is a steep, 11 m (36 ft) high rocky platform, 114 m (374 ft) north of the Moroccan beach, 192 m (630 ft) long northeast–southwest, and up to 87 m (285 ft) wide, yielding an area of 1.7 ha or 0.017 km^{2} (0.007 sq mi).
- Isla de Mar (35.2176°N 3.9008°W) is a flat, 4 m (13 ft) high islet, with its western end 93 m (305 ft) north of Isla de Tierra, 245 m (804 ft) long east–west, up to 70 m (230 ft) wide, yielding an area of 1.4 ha or 0.014 km^{2} (0.005 sq mi).

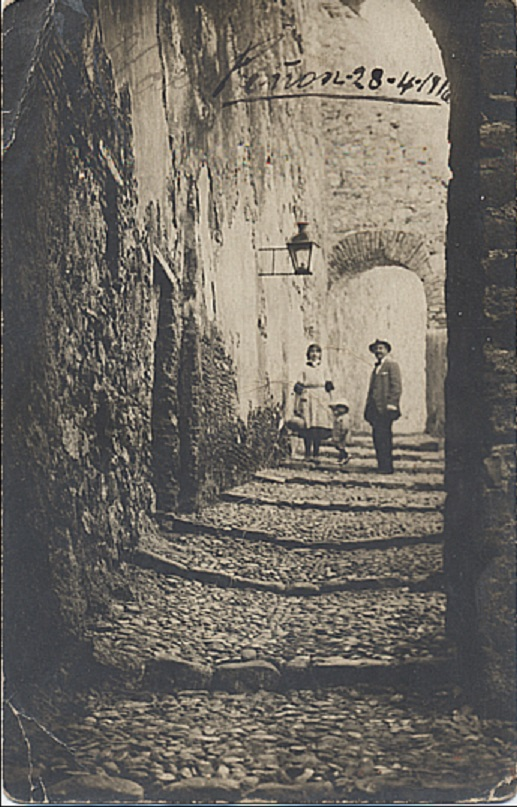
Spanish family on a street of the peñón c. 1915

Spanish rule dates back to 1559, when the Saadis ceded several territories to Spain in exchange for Spanish help against Ottoman armies. In 1673, Spain sent a garrison to the island of Peñón de Alhucemas, and has permanently occupied it since then. The islands are also located near the landing place the Spanish and French expeditionary forces used in 1925 during the Rif War. Morocco has contested Spanish sovereignty over the islets since Morocco received its independence in 1956.

In 2012 the Spanish military garrison in the fort on Peñón de Alhucemas comprised an infantry section of 25–30 men from the 32nd Mixed Artillery Regiment, plus personnel from the marine services with an inflatable boat for reaching supply vessels.

On 29 August 2012, 19 sub-Saharan immigrants traversed the short expanse of water between Morocco and the Isla de Tierra. These individuals camped on the island, hoping to somehow gain access to the Spanish mainland. They were shortly joined by an additional 68 immigrants on 2 September 2012. Refugees and illegal immigration from sub-Saharan nations have been a problem that Spain, and the European Union as a whole, has been trying to solve. Since the islets had an "undefined internal status", the immigrants did not benefit from the Spanish immigration laws and, under a joint operation, Spanish troops tended to the women, children, and medical needs of the immigrants, then turned them back over to Morocco. Moroccan forces promptly deported the individuals across the Algerian border. The Spanish Army has since stationed a small camp on the Isla de Tierra to discourage new attempts to illegally cross into Spanish territory. The handling and deportation of these individuals have been criticized by the Ombudsman of the Spanish Parliament, the Defensor del Pueblo, and by various NGOs and organizations.

== See also ==
- Plazas de soberanía
- List of Spanish colonial wars in Morocco
- Spanish Protectorate of Morocco
