= Yakup Ağa =

Father of the Barbarossa Brothers, Oruç and Hızır

Yakup Ağa (Ottoman Turkish: یعقوب آغا) or Ebu Yusuf Nurullah Yakub (Ottoman Turkish: ابو یوسف نورالله یعقوب), was the father of the Barbarossa Brothers, Oruç and Hızır. He was a Sipahi of Turkish or Albanian descent from Yenice (modern Greek city of Yanitsa). Yakup was among those who took part in the capture of the Aegean island of Lesbos from the Genoese on behalf of the Ottomans in 1462. For his participation he was granted the fief of Bonova village of the island as a reward and the title of the village's Agha (master).

In Lesbos Yakup married a local Christian Greek woman from Mytilene, the widow of an Eastern Orthodox priest named Katerina. From that union two daughters and four sons were born: Ishak, Oruç, Hızır and Ilyas. Yakup became an established potter and purchased a boat to trade his products. The four sons helped their father with his business, but not much is known about his daughters.

At first, Ishak, the eldest son, was involved with the financial affairs of the family business and remained on Mytilene. Hızır operated in the Aegean Sea and based his operations mostly in Thessaloniki. The other two brothers Oruç and Ilyas soon became seamen engaging in sea trade, later turning privateers in the Mediterranean. When their vessel was captured by a Knights of St. John galley, Ilyas was killed during the battle and Oruç became a slave aboard the galley for two to three years. When he regained his freedom, he and his brother Hızir started engaging in piracy as corsairs entering history as the Barbarossa Brothers. They took part in many Ottoman campaigns around the Mediterranean and gained fame for their skill as commanders. Oruç and Ishak were killed in Oran (Algeria) during the battle for Tlemcen (Algeria) fighting the Spaniards. The last surviving son Hızır became one of the most famous Barbary pirates of his era and a legendary figure as Admiral of the Ottoman navy.
