= Peñón =

Offshore rocky island forts established by the Spanish Empire

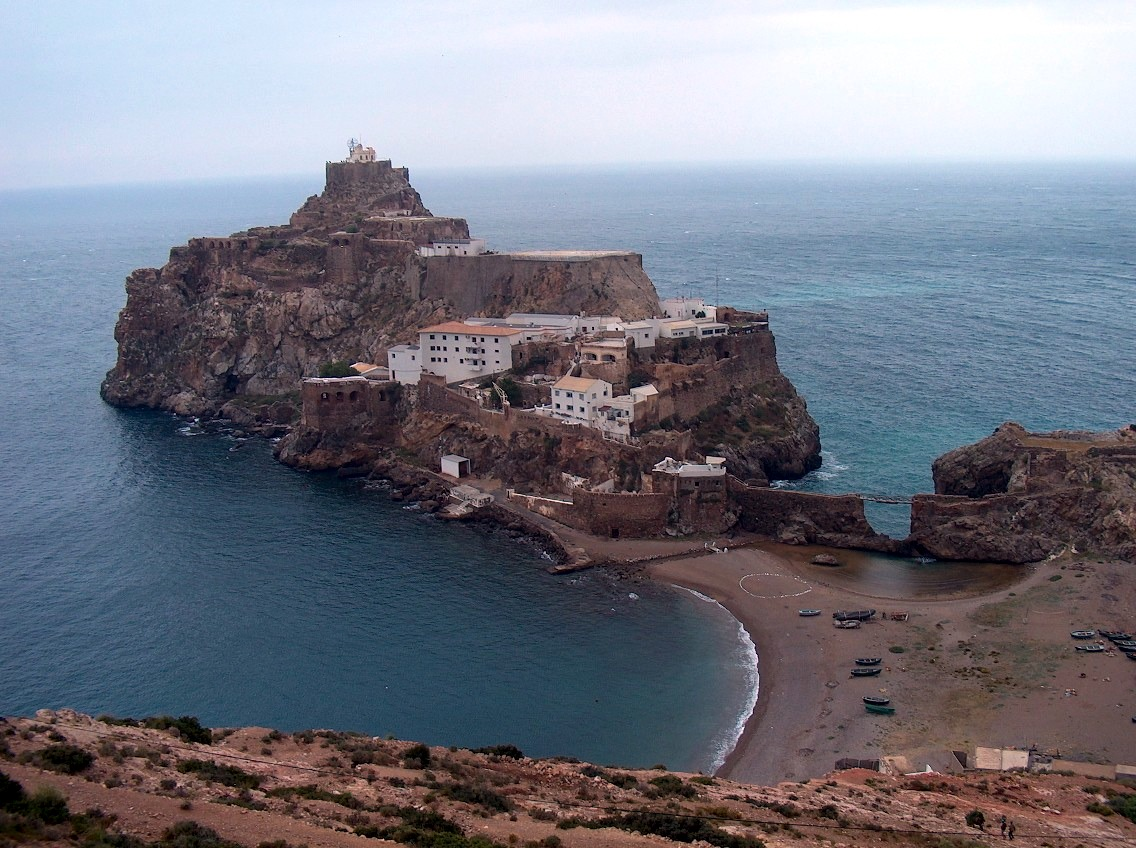
Peñón de Vélez de la Gomera, seen from the Moroccan coast.

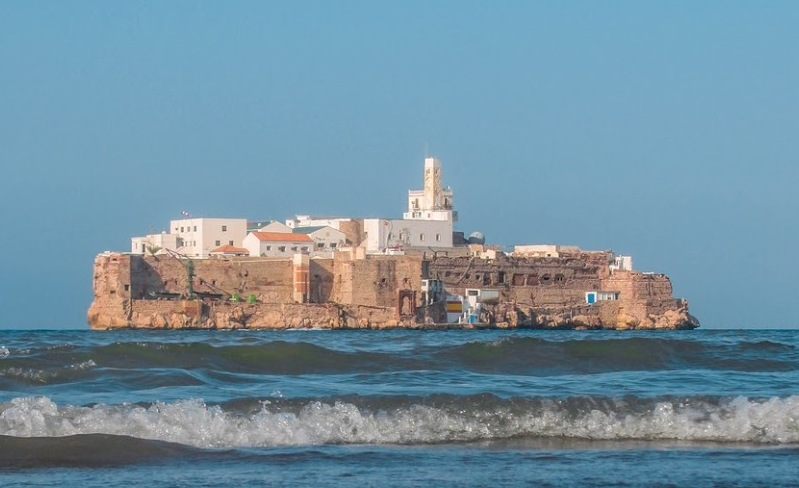
Peñón de Alhucemas, viewed from the Moroccan coast.

A peñón (Spanish pronunciation: [peˈɲon], "rock", pl. peñones) is a term for certain offshore rocky island forts established by the Spanish Empire (especially in Africa). Several are still part of the plazas de soberanía ("places of sovereignty") of Spain in Northern Africa.

== Quick facts ==
A peñón is as a mountain surrounded by water, usually by the sea. Among the most famous is the Peñón de Vélez de la Gomera, off the coast of Morocco, still a Spanish territory to this day. There is also the Peñón de Alhucemas nearby. The Peñón of Algiers (Peñón de Argel) was established in 1510, when the Spaniards settled on a small island in front of Algiers (modern Algeria), and forced the local ruler Sālim al-Tūmī (Selim-bin-Teumi) to accept their presence through a treaty and pay tribute.

== List of peñones ==
- Peñón de Ifach
- Peñón de Alhucemas
- Peñón de Argel
- Peñón de Gibraltar (Rock of Gibraltar)
- Peñón de Vélez de la Gomera
