= İsmet Miroğlu =

Turkish historian

İsmet Miroğlu (1944–1997) was a Turkish academic. He was a full professor at the Department of History of Istanbul University.

Professor Miroğlu was born in the Bayburt province of Turkey. He was a graduate of the Department of History of Istanbul University in 1969 and was recruited as a research assistant within the same department. In 1974 he gained a degree of doctor of history (PhD) by his dissertation titled "The Sandjak of Bayburt in the 16th Century" (16. Yüzyılda Bayburt Sancağı, in Turkish). In 1981, Miroğlu became an associate professor of history by his dissertation on the Sandjak of Kemah. In 1989 he became a full professor.

Between 13 May 1987 and 31 December 1990, Professor İsmet Miroğlu was the Director General of the Turkish State Archives, an institution attached to the Prime Minister's office of the Republic of Turkey. He led the modernization and re-organization of state archives, which cover both the Ottoman and the Republic periods of Turkey.

On 31 December 1990 he left his position at the State Archives and returned to academic life at the Istanbul University. Besides his academic career, he was the founder and consultant of a monthly history journal in Turkish entitled Tarih ve Medeniyet (History and civilization). The first issue of this journal was published in March 1994. He spoke 4 languages including Ottoman Turkish, French, Persian and English.

Professor İsmet Miroğlu died on 23 October 1997, after cancer treatment, in Istanbul.

To keep his memory alive, BKY-Babıali Kültür Yayıncılığı, a publishing house based in Istanbul, published a book on behalf of Miroğlu which is titled Bin Atlının Akınları (Campaigns of 1000 cavaliers). The book contains some short articles of Professor Miroğlu on Ottoman history.
