= Peñón of Algiers =

Former island in Algeria

Coordinates: 36°47′14.05″N 3°4′7.84″E

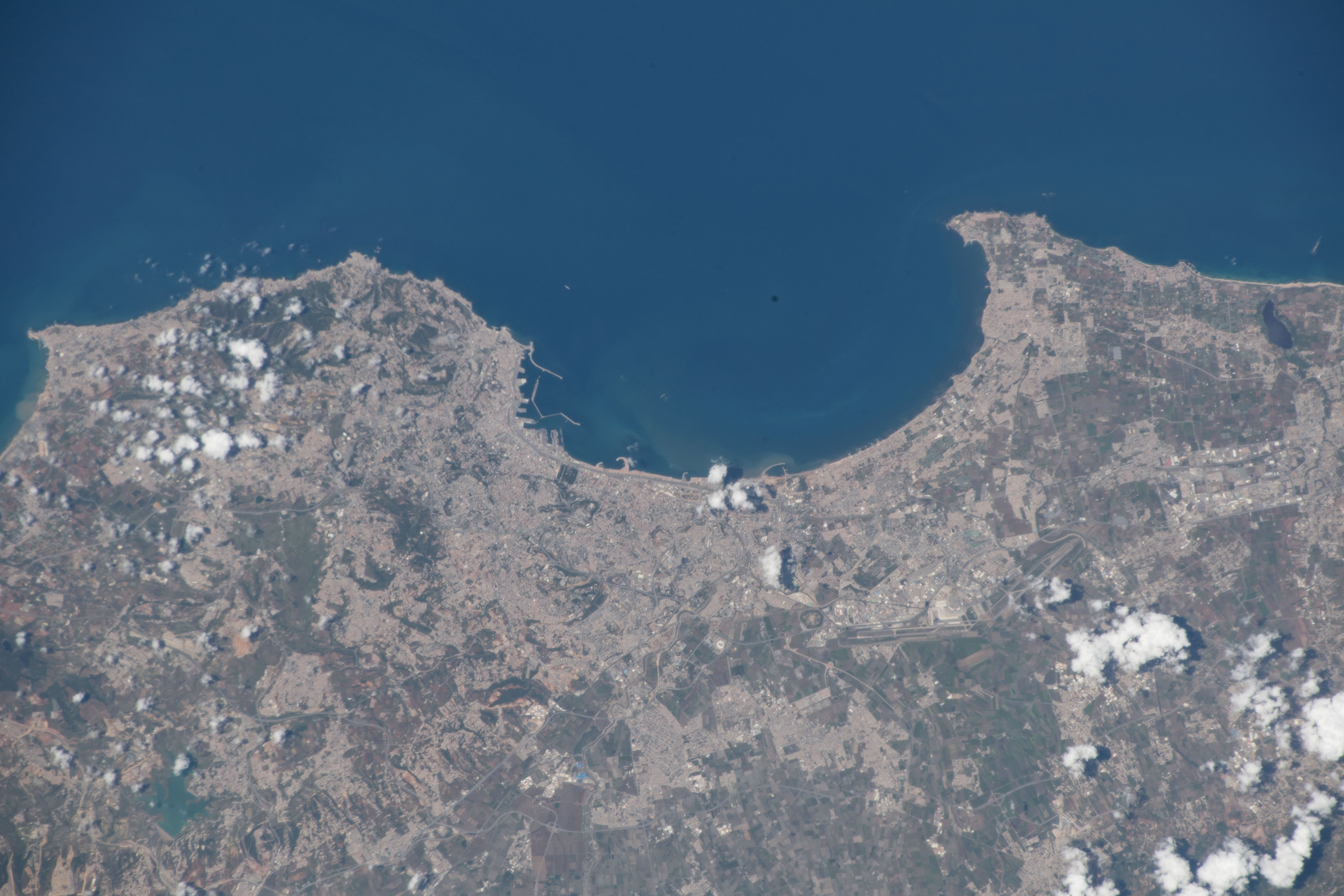
Location of the Peñón of Algiers (in red circle)

Peñón of Algiers (Spanish: Peñón de Argel, Arabic: حصن الصخرة, romanized: ḥiṣn aṣ-ṣaḵra) was a small islet off the coast of Algiers, fortified by the Kingdom of Spain, during the 16th century. The former islet has since been connected to the African continent to form a seawall and the harbour of Algiers.

== History ==
Algiers islets

In 1510 the Spaniards settled on a small island, the Peñón, north of Algiers (in modern Algeria). They forced Sālim al-Tūmī (Selim-bin-Teumi) to observe the terms of a treaty with Spain, namely, to accept a Spanish presence and to pay tribute. Fortifications were built on the islet, and a garrison of 200 men was established. Sālim al-Tūmī had to go to Spain to take an oath of obedience to Ferdinand of Aragon.

The islet was captured in 1529 by Hayreddin Barbarossa during the Capture of Algiers. Barbarossa dismantled the fortifications, ending the Spanish presence in the area.
