= Babıali Kültür Yayıncılığı =

Publishing company in Istanbul, Turkey

Babıali Kültür Yayıncılığı A.Ş
- Type: Private
- Industry: Media
- Founded: 1999
- Headquarters: Istanbul, Turkey,
- Key people: İsmet Demir (chairman)
- Website: www.bky.com.tr

Babıali Kültür Yayıncılığı (Babiali Cultural Publications in English, abbreviated as BKY) is a publishing company based in Istanbul, Turkey. The company publishes many different kinds of books.

== History ==
Babıali Kültür Yayıncılığı was founded in Istanbul on November 13, 1999 and started to publish books in 2000. It has extended its sphere of activities and brought important books into the Turkish market. Today, it is one of the leading publishing companies in Turkey with popular authors and important books. Until 15 April 2013, Rahîm Er who is the founder of the company was the chairman of the board. Since 15 April 2013, İsmet Demir holds that post.

== Name of the company ==
Babıali Kültür Yayıncılığı means Babıali Cultural Publications. The word Babıali (Ottoman Turkish Bab-ı Âli) which means High Porte used to refer to the Divan (court) of the Ottoman Empire where government policies were established. The particular term was used in the context of diplomacy by the western states, as their diplomats were received at "porte" (meaning gate). This word also refers to the media and publication sector in Turkey since the headquarters of media companies were based in Babıali region of Cağaloğlu until the late 1990s. Today headquarters of Turkish national media companies are based at modern towers and office buildings in İkitelli and Yenibosna, Istanbul. However, Cağaloğlu neighborhood of Eminönü (in Fatih district) which represents Babıali concept is still the center of book publishing sector of Turkey.

== Books ==
In addition to publishing works by prominent Turkish authors, Babıali Kültür Yayıncılığı has also published many well-known books by internationally acclaimed authors, including the following titles::

1. South Beach Diet (Miami Diyeti), Arthur Agatston
2. Un Mensonge Français (Bir Fransız Yalanı), Georges-Marc Benamou
3. Tell No One (Kimseye Söyleme), Harlan Coben
4. Pour Your Heart into It (Gönlünü İşe Vermek), Howard Schultz
5. Hollywood, Le Pengagon et Washington (Hollywood, Pentagon ve Washington), Jean-Michel Valantin
6. Stupid White Men (Aptal Beyaz Adamlar), Michael Moore
7. Dude, Where's My Country?, (Ahbap, Memleketim Nerede?), Michael Moore

== Authors ==
Today Babıali Kültür Yayıncılığı has many famous authors, including but not limited to the following names:

1. Adeline Yen Mah
2. Alphonse de Lamartine
3. Arthur Agatston
4. Bartalomé de Las Casas
5. Gabriel Domergue
6. Georges-Marc Benamou
7. Harlan Coben
8. Howard Schultz
9. Iris Johansen
10. İsmet Miroğlu
11. Jean-Michel Valantin
12. John Adair
13. Maria Orsini Natale
14. Michael Moore
15. Mikhail Gorbachev
16. Mahir Kaynak
17. Yusuf Halaçoğlu
18. Rahîm Er
19. Tzvetan Todorov
20. Yılmaz Öztuna

== Haber Kuşağı (haberkusagi.com) ==
Besides publishing books, Babıali Kültür Yayıncılığı was also publishing Haber Kuşağı (haberkusagi.com) a democrat online newspaper in Turkish, founded on 2 February 2005, suspended itself on 15 April 2013. Haber Kuşağı was covering politics, culture, science, business, and sports, and was naturally updated throughout each day.

Haber Kuşağı used to have several permanent columnists, including academics, former politicians, and some authors of Babıali Kültür Yayıncılığı.

The word "haber" means "news" and "kuşak" means "belt", "generation", "brace", and "zone" in Turkish. "Haber Kuşağı" means "News Zone" and/or "News Flow". It is a trademark of Babıali Kültür Yayıncılığı registered under the Turkish Patent Institute.
