= Siege of Nice =

1543 siege

Coordinates: 43.7°N 7.26667°E

Battle of Nice
- Part of the Italian War of 1542–46
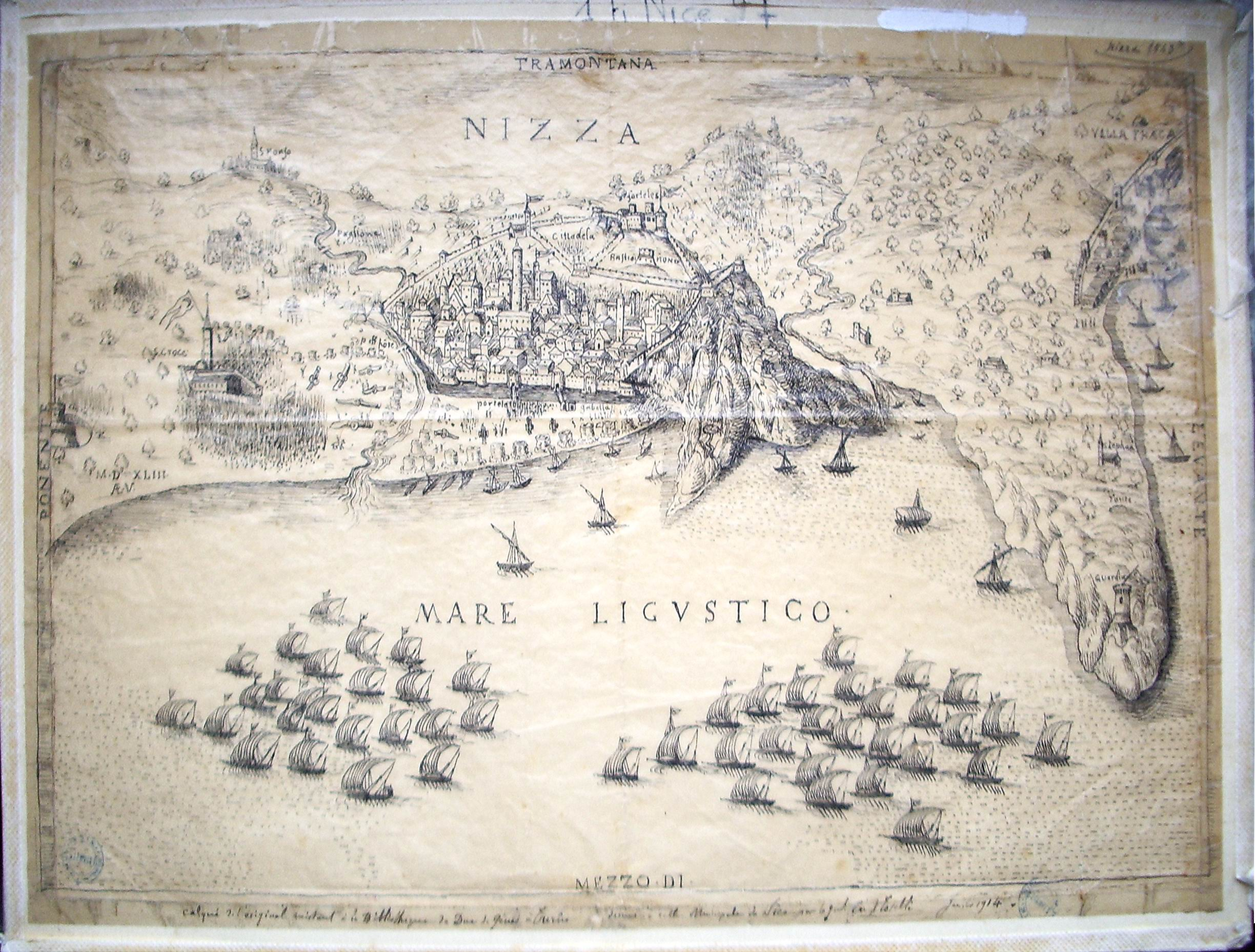
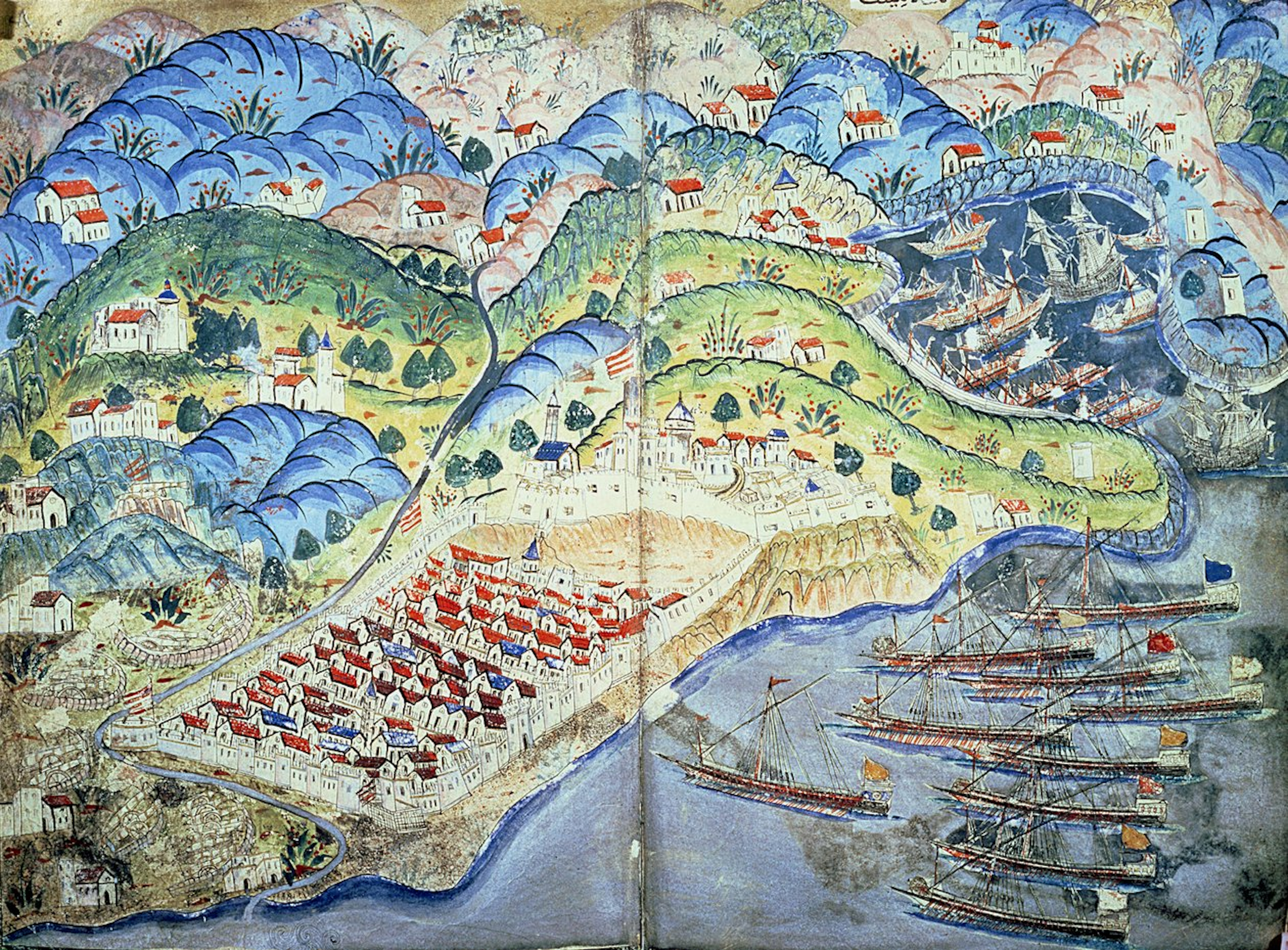
- Top: In the siege of Nice in 1543, a combined Franco-Ottoman force captured the city. Bottom: Ottoman depiction of the siege of Nice by Matrakçı Nasuh.
| Date | 6–22 August 1543 |
| Location | Nice, Savoy |
| Result | Imperial-Savoyard victory |

Belligerents
| Holy Roman Empire; Spain; Savoy; Genoa | Ottoman Empire; France |

Commanders and leaders
| Charles III; Andrea Doria (Spain) Alfonso d'Avalos | Hayreddin Barbarossa; Salah Rais; François de Bourbon |

Strength
| Nice: Unknown; Relief army: 57 galleys 40 carracks | 100 galleys 30,000 soldiers 26 galleys 18 carracks 7,000 soldiers |

Casualties and losses
| Nice: 5,000 captives Relief army: 4 galleys | Unknown |

The siege of Nice occurred in 1543 and was part of the Italian War of 1542–46 in which Francis I and Suleiman the Magnificent collaborated as part of the Franco-Ottoman alliance against the Holy Roman Emperor Charles V, and Henry VIII of England. At that time, Nice was under the control of Charles III, Duke of Savoy, an ally of Charles V.

The siege was part of the 1543–1544 Mediterranean campaign of Hayreddin Barbarossa. A Franco-Ottoman army besieged Nice, breaching the walls and conquering sections of the city, but ultimately retired before taking the citadel due to the arrival of a Imperial-Savoyard relief fleet under Andrea Doria. Nice remained thus in Savoyard hands.

== Background ==
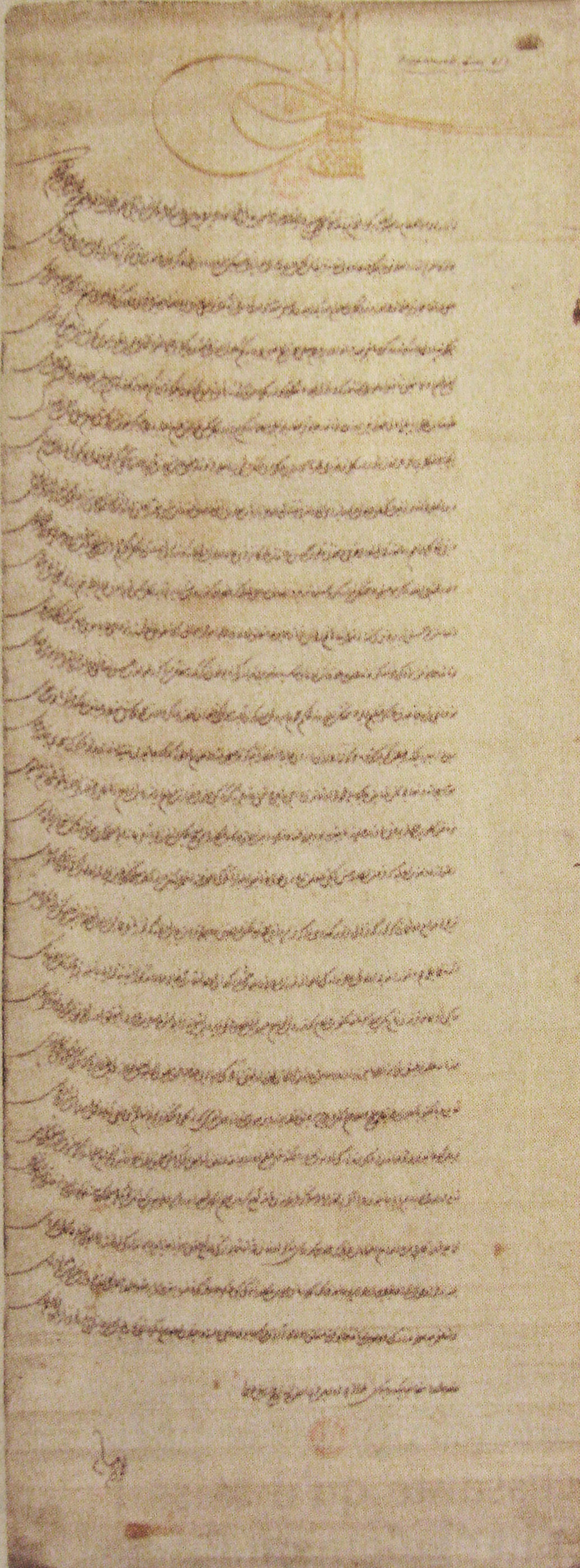
Letter of Suleiman to Francis I about the plans for the siege of Nice, written in mid-February 1543

In the Mediterranean, active naval collaboration took place between France and the Ottoman Empire to fight against Spanish forces. Following an agreement between Francis I and Suleyman the Magnificent, through the intervention of the French ambassador in Constantinople, Antoine Escalin des Aimars, best known as Capitan Polin, a fleet of 110 galleys and 50 galiots under Hayreddin Barbarossa left from the Sea of Marmara in mid-May 1543. He then raided the coasts of Sicily and Southern Italy through the month of June, anchoring in front of Rome at the mouth of the Tiber on 29 June, while Polin wrote reassurances that attacks against Rome would not take place.

Barbarossa arrived with his fleet, accompanied by Polin, at Île Saint-Honorat on 5 July. As almost nothing had been prepared on the French side to assist the Ottoman fleet, Polin was dispatched to meet with Francis I at Marolles and ask him for support. Meanwhile, Barbarossa went to the harbour of Toulon on 10 July and then was received with honours at the harbour of Marseille on 21 July, where he joined the French forces under the Governor of Marseille, François of Bourbon, Count of Enghien. Barbarossa had originally intended to disembark in Spain, but it was prevented by their failure at besieging Perpignan and the presence of the imperial fleet under Andrea Doria in the gulf of Roses. Charles V had previously gathered 57 galleys and 40 carracks in Genoa for the occasion.

Franco-Ottoman attention turned towards the Duchy of Savoy, of which Nice was a part. Although Savoy had been a French protectorate for a century, Francis I chose to attack it because Charles III, Duke of Savoy had angered him by marrying Beatrice of Portugal, thus becoming an ally of the Habsburgs. Before Barbarossa's arrival, François de Bourbon had already attempted to make a surprise attack on Nice with ten galleys from Marseille, but had been repulsed by Doria coming with 44 galleys of his own, with four French vessels being captured. In order to besiege the city, Bourbon joined Barbarossa at Marseille in August 1543. Bourbon had reinforced his fleet with 26 galleys and 18 carracks with 7,000 soldiers. The combined fleet sailed out of Marseille on the 5th of August.

== Siege ==
=== Attack on the city ===
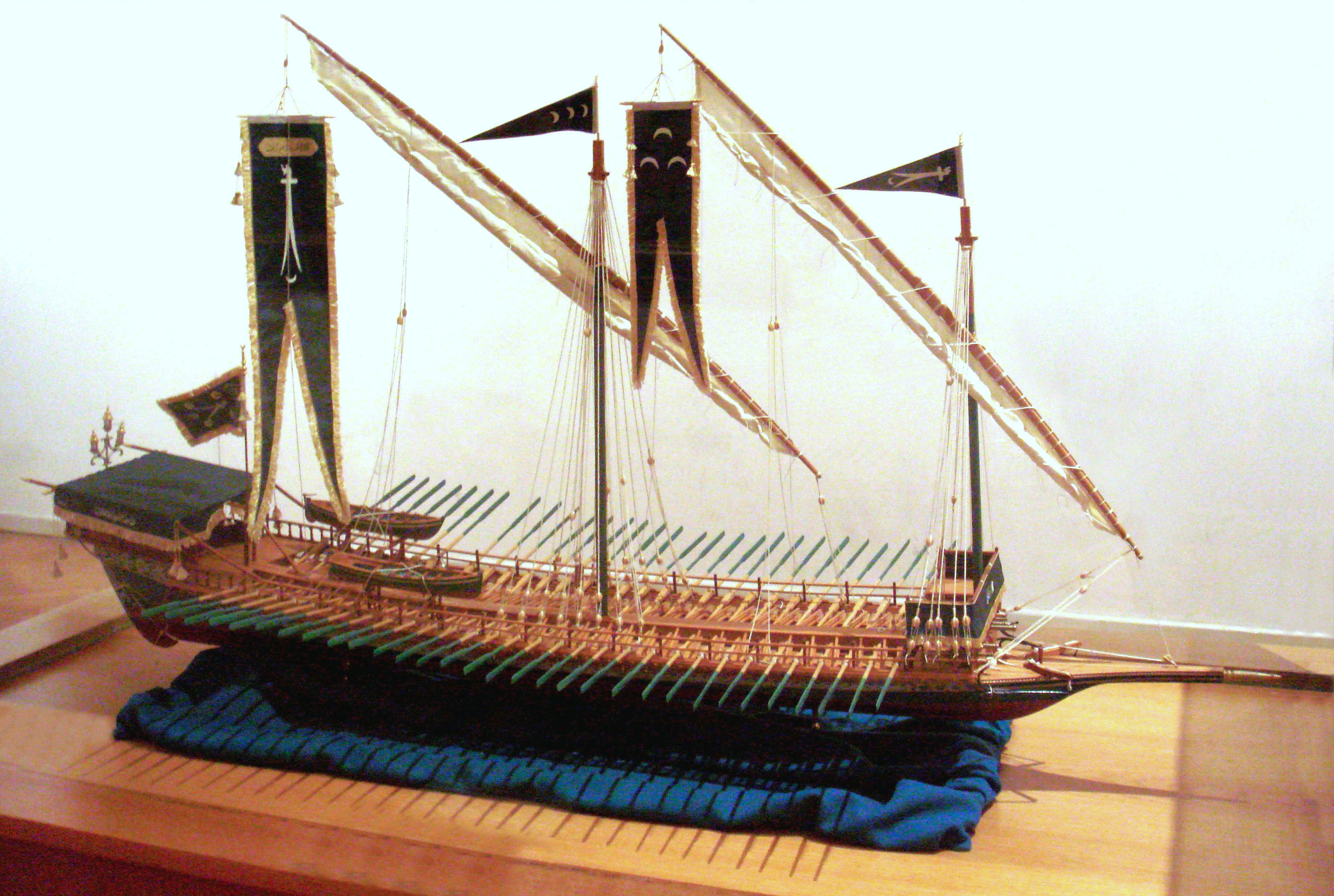
Barbarossa's galley during his campaign in France, 1543

The Ottoman force first landed at Villefranche, 6 kilometers east of Nice, which it took and destroyed. The French and Ottoman forces then collaborated to attack the city of Nice on 6 August 1543.

The Franco-Ottomans were confronted by a stiff resistance which gave rise to the story of Catherine Ségurane, culminating with a major battle on 15 August, but the city surrendered on 22 August. The French prevented the Ottomans from sacking the city. They could not however take the castle, the "Château de Cimiez", apparently because the French were unable to supply sufficient gunpowder to their Ottoman allies. During the campaign, Barbarossa is known to have complained about the state of the French ships and the inappropriateness of their equipment and stores. He famously said "Are you seamen to fill your casks with wine rather than powder?".

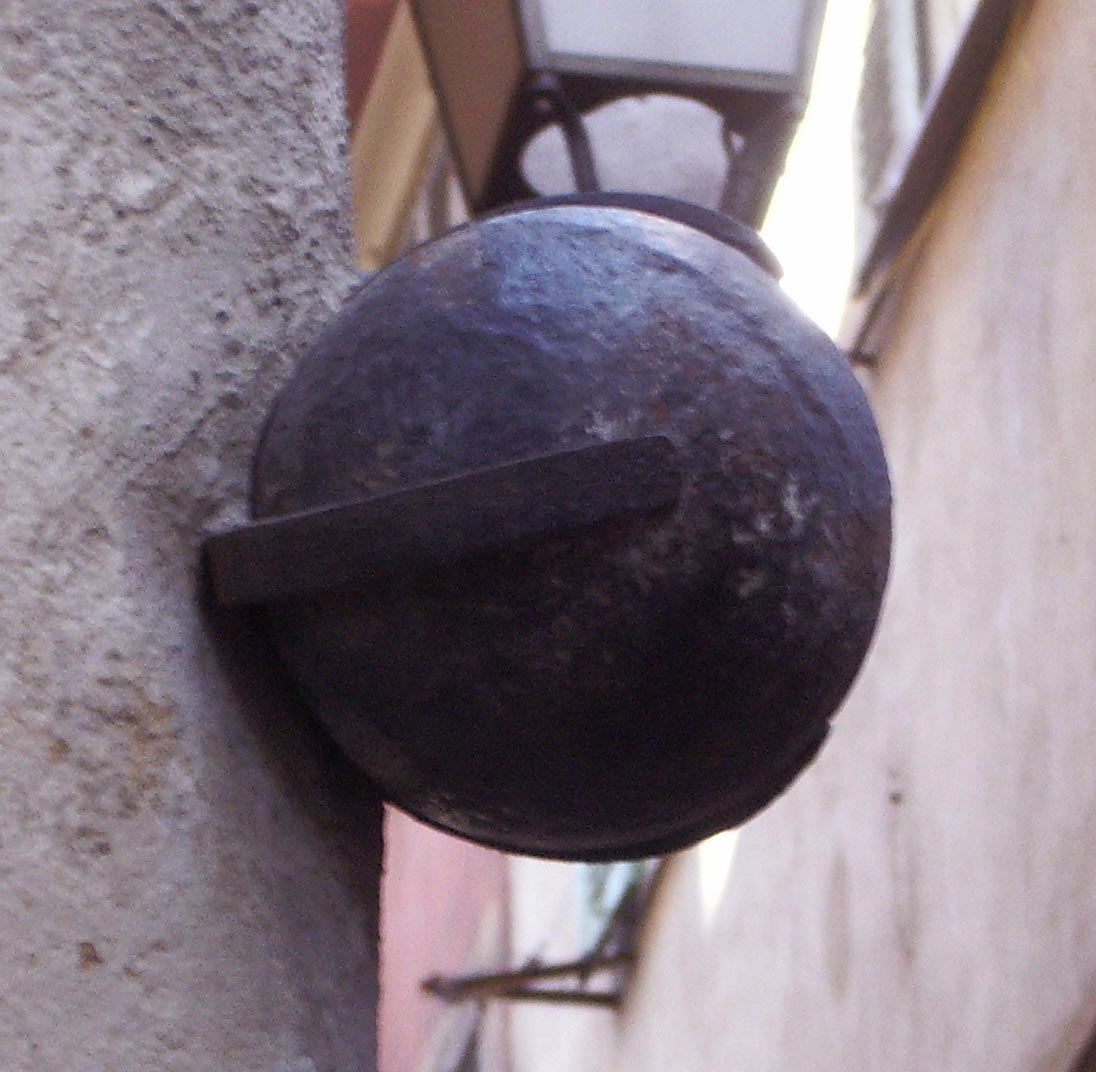
A cannonball fired by the Turkish fleet, now at the corner of "Catherine Ségurane" street, or "Rue Droite", in Nice. A plaque reads: "Cannonball from the Turkish fleet in 1543 during the siege of Nice, where Catherine Ségurane, heroine of Nice, distinguished herself."

Another important battle against the castle took place on 8 September, but the force finally retreated upon learning that an Imperial army was on the move to meet them: Duke Charles III, ruler of the Duchy of Savoy, had raised an army in Piedmont to free the city.

=== Arrival of the relief force ===
Barbarossa withdrew his fleet a few hours before the arrival of a Spanish-Italian relief fleet led by Andrea Doria, carrying a contingent of tercios under Alfonso D'Avalos and the army of Charles III of Savoy. Although he lost four galleys in a storm before landing, Doria bombarded the French positions in Villefranche before disembarking D'Avalos, who successfully made its way to the Nice citadel.

Barbarossa displayed great reluctance to attack Doria after the latter was put in difficulty by the weather. It was suggested that there was some tacit agreement between Barbarossa and Doria, especially as Barbarossa had been for a long time in negotiations with the emperor to potentially change sides. However, Doria's losses during the storm had been small and his fleet was still dangerous at the moment of Barbarossa's retreat.

Some sources say that the last night before leaving, Barbarossa plundered the city, burned parts of it, and took 5,000 captives. However, Spanish accounts are unanimous that it was the French who burned the town, and Sir Godfrey Fisher quotes the French Marshal Vieilleville as saying: “The town of Nice was sacked in defiance of the capitulation terms, and it was then burned. But for this one must not blame Barbarossa and his troops, for they were already far off when this happened… This was put upon the unfortunate Barbarossa in order to uphold the honour and reputation of France, indeed Christendom itself.”

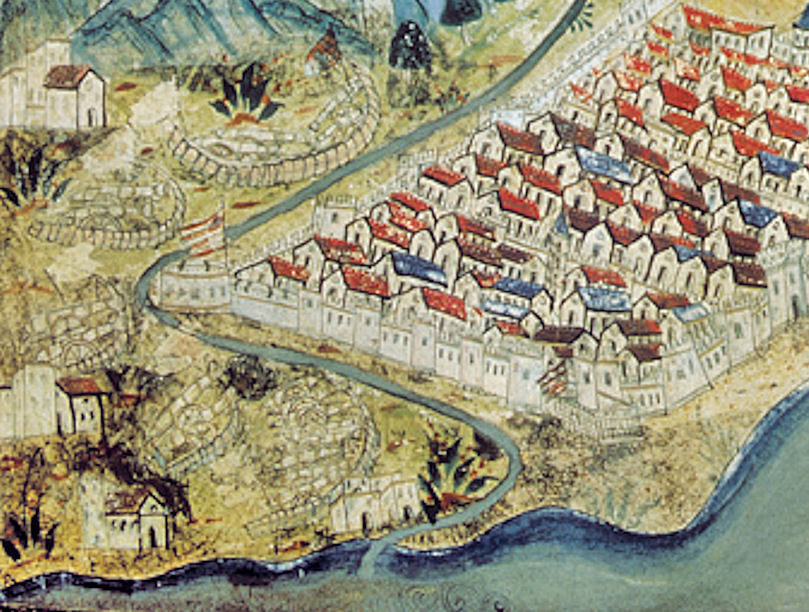
French royal artillery (white flags, left) besieging Nice

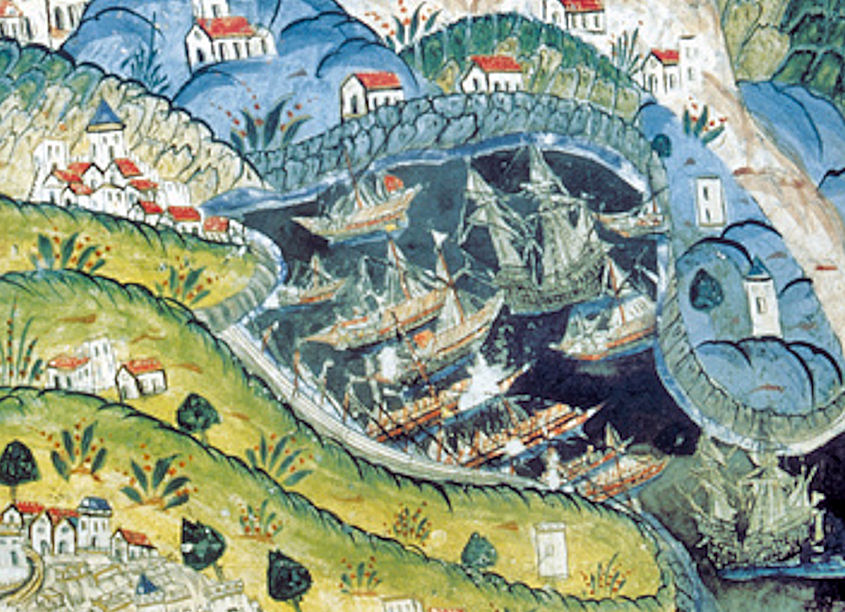
Ottoman landing in Villefranche

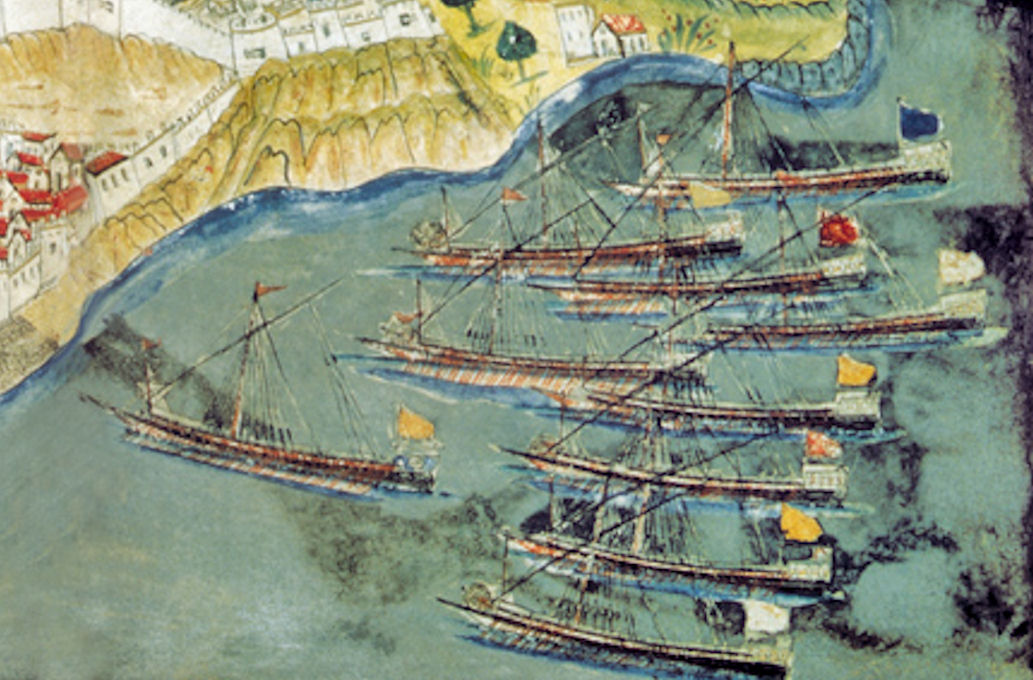
Main landing at Nice

== Aftermath ==
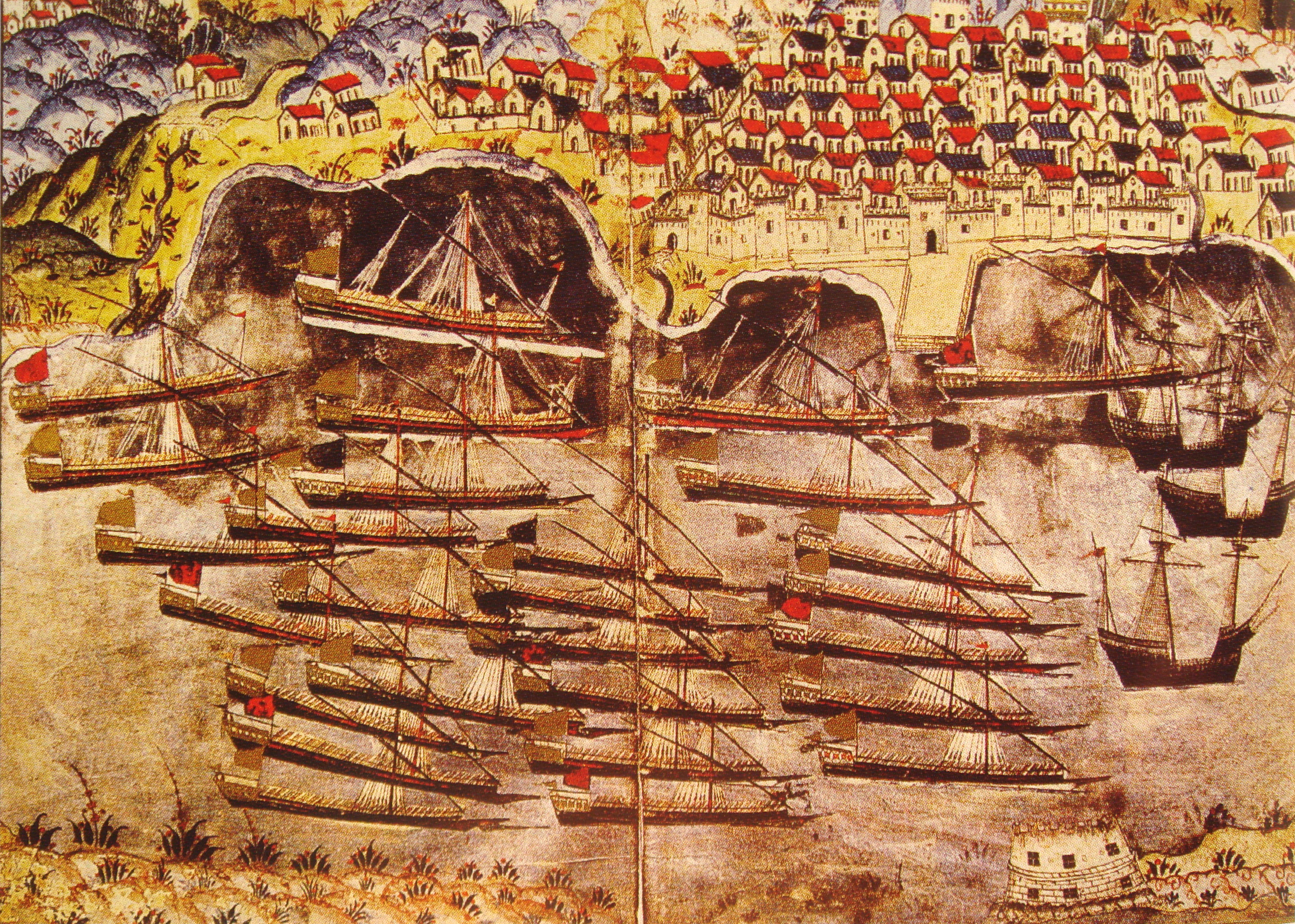
Barbarossa's fleet wintering in the French harbour of Toulon, 1543

Following the siege, the Ottomans were offered by Francis to winter at Toulon, so that they could continue to harass the Holy Roman Empire, and especially the coast of Spain and Italy, as well the communications between the two countries. Barbarossa was also promised that he would receive help from the French in reconquering Tunis if he stayed through the winter in France. The prisoners taken in Villefranche he sent to Constantinople in three carracks and a galiot, although the fleet was caught on route and captured by García de Toledo and Giannettino Doria.

Throughout the winter, the Ottoman fleet, with its 110 galleys and 30,000 troops, was able to use Toulon as a base to attack the Spanish and Italian coasts under Admiral Salah Rais. They raided Barcelona in Spain, and Sanremo, Borghetto Santo Spirito, Ceriale in Italy, and defeated Italo-Spanish naval attacks. Sailing with his whole fleet to Genoa, Barbarossa negotiated with Andrea Doria the release of Turgut Reis. France provided about 10,000,000 kilograms of bread to supply the Ottoman army during the 6 months it stayed in Toulon, and for the provisioning of the following summer's campaign and return to Constantinople.

It seems the involvement of Francis I to this joint effort with the Ottomans were rather half-hearted however, as many European powers were complaining about such an alliance against another Christian power. Relations remained tensed and suspicious between the two allies.

Fort Mont Alban was built by Duke Emmanuel Philibert to reinforce coastal defenses following the siege of Nice.

A French-Habsburg peace treaty was finally signed at Crépy on 18 September 1544, and a truce was signed between the Habsburg and the Ottomans on 10 November 1545. The Habsburg emperor Charles V agreed to recognize the new Ottoman conquests. A formal peace treaty was signed on 13 June 1547, after the death of Francis I.

A local consequence of the siege was the reinforcement of the coast with defensive fortifications, especially the castle of Nice and the Fort du mont Alban, and the fort of Saint-Elme de Villefranche.

== Legacy ==
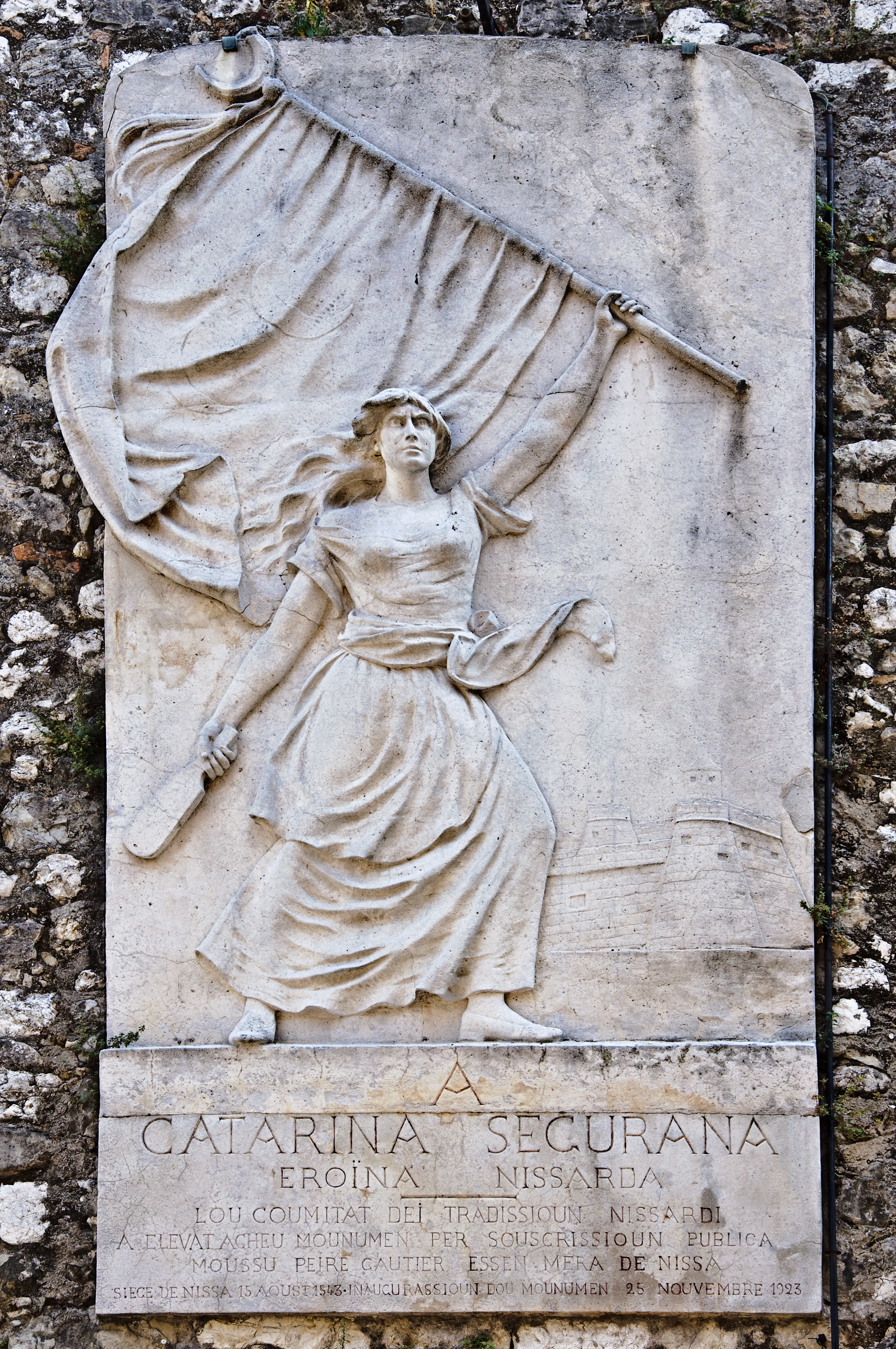
Memorial in bas-relief to Catherine Ségurane.

Catherine Ségurane (Catarina Ségurana in the Niçard dialect of Provençal) is a folk heroine of Nice said to have played a decisive role in repelling the city's siege by Turkish invaders allied with Francis I, the siege of Nice, in the summer of 1543. At the time, Nice was part of Savoy, independent from France, and had no standing military to defend it. Most versions of the tale have Catherine Ségurane, a common washerwoman, leading the townspeople into battle. Legend has it that she knocked out a standard-bearer with her beater and took his flag.

Catherine's existence has never been definitively proven, and her heroic act is likely pure fiction or highly exaggerated; Jean Badat, a historian who stood witness to the siege, made no mention of her involvement in the defense. Historically attested defense of Nice include the townspeople's destruction of a key bridge and the arrival of an army mustered by a Savoyard duke, Charles III. Nevertheless, the legend of Catherine Ségurane has excited the local imagination. Louis Andrioli wrote an epic poem about her in 1808, and a play dedicated to her story was written by Jean-Baptiste Toselli in 1878. In 1923, a bas-relief monument to Catherine was erected near the supposed location of her feat. In Nice, Catherine Segurane Day is celebrated annually, concurrent with St. Catherine's Day on 25 November.

== See also ==
- Orientalism in early modern France
