= Castle of Nice =

Fortified structure in Nice, France

Coordinates: 43.6960°N 7.2797°E

The Castle of Nice or Colline du Château was a military citadel. Built at the top of a hill, it stood overlooking the bay of Nice from the 11th century to the 18th century. It was besieged several times, especially in 1543 and in 1691, before it was taken by French troops in 1705 and finally destroyed in 1706 by command of Louis XIV.

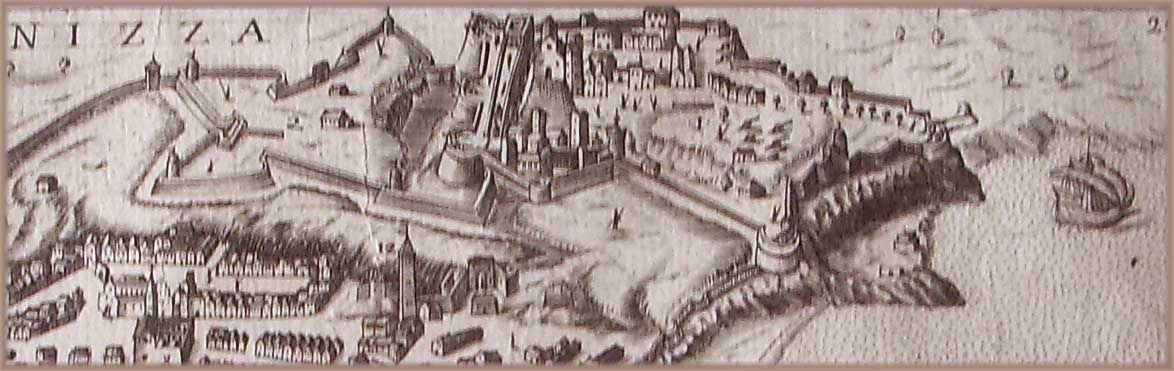
Castle of Nice

Nowadays, Castle Hill is used as a park. It's the most famous public garden in Nice, and a "must see" place for the numerous tourists who visit the city. It offers many amazing panoramas and provides a beautiful view all day long from sunrise to sundown, highlighting various landscapes depending on where one looks: the Harbor at sunrise, the Promenade des Anglais at sundown. That's why Castle Hill is called "the cradle of the sun".

== Castle Hill ==
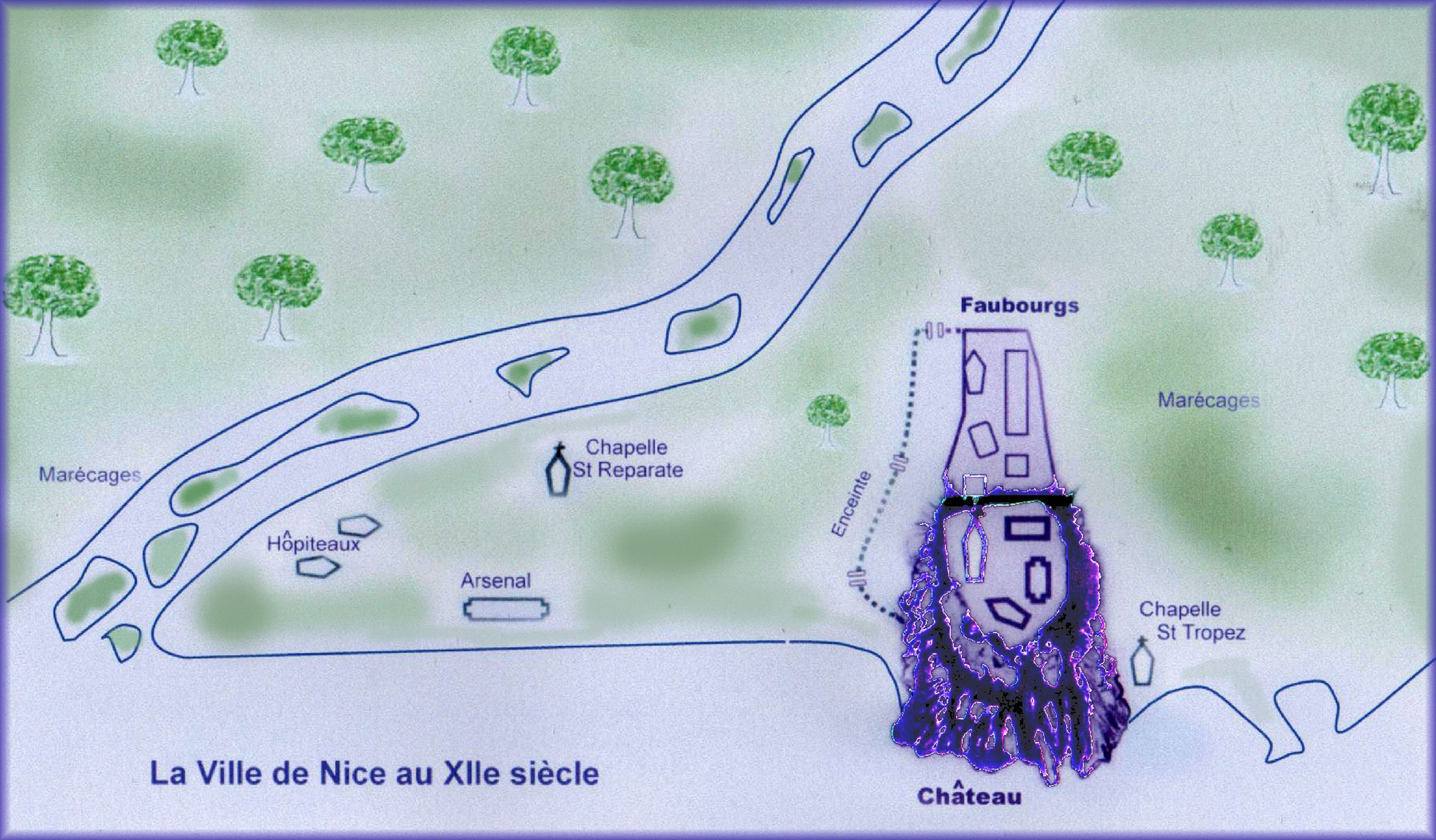
The Castle of Nice during the 12th century

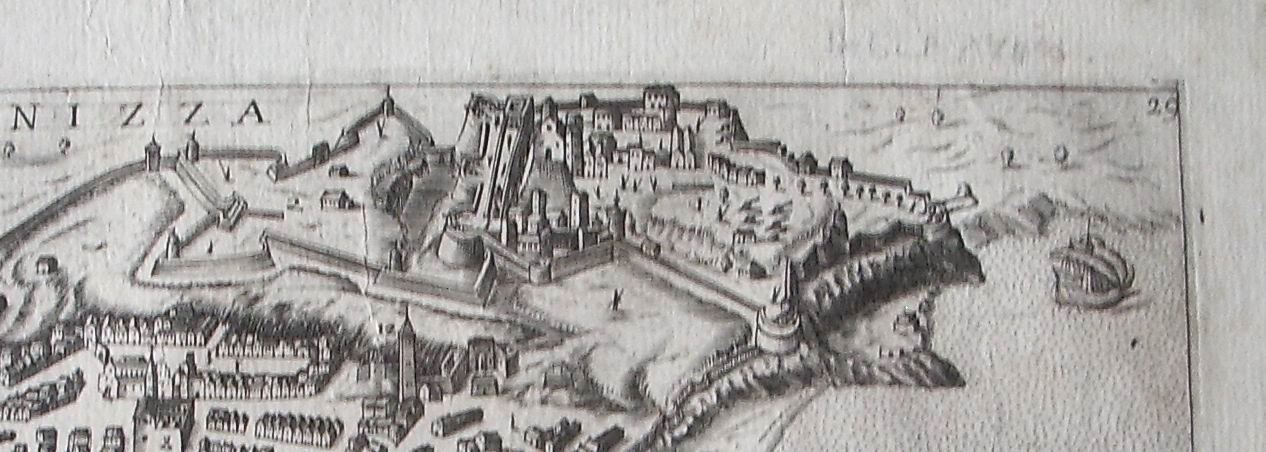
Details of the citadel from a plan of 1625.

In the minds of those who have lived in the city for a long time, the word "Castle" is more likely to be associated with the hill where the heroine Catherine Ségurane distinguished herself or with the perspective of a walk, than with one of the most massively fortified citadels on the Mediterranean Arc. Castle Hill is a big limestone rock 93 meters in height.
