= Matrakçı Nasuh =

Bosnian Ottoman polymath (1480 – c. 1564)

- Matrakčija Nasuh Visočak
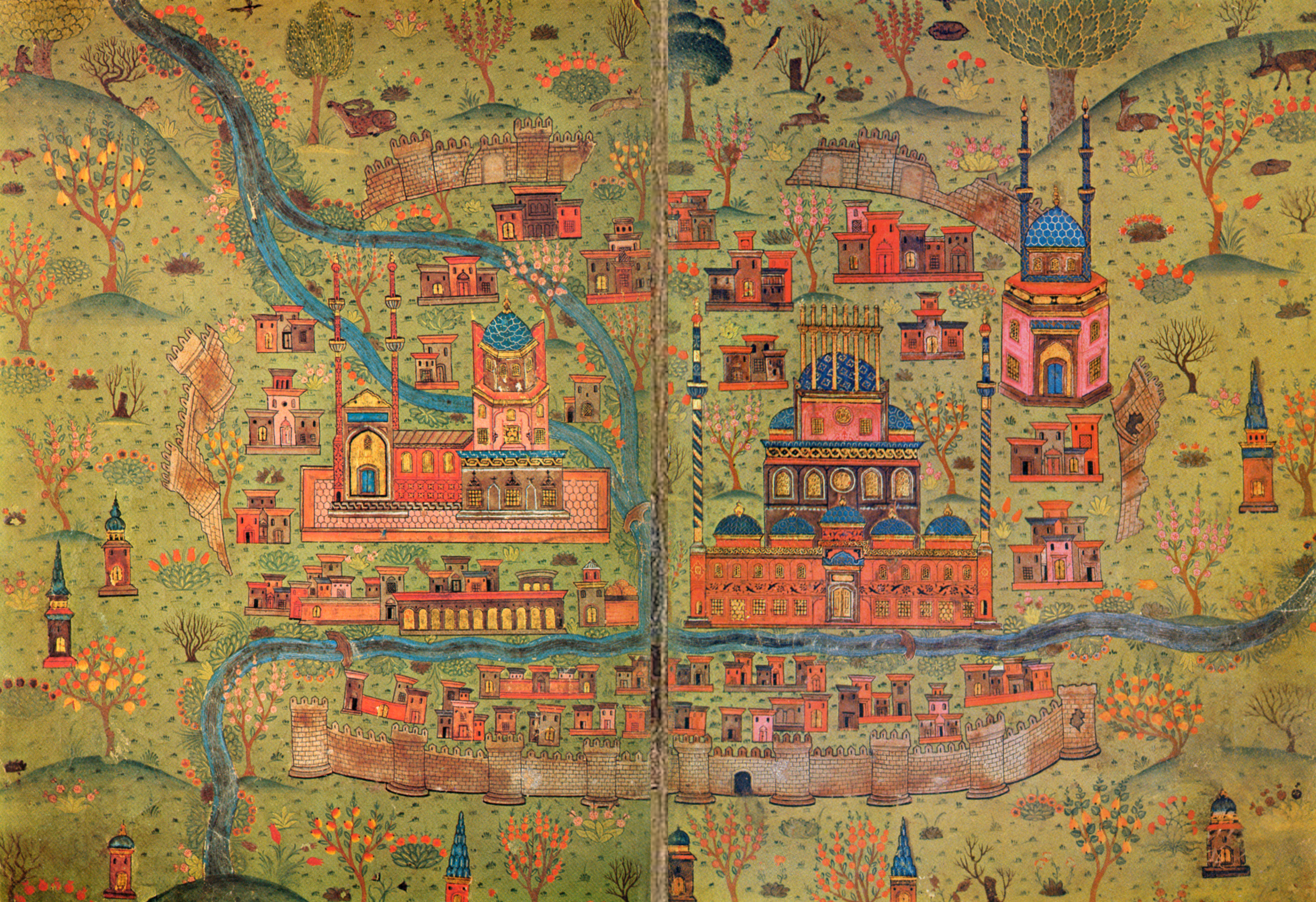
- Map of Soltaniyeh by Matrakçı Nasuh, circa 1550
- Born: 1480; Visoko, Sanjak of Bosnia, Ottoman Bosnia and Herzegovina, Ottoman Empire
- Died: c. 1564 (aged 83–84)
- Known for: Matrak, Ottoman miniature
- Spouse: none

Nasuh bin Karagöz bin Abdullah el-Visokavi el-Bosnavî, commonly known as Matrakçı Nasuh (Turkish pronunciation: [matɾakˈtʃɯ naˈsuh]; Serbo-Croatian: Matrakčija Nasuh Visočak) for his competence in the combat sport of Matrak which was invented by himself, (also known as Nasuh el-Silâhî, Nasuh the Swordsman, because of his talent with weapons; 1480 – c. 1564) was a 16th-century Ottoman Bosnian statesman of the Ottoman Empire, polymath, mathematician, philosopher, teacher, historian, geographer, cartographer, swordmaster, navigator, inventor, painter, farmer, and miniaturist.

He was brought to Constantinople after being recruited by Ottoman scouts in Rumelia. He was then educated, served several Ottoman sultans, and became a teacher at Enderun School.

== Life ==
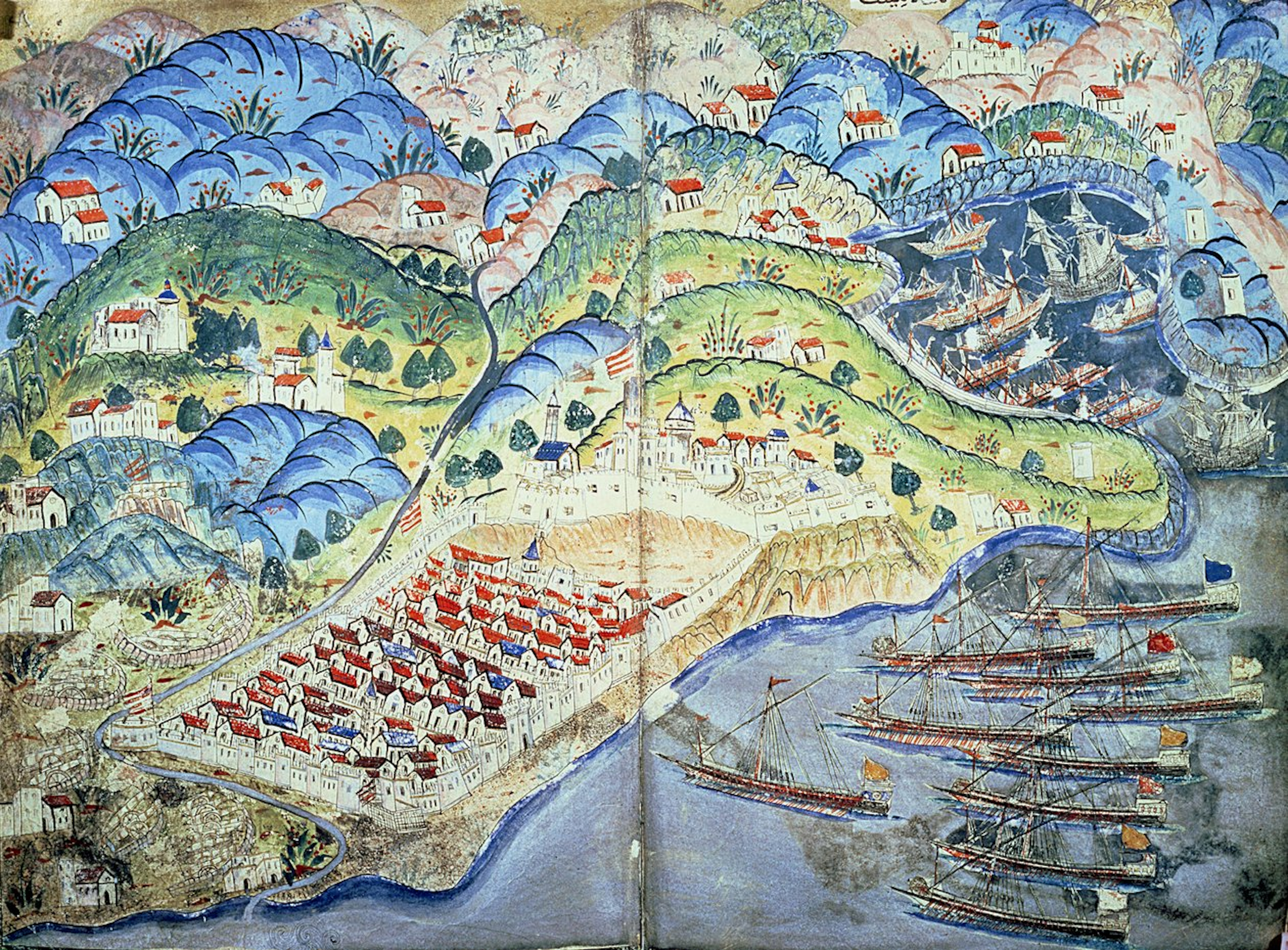
Siege of Nice (1543) by Matrakçı Nasuh

Matrakçı Nasuh, born in the Bosnian town of Visoko, was a Janissary who went through both the infantry and the devşirme system. He was a swordsman and sharpshooter who spoke five languages and was recruited into the Ottoman Navy.

Although born to Bosnian Muslim parentage, Nasuh was drafted into the devşirme system, usually reserved for the Christian populace of the empire. Exceptionally, however, in Bosnia, the devşirme was also extended to local Muslim families.

After a long period of studying mathematics and geometry, he wrote his works Cemâlü'l-Küttâb and Kemalü'l- Hisâb and submitted them to the Ottoman sultan Selim I. He wrote also the two books named Mecmaü't-Tevârih and Süleymannâme, on history from 1520 to 1543. He also wrote a historical piece on the Persian campaign of Suleiman I titled Fetihname-i Karabuğdan. A recent study of his book Umdet-ul Hisab found that Matrakçı had invented some multiplication methods and that the lattice method had been widely used in the Enderun School nearly 50 years before John Napier reintroduced it to Europe.

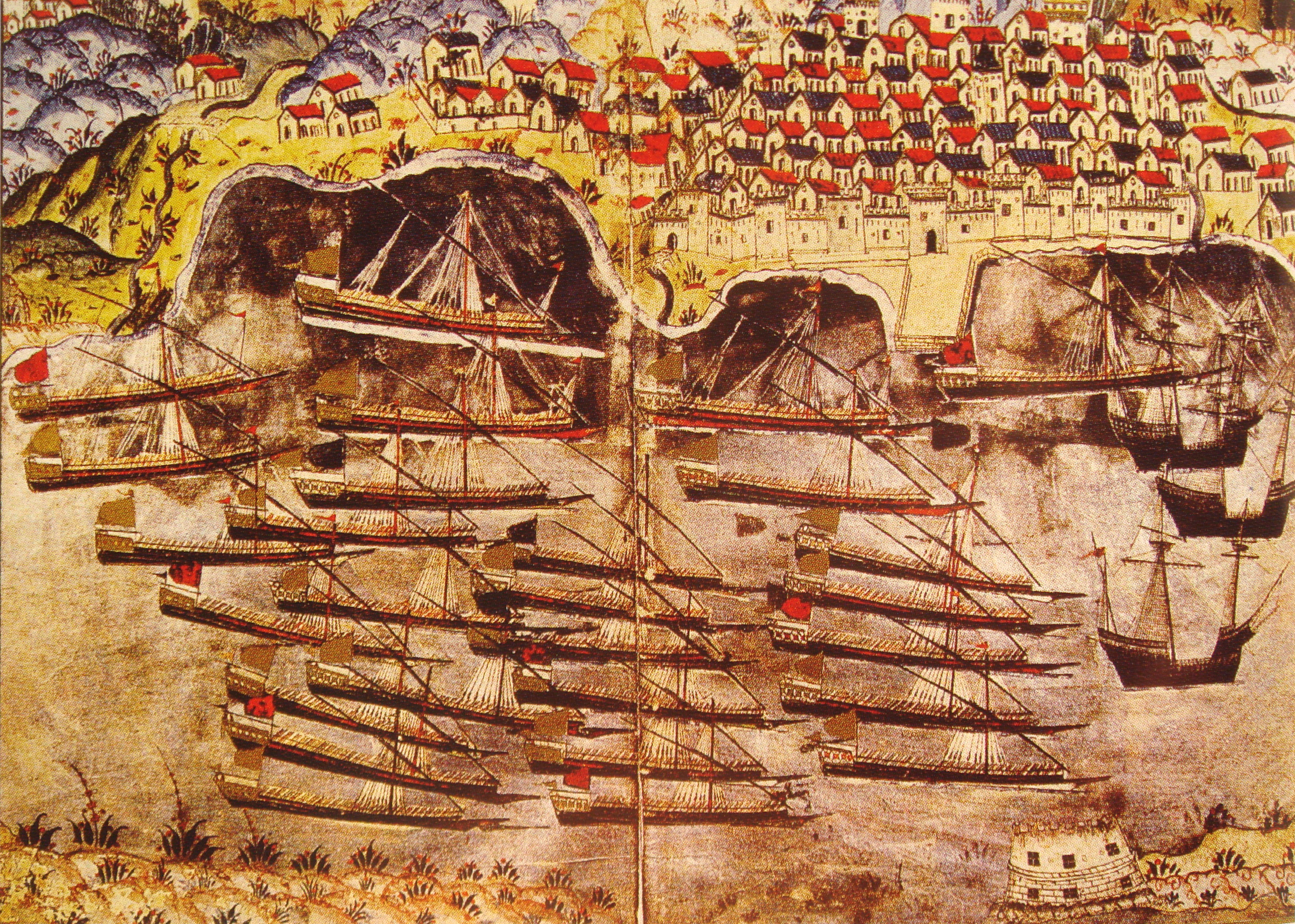
Wintering of the Ottoman fleet in Toulon (1543–44) by Matrakçı Nasuh

Besides his works on mathematics and history, he painted miniatures which focus on panoramic views of landscapes and cities painted with the greatest detail (his Constantinople landscape picture, shows almost every street and building of the city). In Ottoman miniature art, this was later known as the "Matrakçı style". One of his four volumes of miniatures deals with Suleiman I's Safavid war, upon which he had written his historical work Fetihname-i Karabuğdan. Besides illustrating the march of the Ottoman Army from Constantinople to Baghdad and then Tabriz and its return via Aleppo and Eskişehir, Nasuh also includes all the cities met by the army along the way. The Library of Istanbul University hosts the only copy of this work.

Nasuh was also a soldier and a master bladesmith. He worked as a weapons teacher at Enderun School. He and his students demonstrated their skills in a show which was part of the circumcision celebrations of Suleiman I's sons including future sultan Selim II. Because of his success in this demonstration, Nasuh received the honorary title of Ustad ("master") and Reis ("chief") from the sultan. He also wrote a book about usage of various weapons and techniques of cavalry and infantry fight, called Tuhfet-ül Guzât.

== Mathematics ==
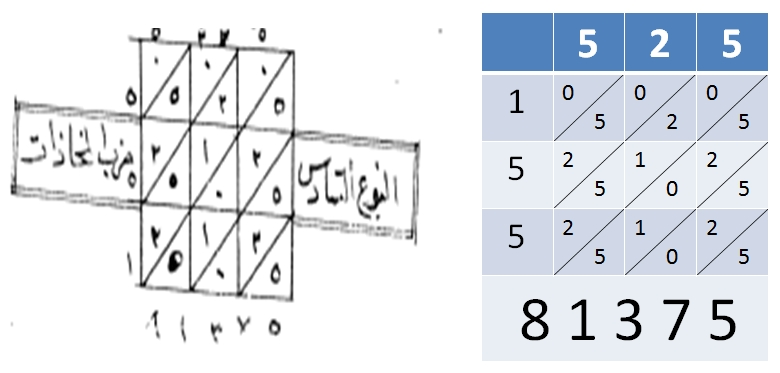
Matraki's square lattice multiplication

Nasuh, who made a name for himself in mathematics, was especially interested in arithmetic and Algebra. He was the first to introduce the Lattice multiplication system.

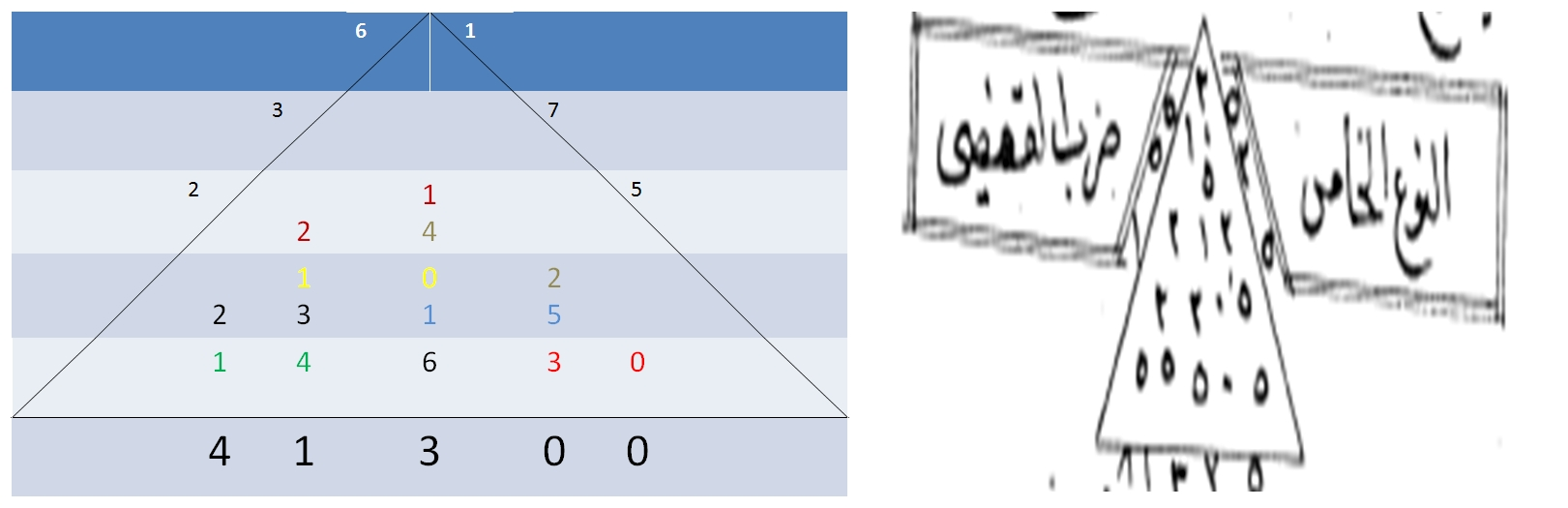
Matraki's triangular lattice multiplication

Multiplication begins by multiplying two numbers in the same column from the far right of the row. Since the 4x5 product (20) is a two-digit number, the number in the theirs digit (2) is written above the mesh, and the number (0) in the ones digit is written below the mesh.

== Works ==
=== Mathematics ===
- Cemâlü'l-Küttâb
- Kemalü'l- Hisâb
- Umdetü'l-Hisâb

=== History ===
- Mecmaü't-Tevârih (Sum of History)
- Süleymannâme (Book of Suleiman)
- Fetihname-i Karabuğdan (Book of Conquest of Moldavia)
- Beyan-ı Menazil-i Sefer-i Irakeyn-i Sultan Süleyman Han (Chronicle of Stages of Campaign of Iraq and Persia of Sultan Suleiman Khan)
- "TÂRÎH-İ ÂL-İ OSMÂN(Rüstem Pasha History)
- Tuhfet-ul Guzat (Gift of Warriors)
- "Târih-i Sultan Bâyezid

== Gallery ==
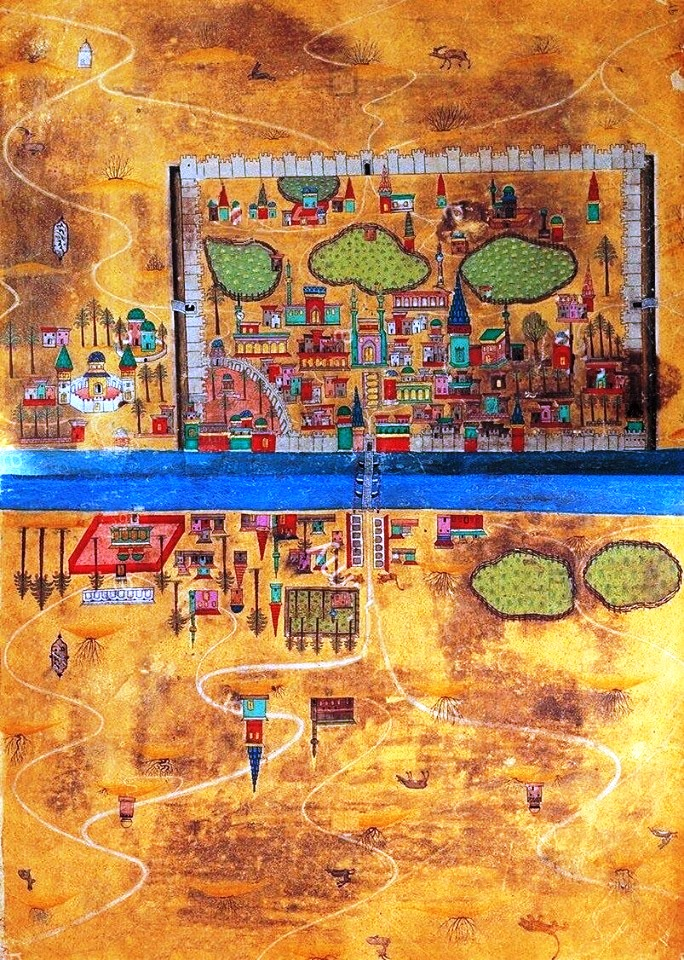
Map of Baghdad

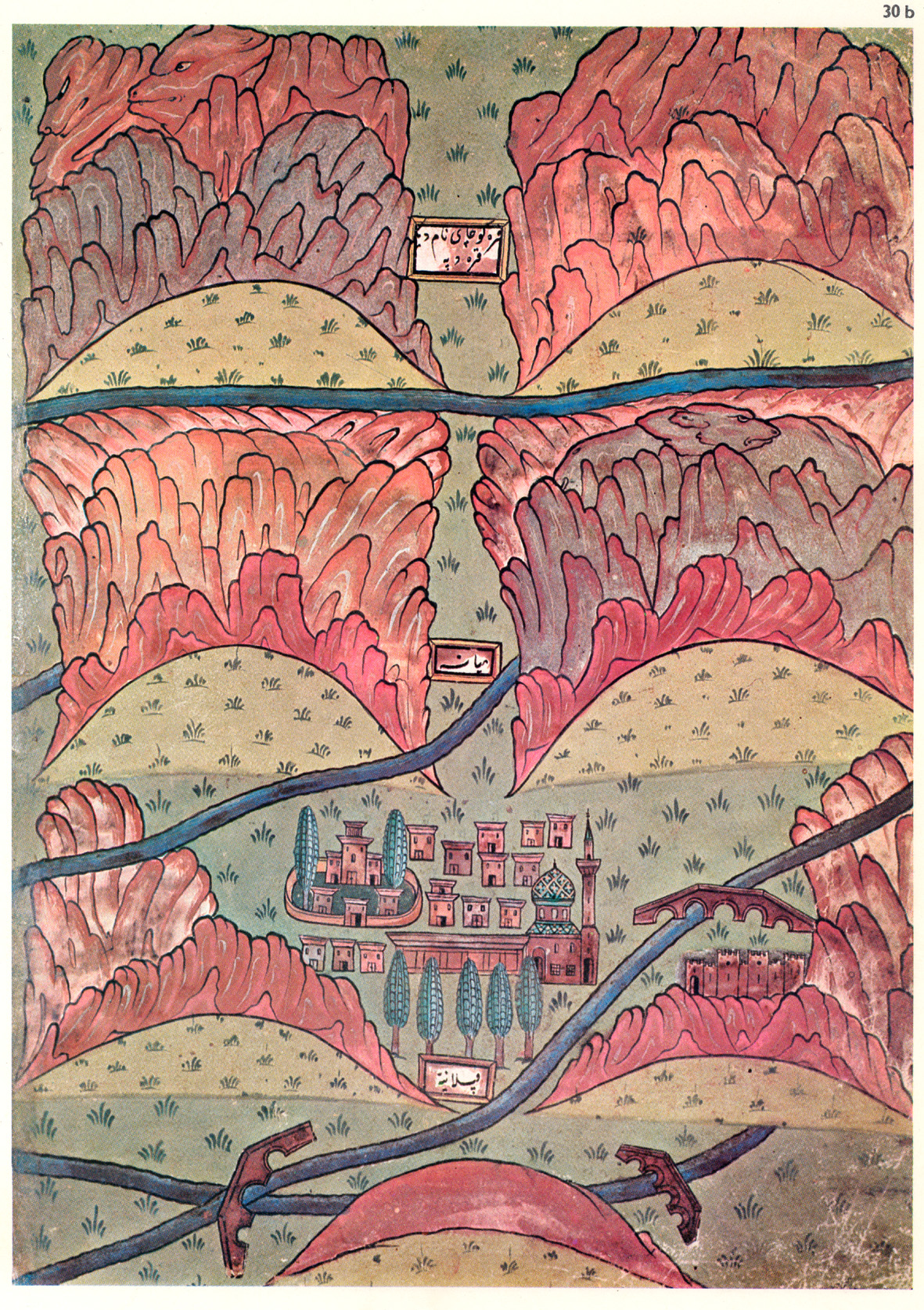
Miniaturised Map

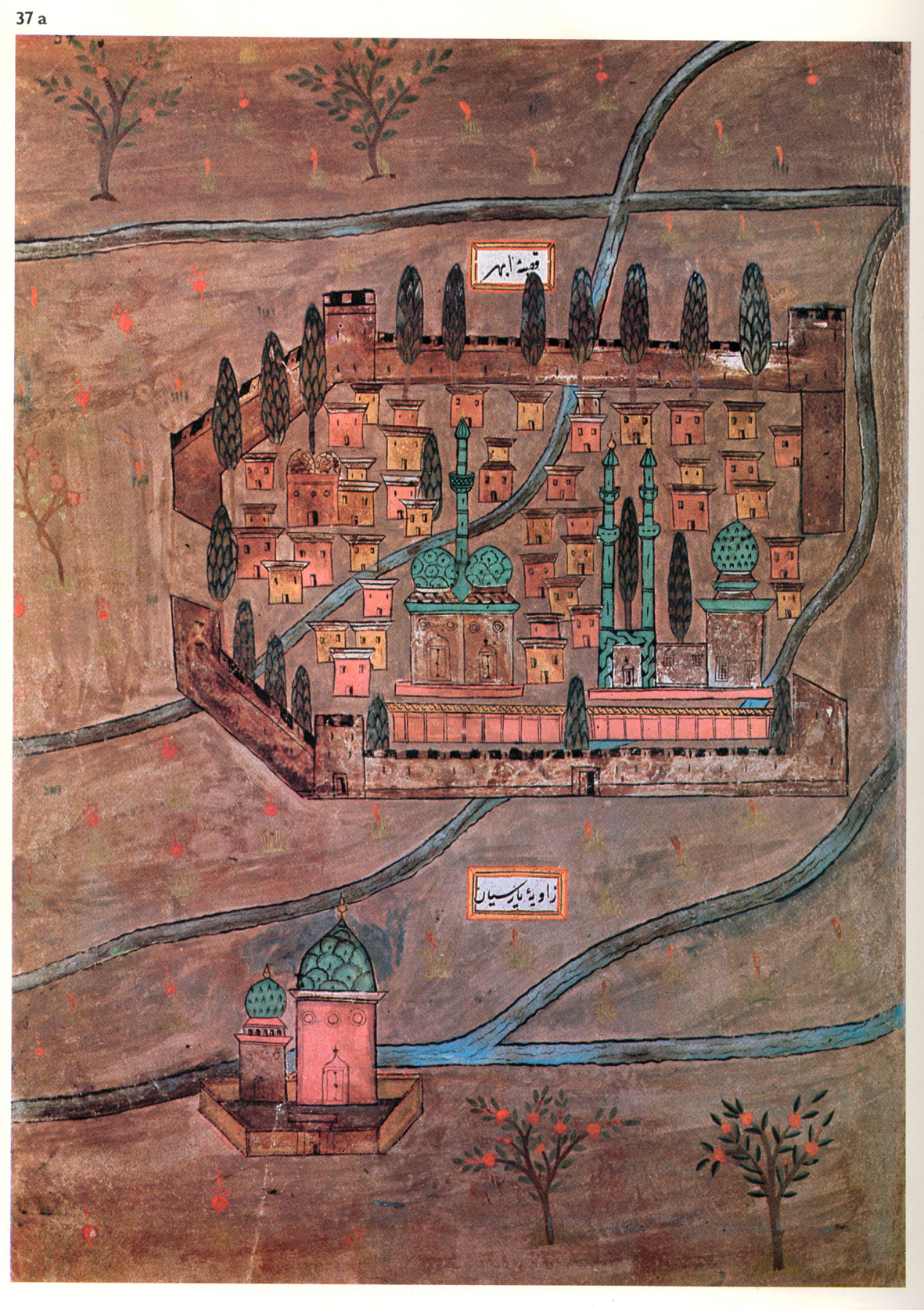
Miniaturised Map

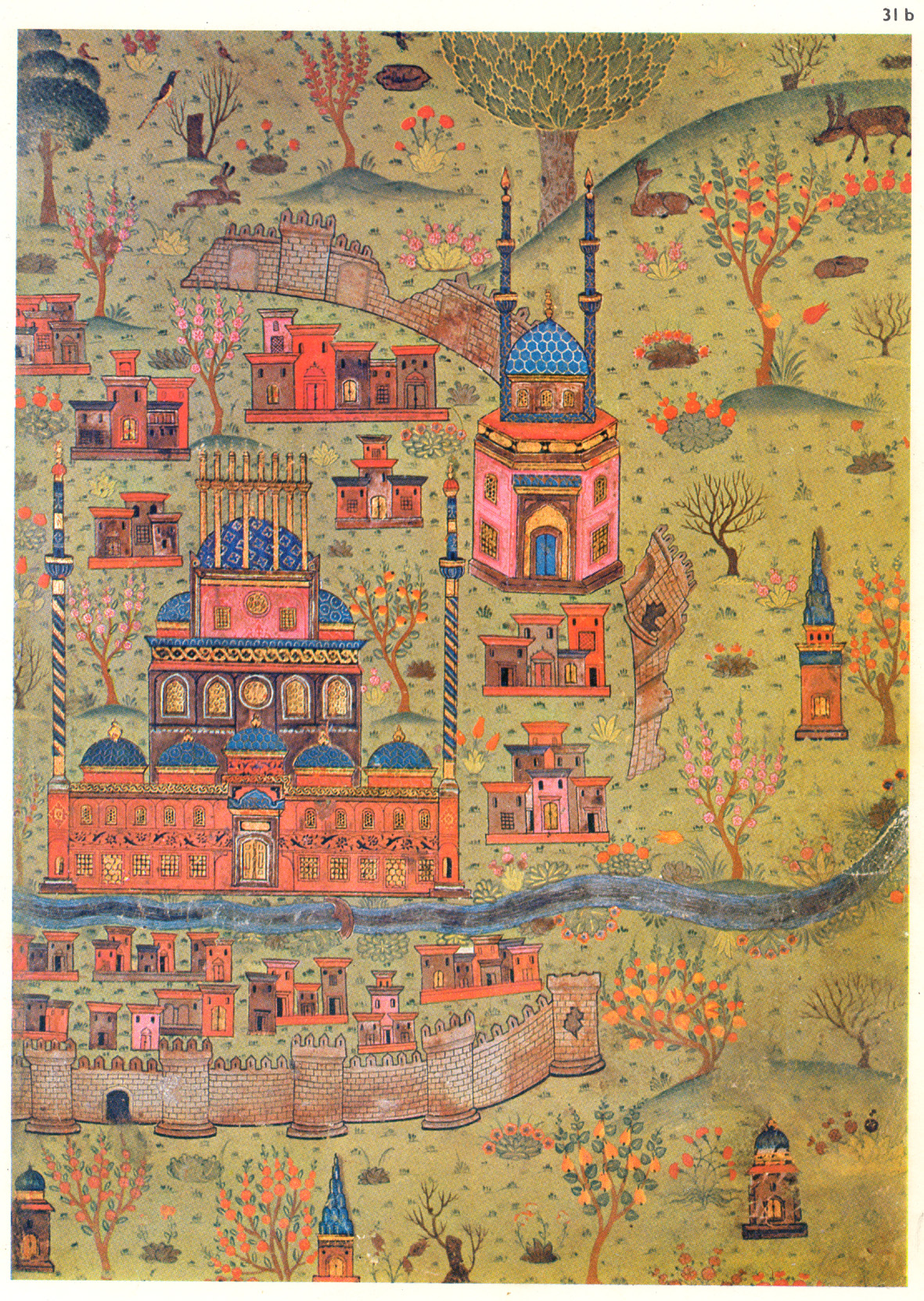
16th century map of Soltaniyeh city by Matrakçı Nasuh

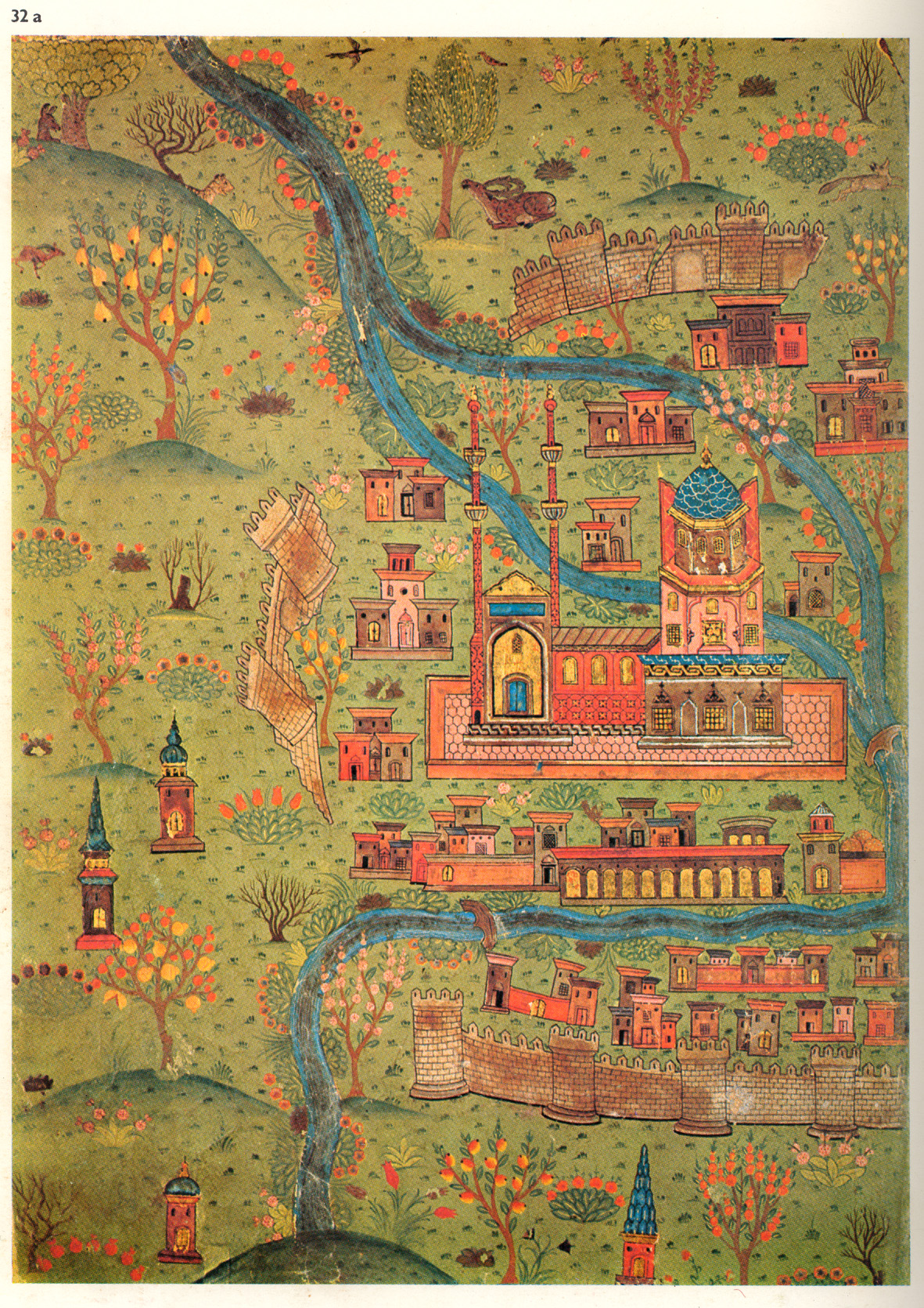
16th century map of Soltaniyeh city by Matrakçı Nasuh

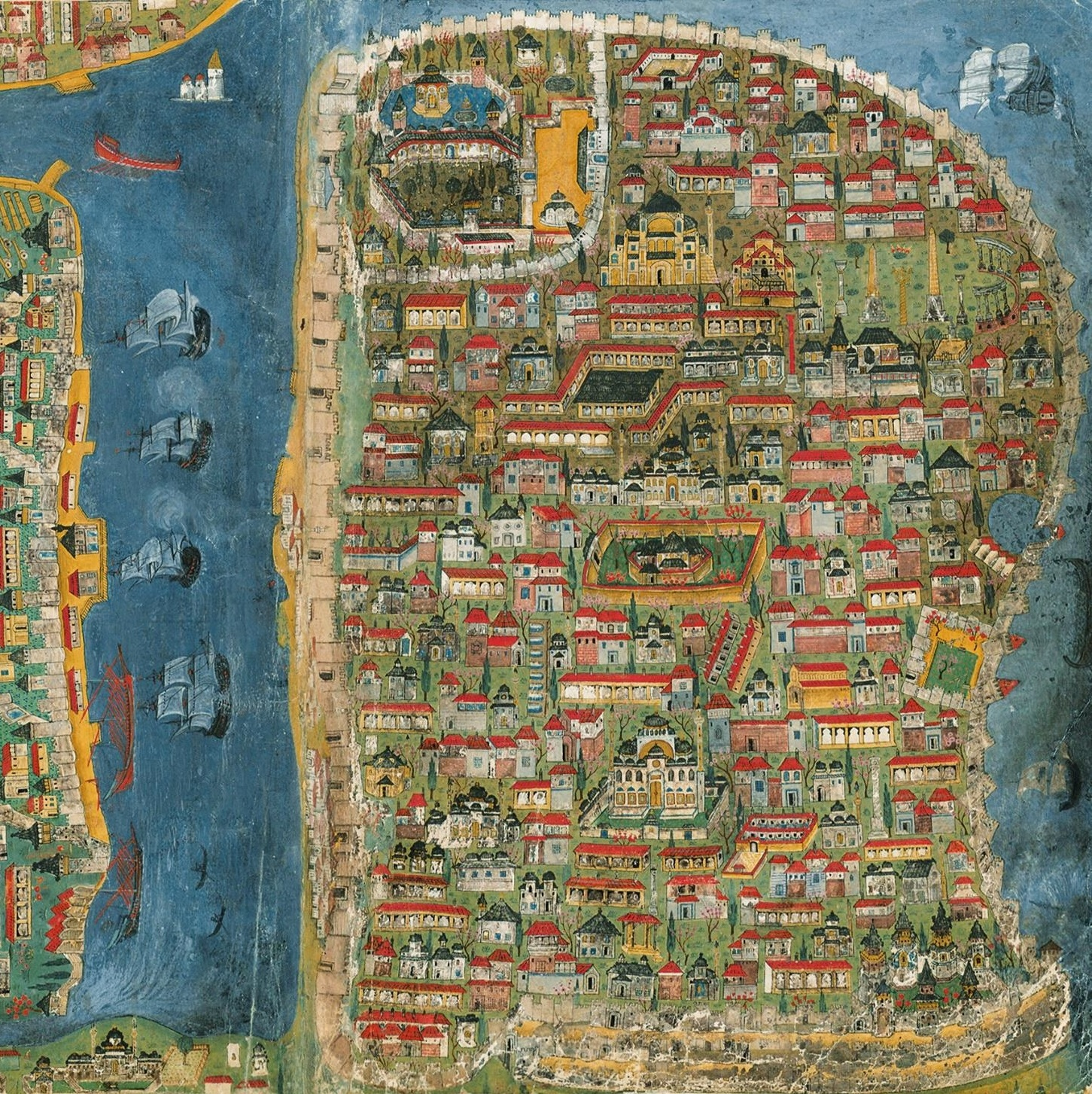
Map of Constantinople

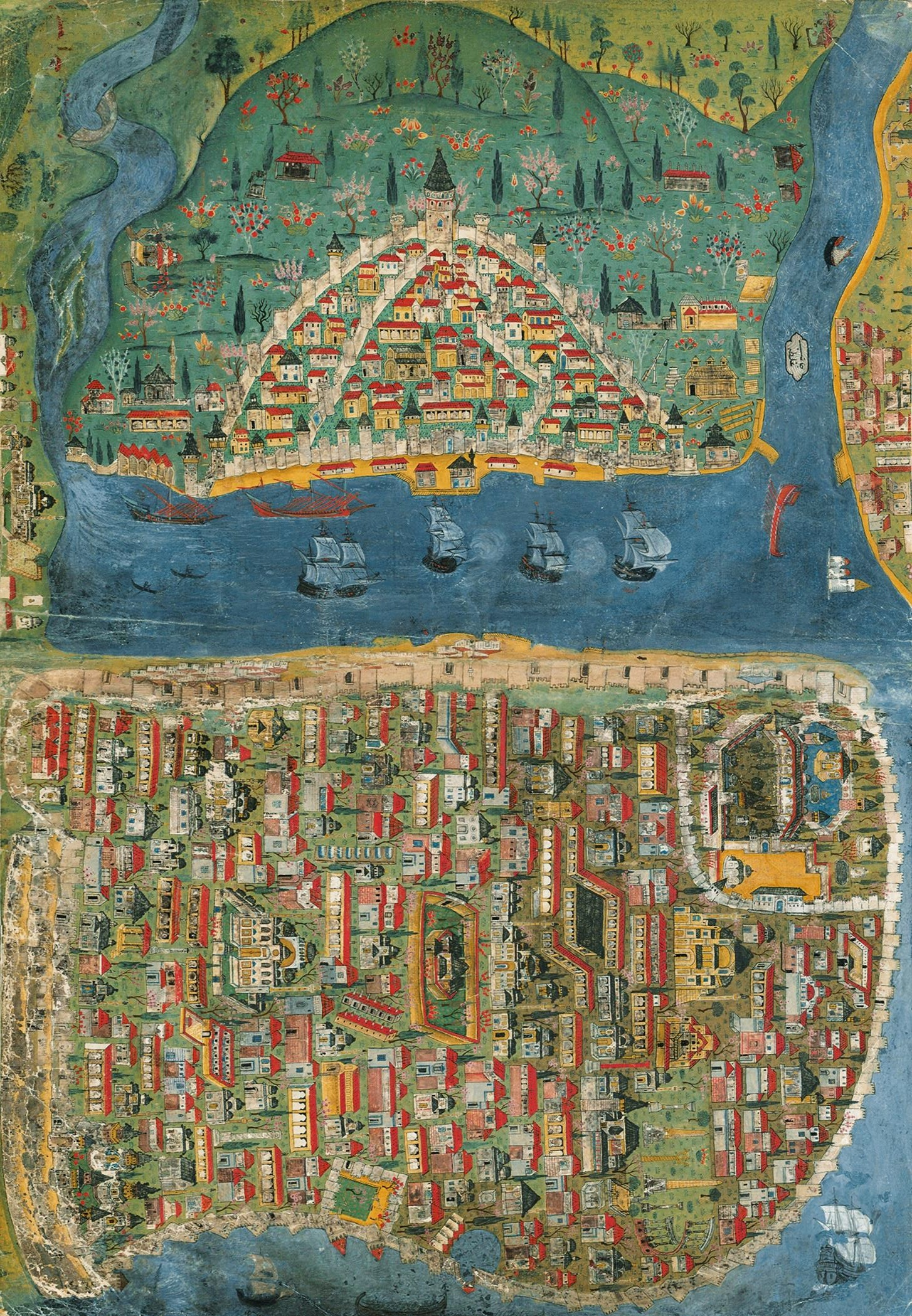
Map of Constantinople

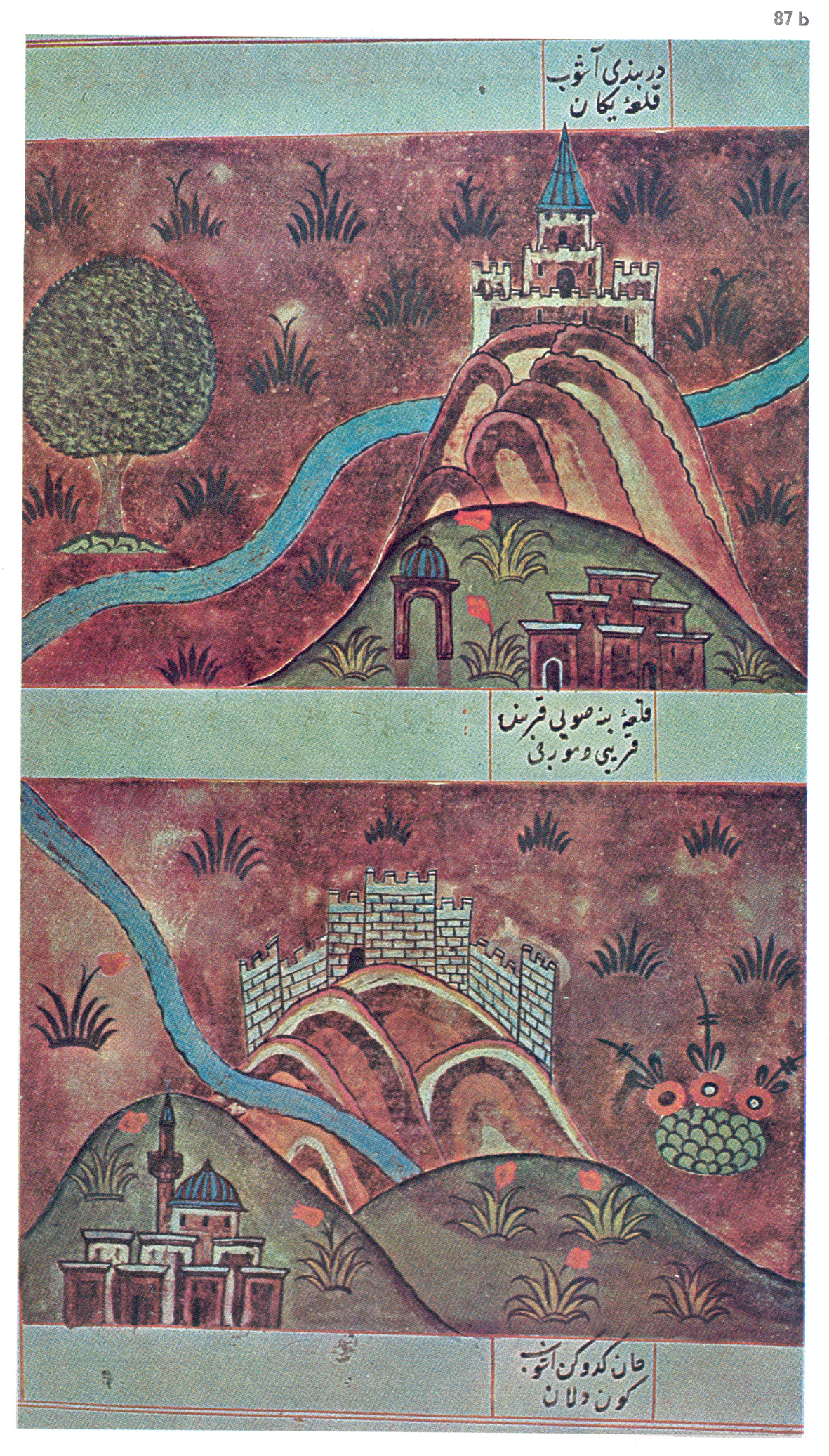

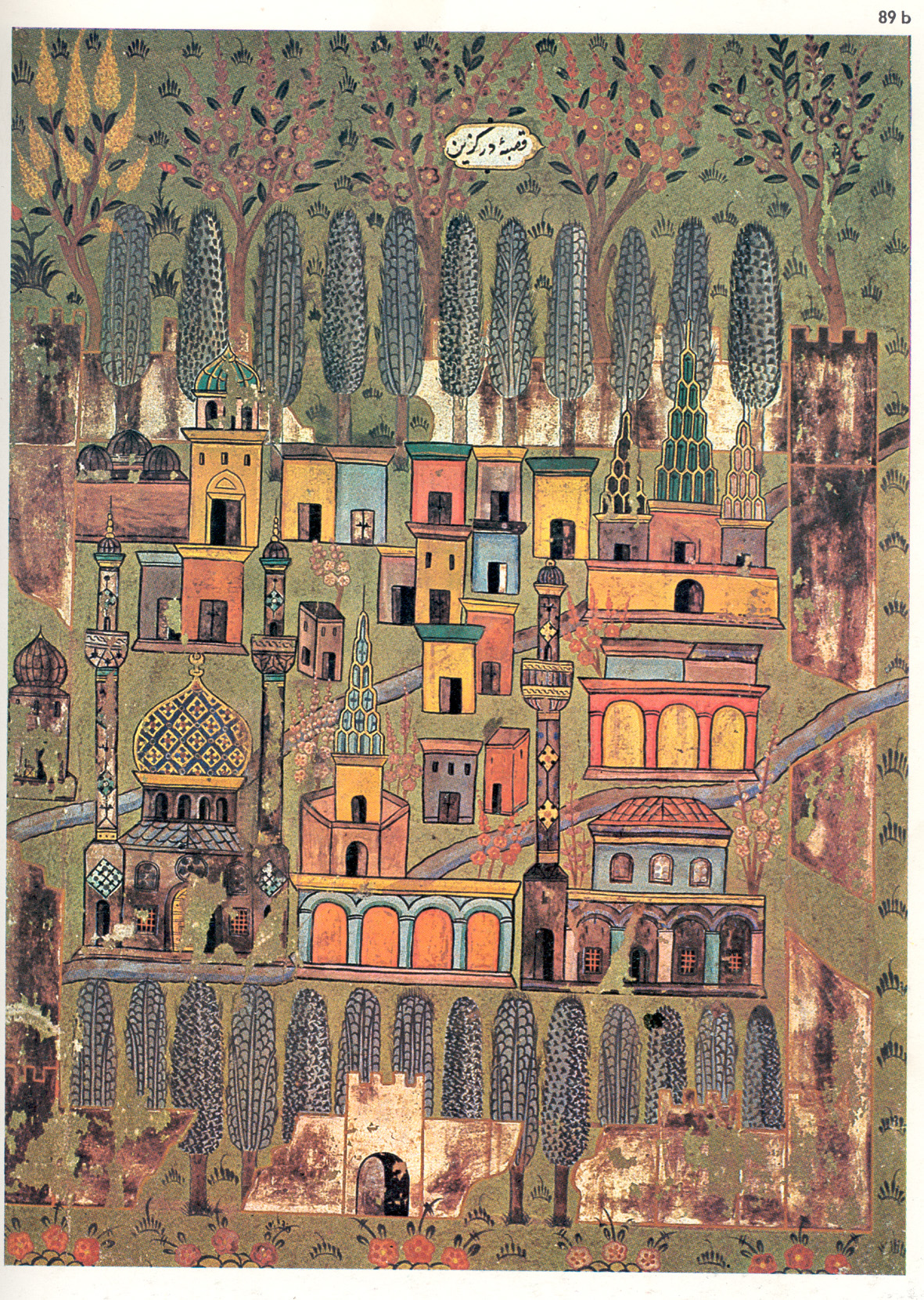

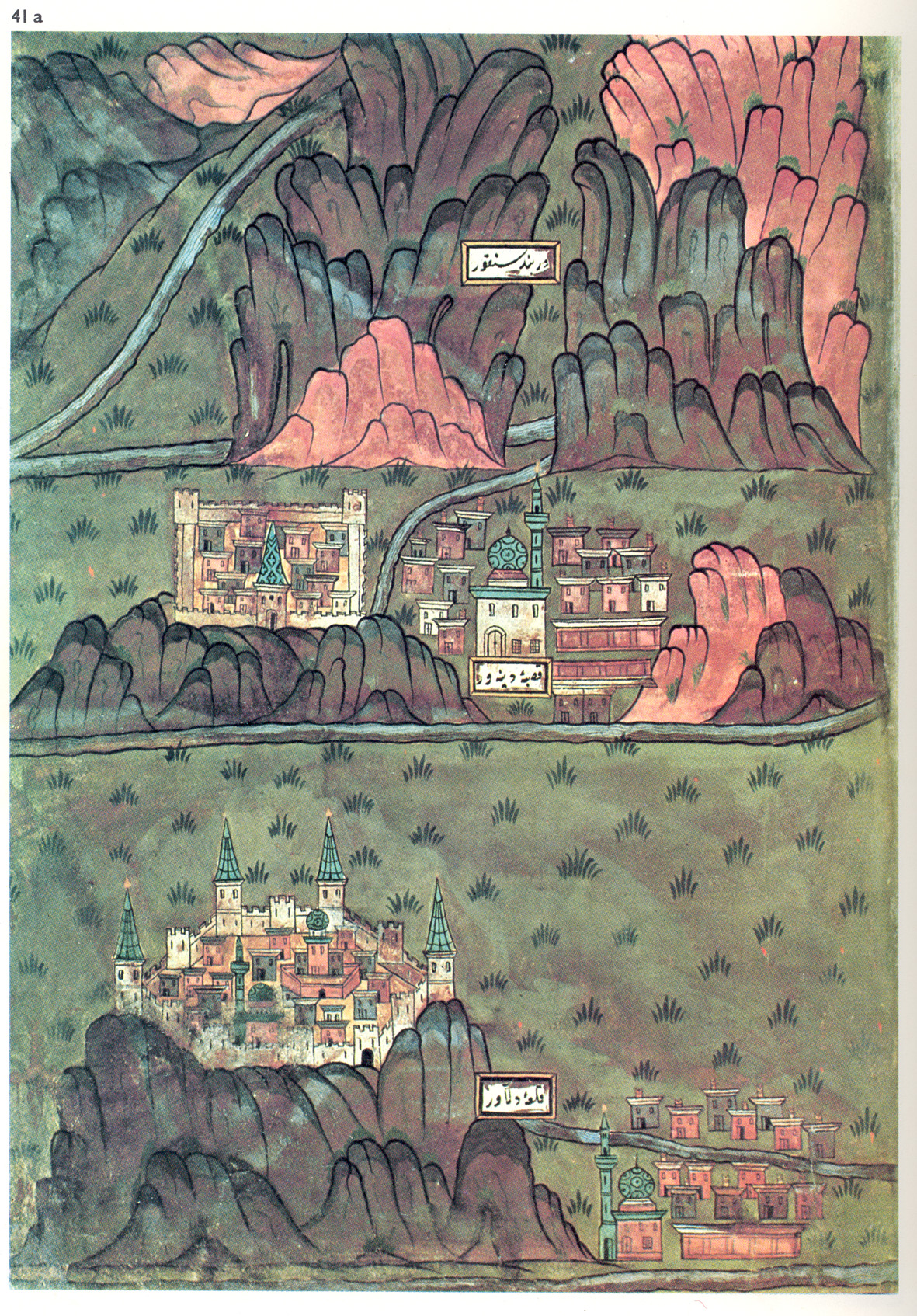

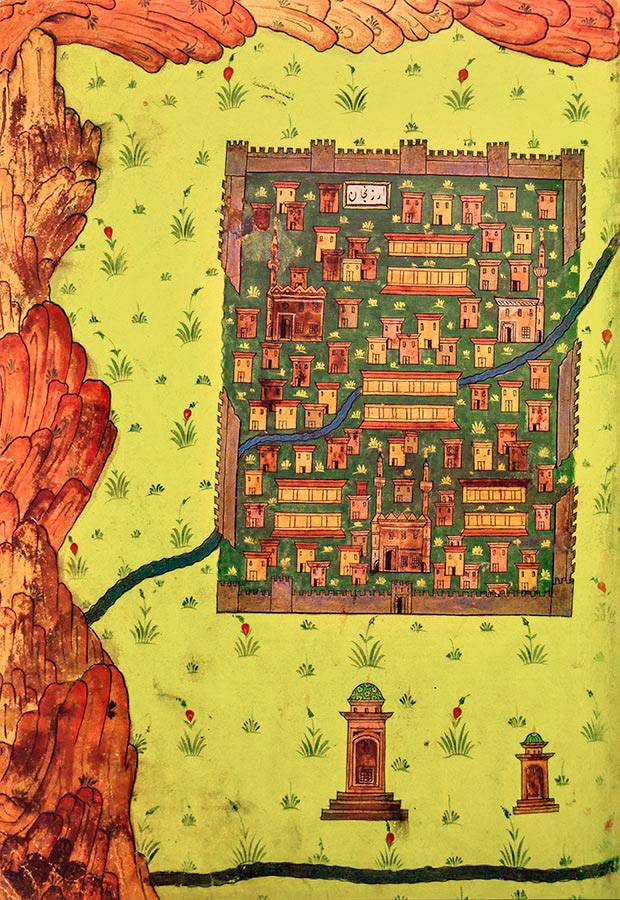
Map of Erzincan

== Honors and legacy ==
In his hometown of Visoko, in Bosnia Matrakčija is regarded as a Bosnian Leonardo da Vinci. A street near the Hometown Heritage Museum Visoko (Zavičajni Muzej Visoko) is named after him: Matrakčijina (English: Matrakci's Street).

A documentary film about Matrakçı was produced by Turkish Radio-television in 1978.

Fatih Al portrayed Matrakçı Nasuh Pasha in 2011's Magnificent Century.
