= Matrak =

Ottoman combat sport

Matrak is an Ottoman combat sport based on sword and shield fighting, Invented by the Ottoman Bosnian statesman, historian and scientist Nasuh Matrakčija Visočak (full name in Turkish: Nasuh bin Karagöz bin Abdullah el-Bosnavî) in the 16th century. It is played with wooden sticks covered with leather simulating a sword, and a wooden leather covered shield. The top of the sticks are rounded and slightly wider than the body resembling bowling pins. The game is a kind of combat simulation, and is played on a lawn. It was used by Ottoman soldiers as practice for melee combat.

In the television series Muhteşem Yüzyıl, it is shown as a combat-game.
