= Fort du mont Alban =

Coordinates: 43.701297°N 7.300175°E

The Fort of Mont Alban is a military fortification in the city of Nice. Built between 1557 and 1560 after the 1543 Siege of Nice, on the eponymous hill between Nice and the harbor of Villefranche-sur-Mer, it is one of the rare examples of military architecture from the mid-16th century in France in a good state of preservation.

== Description ==
Located on a strategic point, at an altitude of 220 metres, it offers a magnificent panorama, to the west over the Baie des Anges to the Massif de l'Esterel, and to the east over the bay of Villefranche-sur-Mer to the Italian Riviera. It has a rectangular plan, 40 by 46 metres on each side, with ramparts pierced with embrasures, and extended by very prominent corner bastions in the shape of ace of spades, flanked by stone sentry boxes.

== Classification ==
The fort of Mont Alban is classified as a historic monument, by decrees of 20 February 1909 for the fort enclosure, 20 August 1913 for the enclosure walls and 23 February 1923 for the perimeter of 250 metres.

== Gallery ==
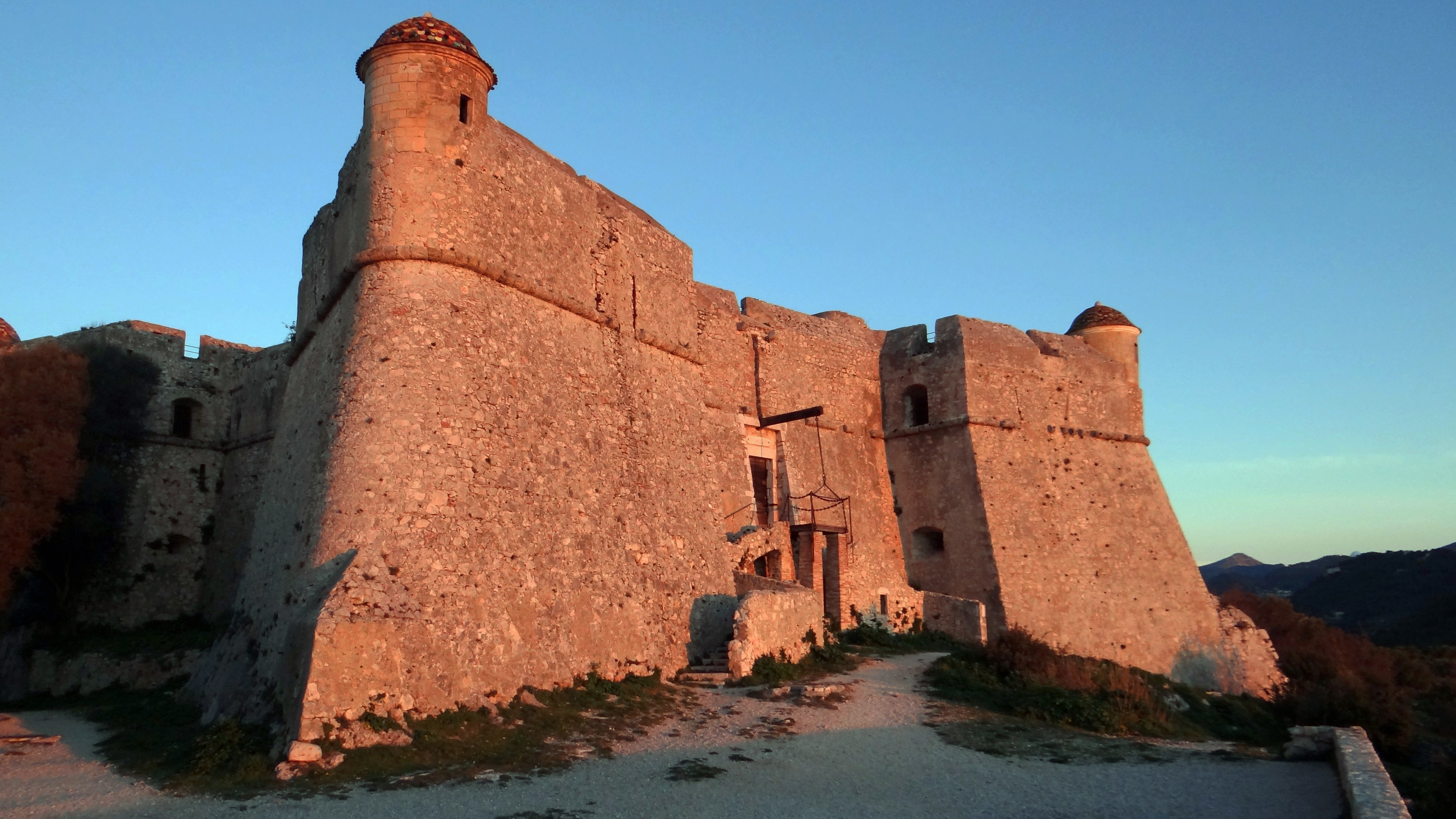
East side of the fort during sunrise.

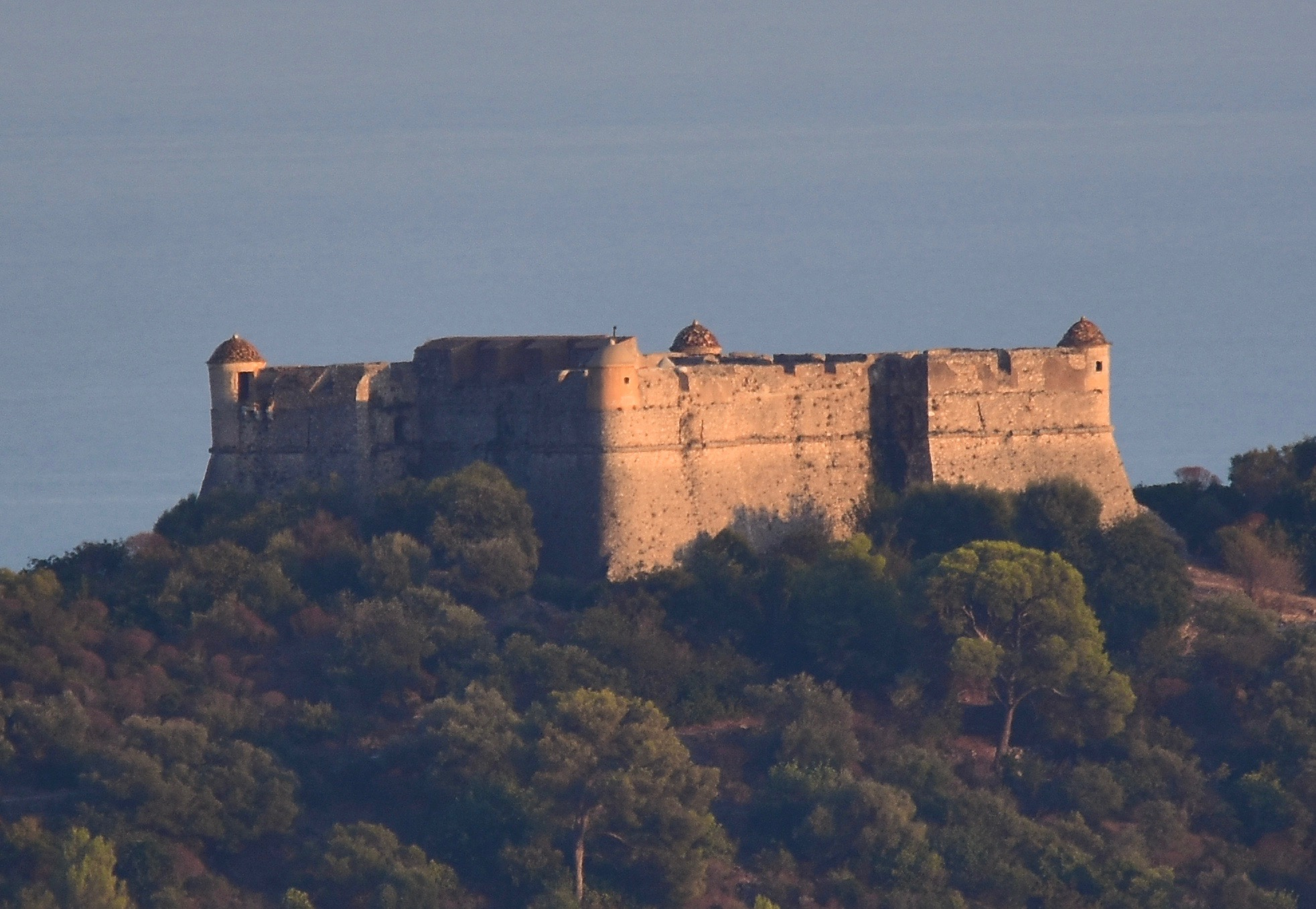
North-west side of the fort during sunset.

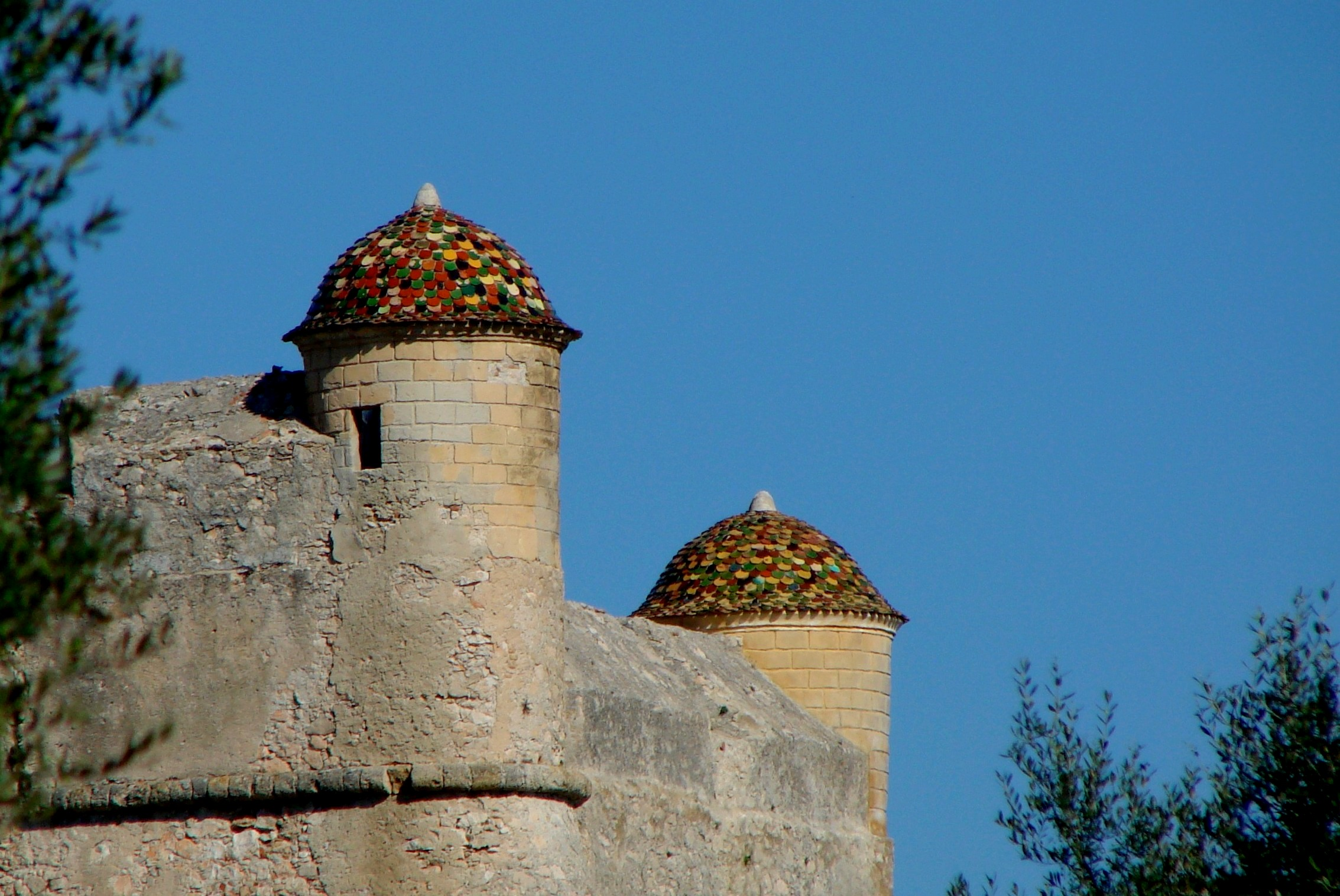
The two stone sentry boxes on the South side.

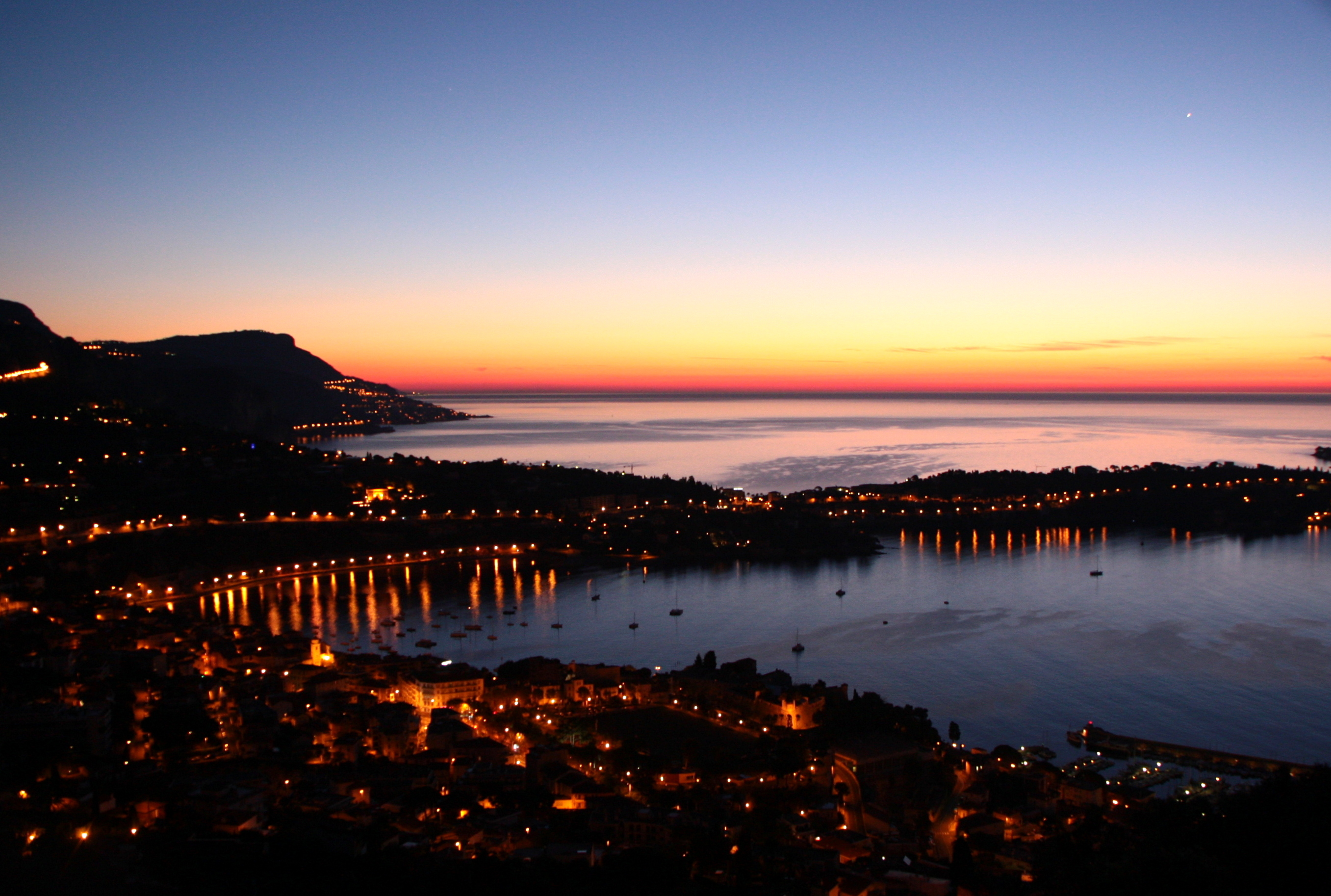
View to the east from the Fort du Mont Alban. The bay of Villefranche and Cap Ferrat, and in the distance Monaco.

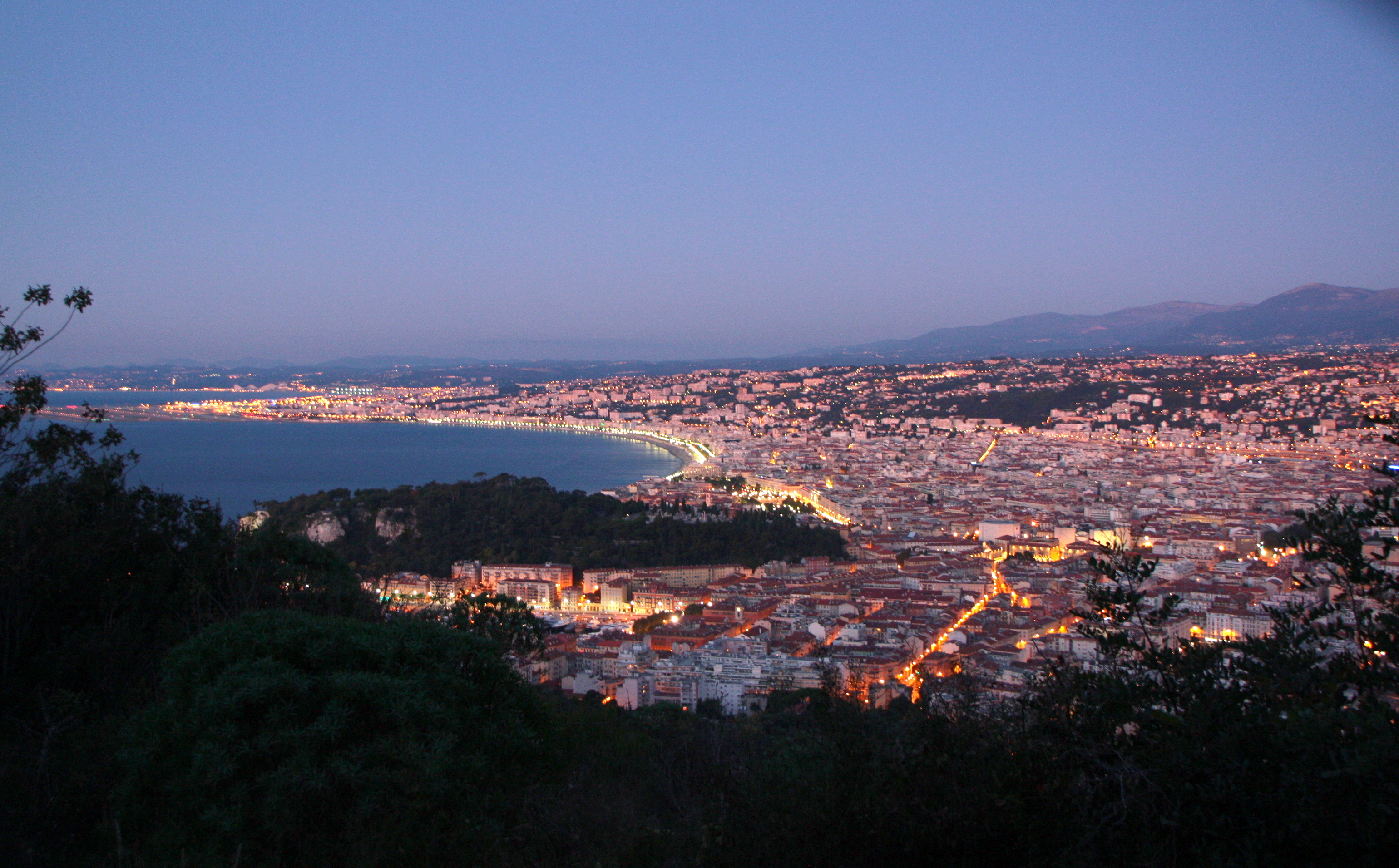
View looking west from the Fort du Mont Alban in Nice. The Baie des Anges and the city of Nice at dawn.

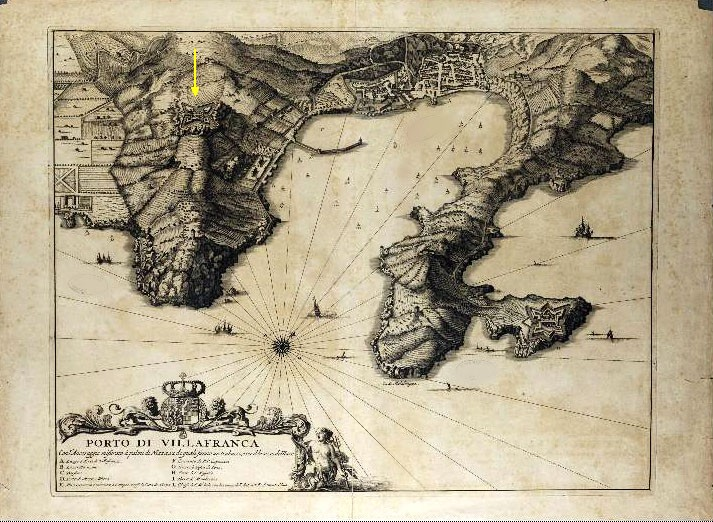
The fort located on an 18th-century map.
