= Catherine Ségurane =

Legendary heroine from Nice in France

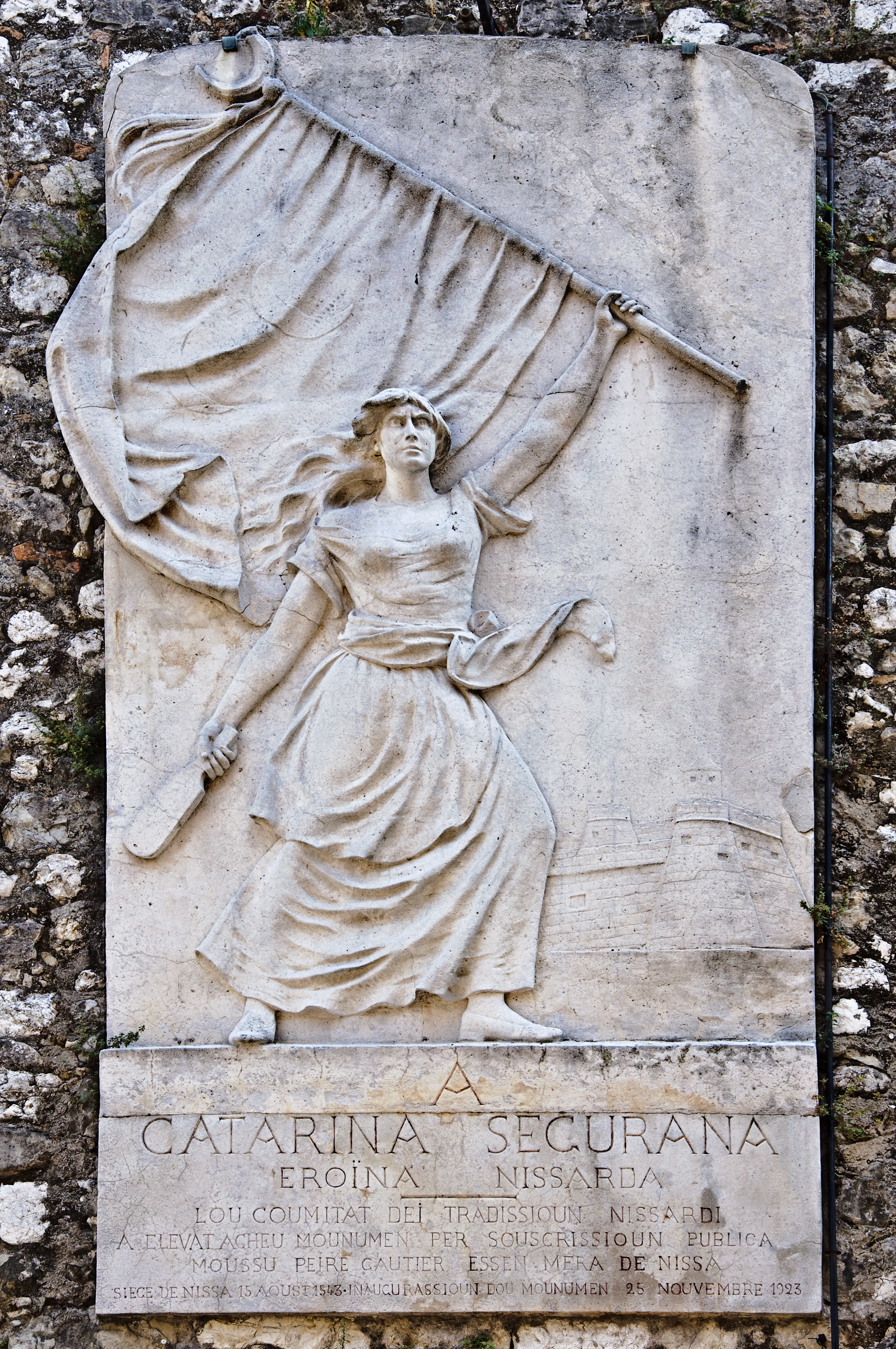
Memorial in bas-relief to Catherine Ségurane.

Catherine Ségurane (Catarina Ségurana in the Niçard dialect of Provençal) is a folk heroine of the city of Nice, France who is said to have played a decisive role in repelling the city's siege by Turkish invaders allied with Francis I, during the Franco-Ottoman siege of Nice, in the summer of 1543.

== Legend ==
At the time, Nice was part of Savoy, independent from France, and had no standing military to defend it. Most versions of the tale have Catherine Ségurane, a common washerwoman, leading the townspeople into battle. Legend has it that she knocked out a standard-bearer with her beater and took his flag.

== Historicity ==
Catherine's existence has never been definitively proven, and her heroic act is likely pure fiction or highly exaggerated; Jean Badat, a historian who stood witness to the siege, made no mention of her involvement in the defense. Historically attested defense of Nice include the townspeople's destruction of a key bridge and the arrival of an army mustered by a Charles III of Savoy.

Nevertheless, the legend of Catherine Ségurane has excited the local imagination. Louis Andrioli wrote an epic poem about her in 1808, and a play dedicated to her story was written by Jean-Baptiste Toselli in 1878. In 1923, a bas-relief monument to Catherine was erected near the supposed location of her feat.

== Commemoration ==
In Nice, Catherine Segurane Day is celebrated annually, concurrent with St. Catherine's Day on 25 November.
