= List of diplomatic missions of France =

The French Republic has one of the world's largest diplomatic networks, and is a member of more multilateral organisations than any other country.

France's permanent representation abroad began in the reign of Francis I, when in 1522 he sent a delegation to the Swiss. Despite its reduced presence following decolonization, France still has substantial influence throughout the world.

Honorary consulates are excluded from this listing.

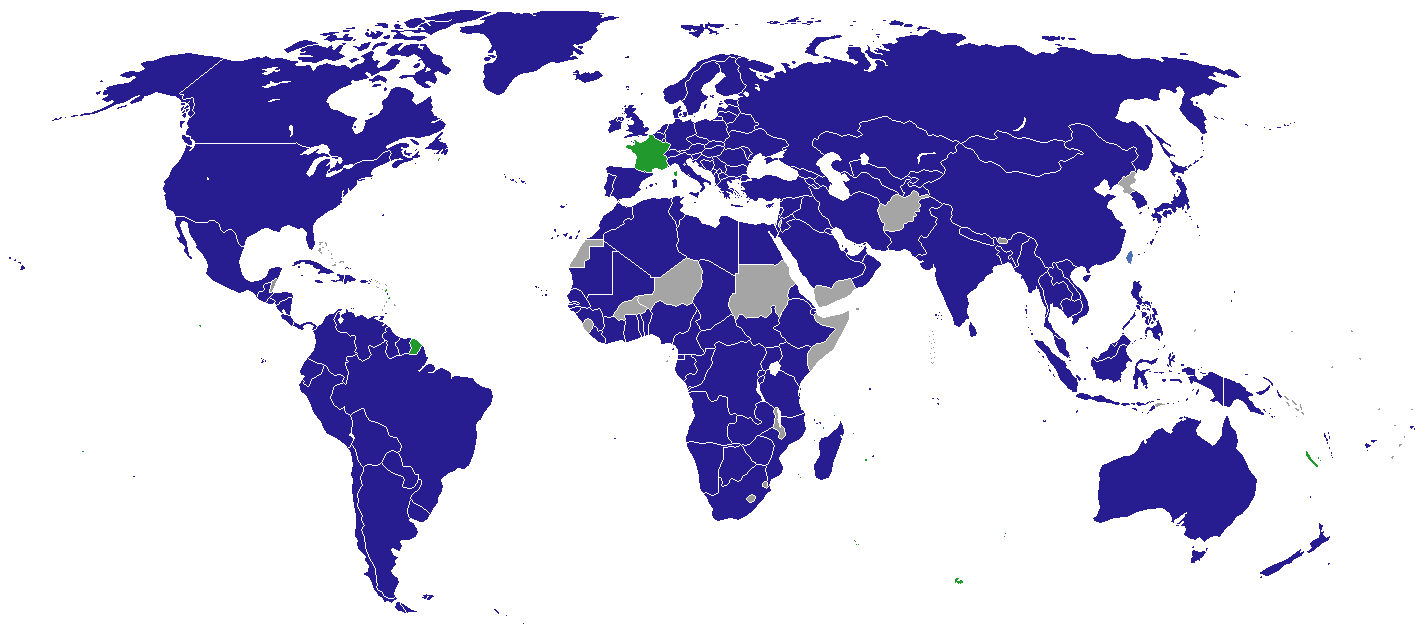
Diplomatic missions of France French Republic Countries where France has an embassy Countries where France does not have a diplomatic or consular mission

== Current missions ==
=== Africa ===
Host country	Host city	Mission	Concurrent accreditation	Ref.
Algeria	Algiers	Embassy		
Algeria	Annaba	Consulate-General		
Algeria	Oran	Consulate-General		
Angola	Luanda	Embassy		
Benin	Cotonou	Embassy		
Botswana	Gaborone	Embassy		
Burundi	Bujumbura	Embassy		
Cameroon	Yaoundé	Embassy		
Cameroon	Douala	Consulate-General		
Cape Verde	Praia	Embassy		
Central African Republic	Bangui	Embassy		
Chad	N'Djamena	Embassy		
Comoros	Moroni	Embassy		
Congo-Brazzaville	Brazzaville	Embassy		
Congo-Brazzaville	Pointe Noire	Consulate-General		
Congo-Kinshasa	Kinshasa	Embassy		
Djibouti	Djibouti City	Embassy	Country: Yemen	
Egypt	Cairo	Embassy		
Egypt	Cairo	Consulate-General		
Egypt	Alexandria	Consulate-General		
Equatorial Guinea	Malabo	Embassy		
Eritrea	Asmara	Embassy		
Ethiopia	Addis Ababa	Embassy	International Organization: African Union	
Gabon	Libreville	Embassy	Country: São Tomé and Príncipe	
Gambia	Banjul	Embassy office		
Ghana	Accra	Embassy		
Guinea	Conakry	Embassy	Country: Sierra Leone	
Guinea-Bissau	Bissau	Embassy		
Ivory Coast	Abidjan	Embassy		
Kenya	Nairobi	Embassy	Country: Somalia; International Organizations: United Nations; United Nations Environment Programme; United Nations Human Settlements Programme	
Liberia	Monrovia	Embassy		
Libya	Tripoli	Embassy		
Madagascar	Antananarivo	Embassy		
Mali	Bamako	Embassy		
Mauritania	Nouakchott	Embassy		
Mauritius	Port Louis	Embassy		
Morocco	Rabat	Embassy		
Morocco	Agadir	Consulate-General		
Morocco	Casablanca	Consulate-General		
Morocco	Fez	Consulate-General		
Morocco	Marrakesh	Consulate-General		
Morocco	Tangier	Consulate-General		
Mozambique	Maputo	Embassy	Country: Eswatini	
Namibia	Windhoek	Embassy		
Nigeria	Abuja	Embassy		
Nigeria	Lagos	Consulate-General		
Rwanda	Kigali	Embassy		
Senegal	Dakar	Embassy	Country: Gambia	
Seychelles	Victoria	Embassy		
South Africa	Pretoria	Embassy	Countries: Lesotho; Malawi	
South Africa	Cape Town	Consulate-General	Countries: Lesotho; Malawi	
South Africa	Johannesburg	Consulate-General	Countries: Lesotho; Malawi	
South Sudan	Juba	Embassy		
Tanzania	Dar es Salaam	Embassy		
Tanzania	Dodoma	Liaison office		
Togo	Lomé	Embassy		
Tunisia	Tunis	Embassy		
Uganda	Kampala	Embassy		
Zambia	Lusaka	Embassy		
Zimbabwe	Harare	Embassy		

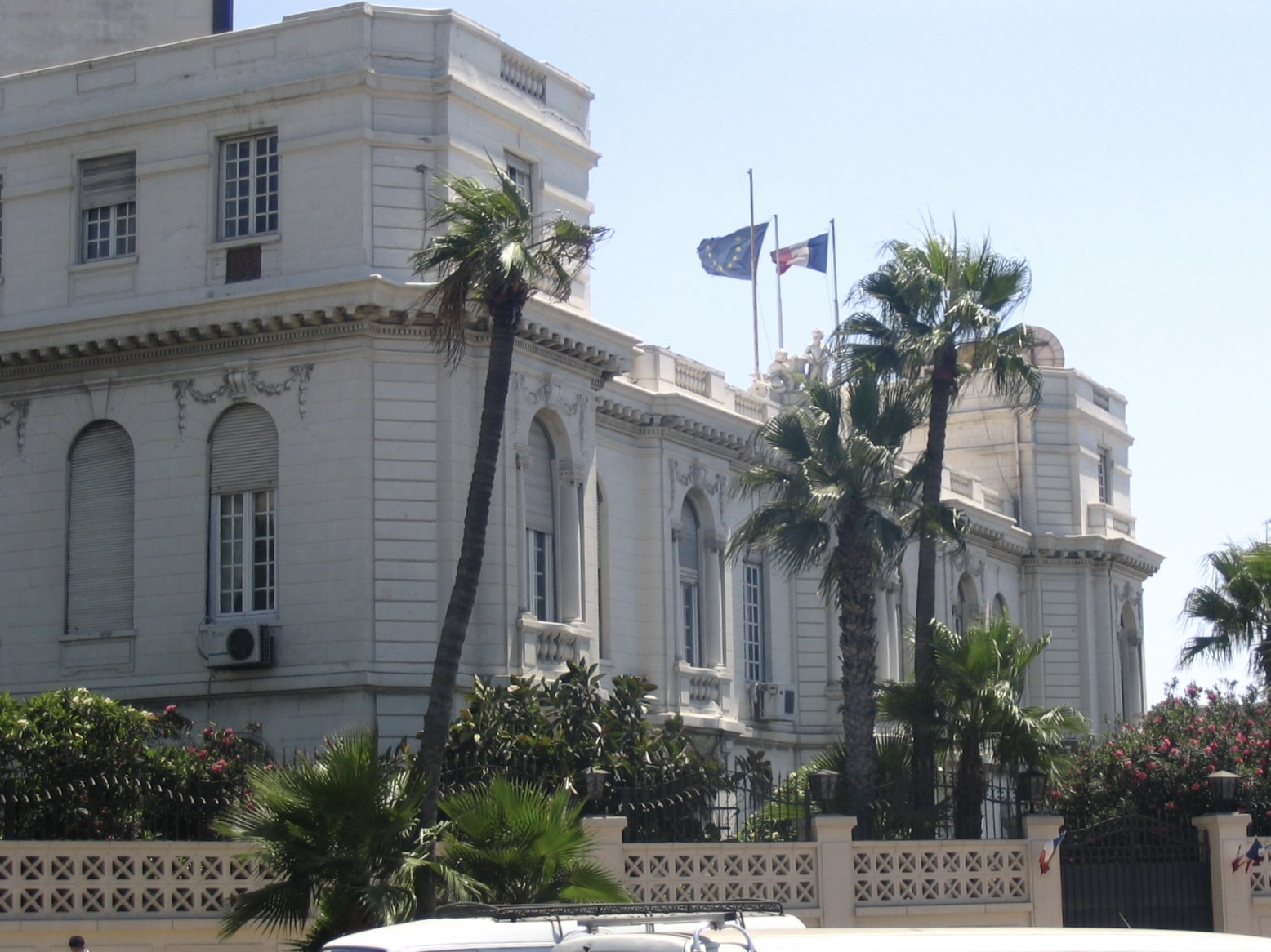
Consulate-General in Alexandria

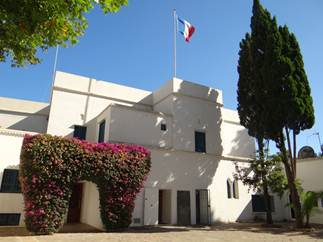
Embassy in Algiers

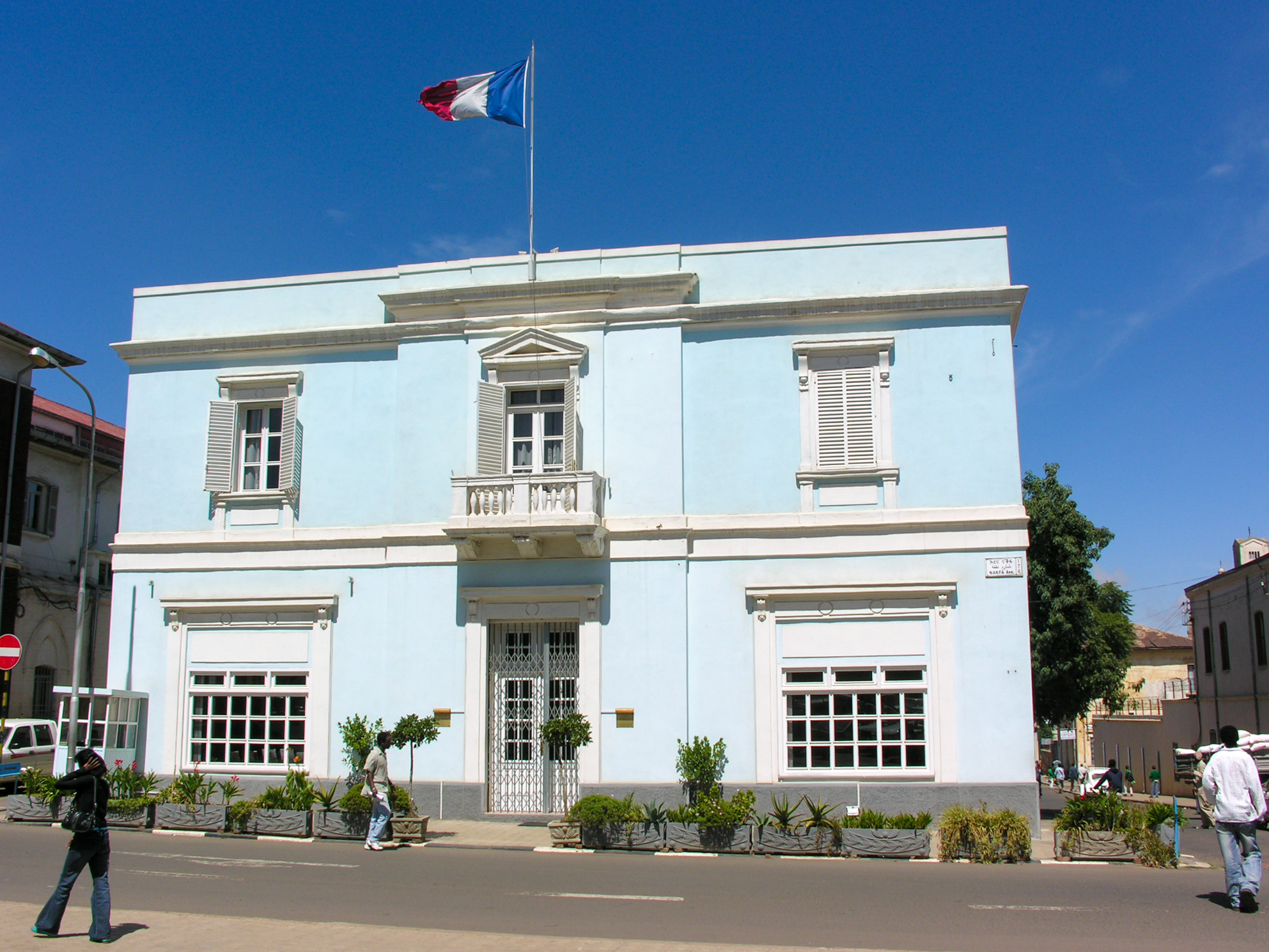
Embassy in Asmara

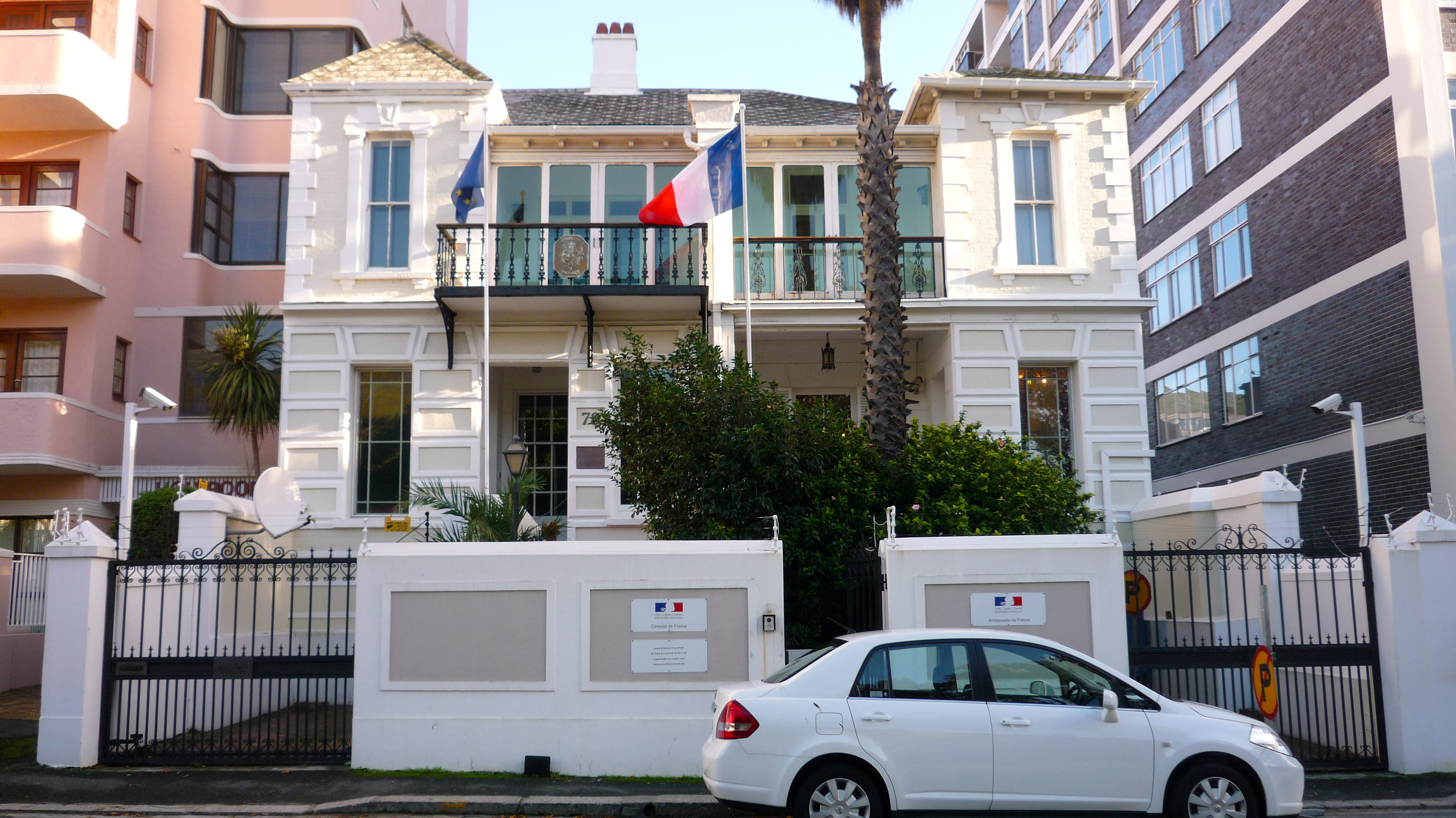
Consulate-General in Cape Town

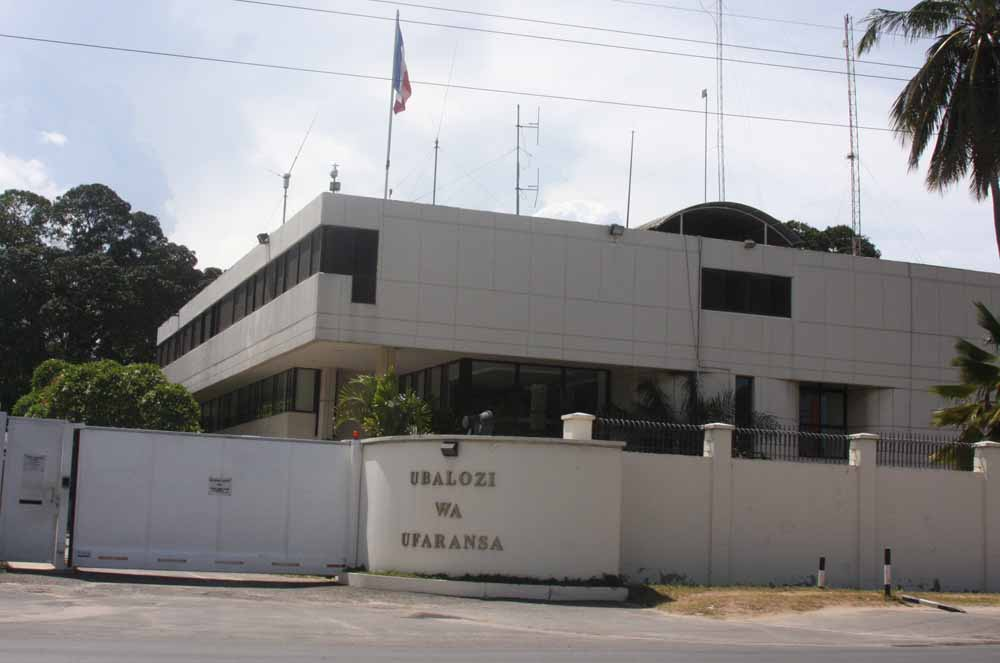
Embassy in Dar es Salaam

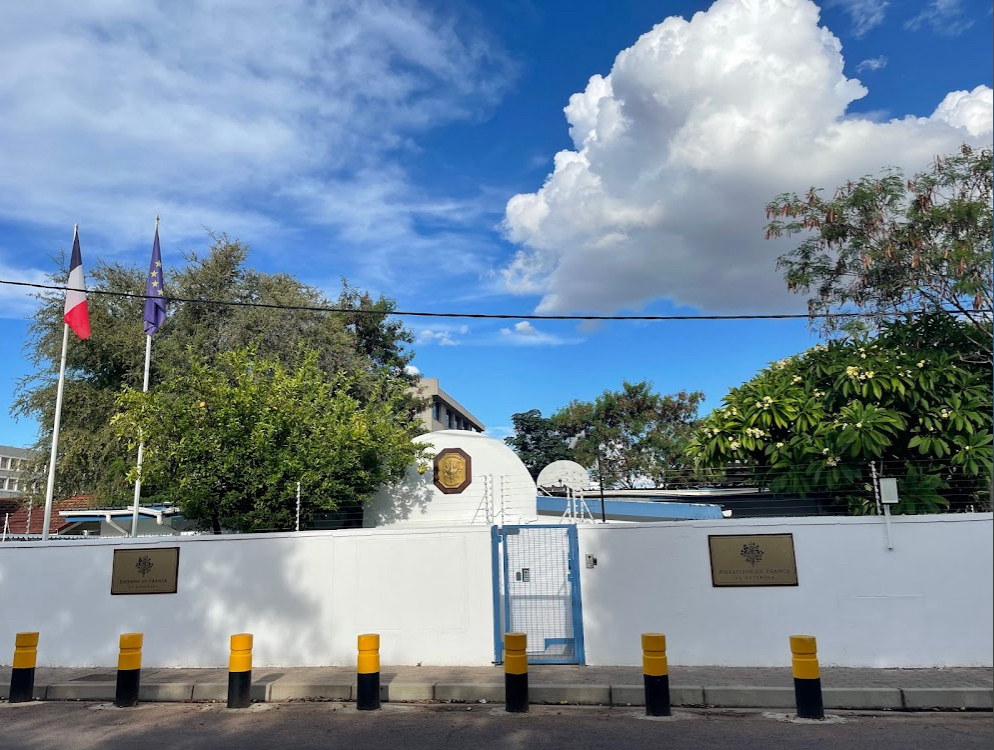
Embassy in Gaborone

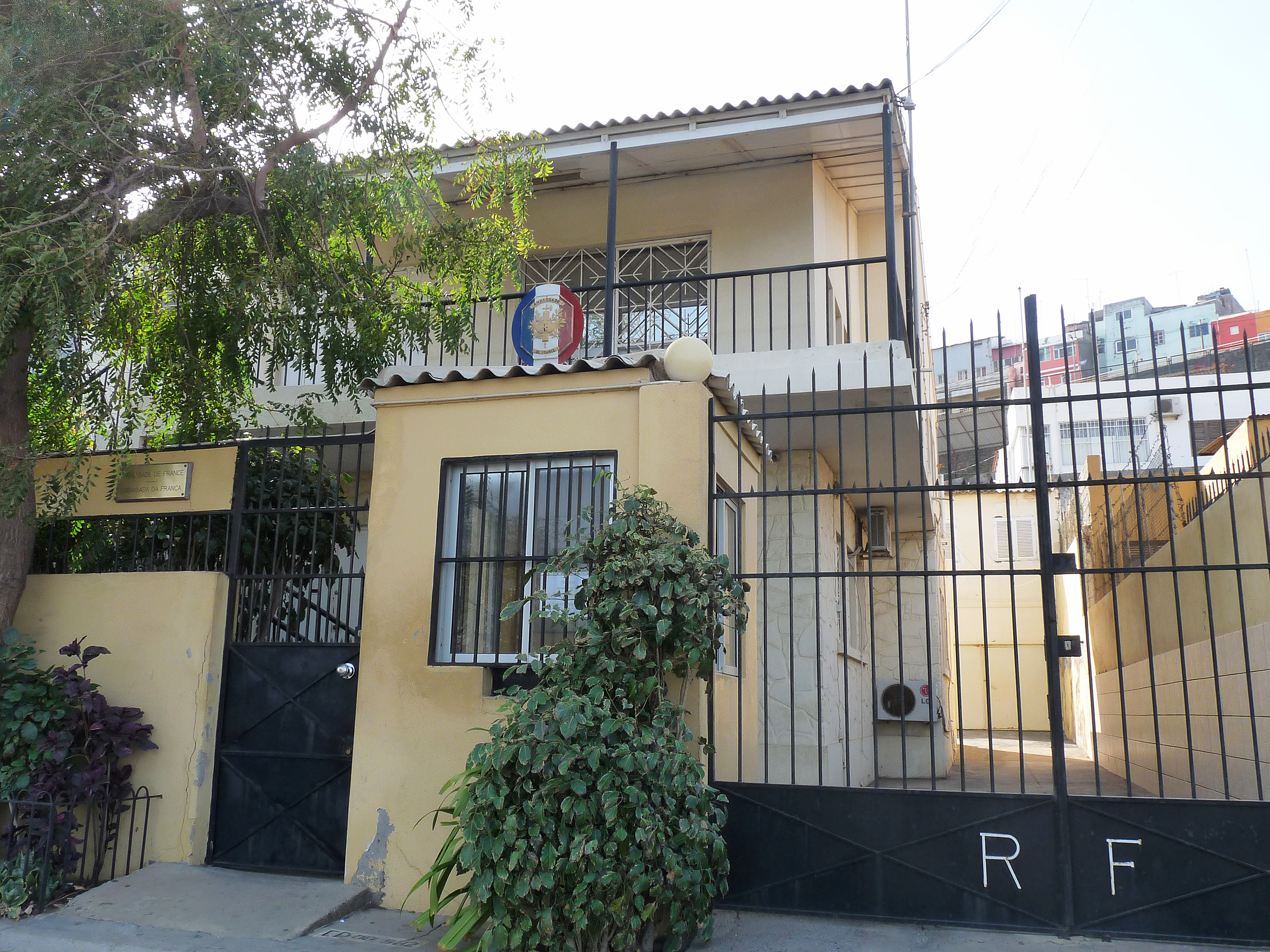
Embassy in Praia

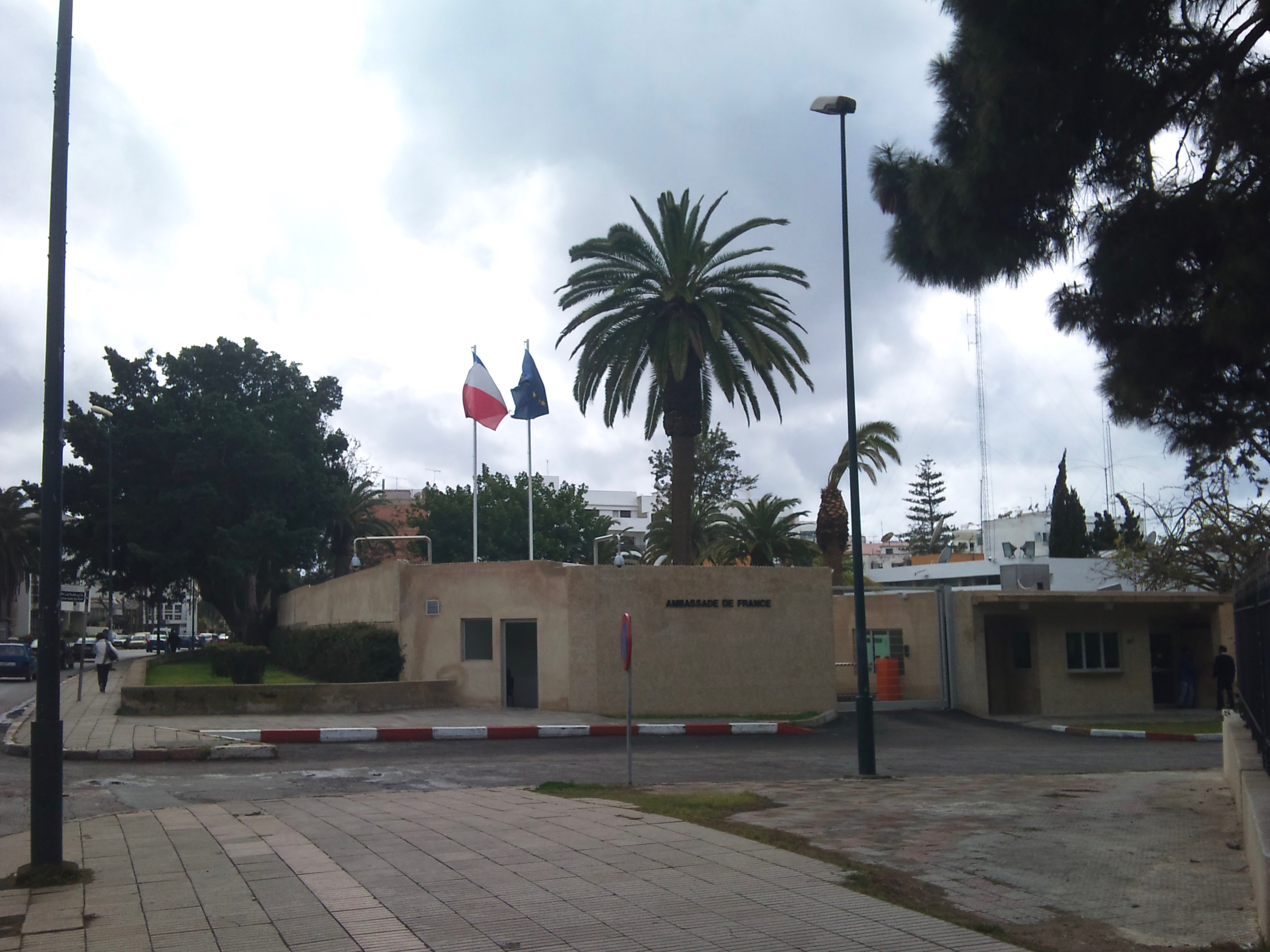
Embassy in Rabat

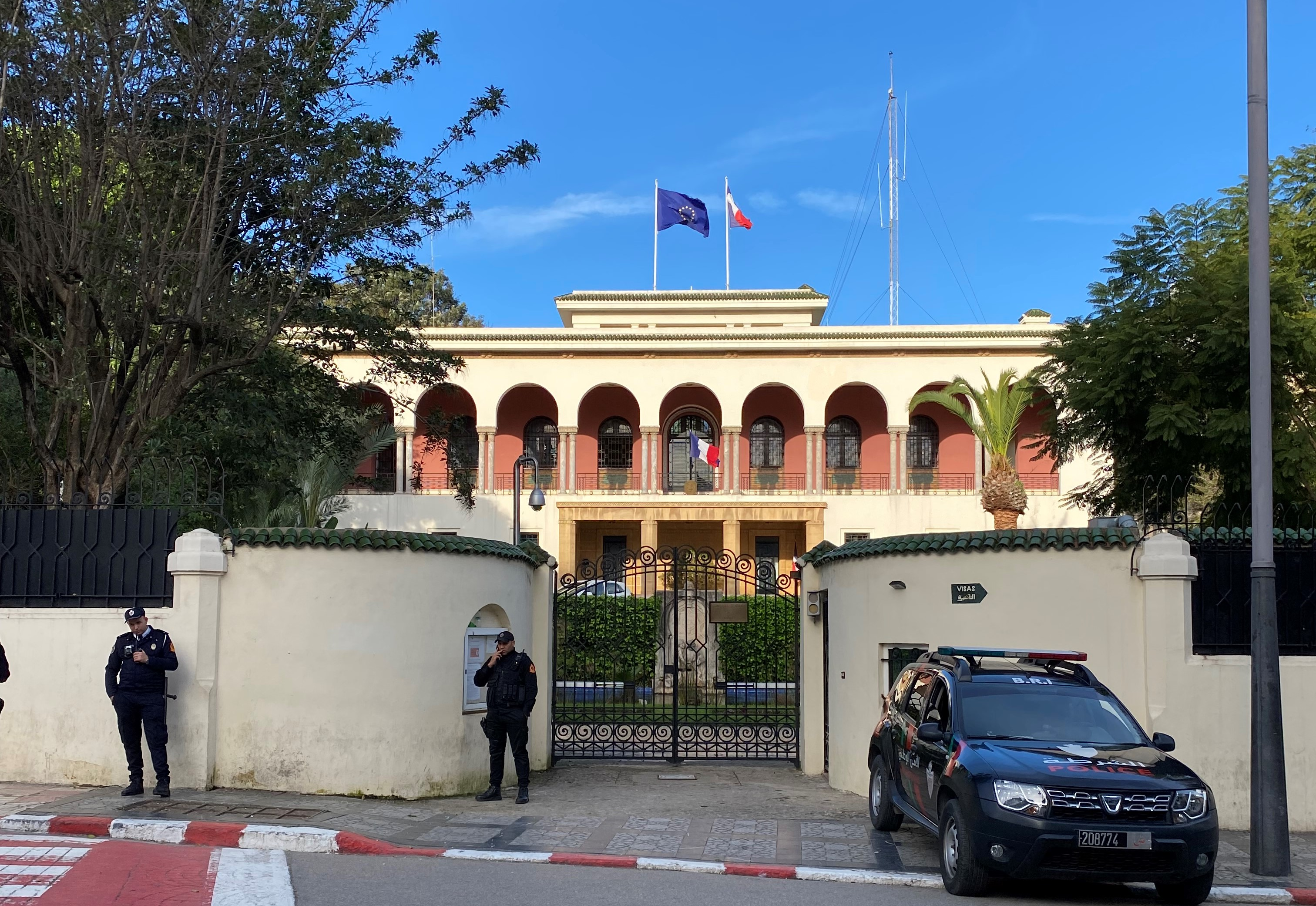
Consulate-General in Tangier

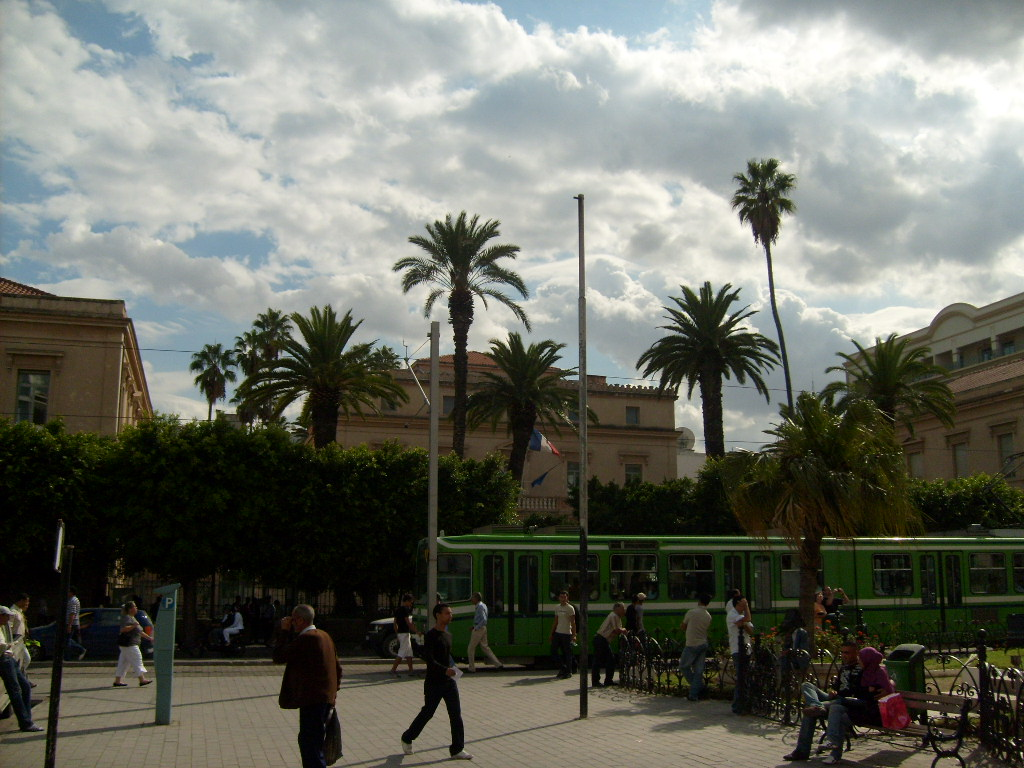
Embassy in Tunis

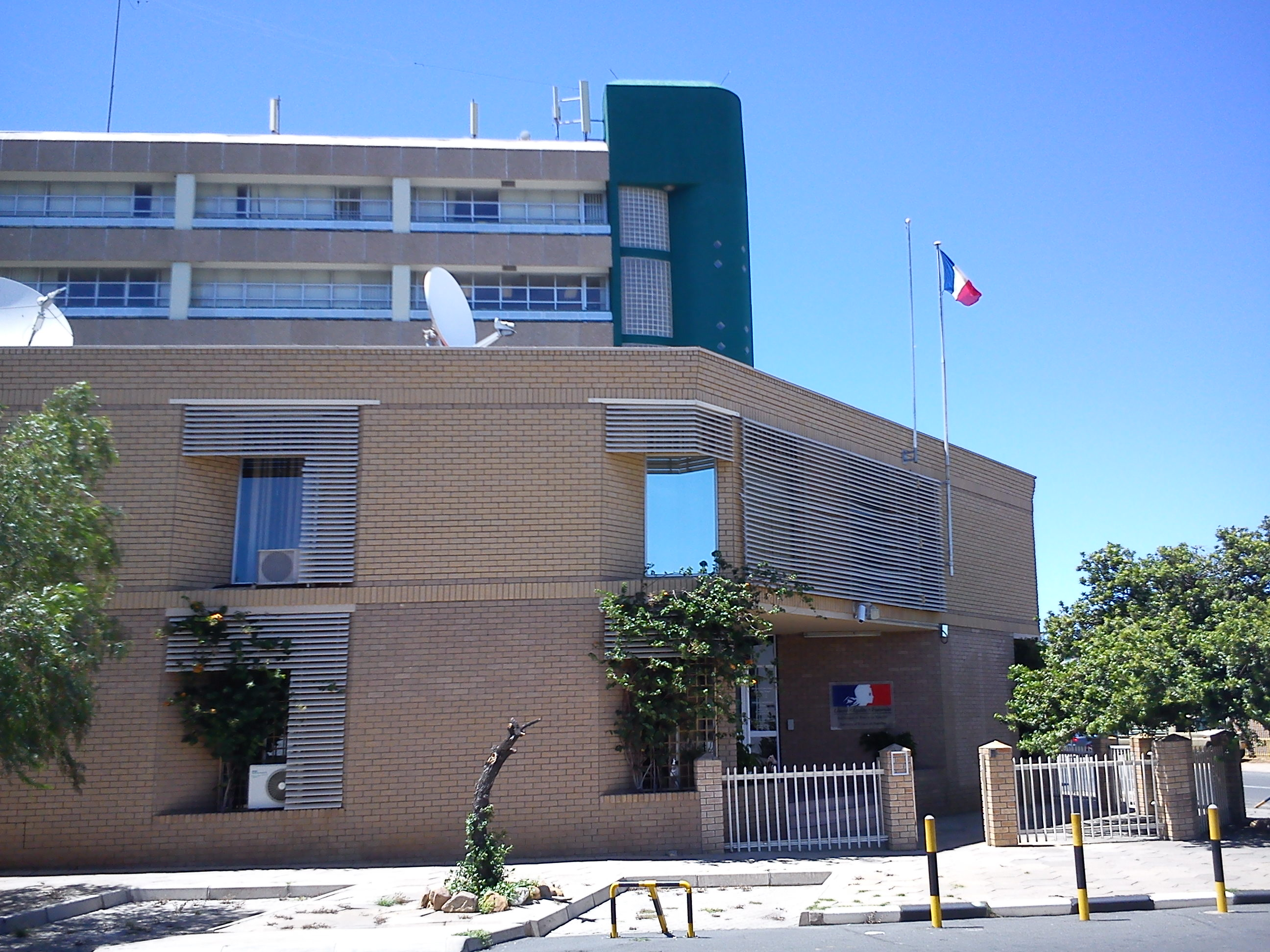
Embassy in Windhoek

=== Americas ===
Host country	Host city	Mission	Concurrent accreditation	Ref.
Argentina	Buenos Aires	Embassy		
Argentina	Buenos Aires	Consulate-General		
Bolivia	La Paz	Embassy		
Brazil	Brasília	Embassy		
Brazil	Recife	Consulate-General		
Brazil	Rio de Janeiro	Consulate-General		
Brazil	São Paulo	Consulate-General		
Canada	Ottawa	Embassy		
Canada	Moncton	Consulate-General		
Canada	Montreal	Consulate-General		
Canada	Quebec City	Consulate-General		
Canada	Toronto	Consulate-General		
Canada	Vancouver	Consulate-General		
Chile	Santiago de Chile	Embassy		
Colombia	Bogotá	Embassy		
Costa Rica	San José	Embassy		
Cuba	Havana	Embassy		
Dominican Republic	Santo Domingo	Embassy		
Ecuador	Quito	Embassy		
El Salvador	San Salvador	Embassy		
Guatemala	Guatemala City	Embassy	Country: Belize	
Guyana	Georgetown	Embassy		
Haiti	Port-au-Prince	Embassy		
Honduras	Tegucigalpa	Embassy		
Jamaica	Kingston	Embassy		
Mexico	Mexico City	Embassy		
Mexico	Mexico City	Consulate-General		
Mexico	Monterrey	Consulate-General		
Nicaragua	Managua	Embassy		
Panama	Panama City	Embassy	Country: Bahamas	
Paraguay	Asunción	Embassy		
Peru	Lima	Embassy		
Saint Lucia	Castries	Embassy	Countries: Antigua and Barbuda; Barbados; Dominica; Grenada; Saint Kitts and Nevis; Saint Vincent and the Grenadines; International Organization: Organisation of Eastern Caribbean States	
Suriname	Paramaribo	Embassy		
Trinidad and Tobago	Port of Spain	Embassy		
United States	Washington, D.C.	Embassy	International Organization: Organization of American States	
United States	Atlanta	Consulate-General	International Organization: Organization of American States	
United States	Boston	Consulate-General	International Organization: Organization of American States	
United States	Chicago	Consulate-General	International Organization: Organization of American States	
United States	Houston	Consulate-General	International Organization: Organization of American States	
United States	Los Angeles	Consulate-General	International Organization: Organization of American States	
United States	Miami	Consulate-General	International Organization: Organization of American States	
United States	New Orleans	Consulate-General	International Organization: Organization of American States	
United States	New York City	Consulate-General	International Organization: Organization of American States	
United States	San Francisco	Consulate-General	International Organization: Organization of American States	
Uruguay	Montevideo	Embassy		
Venezuela	Caracas	Embassy		

Embassy in Asunción

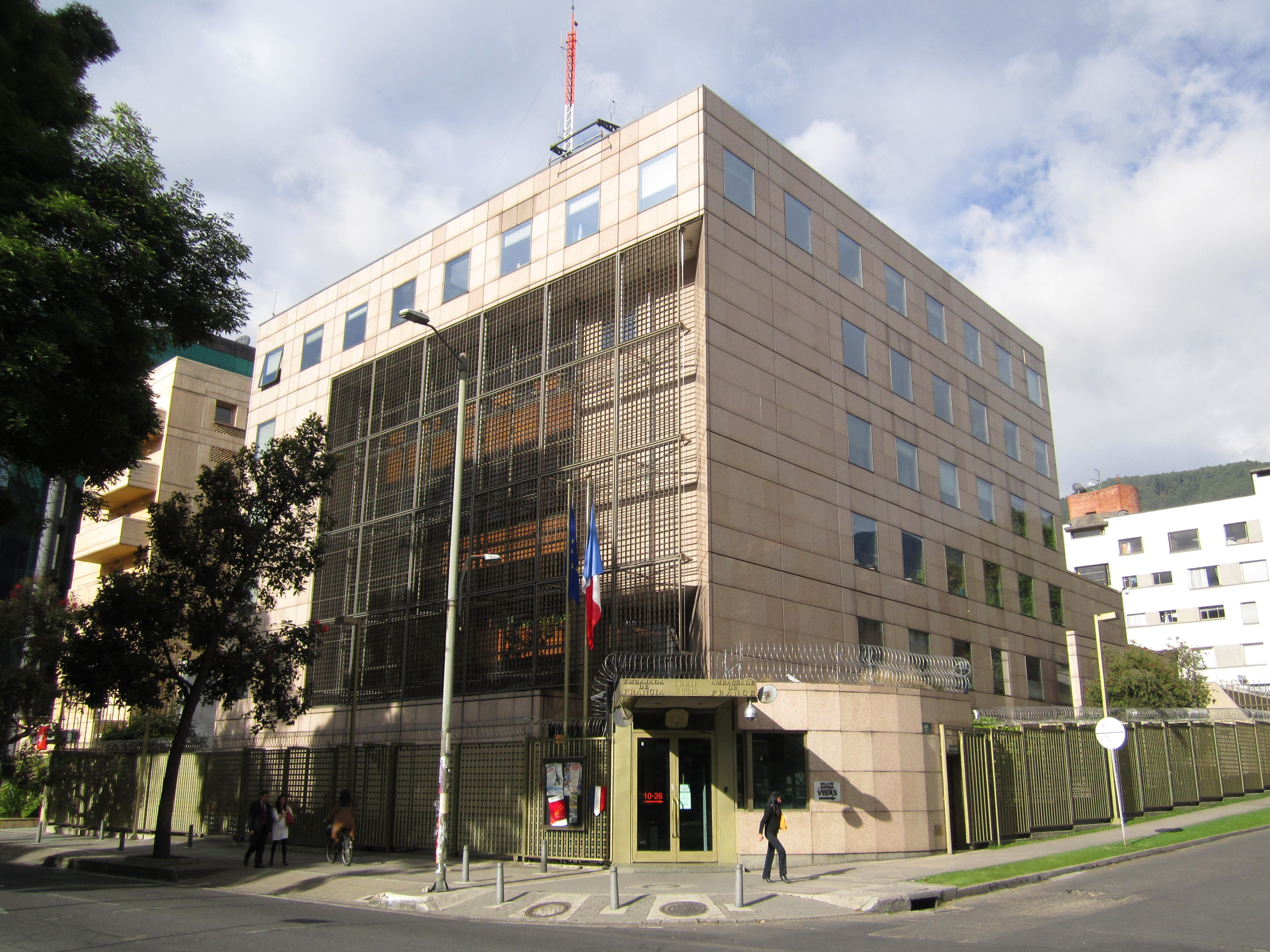
Embassy in Bogotá

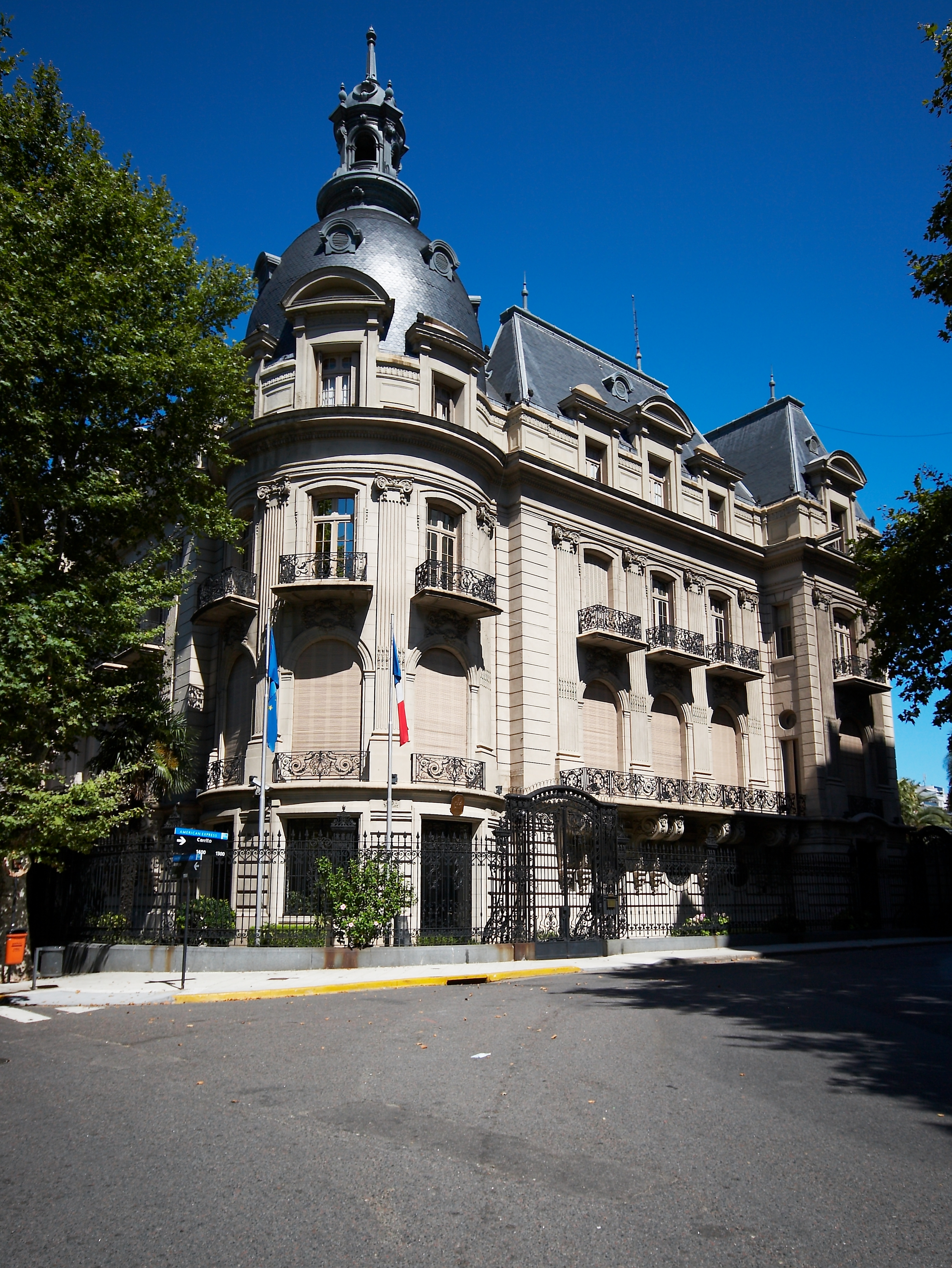
Embassy in Buenos Aires

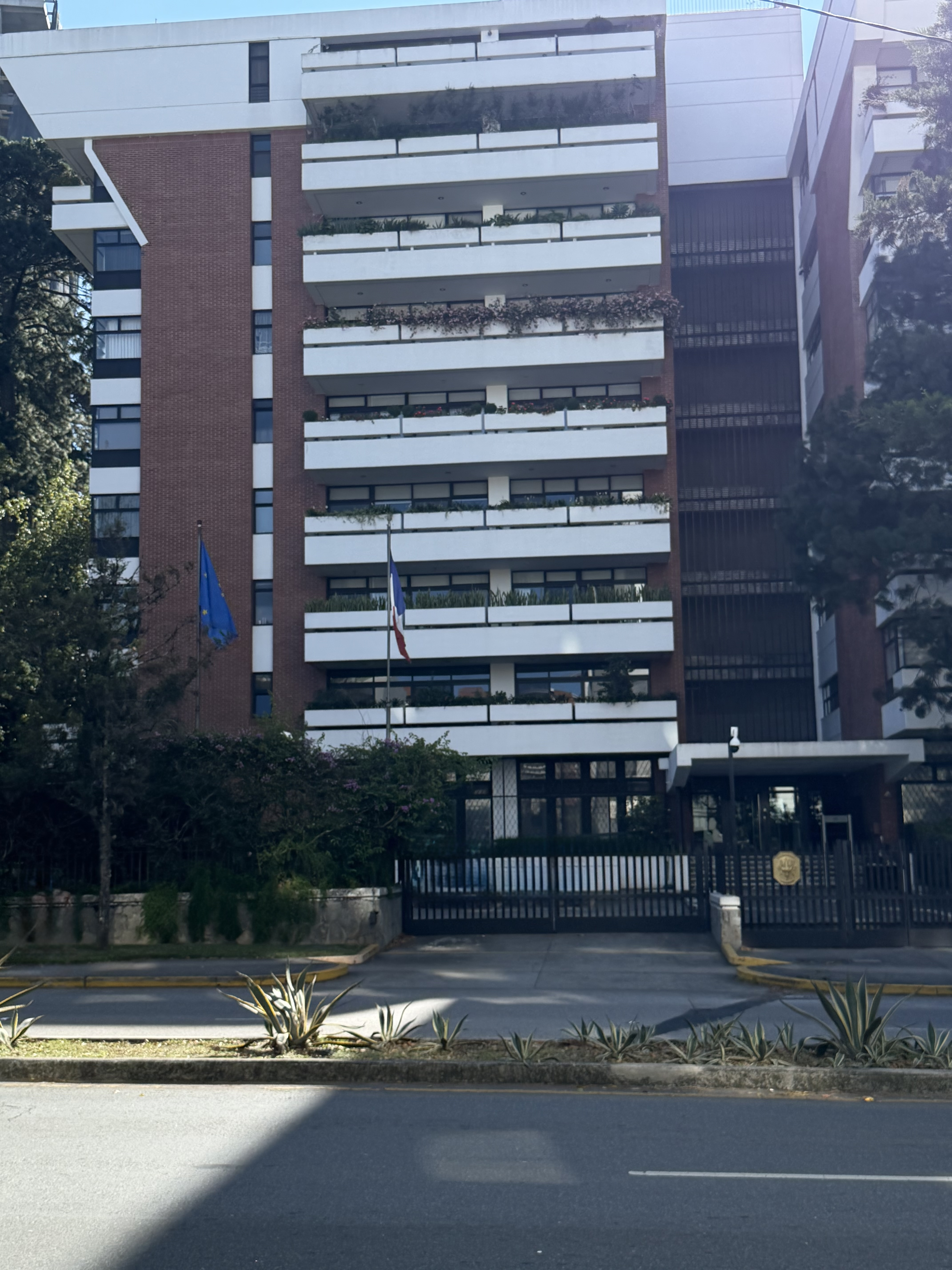
Building hosting the Embassy in Guatemala City

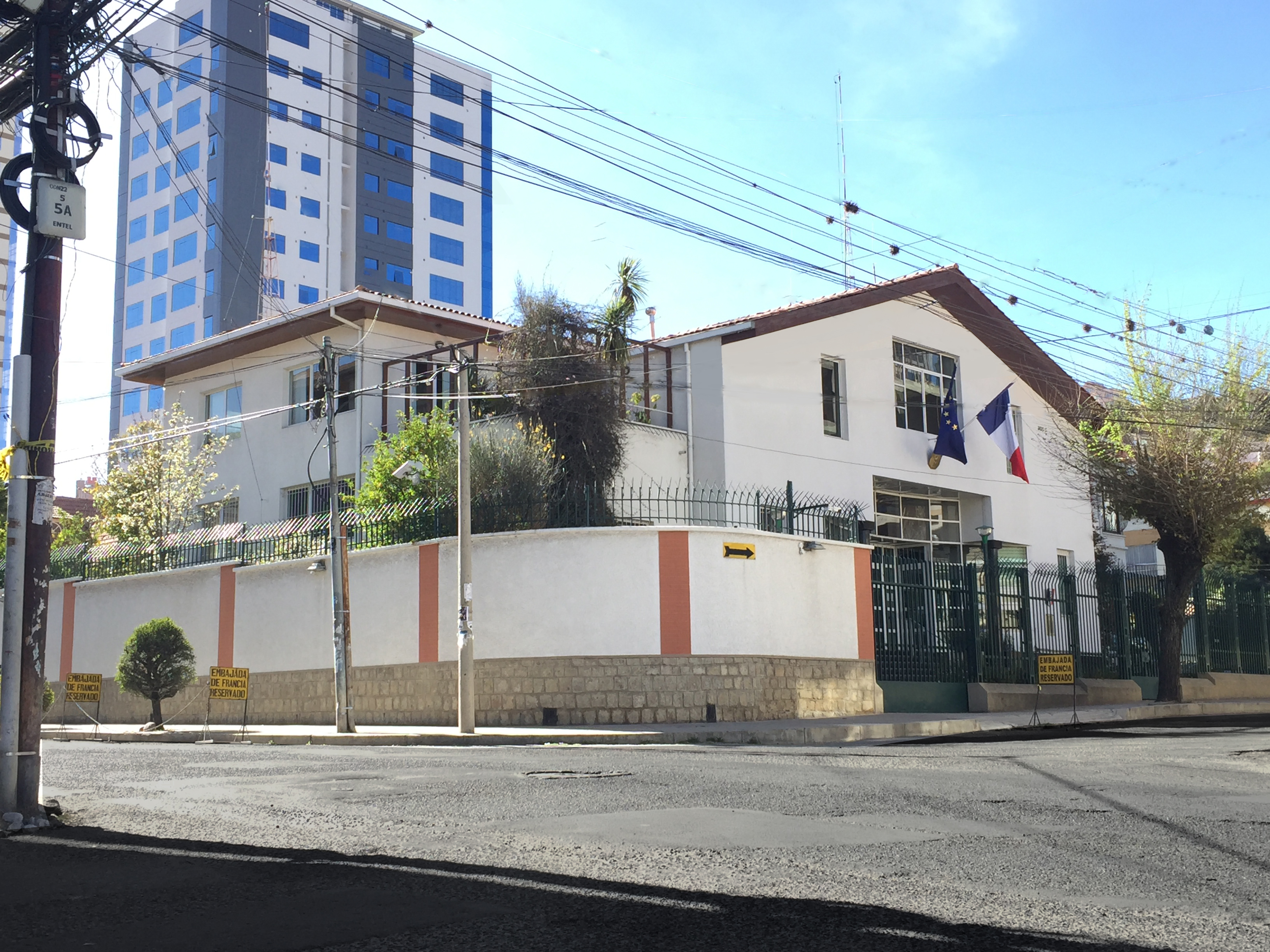
Embassy in La Paz

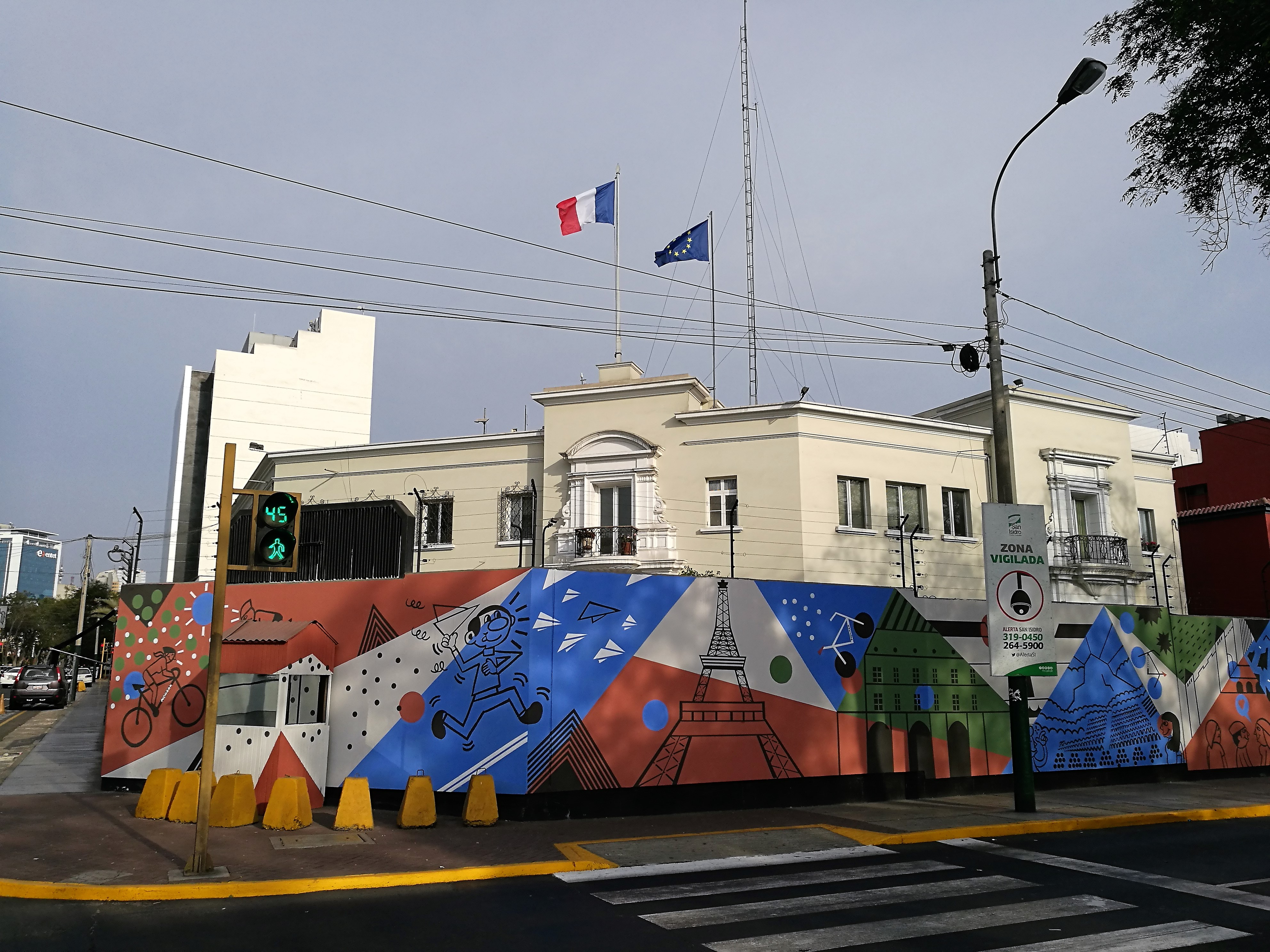
Embassy in Lima

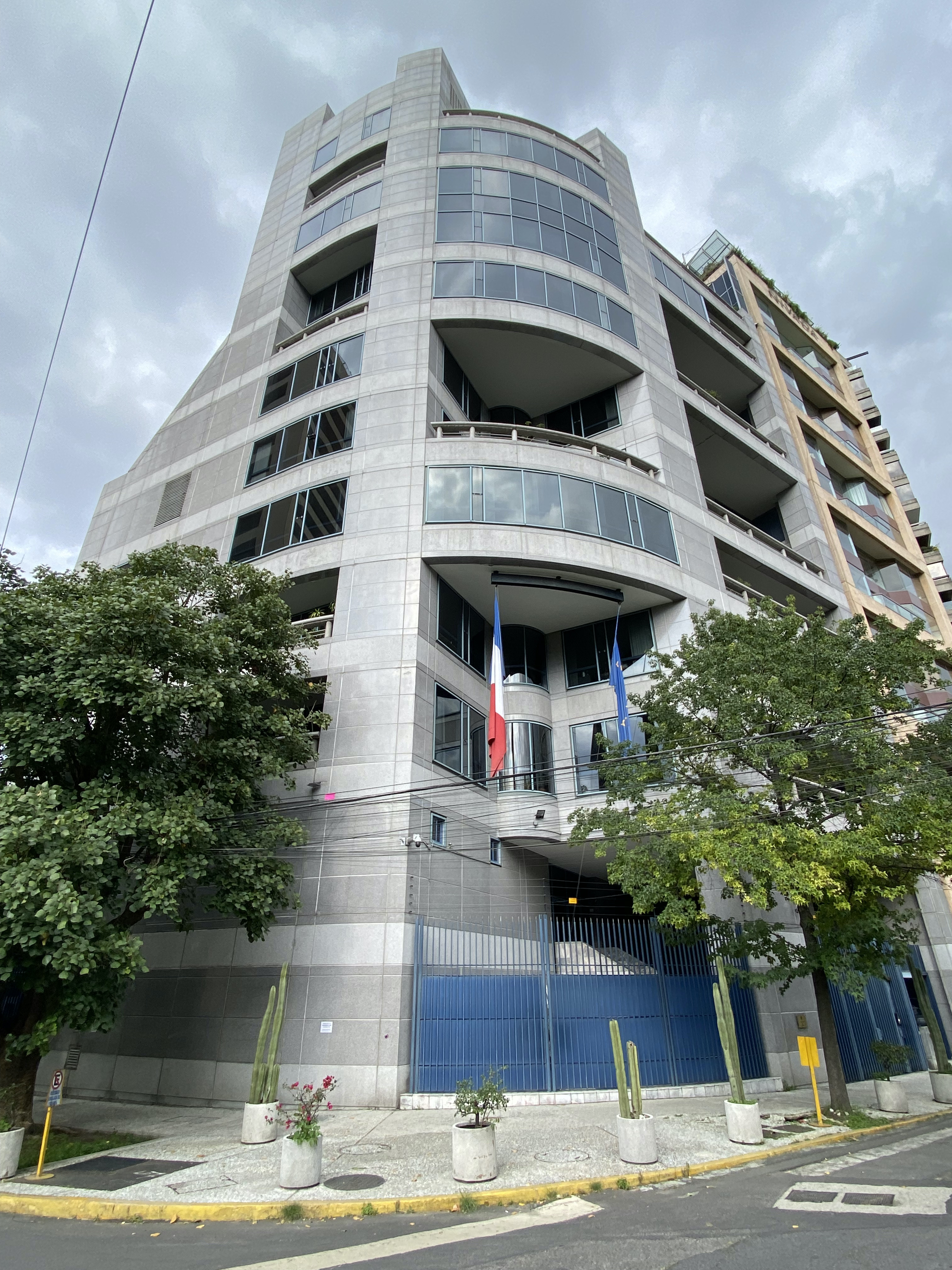
Embassy in Mexico City

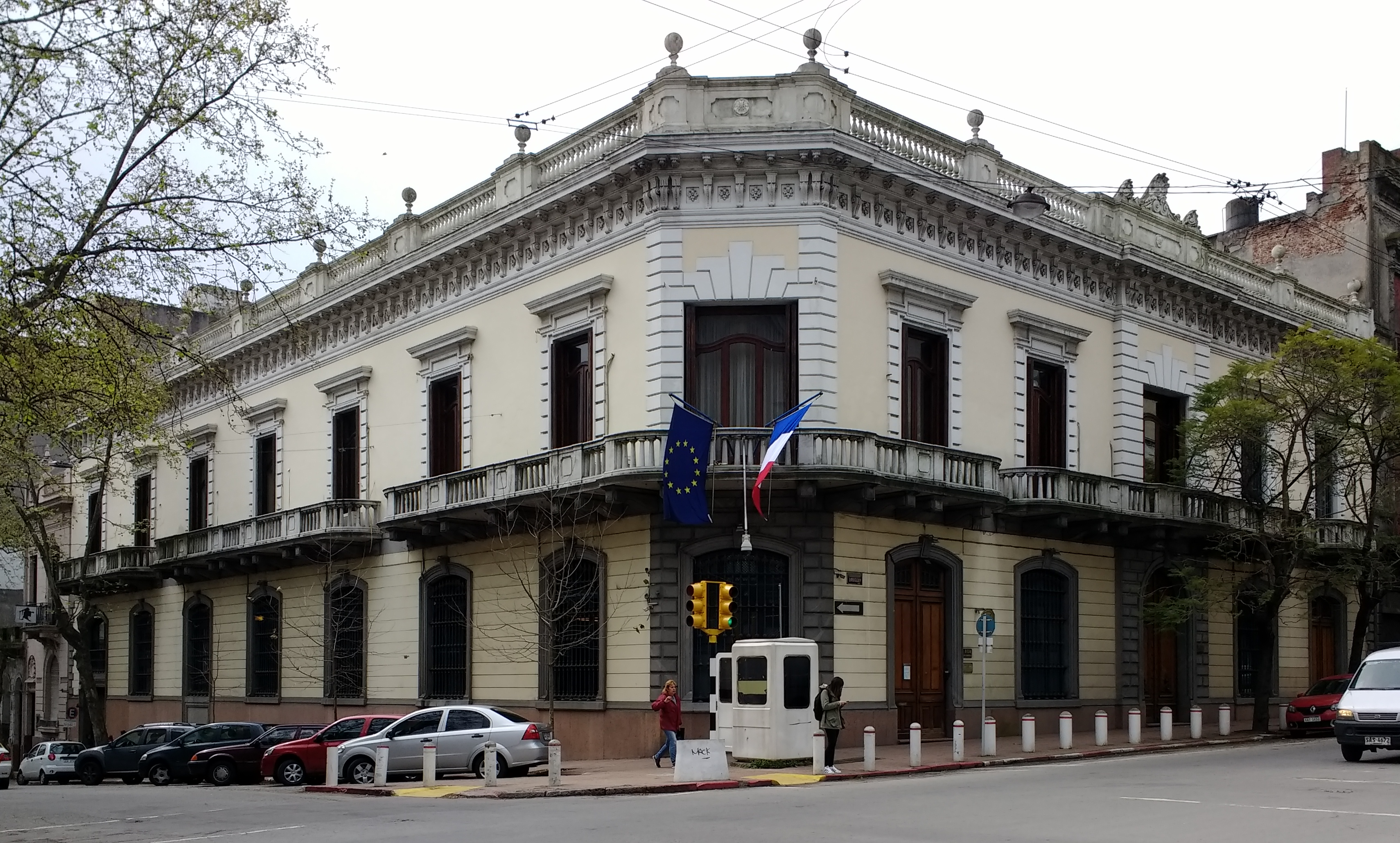
Embassy in Montevideo

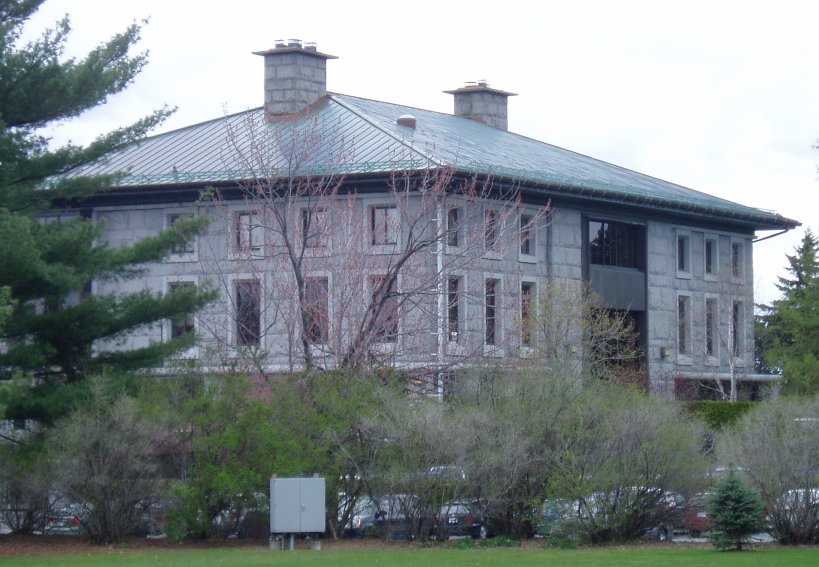
Embassy in Ottawa

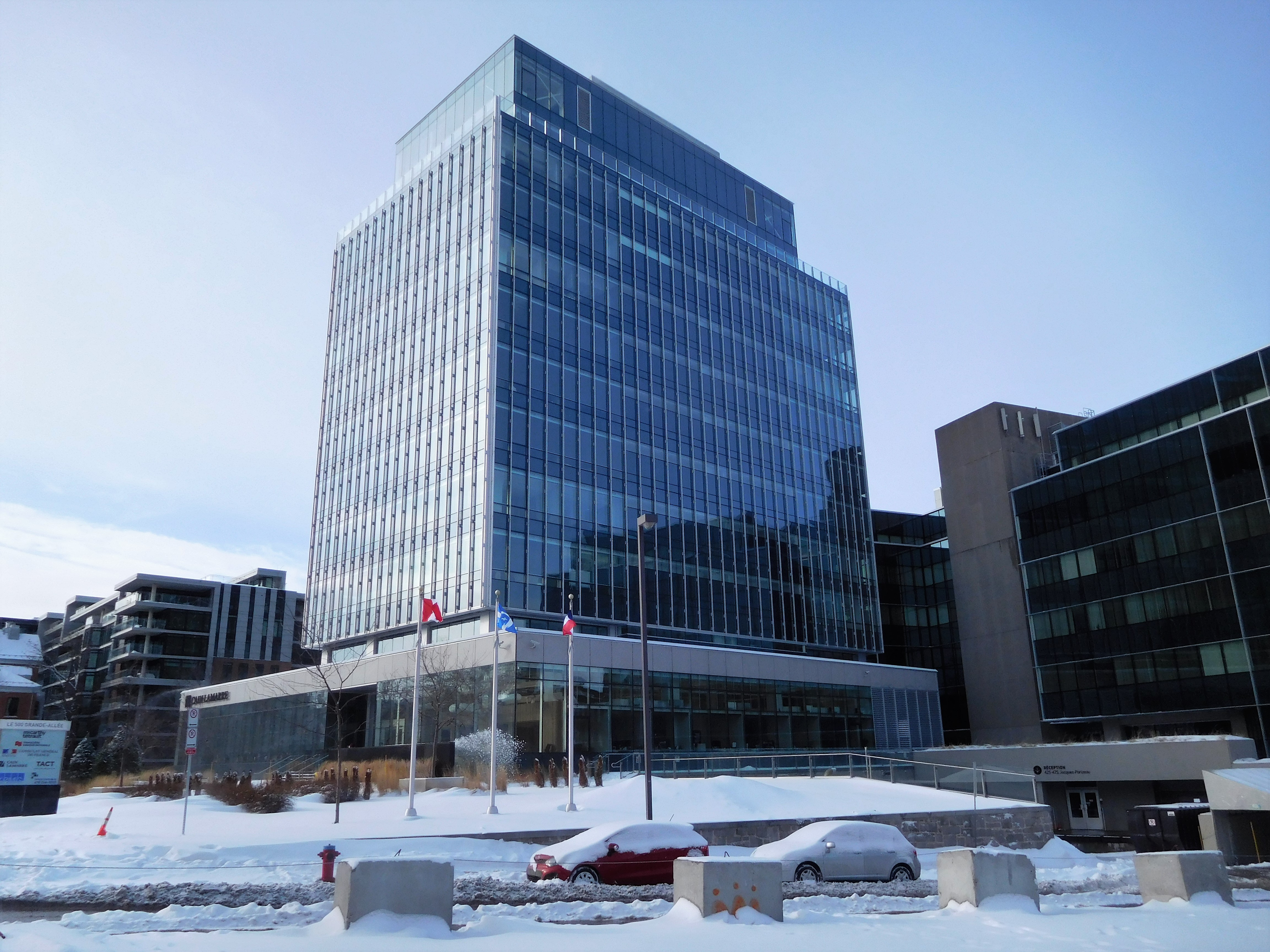
Building hosting the Consulate-General in Quebec City

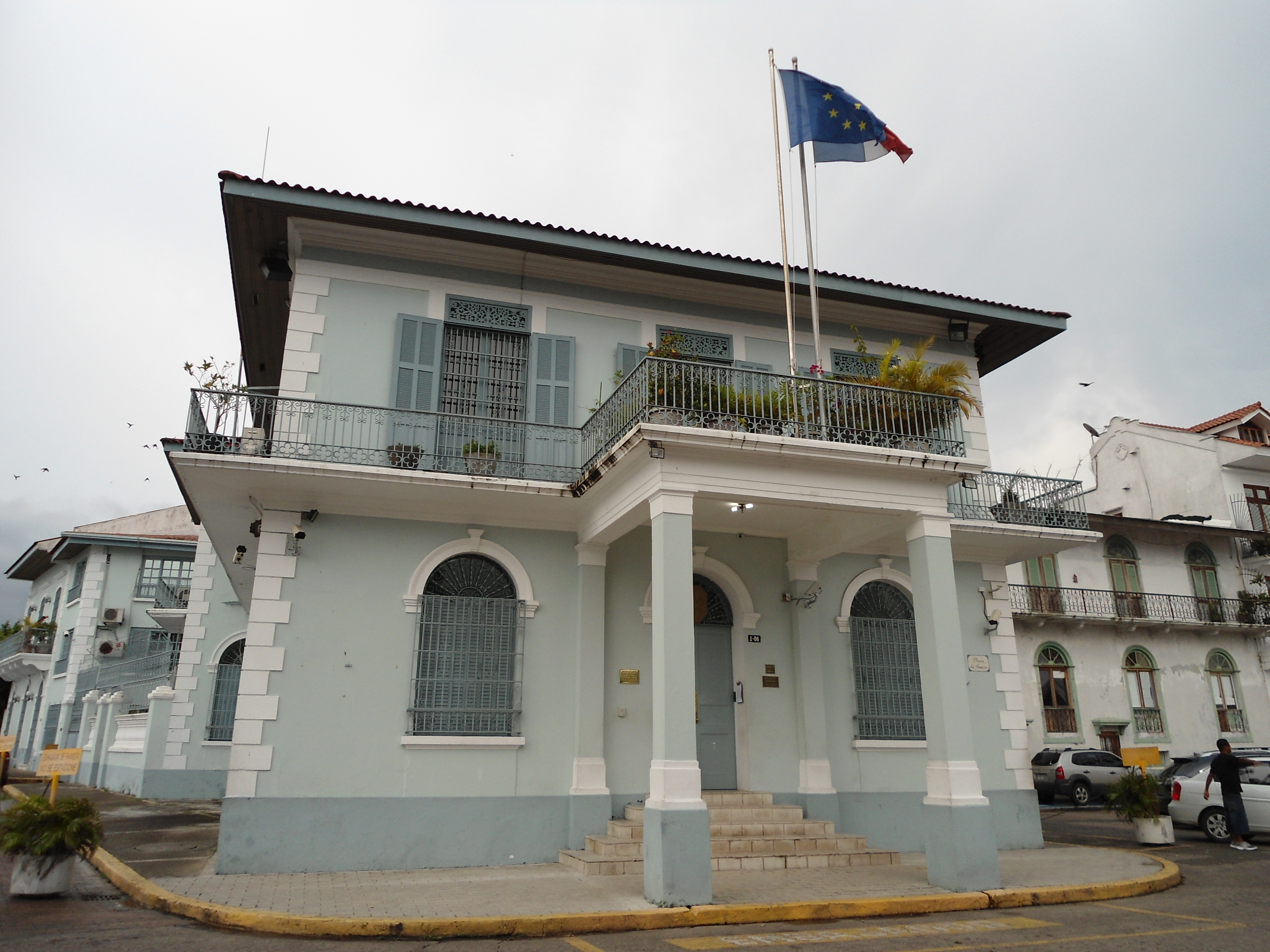
Embassy in Panama City

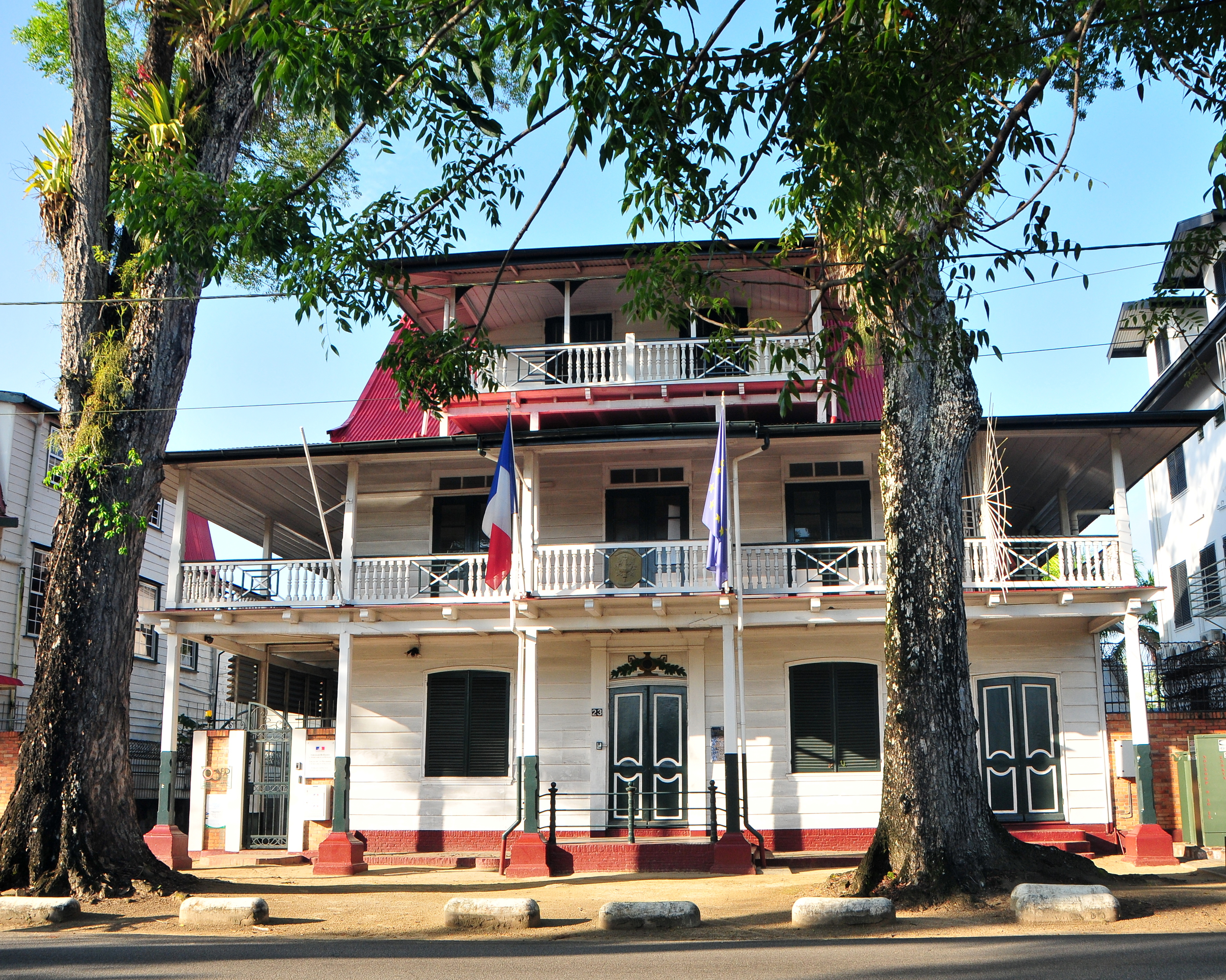
Embassy in Paramaribo

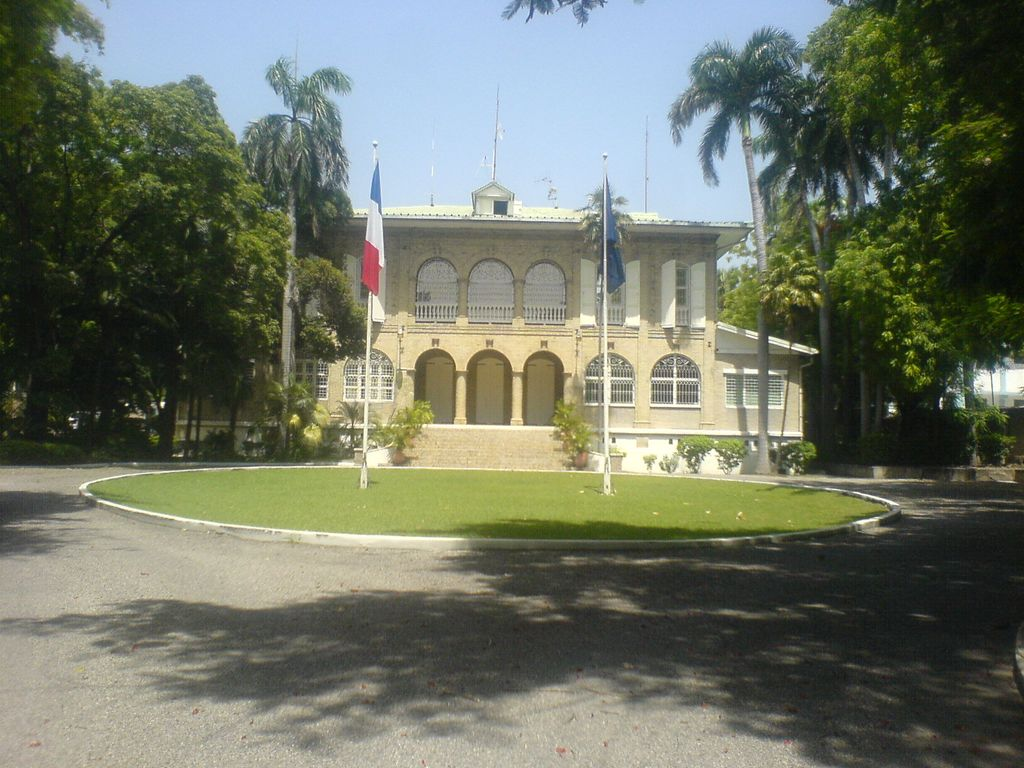
Embassy in Port-au-Prince

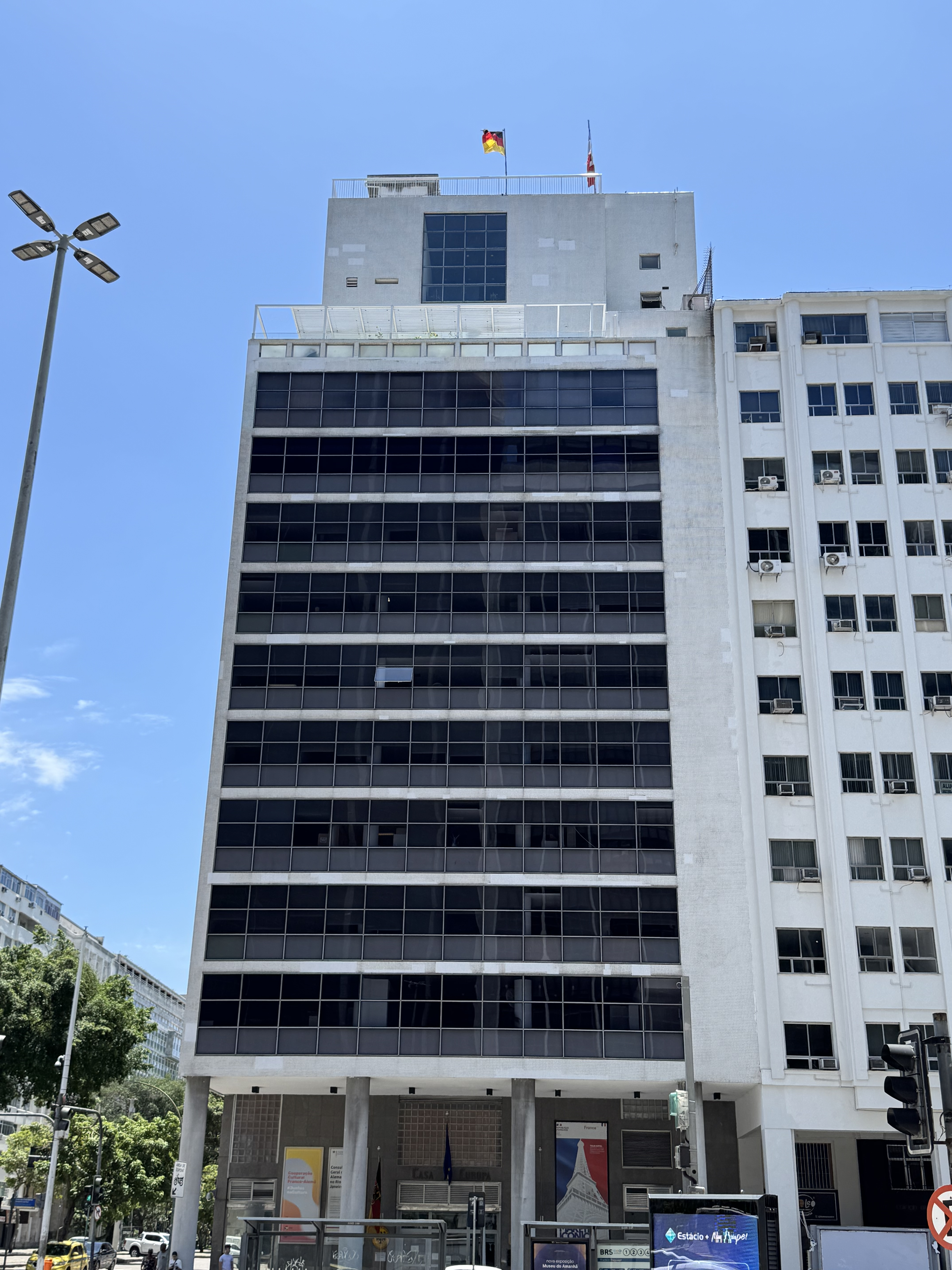
Building hosting the Consulate-General in Rio de Janeiro

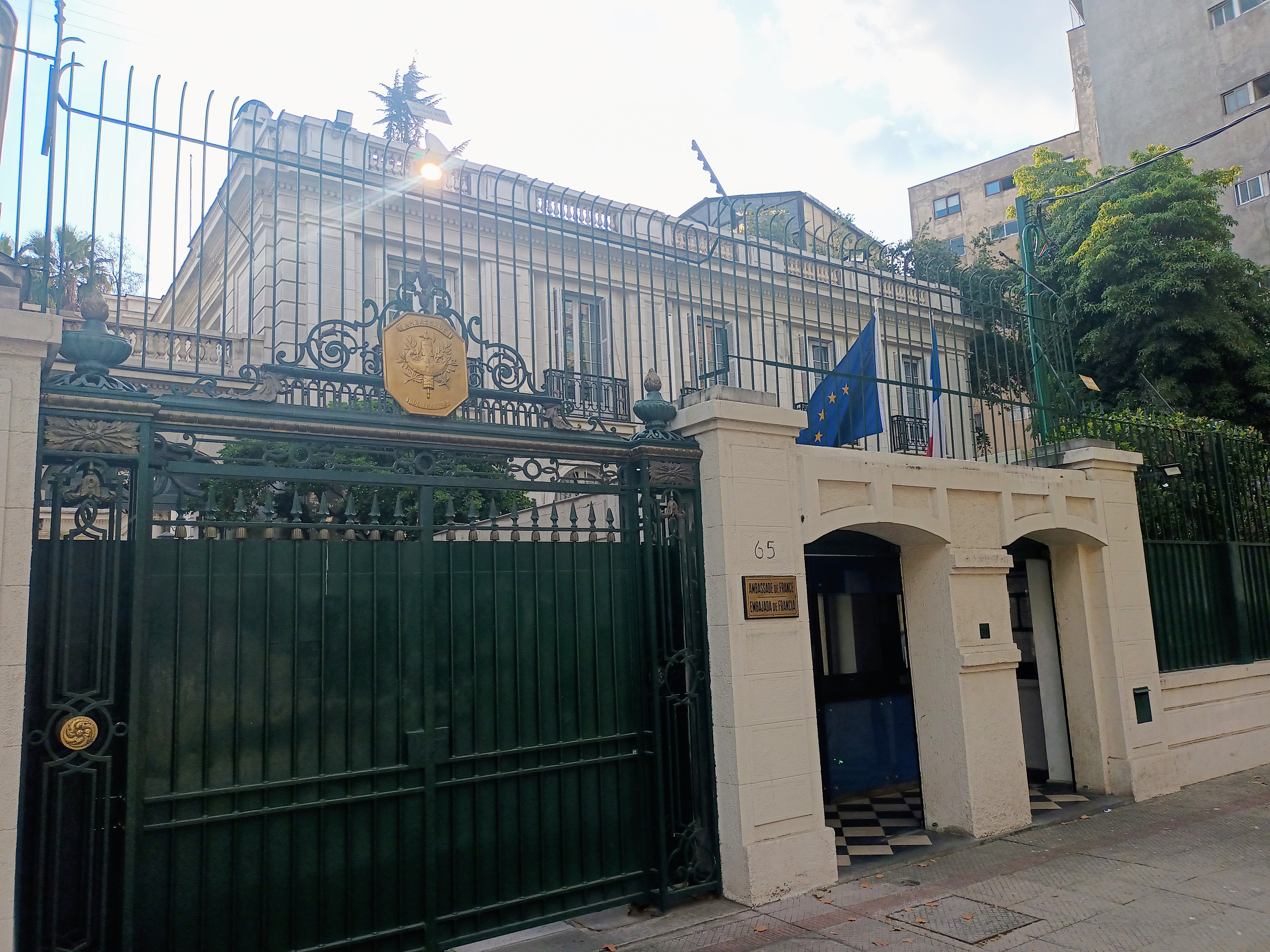
Embassy in Santiago

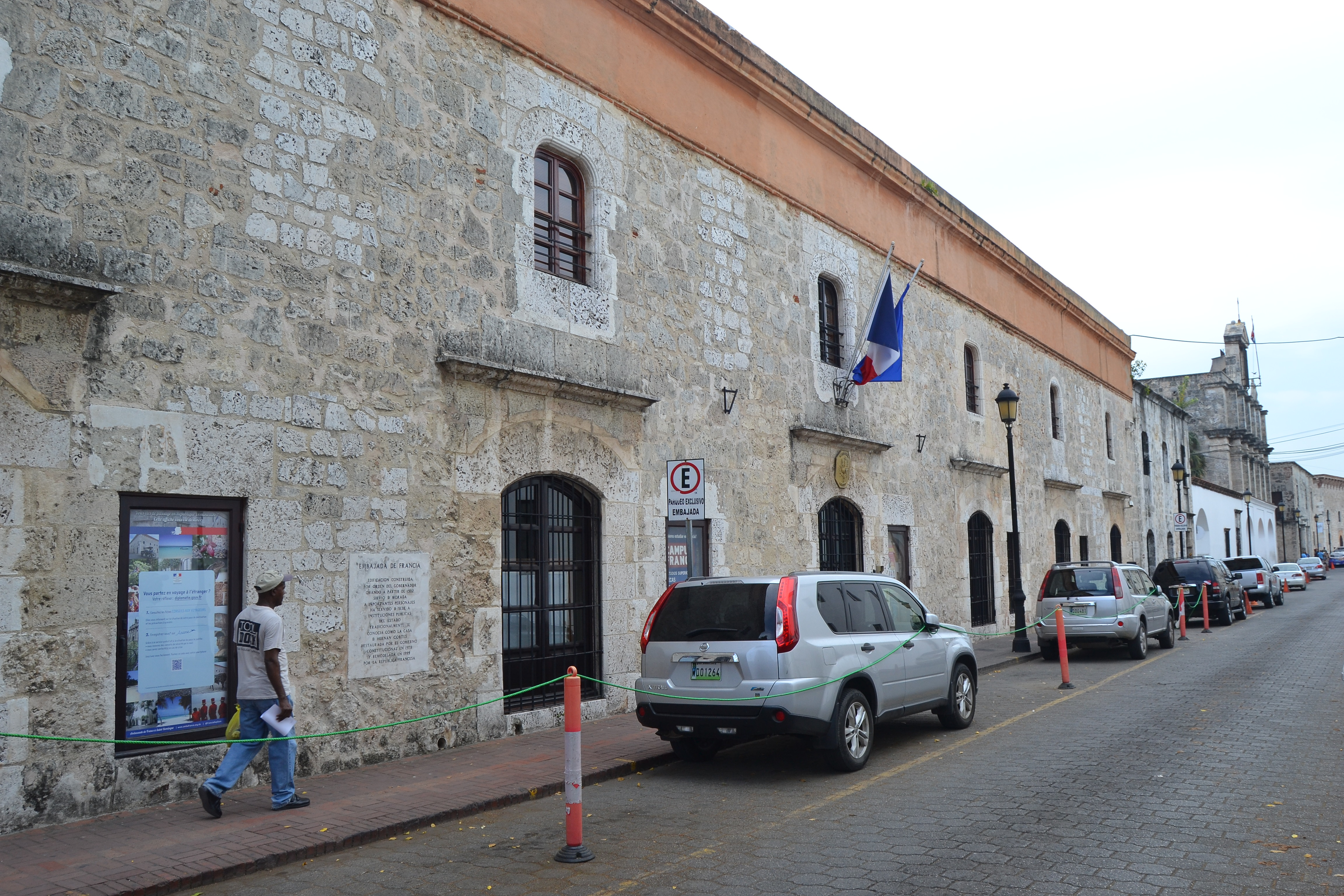
Embassy in Santo Domingo

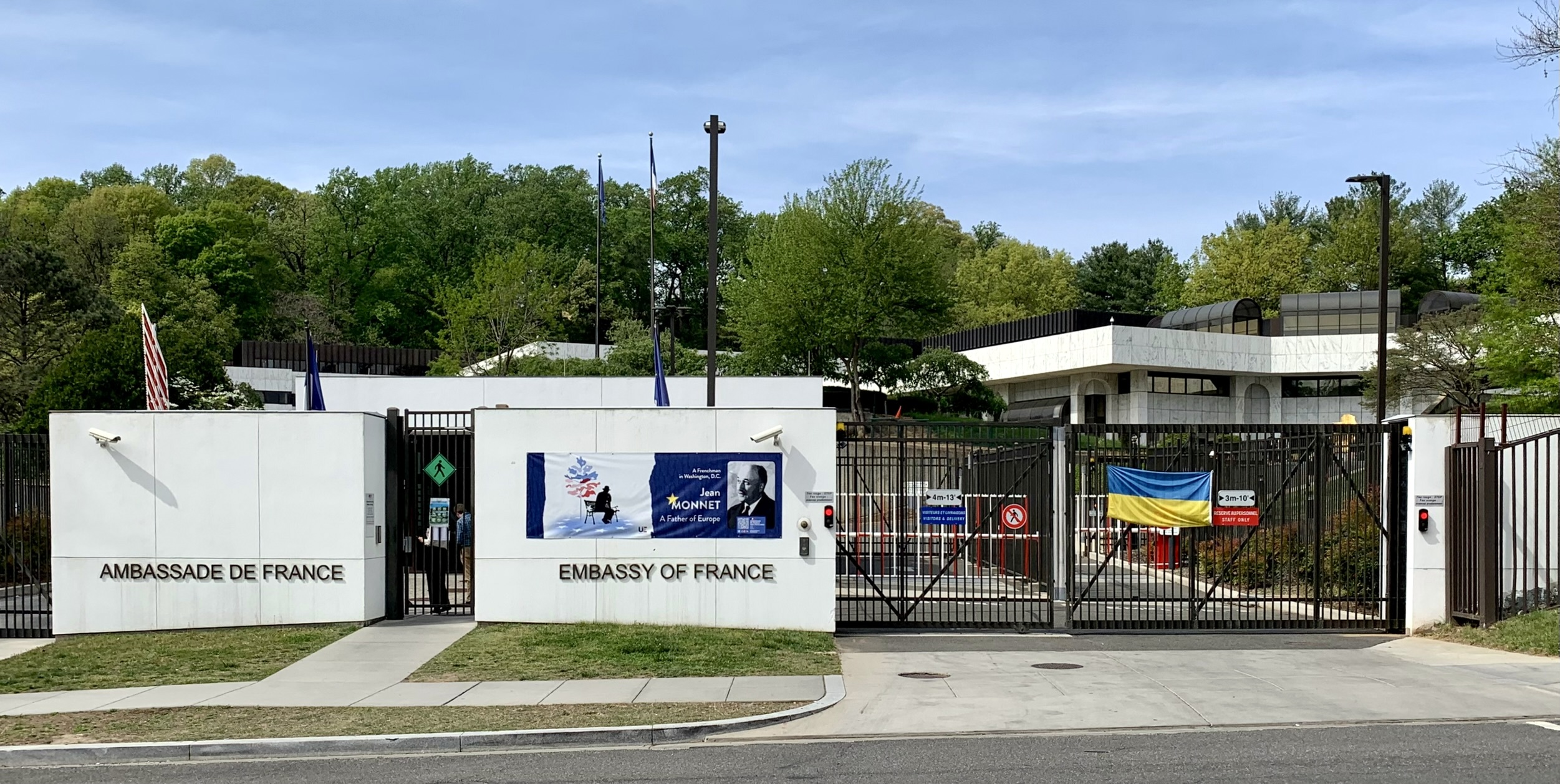
Embassy in Washington, D.C.

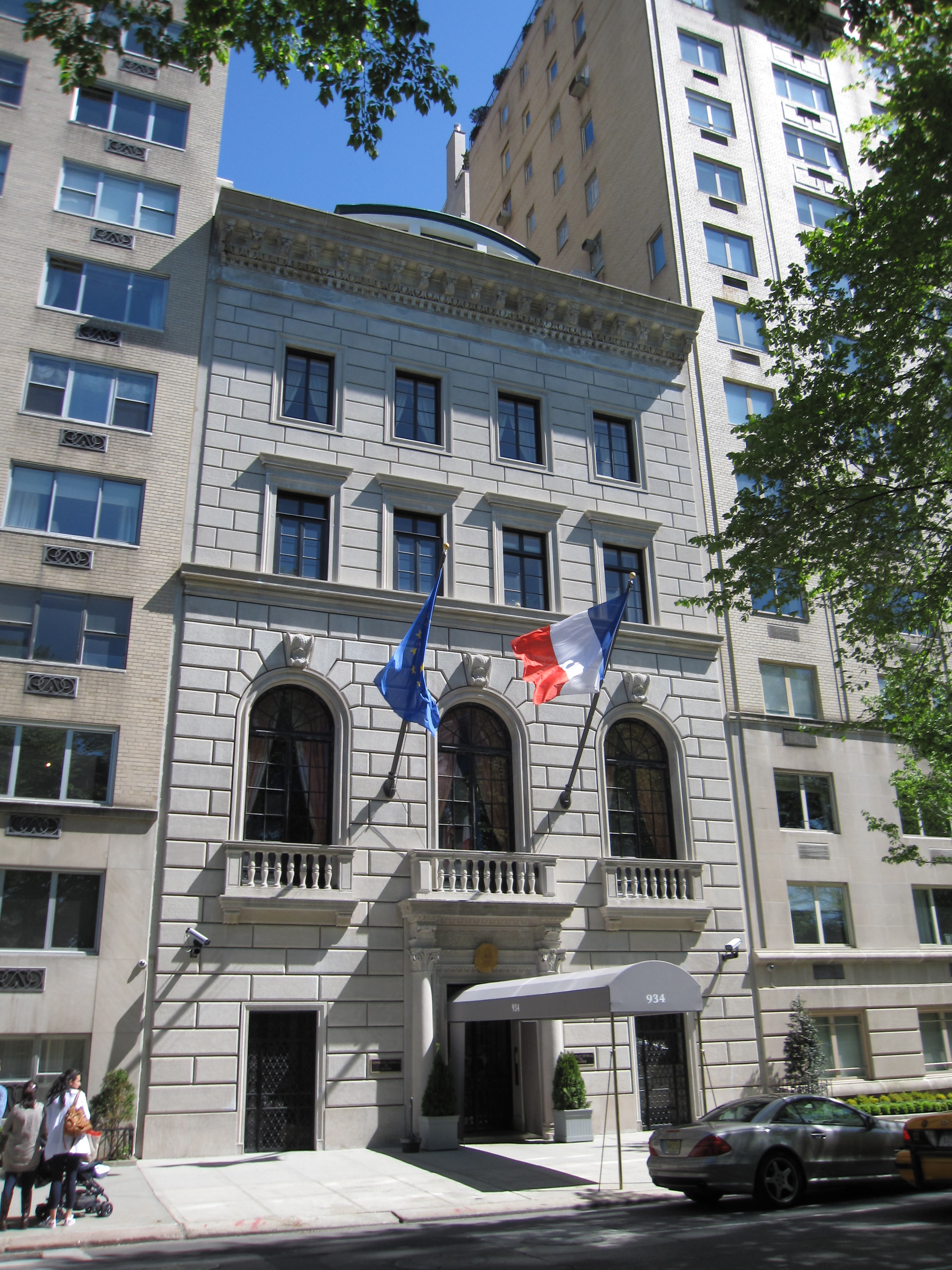
Consulate-General in New York City

=== Asia ===
Host country	Host city	Mission	Concurrent accreditation	Ref.
Armenia	Yerevan	Embassy		
Azerbaijan	Baku	Embassy		
Bahrain	Manama	Embassy		
Bangladesh	Dhaka	Embassy		
Brunei	Bandar Seri Begawan	Embassy		
Cambodia	Phnom Penh	Embassy		
China	Beijing	Embassy		
China	Chengdu	Consulate-General		
China	Guangzhou	Consulate-General		
China	Hong Kong	Consulate-General		
China	Shanghai	Consulate-General		
China	Shenyang	Consulate-General		
China	Wuhan	Consulate-General		
Georgia	Tbilisi	Embassy		
India	New Delhi	Embassy	Country: Bhutan	
India	Bangalore	Consulate-General	Country: Bhutan	
India	Kolkata	Consulate-General	Country: Bhutan	
India	Mumbai	Consulate-General	Country: Bhutan	
India	Pondicherry	Consulate-General	Country: Bhutan	
Indonesia	Jakarta	Embassy	Country: Timor-Leste; International Organization: Association of Southeast Asian Nations	
Iran	Tehran	Embassy		
Iraq	Baghdad	Embassy		
Iraq	Erbil	Consulate-General		
Israel	Tel Aviv	Embassy		
Israel	Haifa	Consulate-General		
Japan	Tokyo	Embassy		
Japan	Kyoto	Consulate-General		
Jordan	Amman	Embassy		
Kazakhstan	Astana	Embassy		
Kazakhstan	Almaty	Consulate-General		
Kuwait	Kuwait City	Embassy		
Kyrgyzstan	Bishkek	Embassy		
Laos	Vientiane	Embassy		
Lebanon	Beirut	Embassy		
Malaysia	Kuala Lumpur	Embassy		
Mongolia	Ulaanbaatar	Embassy		
Myanmar	Yangon	Embassy		
Nepal	Kathmandu	Embassy		
Oman	Muscat	Embassy		
Pakistan	Islamabad	Embassy		
Pakistan	Karachi	Consulate-General		
Palestine	Jerusalem	Consulate-General		
Philippines	Manila	Embassy	Countries: Marshall Islands; Federated States of Micronesia; Palau	
Qatar	Doha	Embassy		
Saudi Arabia	Riyadh	Embassy		
Saudi Arabia	Jeddah	Consulate-General		
Singapore	Singapore	Embassy		
South Korea	Seoul	Embassy		
Sri Lanka	Colombo	Embassy	Country: Maldives	
Syria	Damascus	Embassy		
Republic of China (Taiwan)	Taipei	Office		
Tajikistan	Dushanbe	Embassy		
Thailand	Bangkok	Embassy	International Organization: United Nations Economic and Social Commission for Asia and the Pacific	
Turkey	Ankara	Embassy		
Turkey	Istanbul	Consulate-General		
Turkmenistan	Ashgabat	Embassy		
United Arab Emirates	Abu Dhabi	Embassy		
United Arab Emirates	Dubai	Consulate-General		
Uzbekistan	Tashkent	Embassy		
Vietnam	Hanoi	Embassy		
Vietnam	Ho Chi Minh City	Consulate-General		

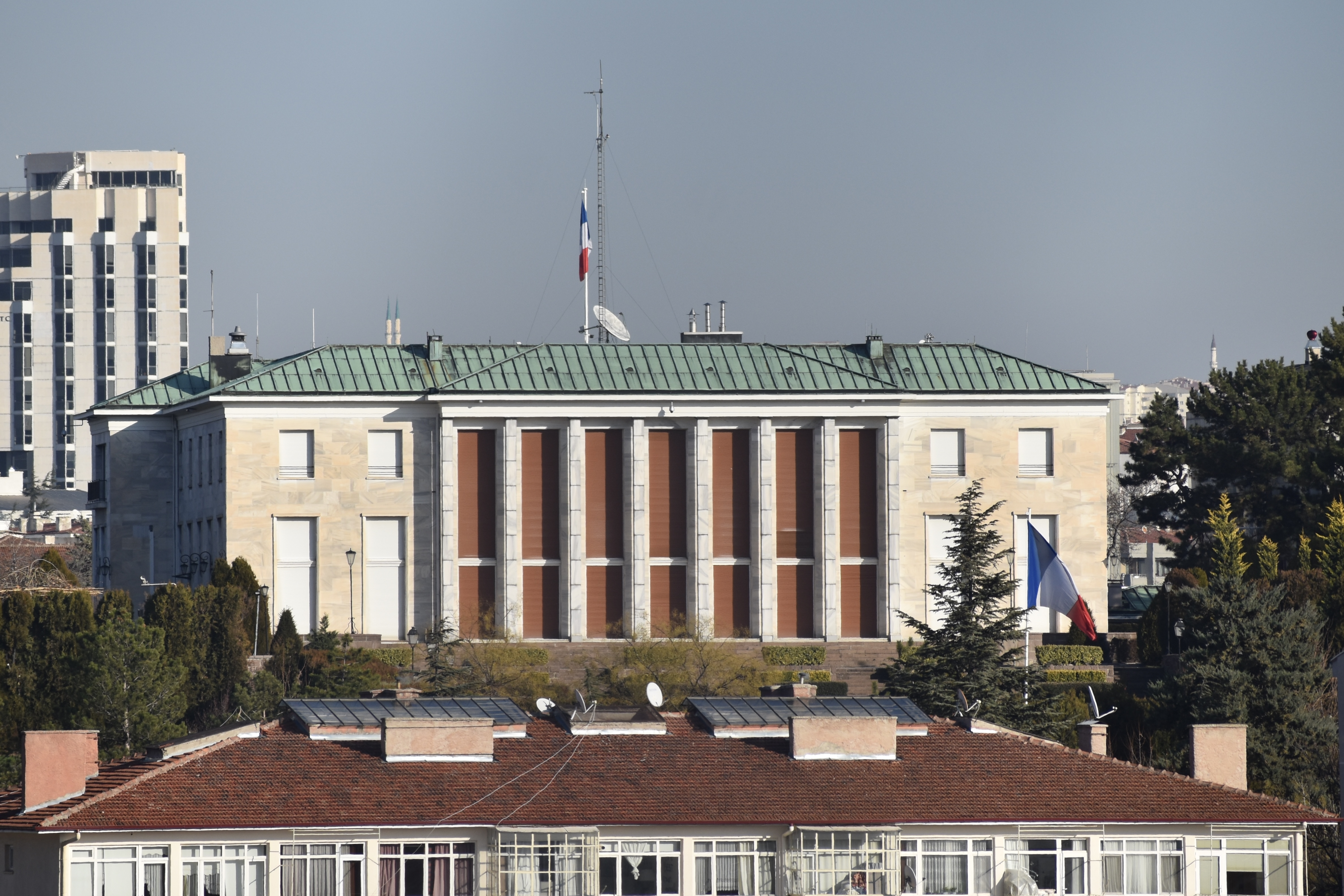
Embassy in Ankara

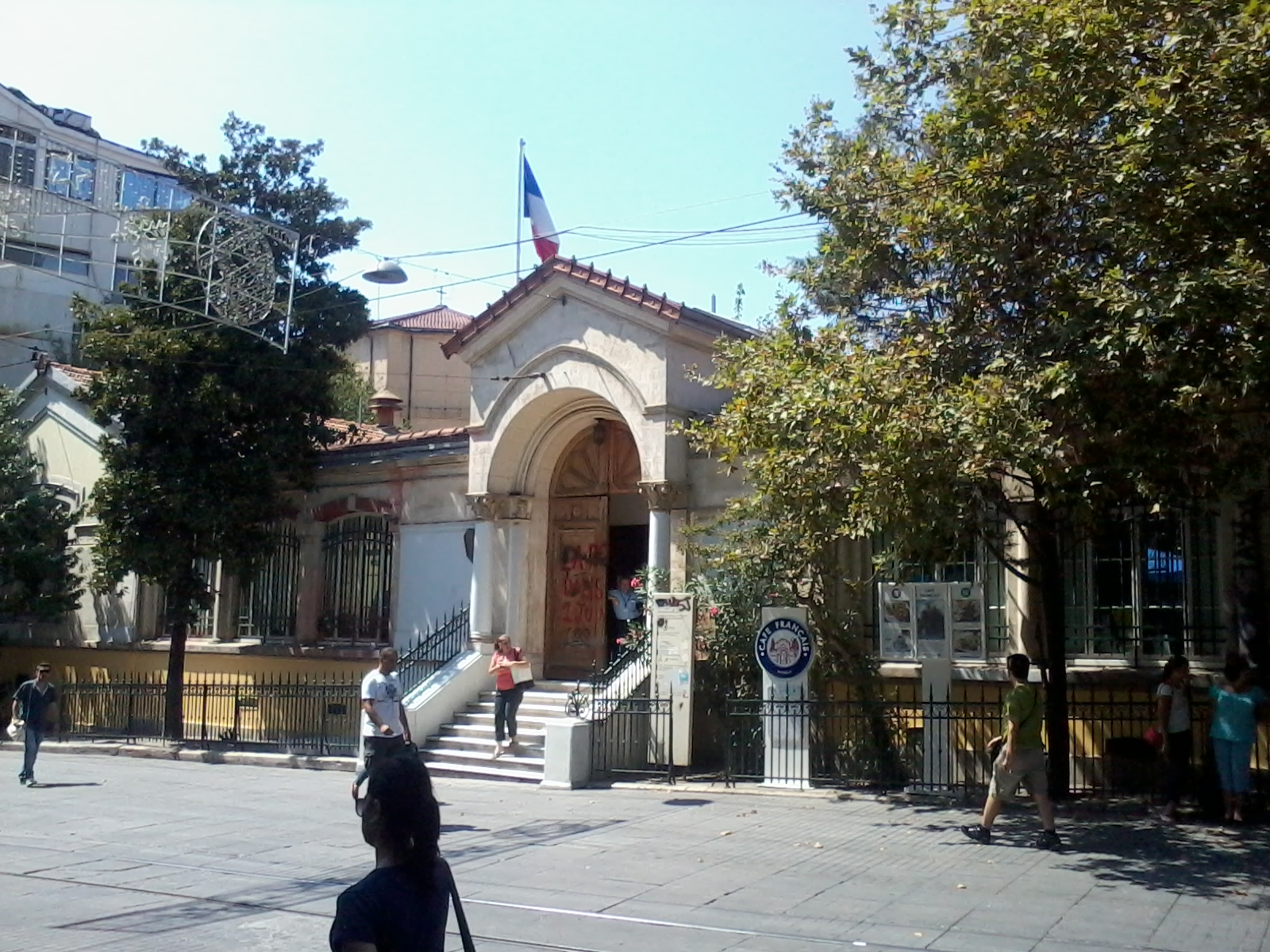
Consulate-General in Istanbul

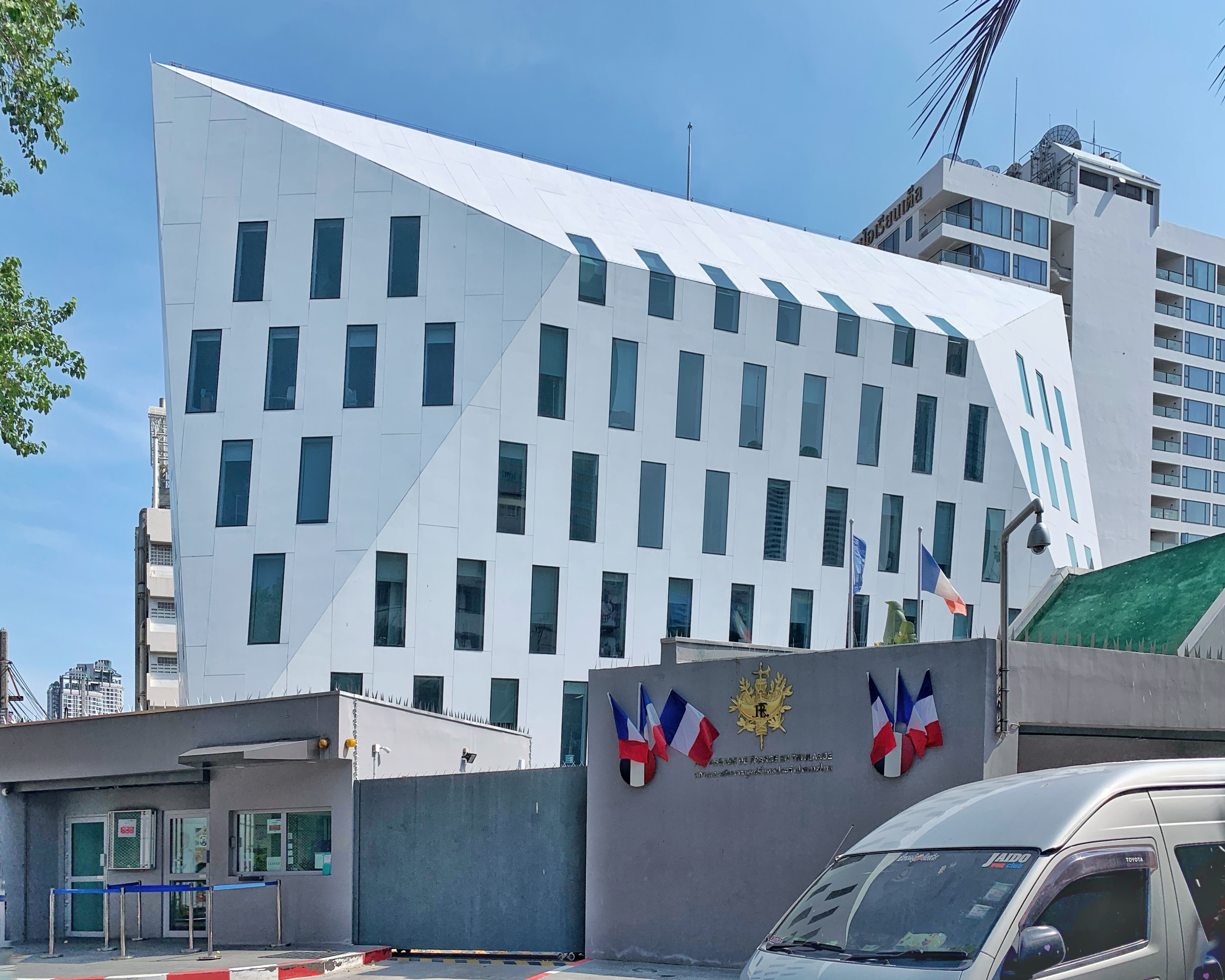
Embassy in Bangkok

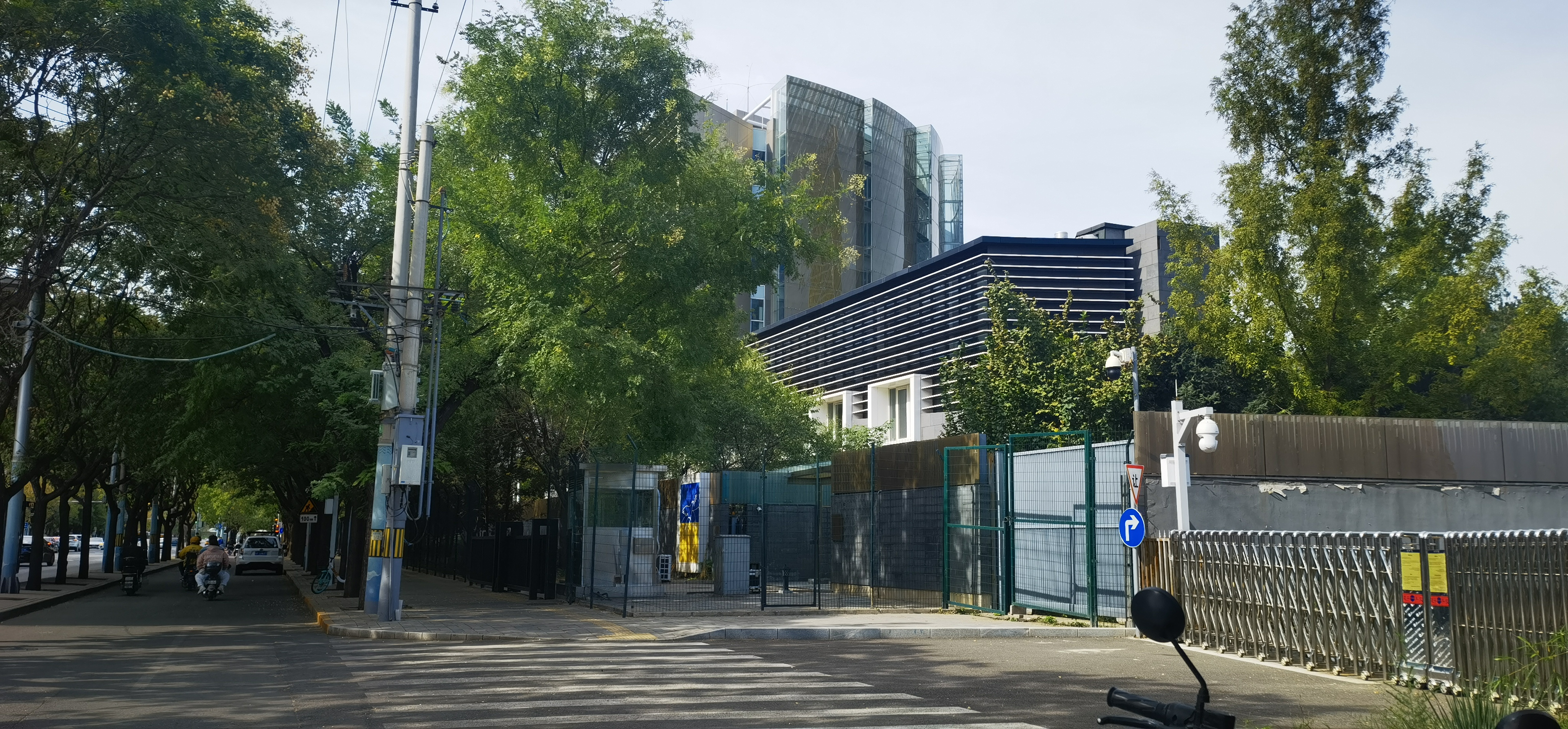
Embassy in Beijing

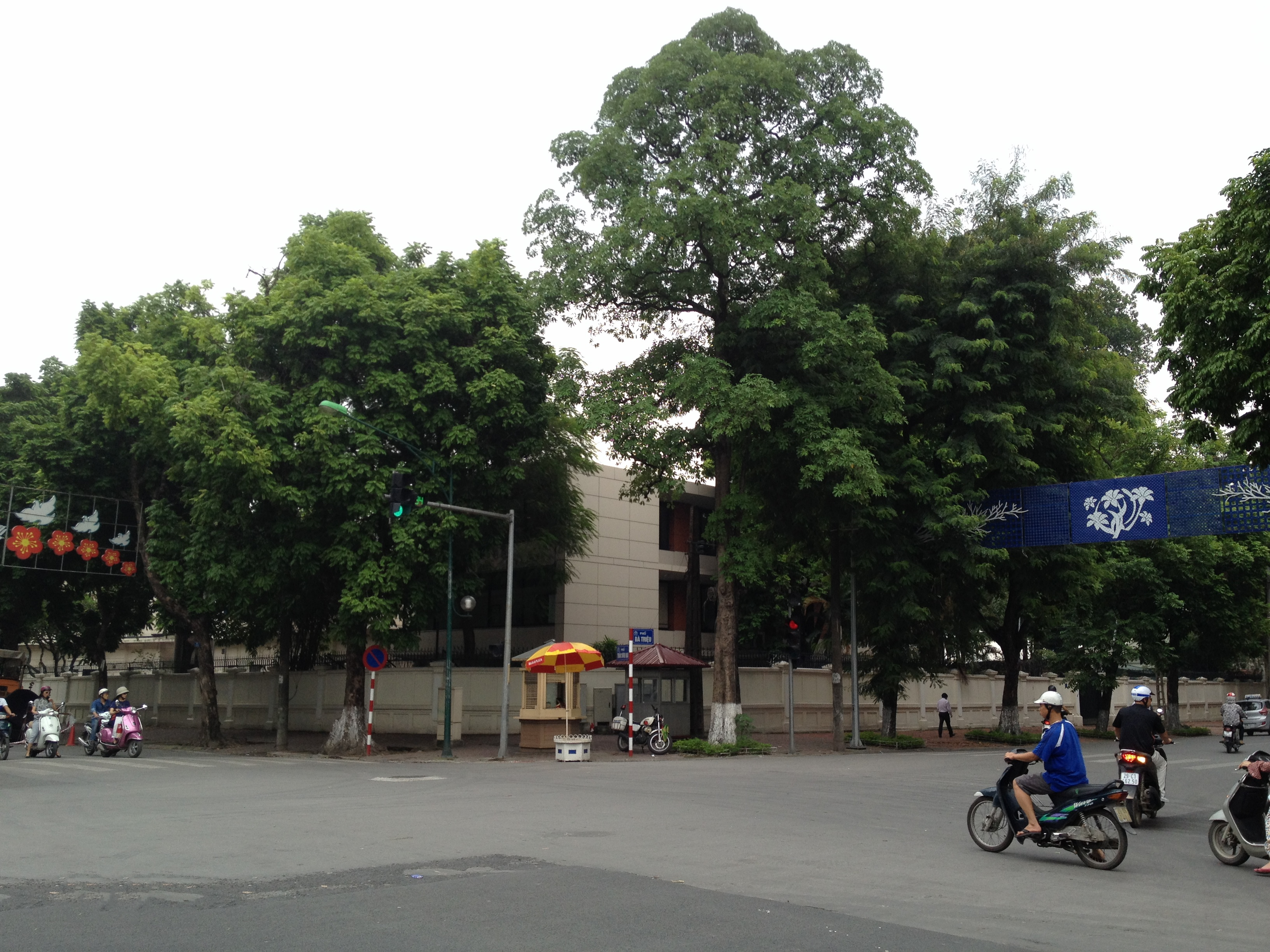
Embassy in Hanoi

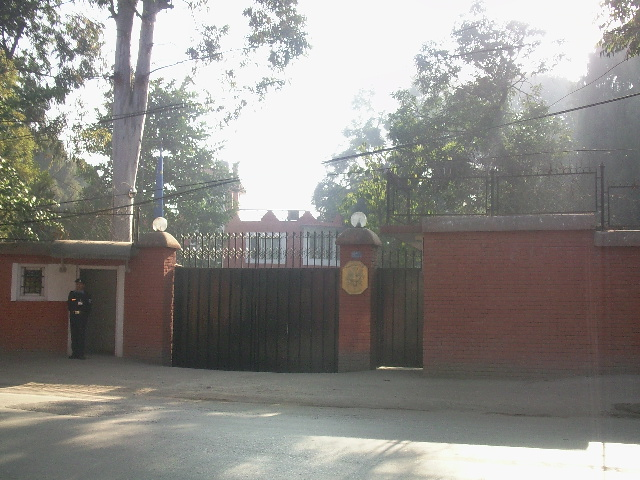
Embassy in Kathmandu

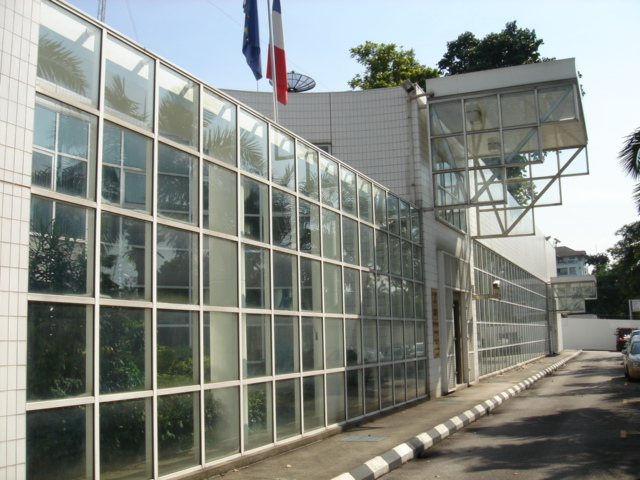
Embassy in Kuala Lumpur

Building hosting the Embassy in Manila

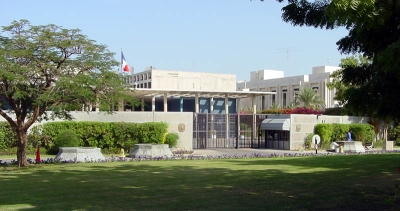
Embassy in Muscat

French Embassy in Seoul

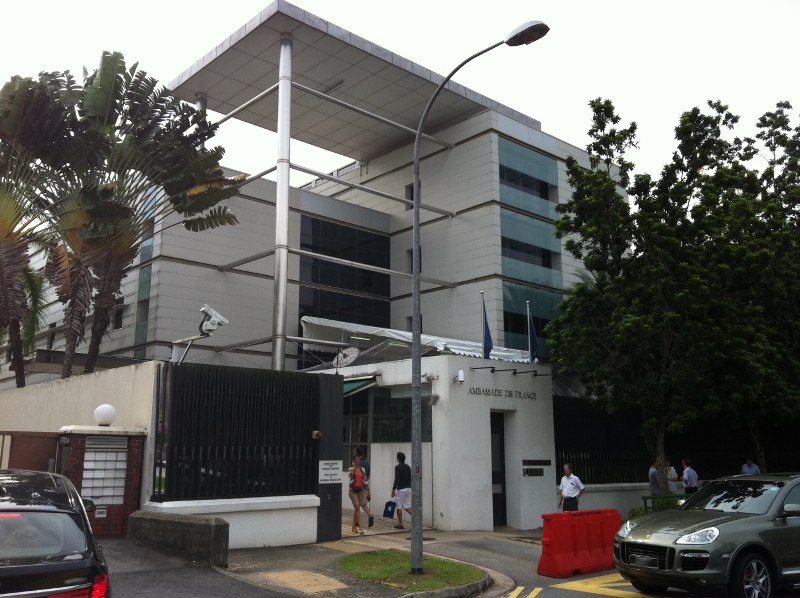
Embassy in Singapore

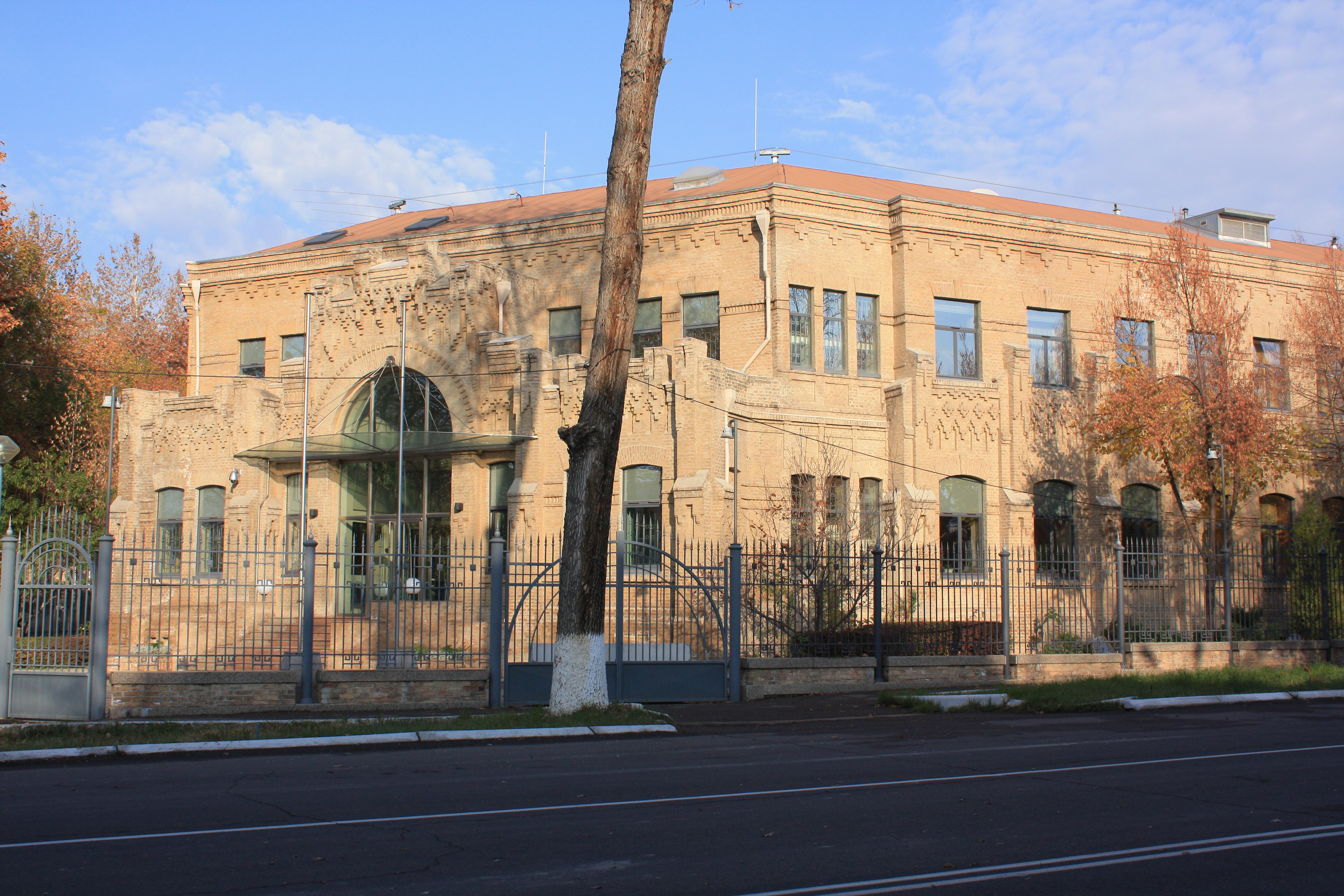
Embassy in Tashkent

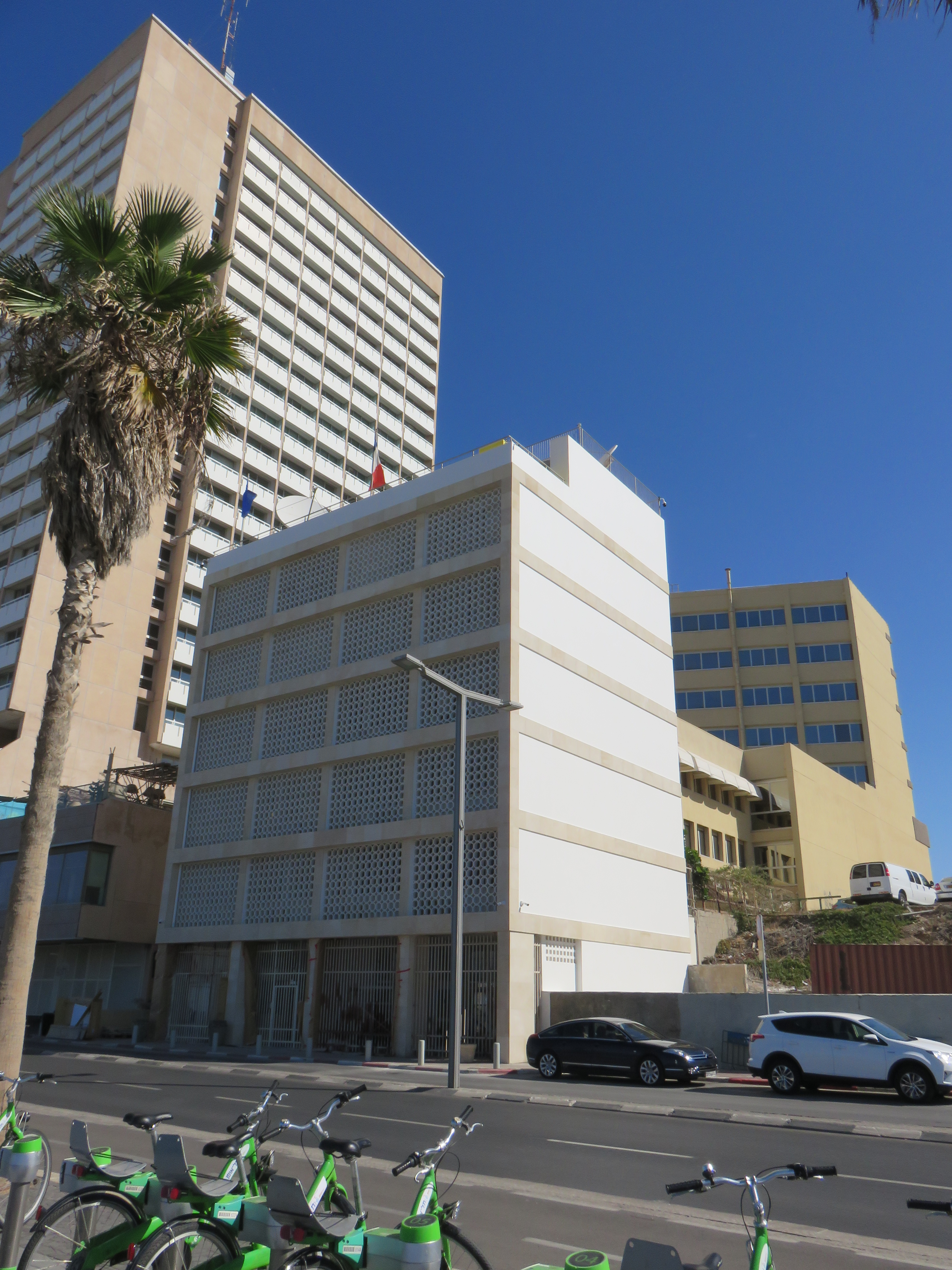
Embassy in Tel-Aviv

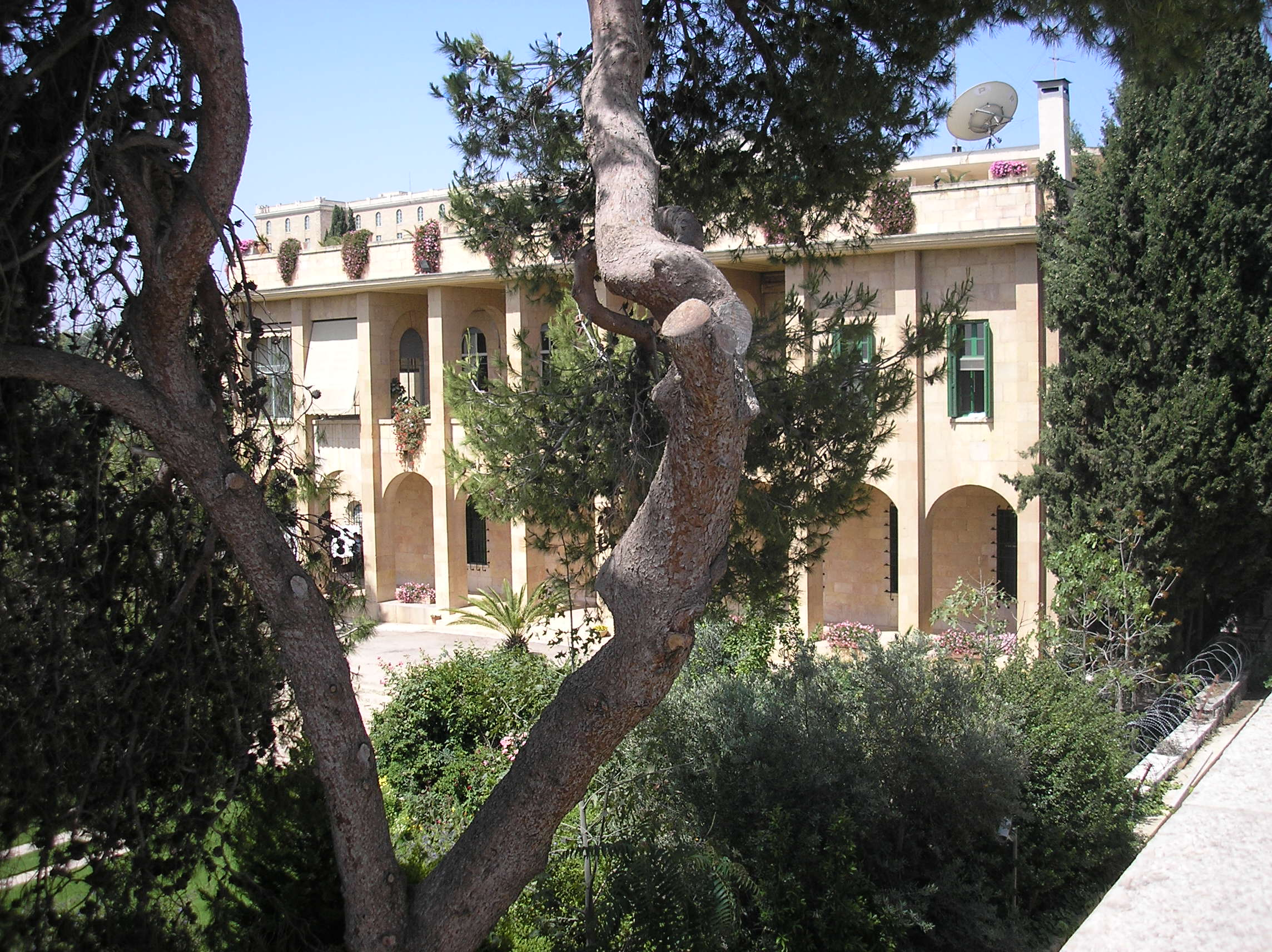
Consulate in Jerusalem

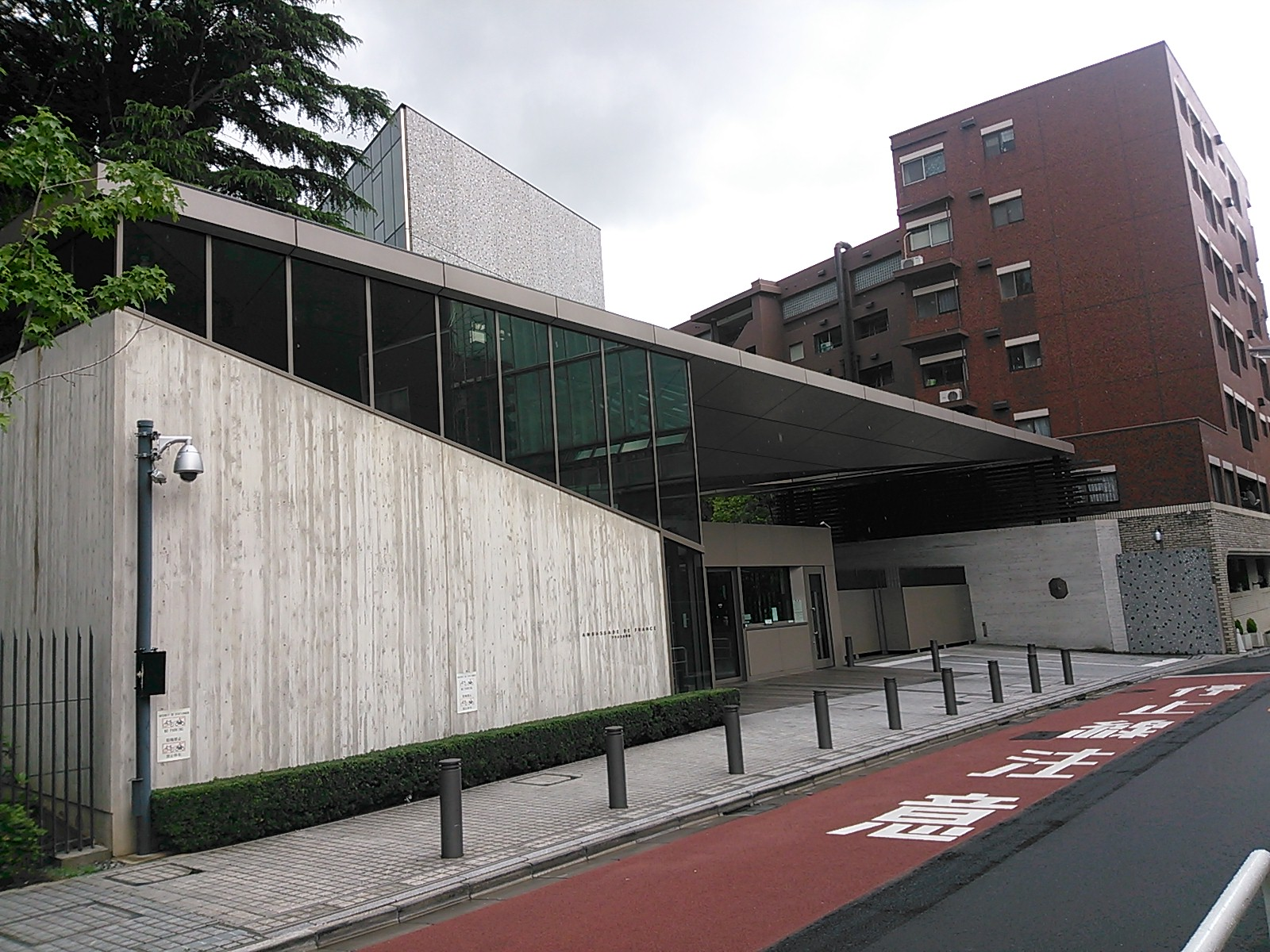
Embassy in Tokyo

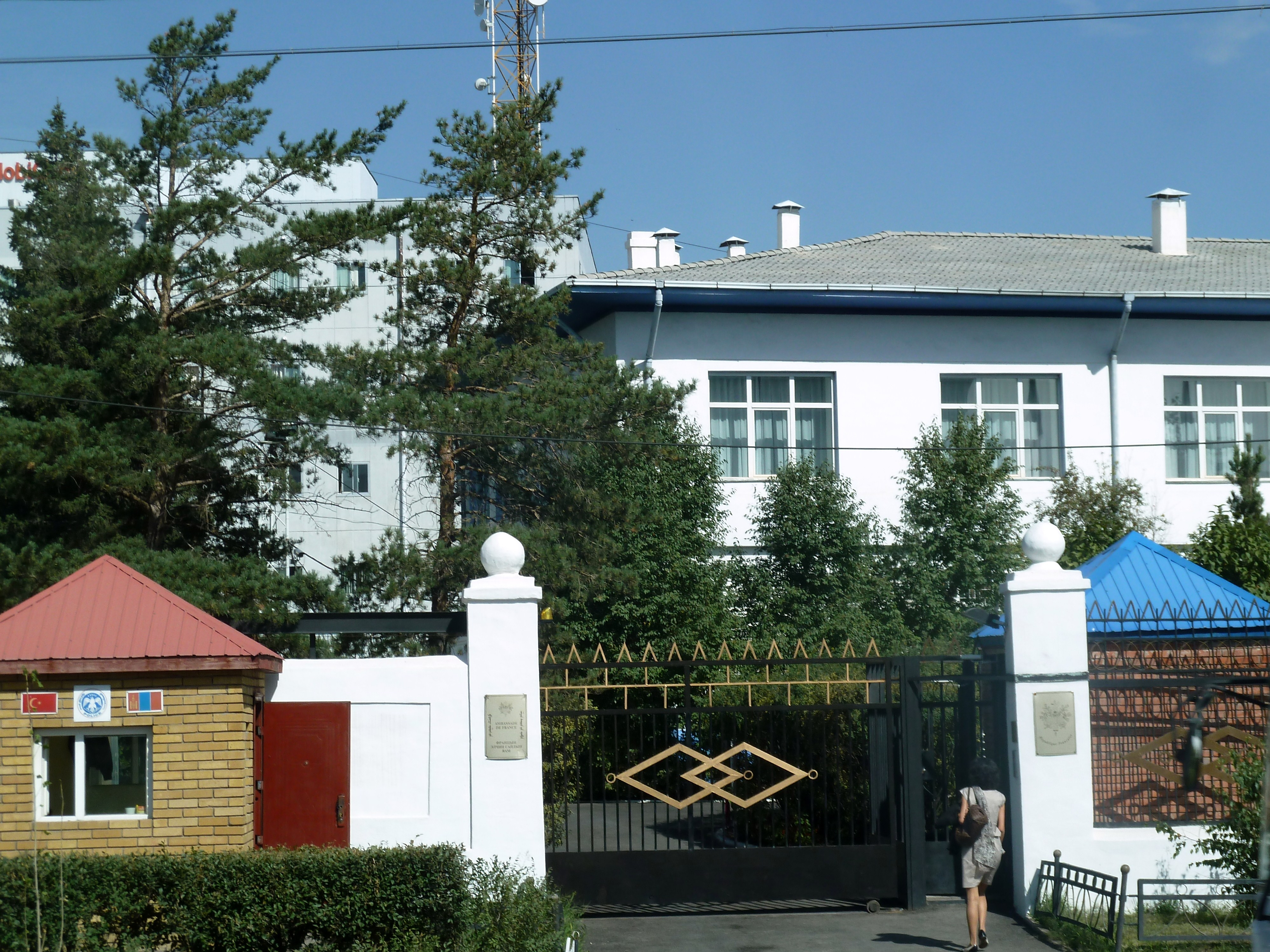
Embassy in Ulaanbaatar

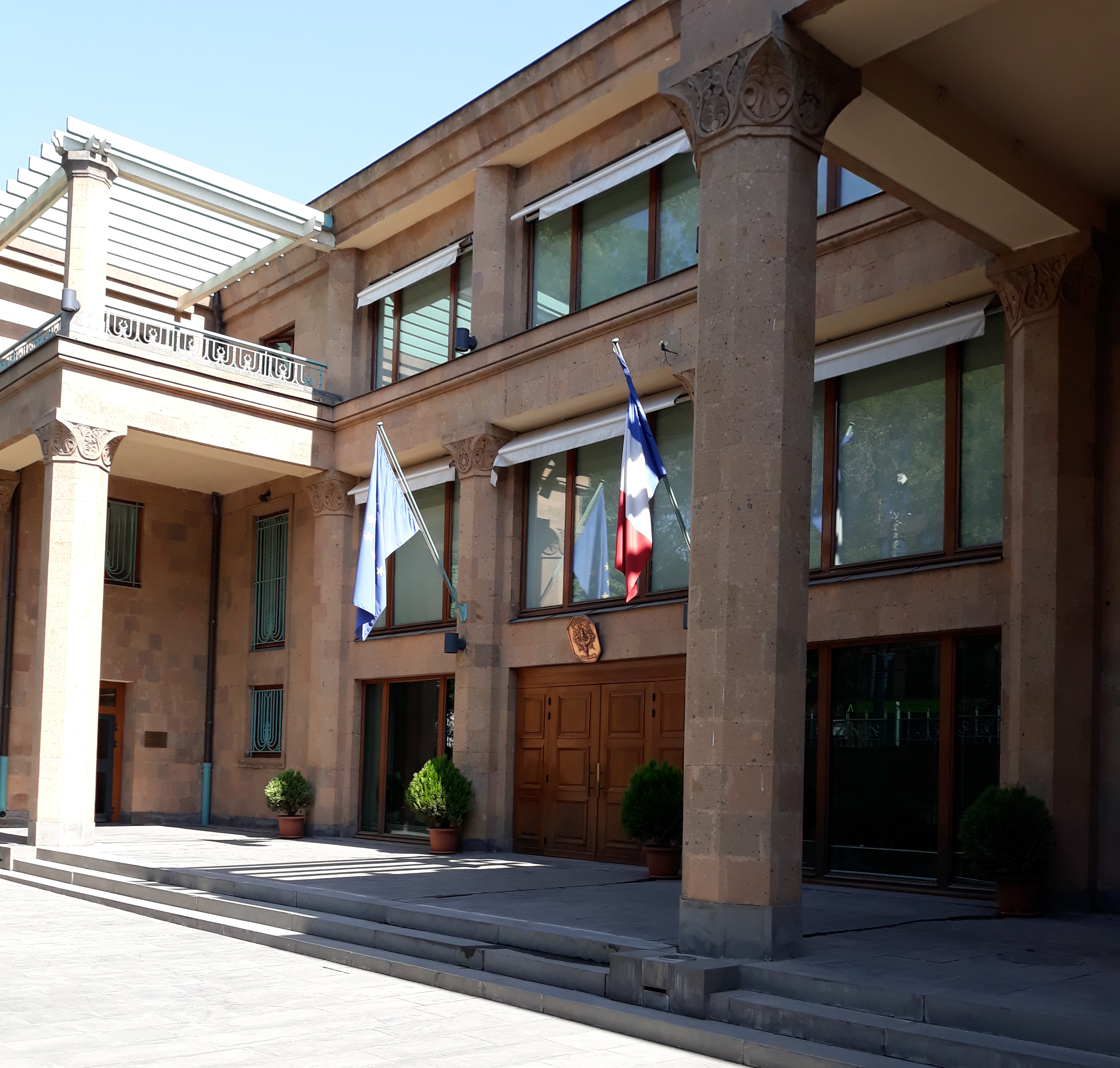
Embassy in Yerevan

=== Europe ===
Host country	Host city	Mission	Concurrent accreditation	Ref.
Albania	Tirana	Embassy		
Andorra	Andorra la Vella	Embassy		
Austria	Vienna	Embassy		
Belarus	Minsk	Embassy		
Belgium	Brussels	Embassy		
Belgium	Brussels	Consulate-General		
Bosnia and Herzegovina	Sarajevo	Embassy		
Bulgaria	Sofia	Embassy		
Croatia	Zagreb	Embassy		
Cyprus	Nicosia	Embassy		
Czech Republic	Prague	Embassy		
Denmark	Copenhagen	Embassy		
Denmark	Nuuk	Consulate-General		
Estonia	Tallinn	Embassy		
Finland	Helsinki	Embassy		
Germany	Berlin	Embassy		
Germany	Düsseldorf	Consulate-General		
Germany	Frankfurt	Consulate-General		
Germany	Hamburg	Consulate-General		
Germany	Munich	Consulate-General		
Germany	Saarbrücken	Consulate-General		
Germany	Stuttgart	Consulate-General		
Greece	Athens	Embassy		
Greece	Athens	Consulate-General		
Greece	Thessaloniki	Consulate-General		
Holy See (Note: The French Embassy to the Holy See is located outside Vatican territory in Rome.)	Rome	Embassy		
Hungary	Budapest	Embassy		
Iceland	Reykjavík	Embassy		
Ireland	Dublin	Embassy		
Italy	Rome	Embassy	Country: San Marino	
Italy	Rome	Consulate-General	Country: San Marino	
Italy	Florence	Consulate-General	Country: San Marino	
Italy	Milan	Consulate-General	Country: San Marino	
Italy	Naples	Consulate-General	Country: San Marino	
Kosovo	Pristina	Embassy		
Latvia	Riga	Embassy		
Lithuania	Vilnius	Embassy		
Luxembourg	Luxembourg City	Embassy		
Malta	Valletta	Embassy		
Moldova	Chișinău	Embassy		
Monaco	La Rousse	Embassy		
Montenegro	Podgorica	Embassy		
Netherlands	The Hague	Embassy		
Netherlands	Amsterdam	Consulate-General		
North Macedonia	Skopje	Embassy		
Norway	Oslo	Embassy		
Poland	Warsaw	Embassy		
Poland	Kraków	Consulate-General		
Portugal	Lisbon	Embassy		
Romania	Bucharest	Embassy		
Russia	Moscow	Embassy		
Russia	Saint Petersburg	Consulate-General		
Russia	Yekaterinburg	Consulate-General		
Serbia	Belgrade	Embassy		
Slovakia	Bratislava	Embassy		
Slovenia	Ljubljana	Embassy		
Spain	Madrid	Embassy		
Spain	Madrid	Consulate-General		
Spain	Barcelona	Consulate-General		
Spain	Bilbao	Consulate-General		
Spain	Seville	Consulate-General		
Sweden	Stockholm	Embassy		
Switzerland	Bern	Embassy	Country: Liechtenstein	
Switzerland	Geneva	Consulate-General	Country: Liechtenstein	
Switzerland	Zurich	Consulate-General	Country: Liechtenstein	
Ukraine	Kyiv	Embassy		
United Kingdom	London	Embassy		
United Kingdom	London	Consulate-General		
United Kingdom	Edinburgh	Consulate-General		

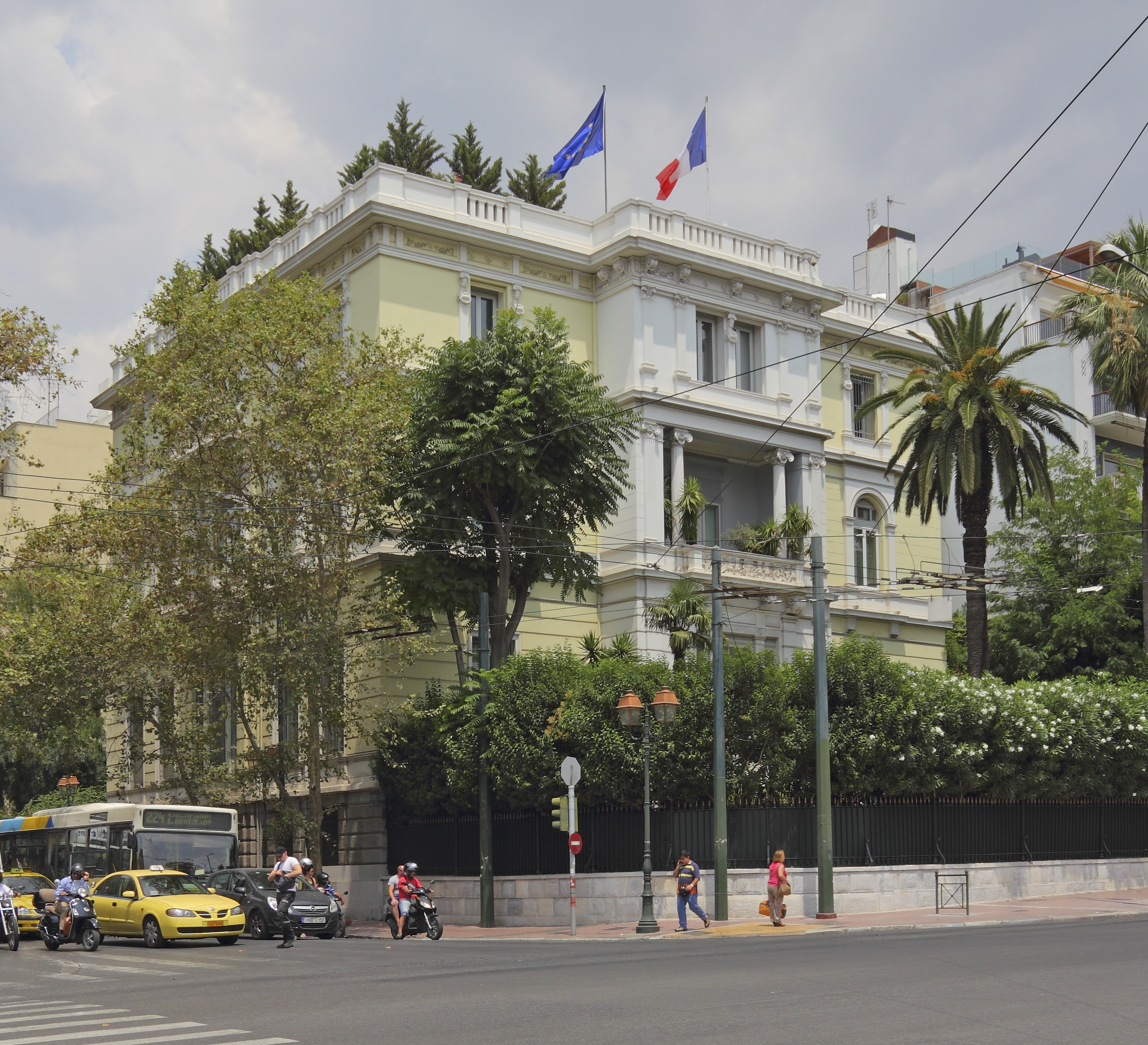
Embassy in Athens

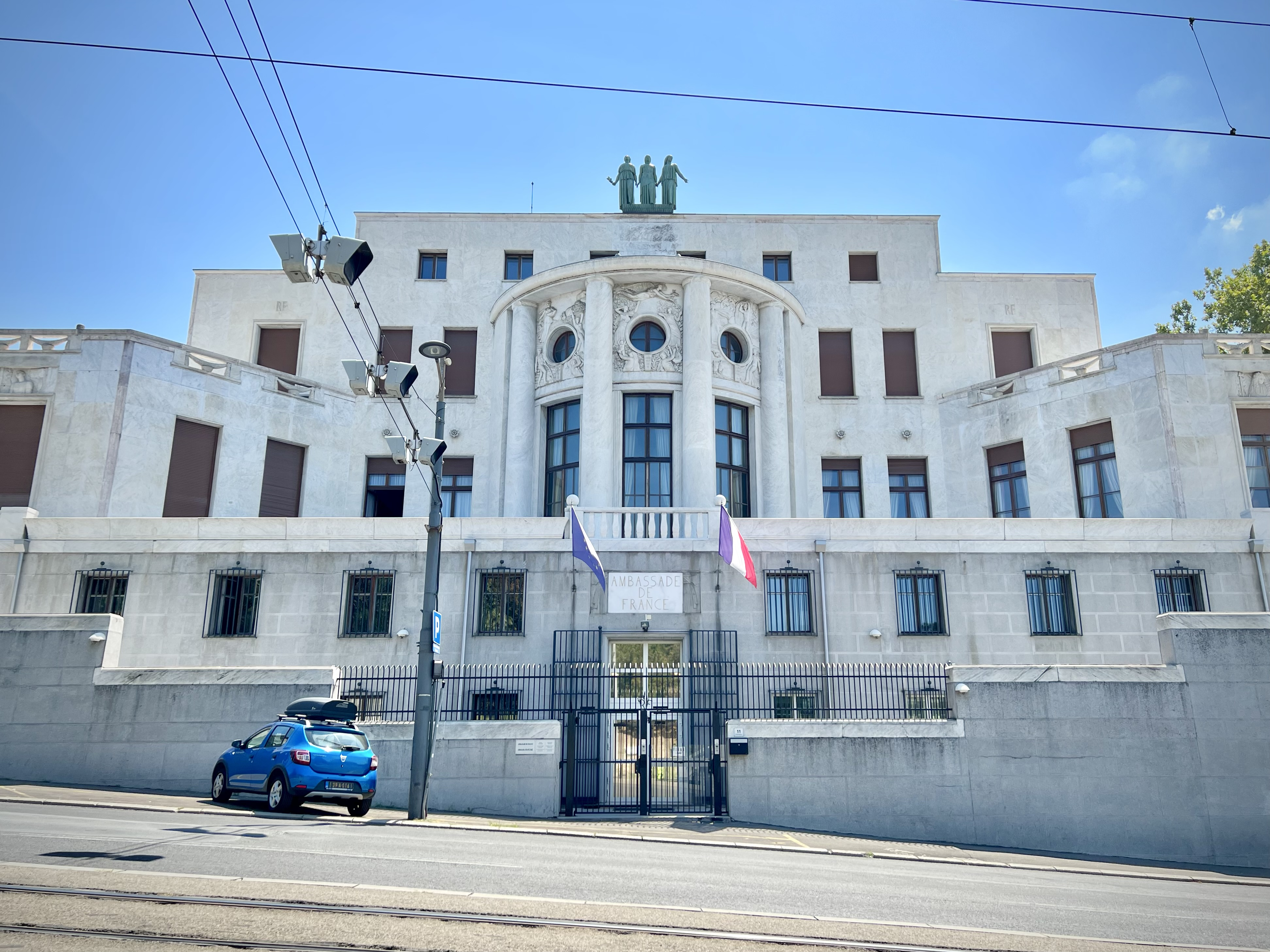
Embassy in Belgrade

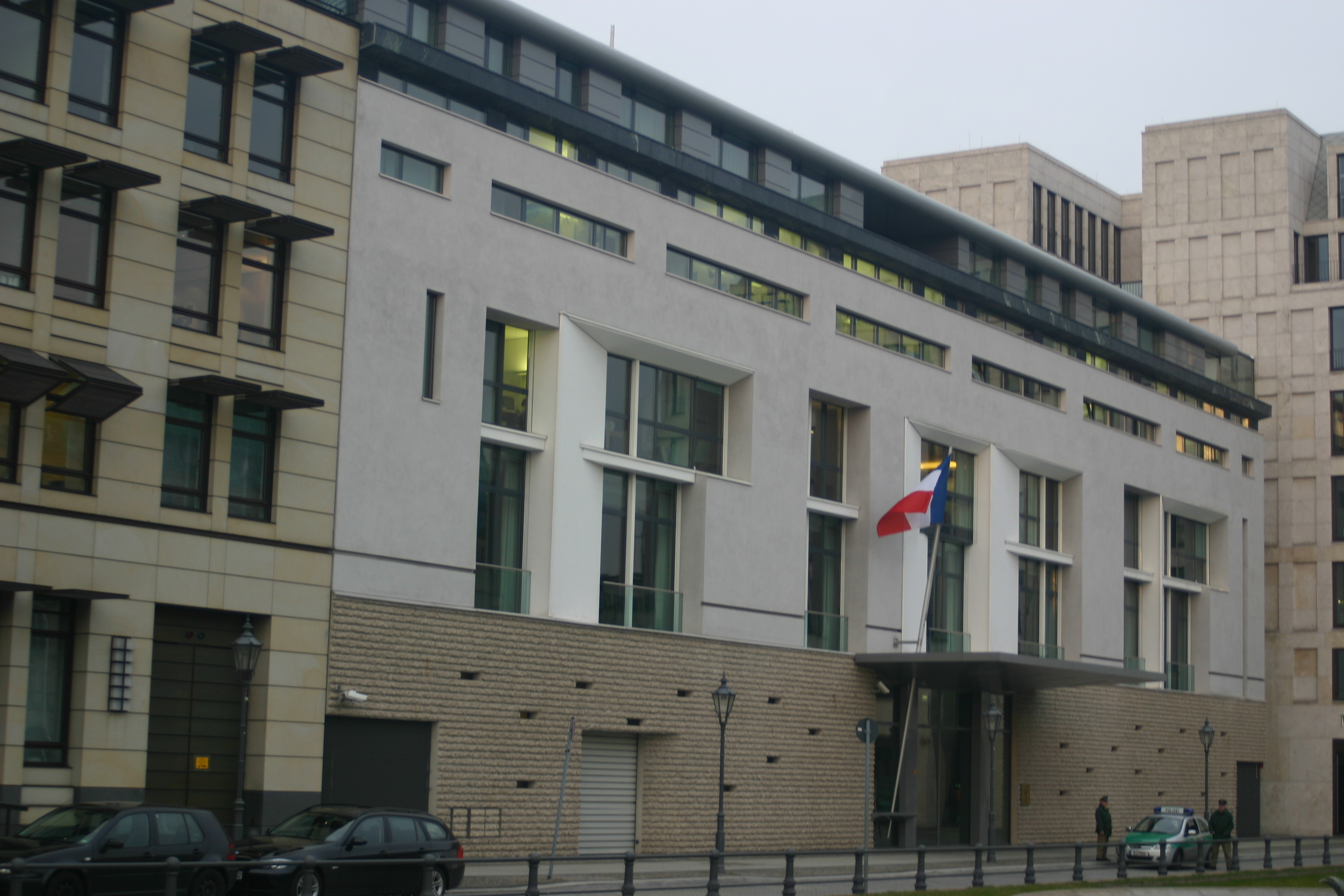
Embassy in Berlin

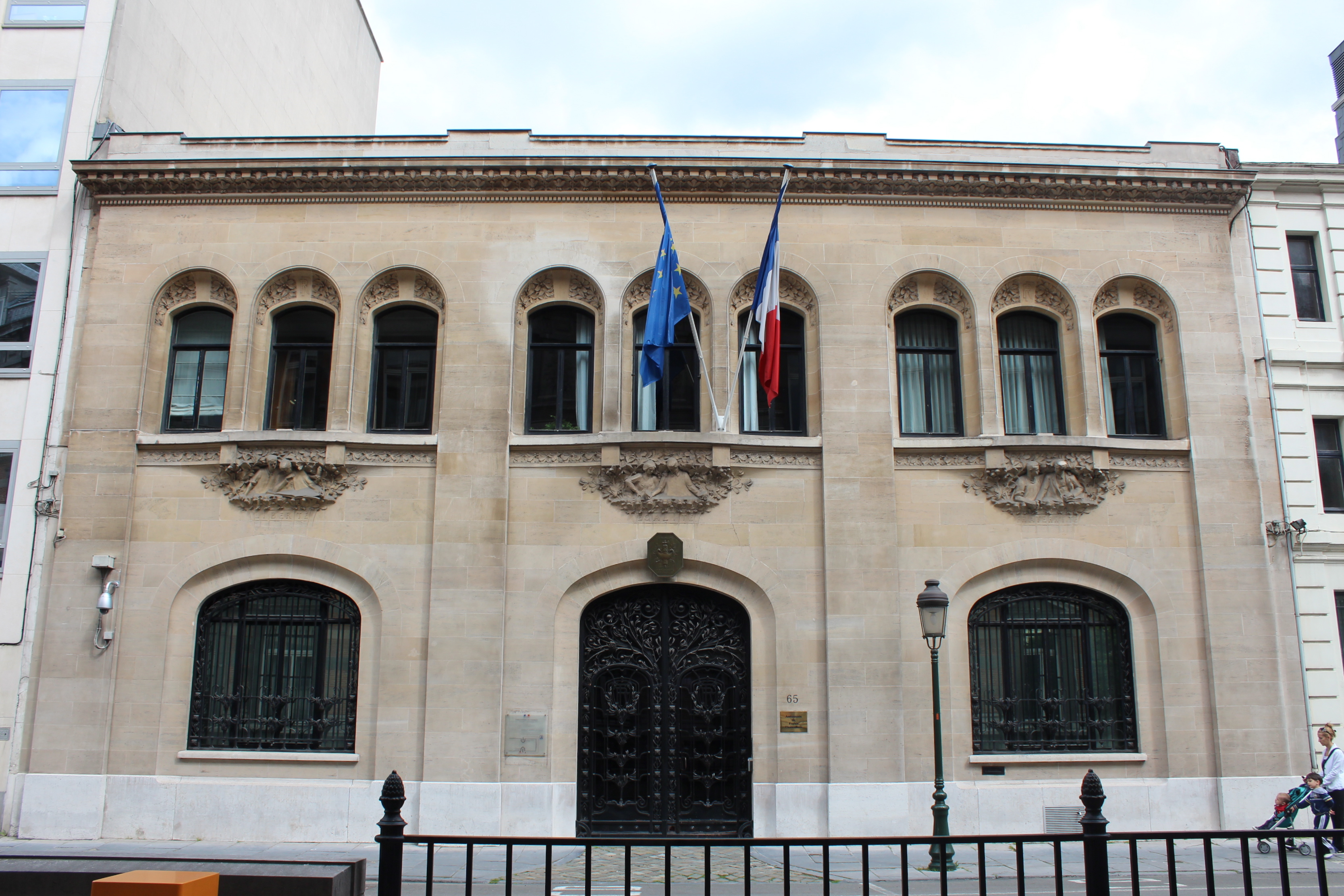
Embassy in Brussels

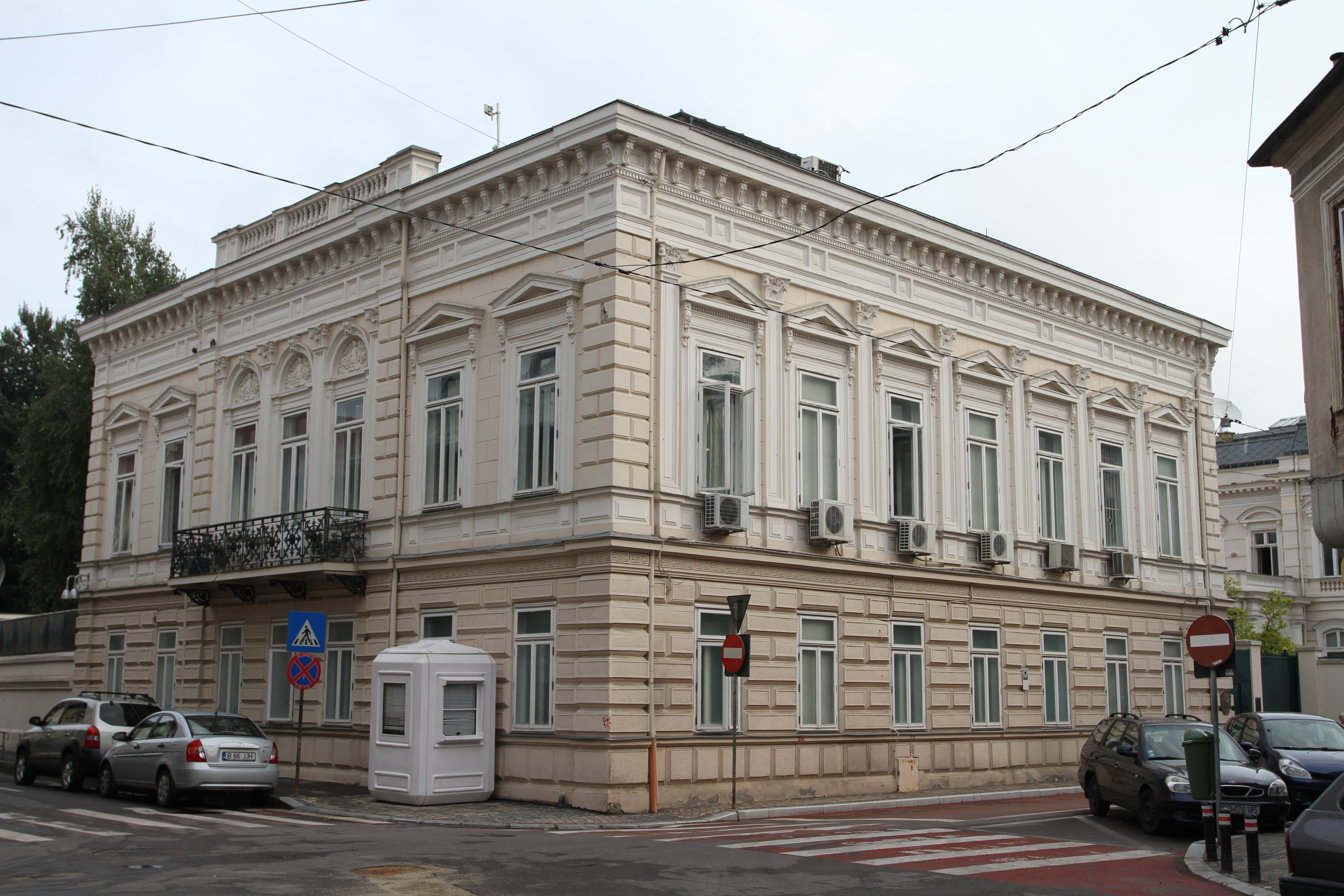
Embassy in Bucharest

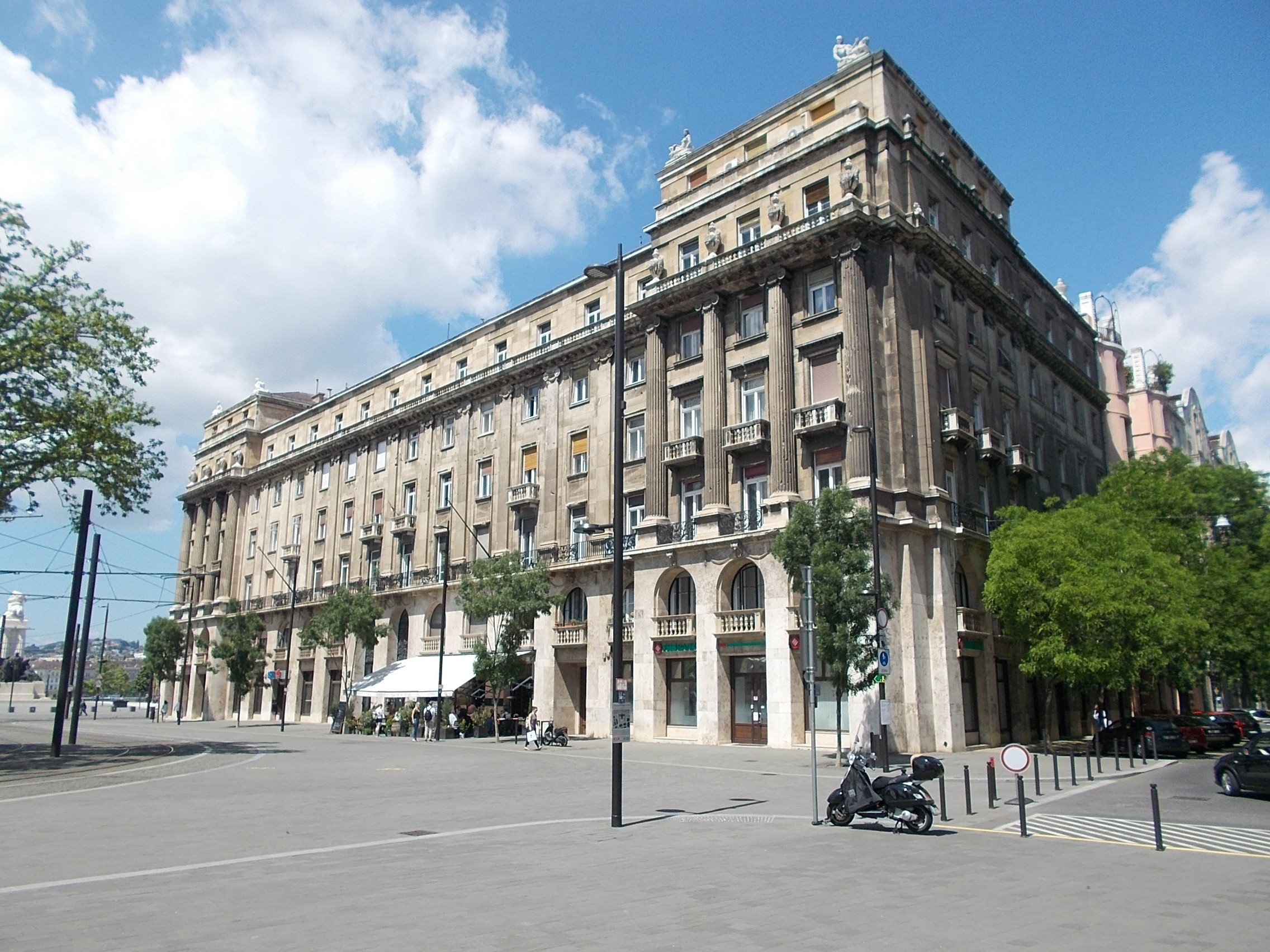
Embassy in Budapest

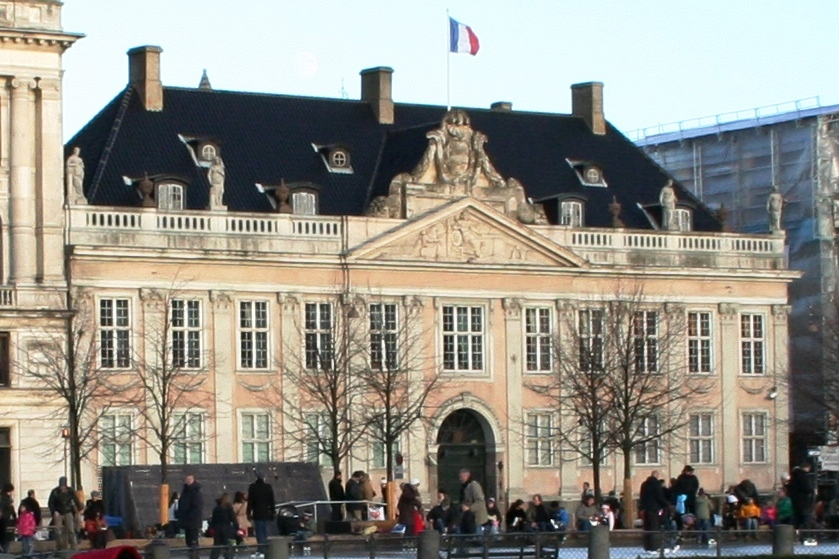
Embassy in Copenhagen

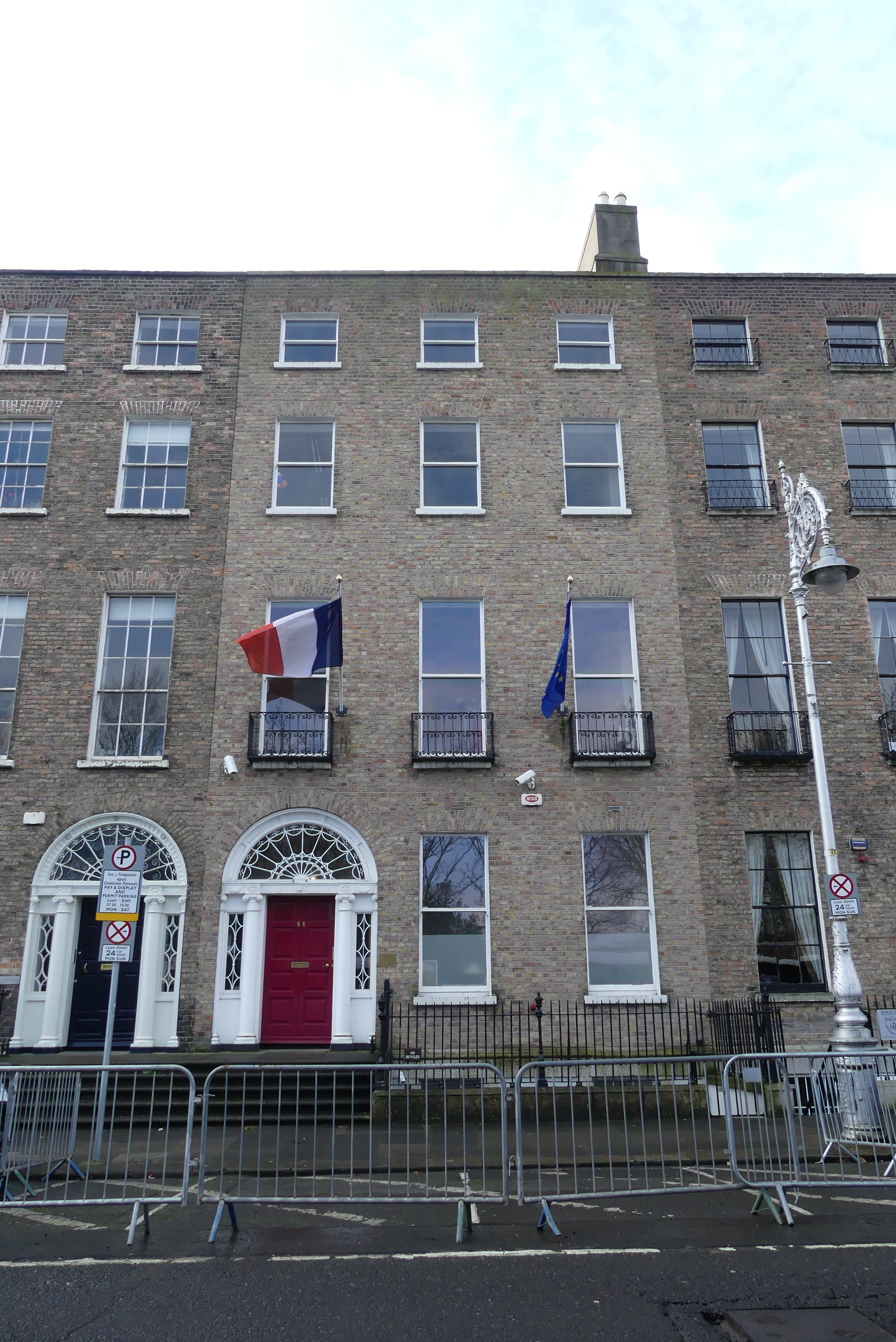
Embassy in Dublin

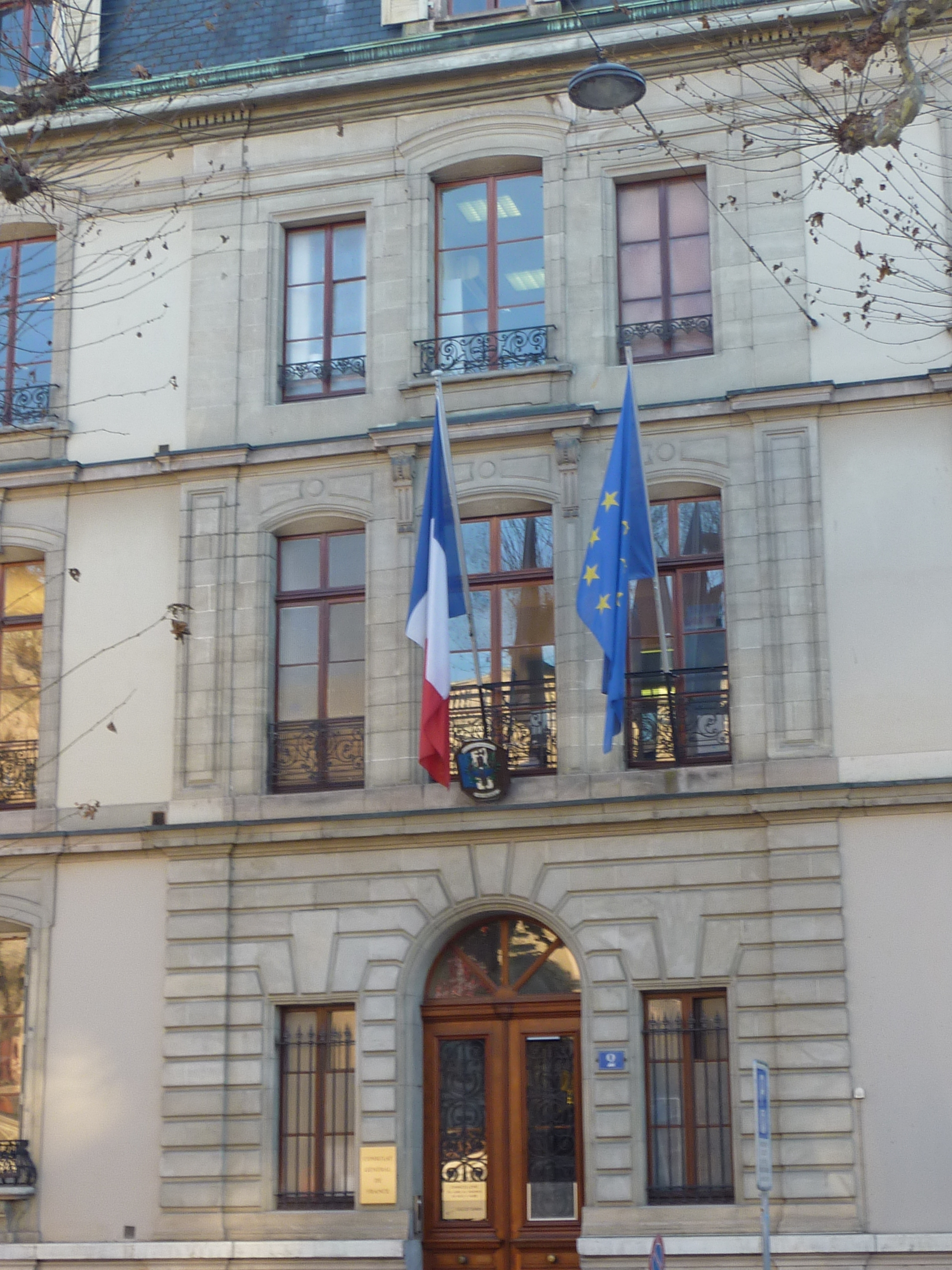
Consulate-General in Geneva

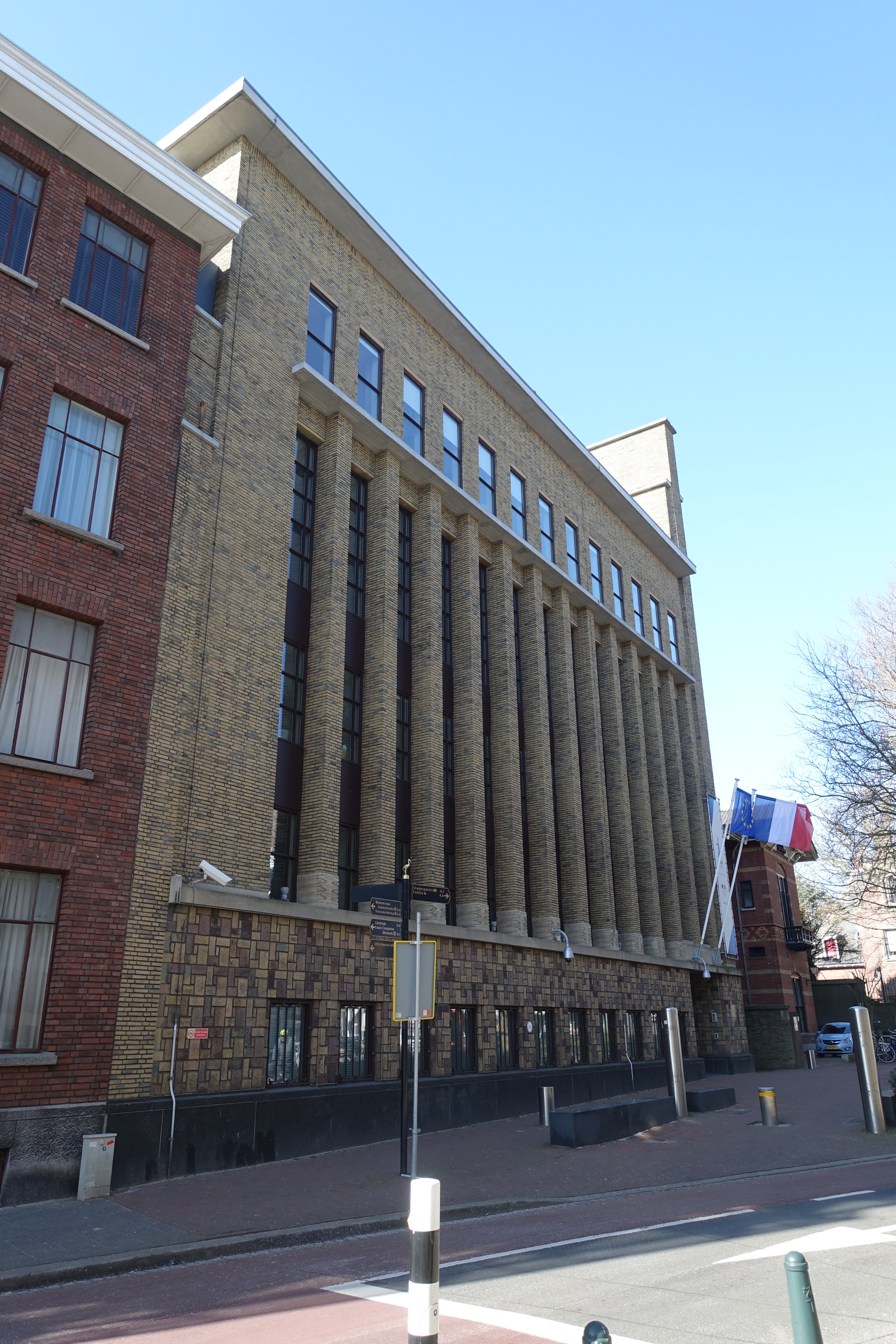
Embassy in The Hague

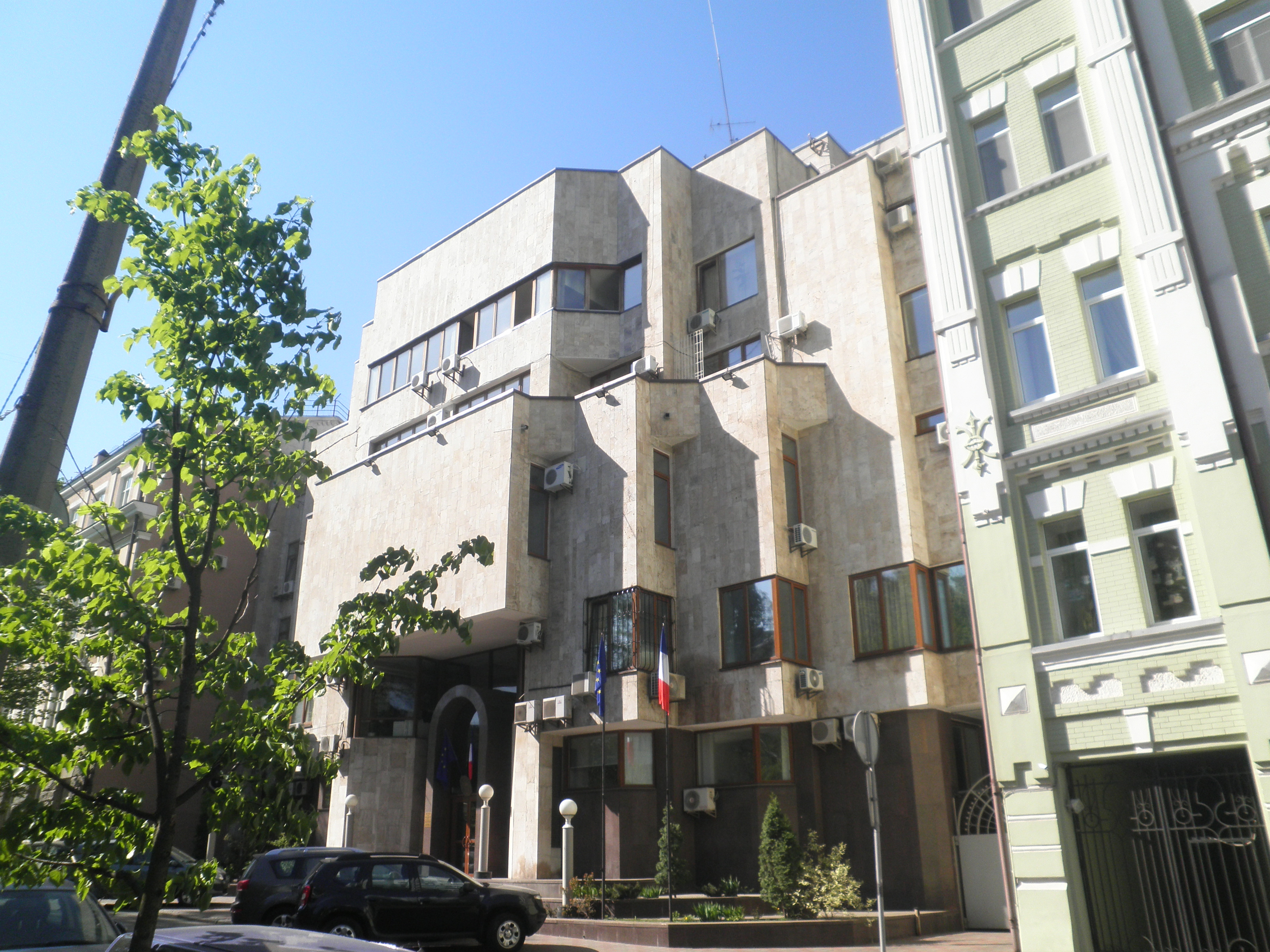
Embassy in Kyiv

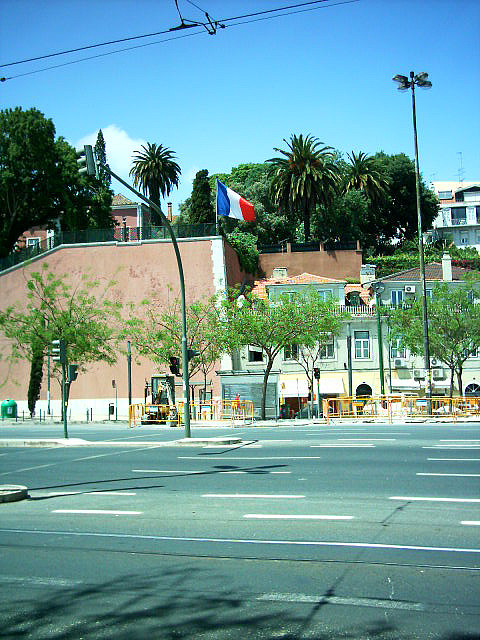
Embassy in Lisbon

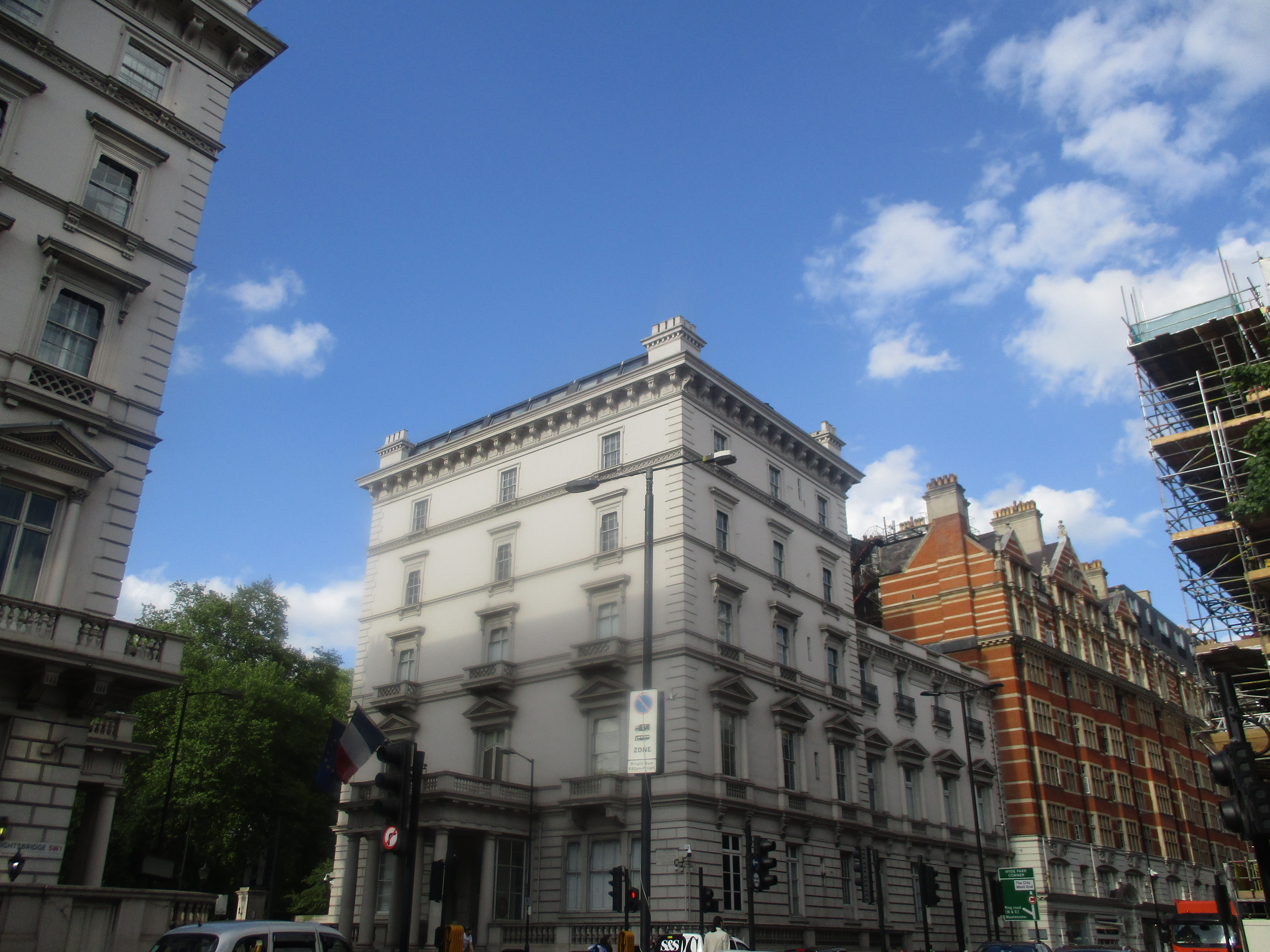
Embassy in London

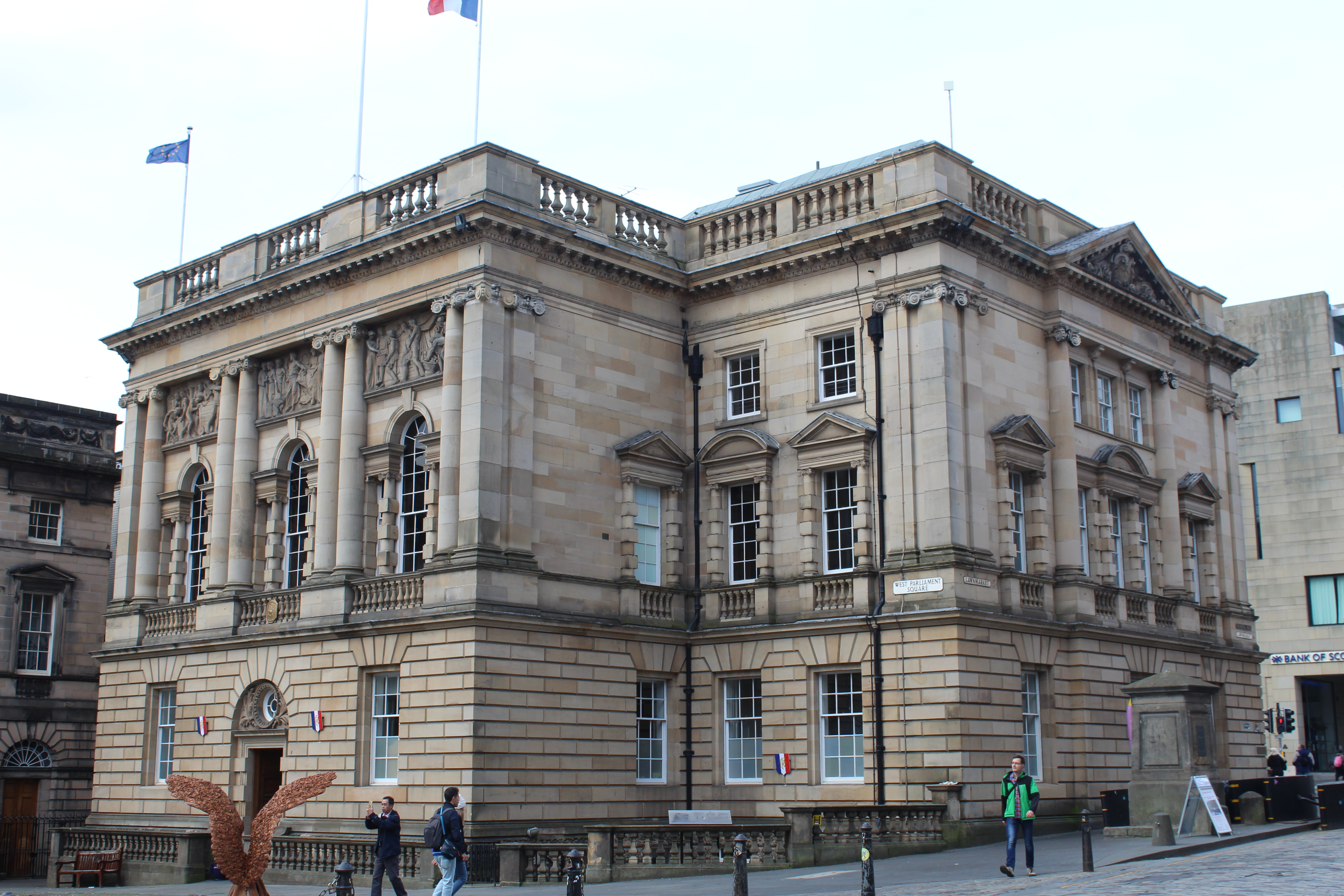
Consulate-General in Edinburgh

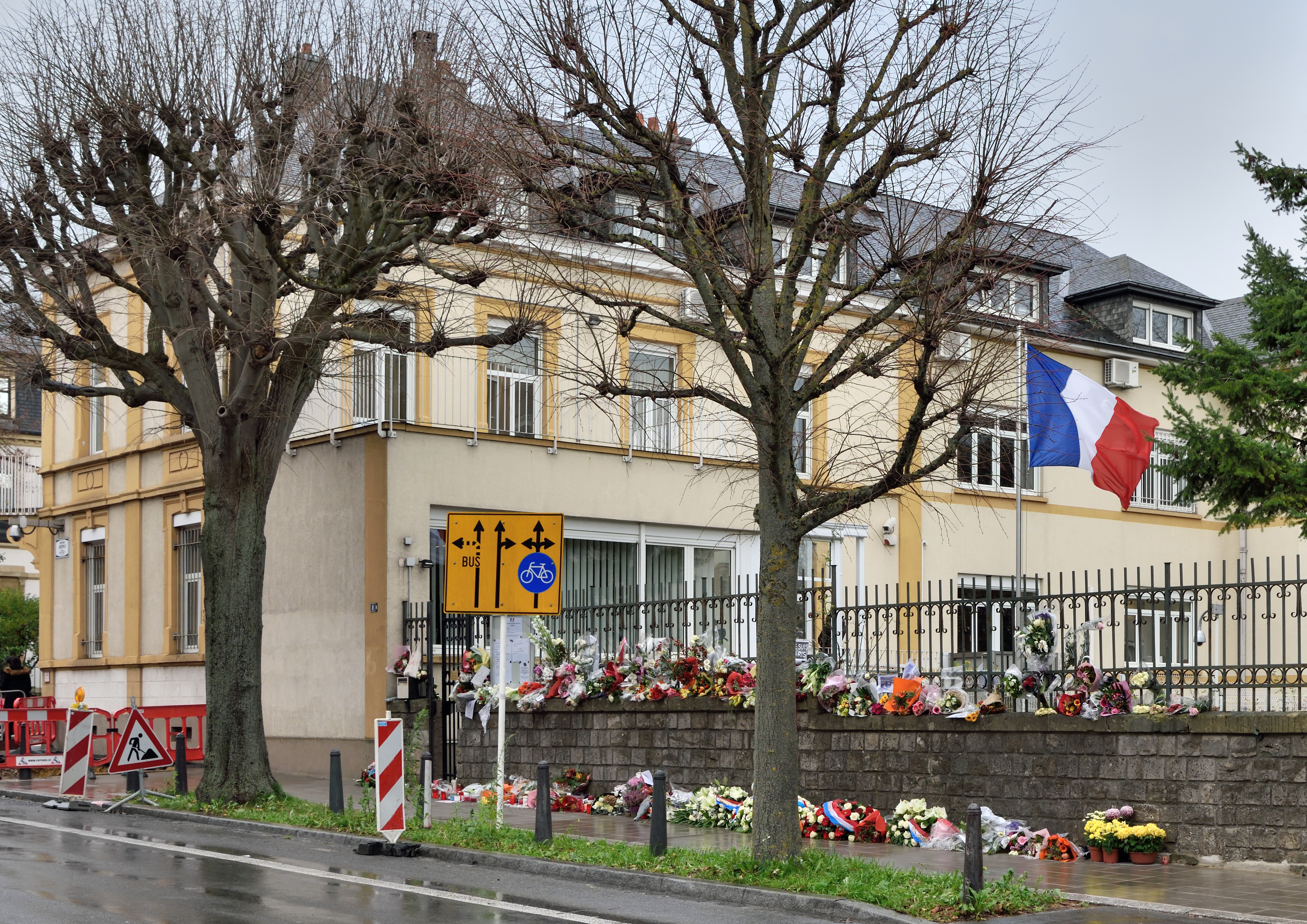
Embassy in Luxembourg

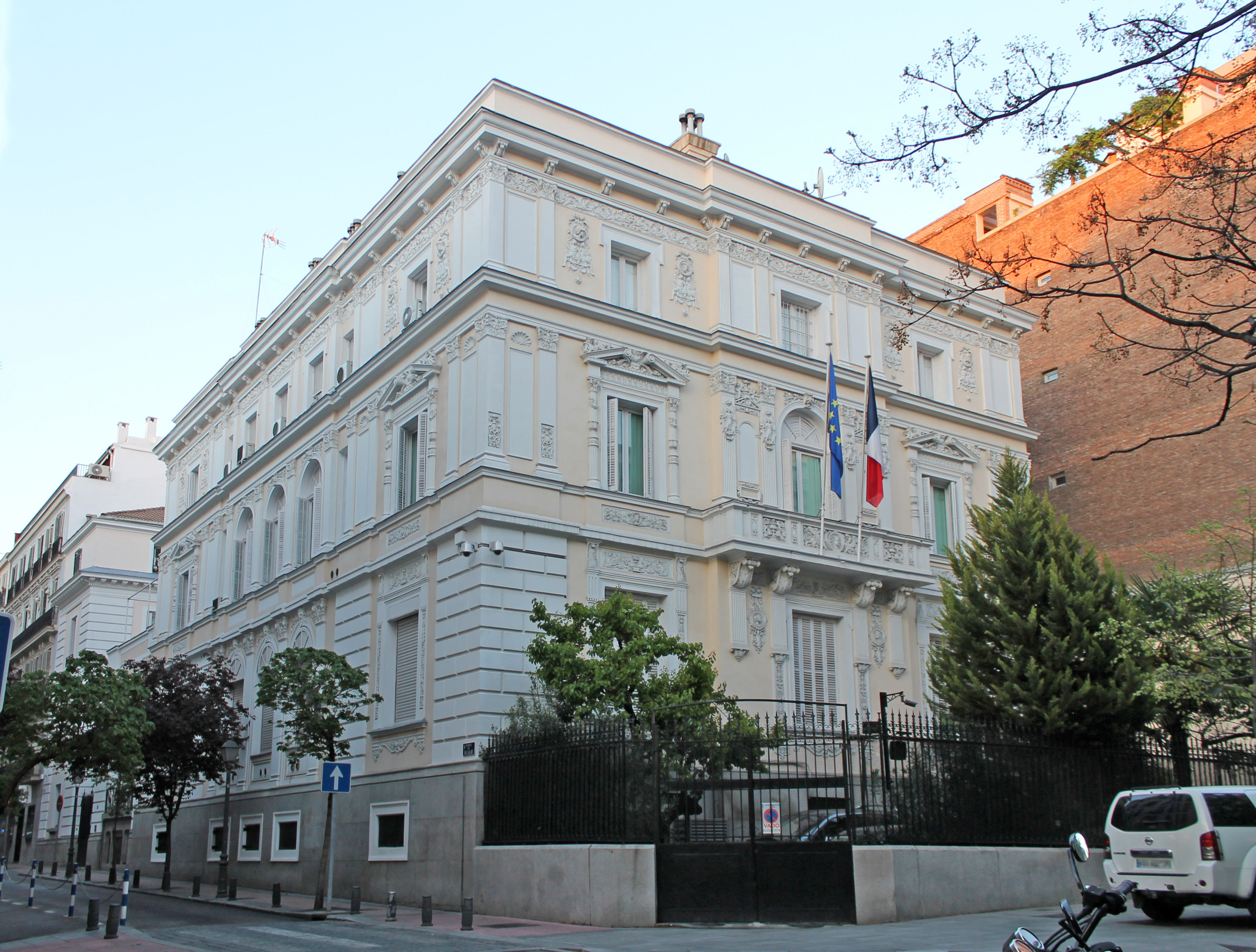
Embassy in Madrid

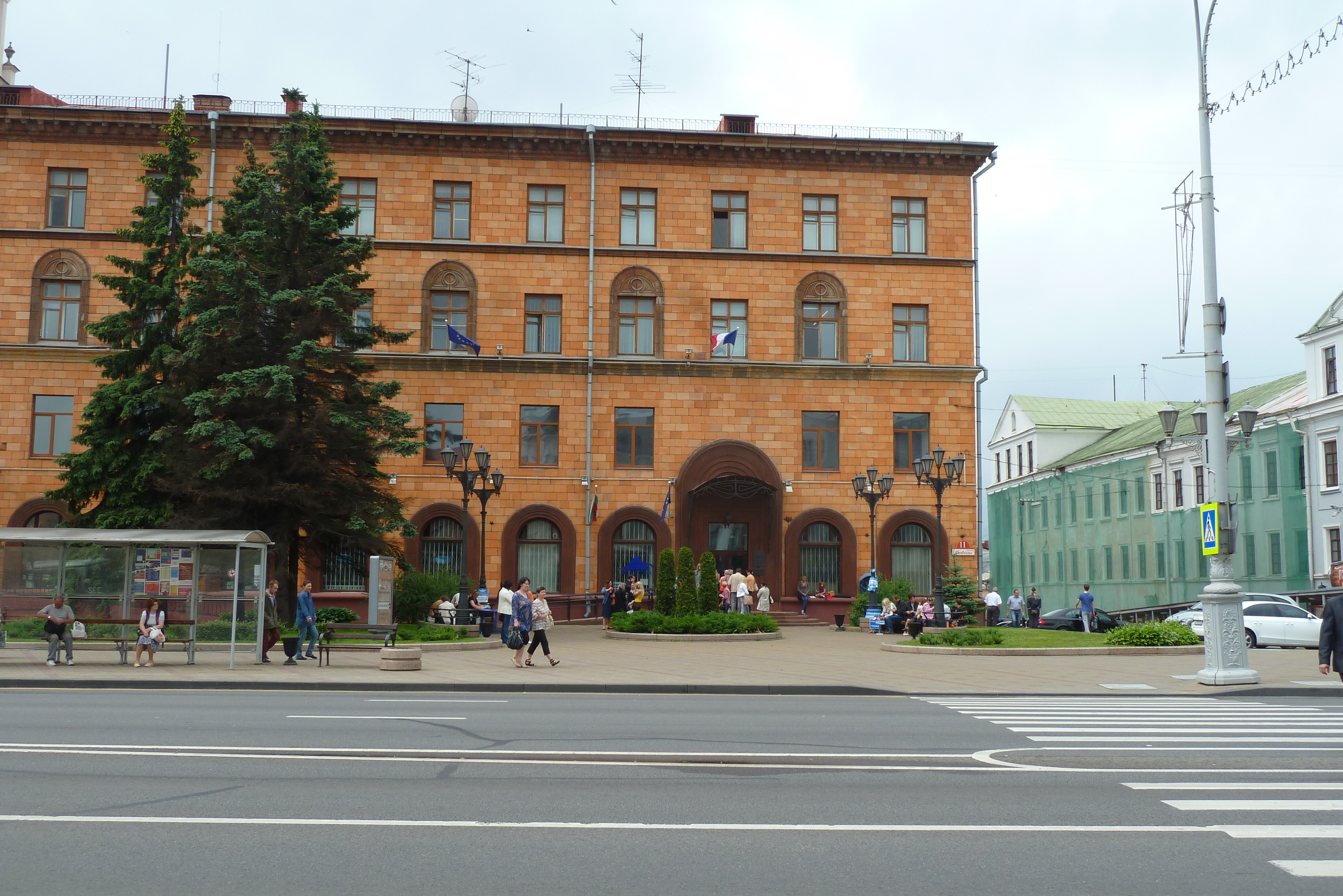
Embassy in Minsk

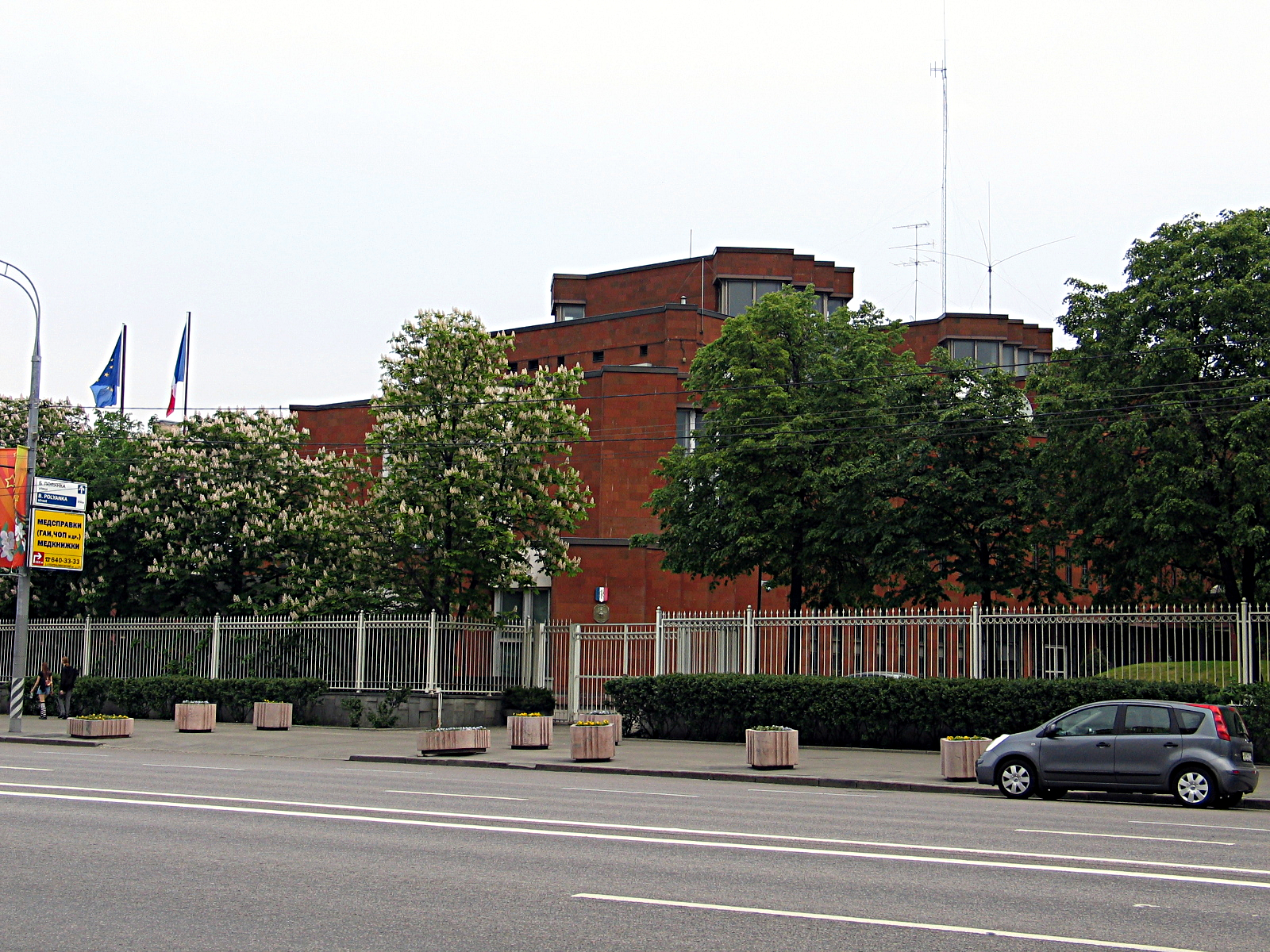
Embassy in Moscow

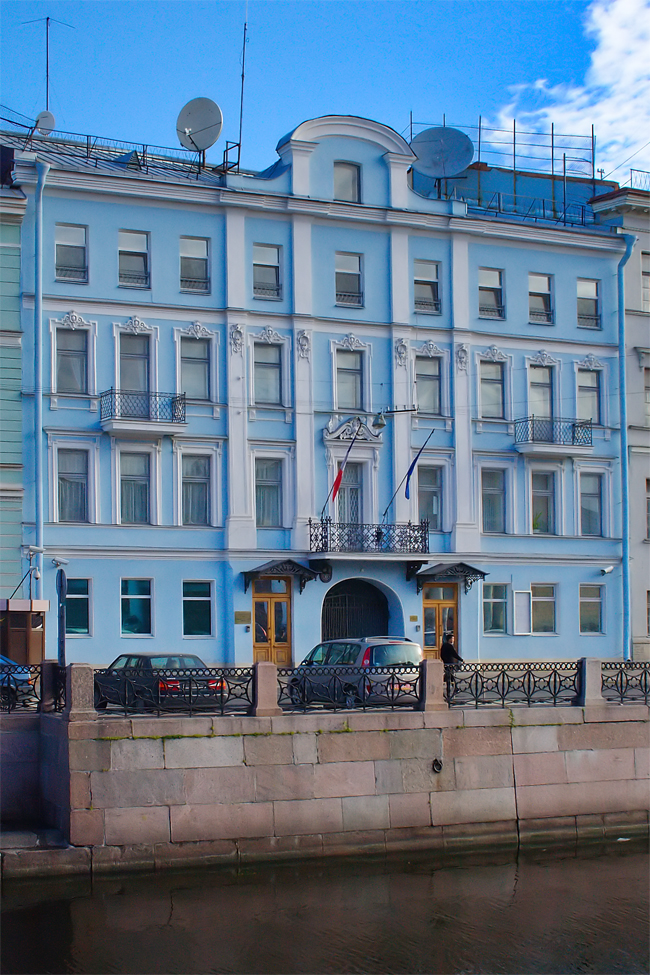
Consulate General in Saint Petersburg

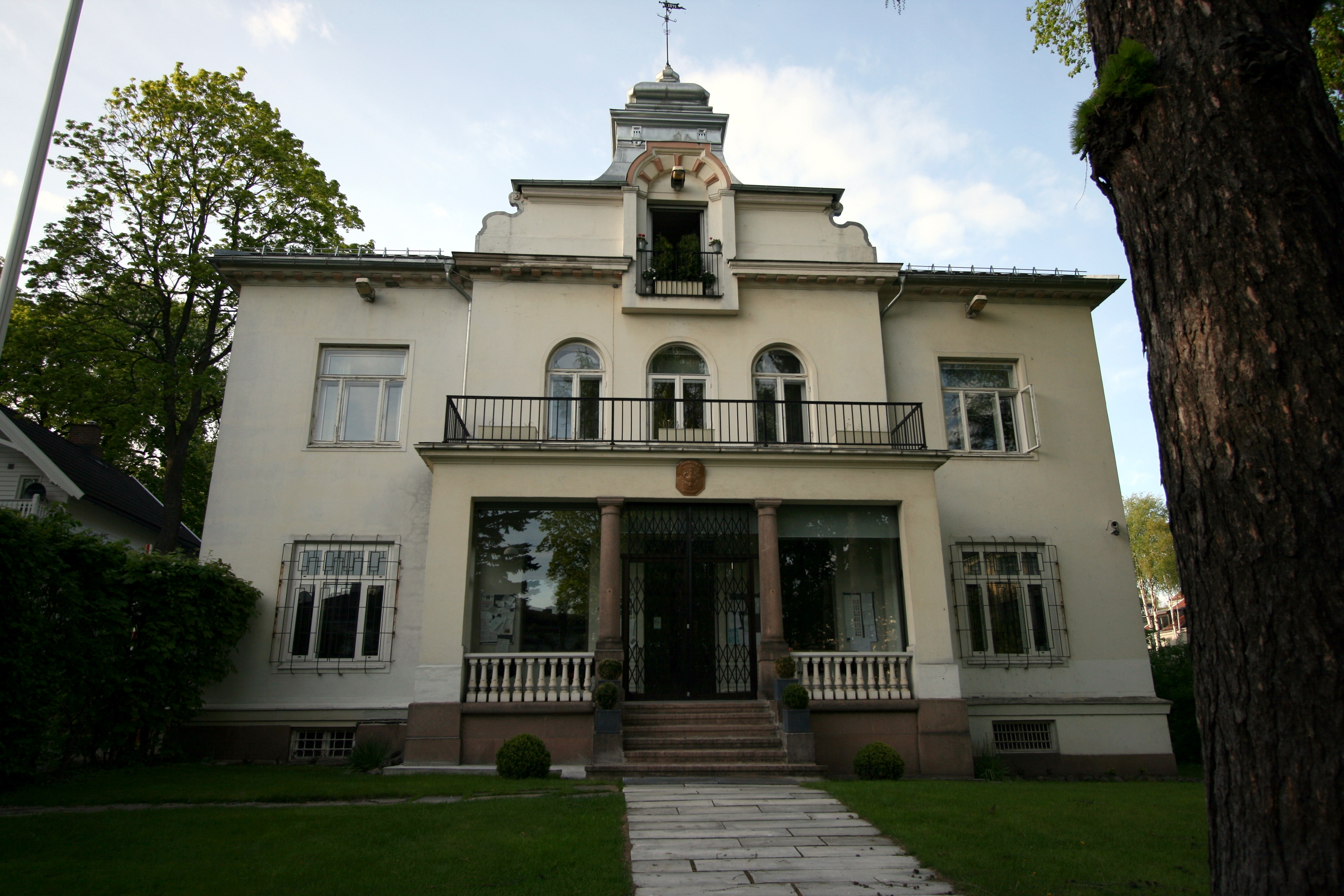
Embassy in Oslo

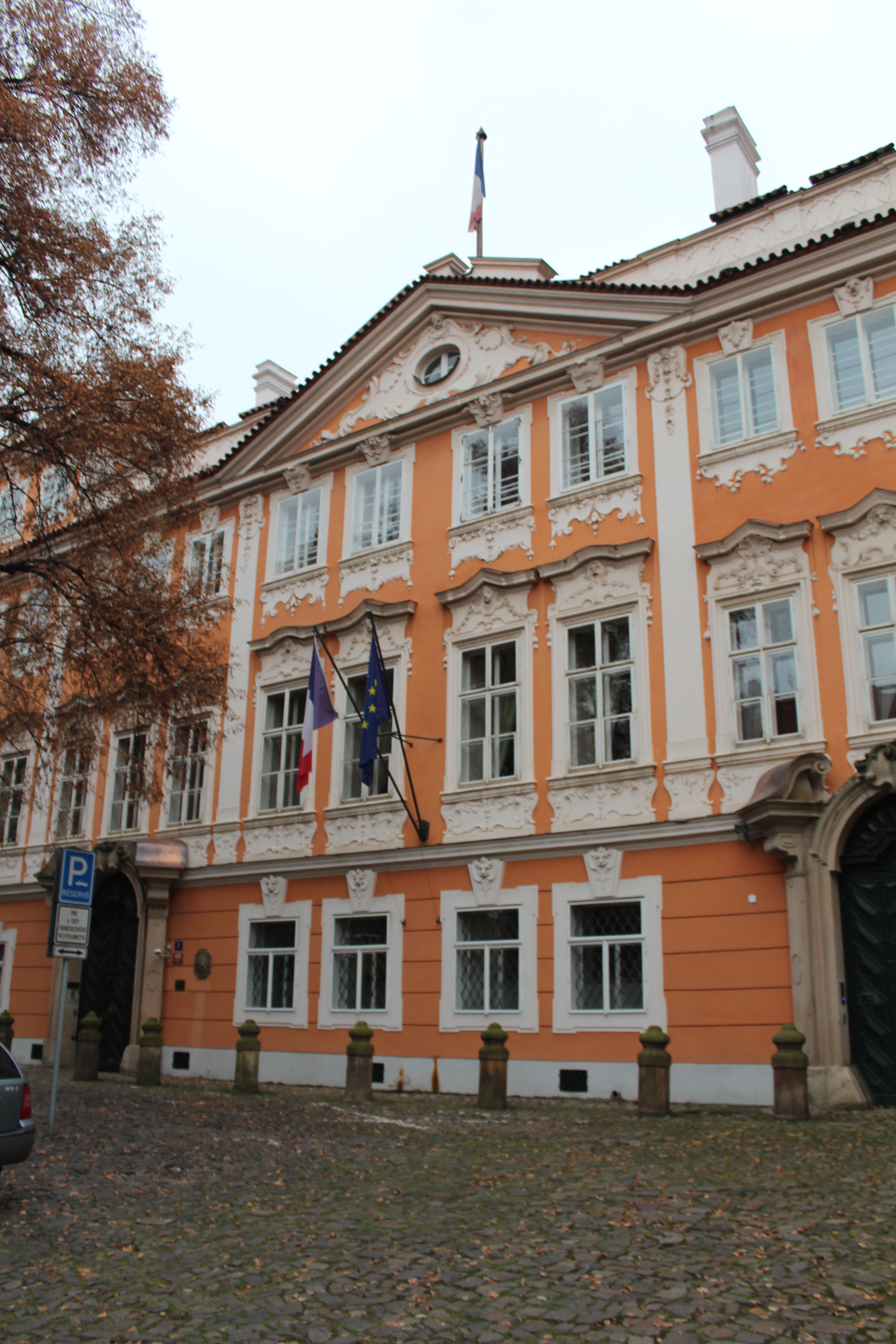
Embassy in Prague

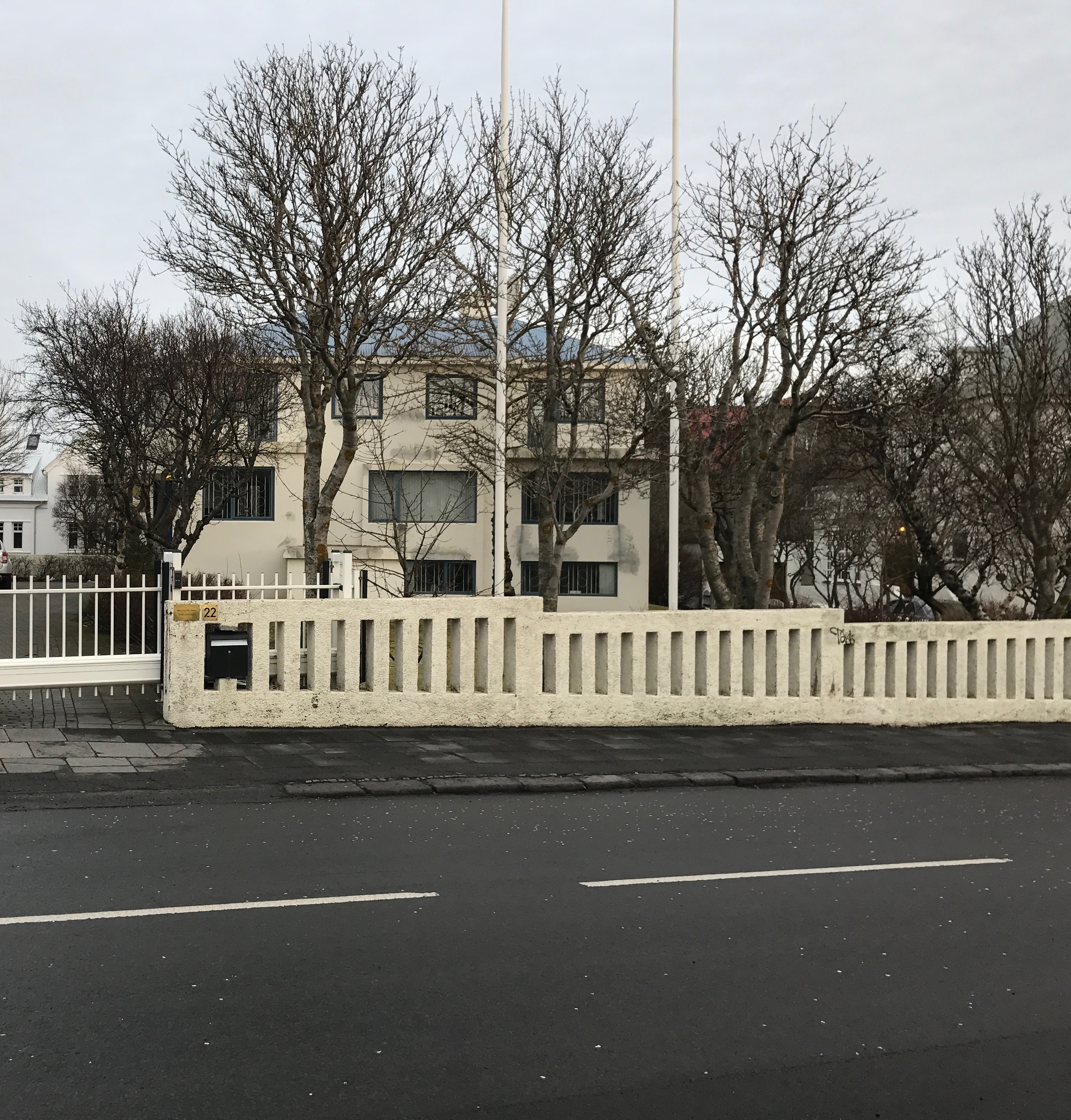
Embassy in Reykjavík

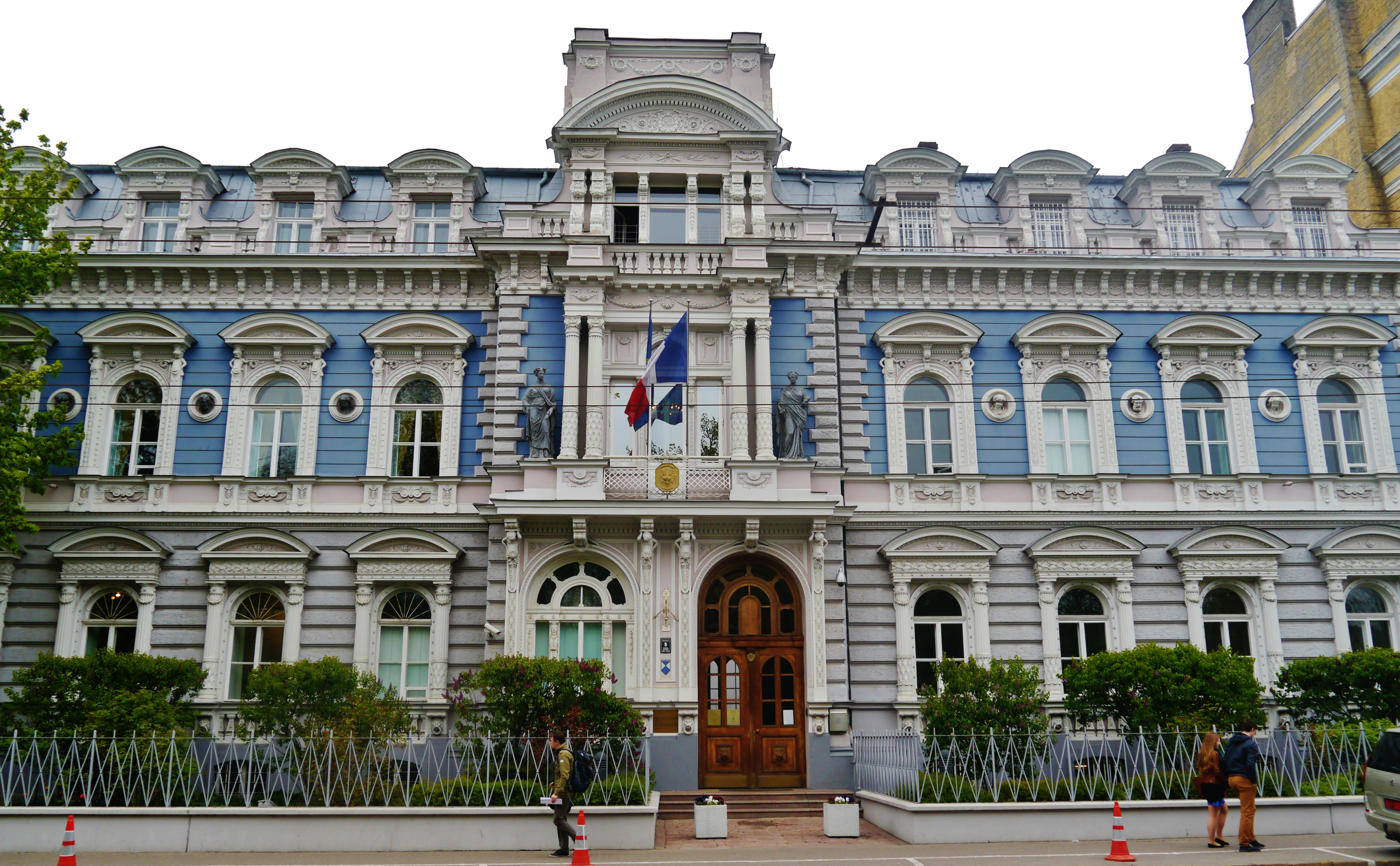
Embassy in Riga

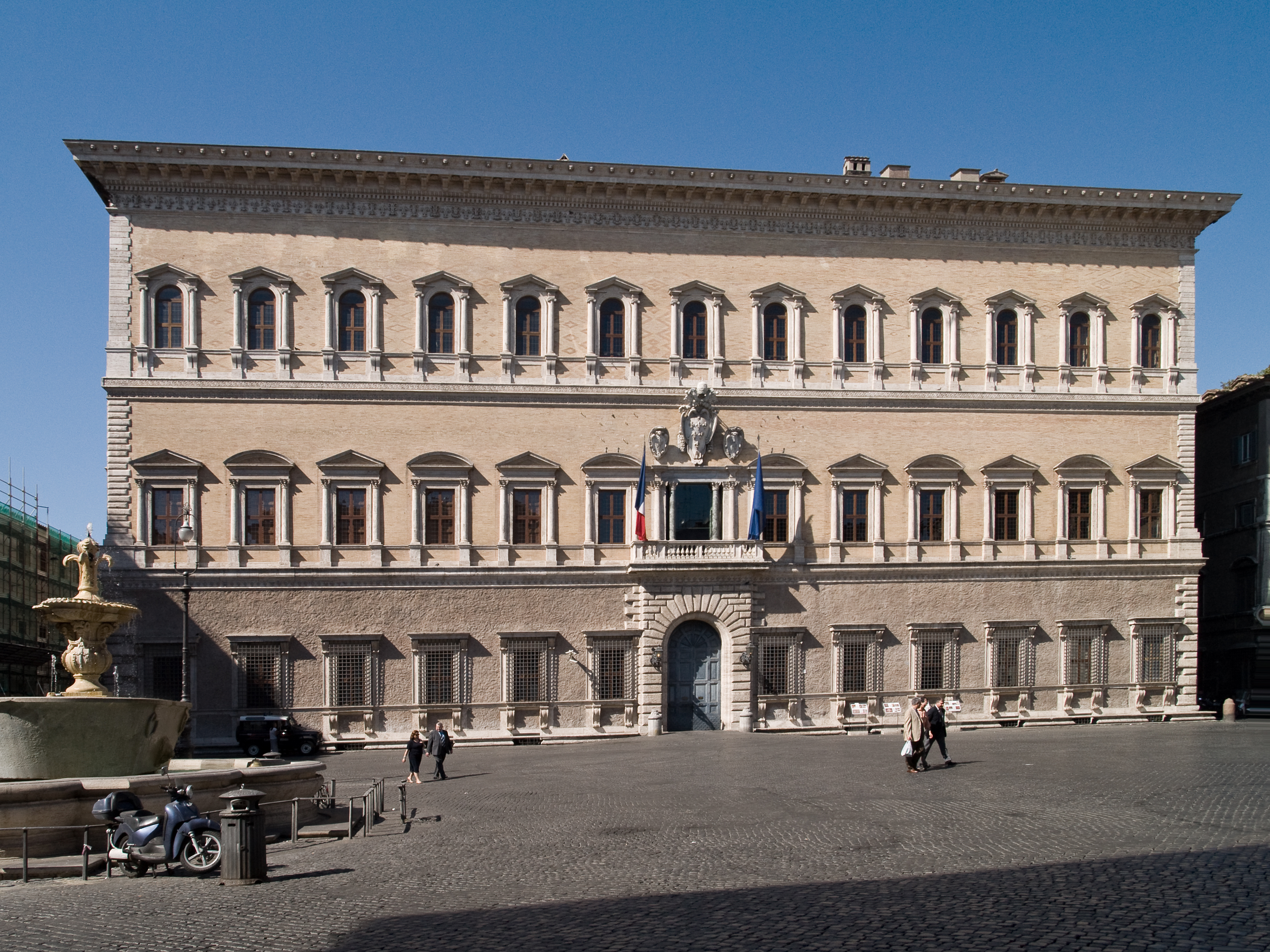
Embassy in Rome

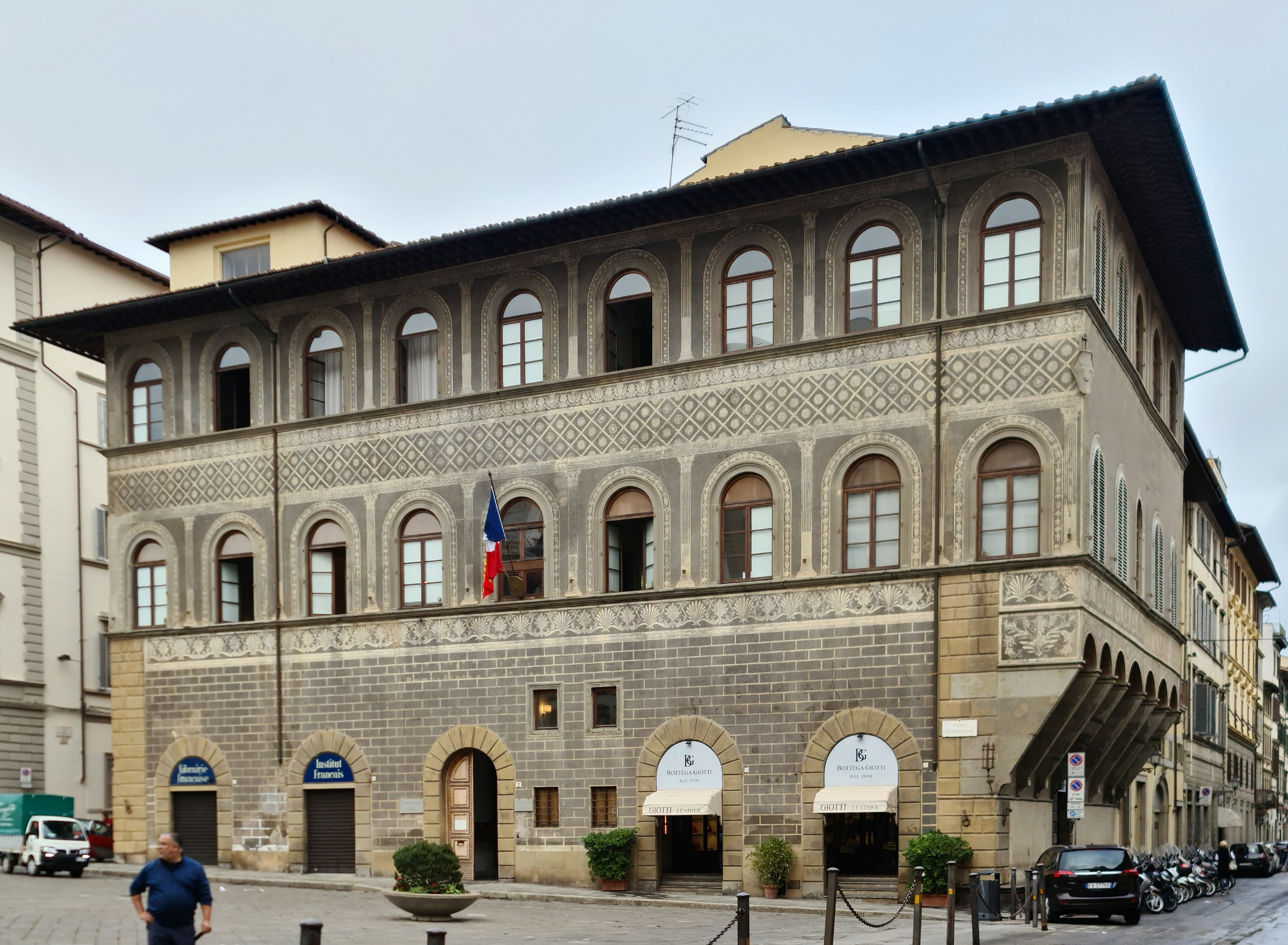
Building hosting the Consulate-General in Florence

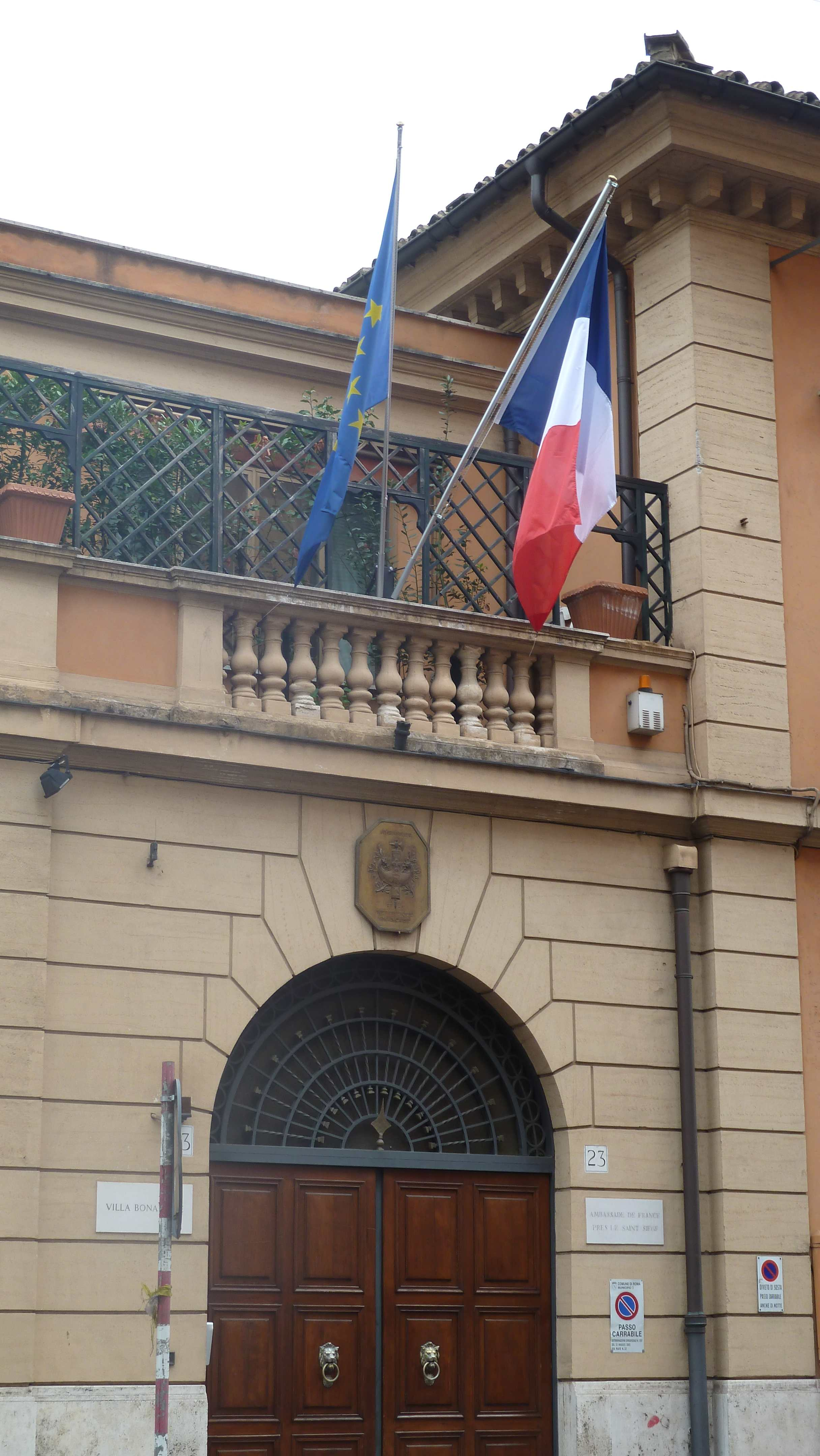
Embassy to the Holy See in Rome

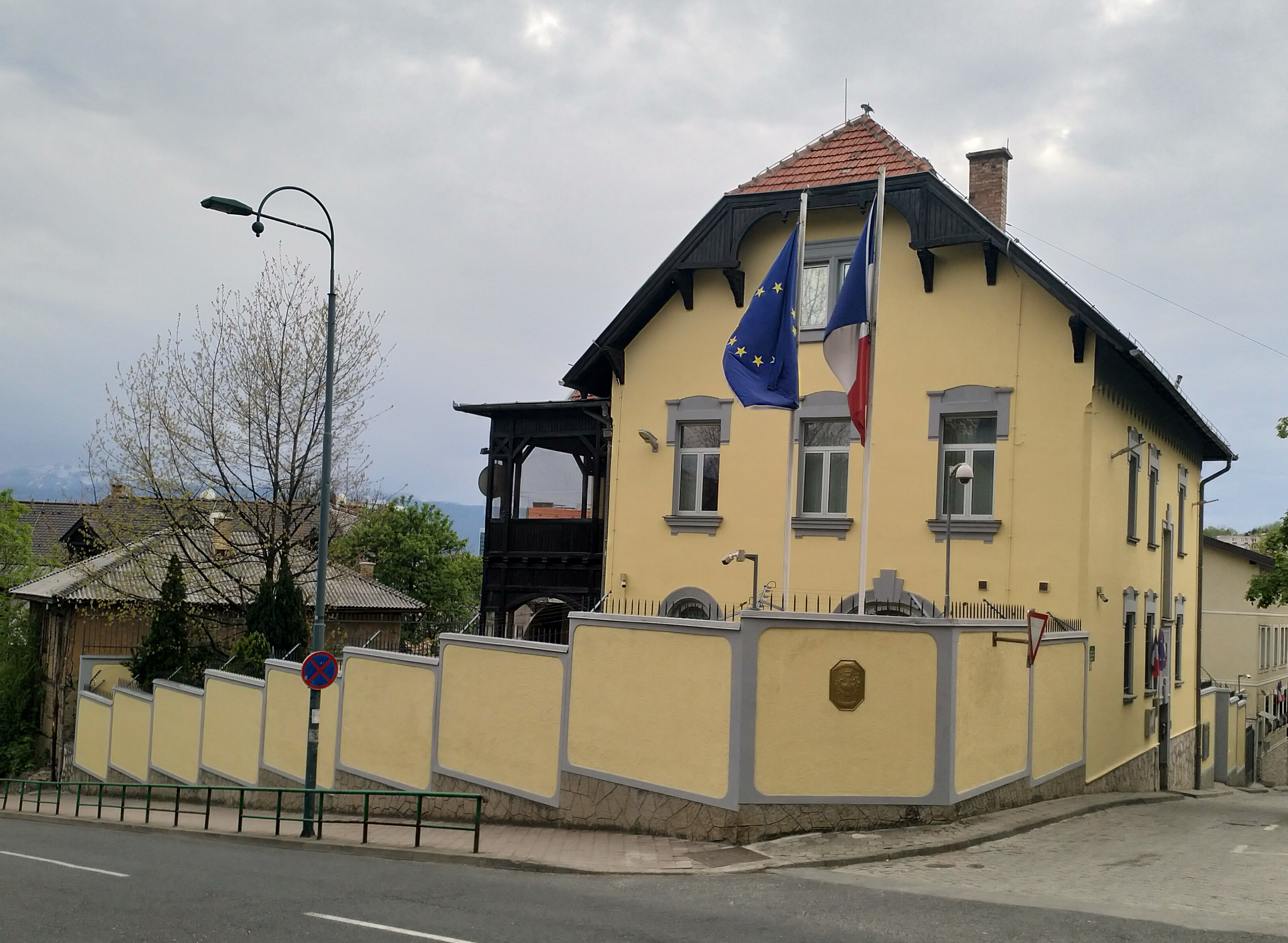
Embassy in Sarajevo

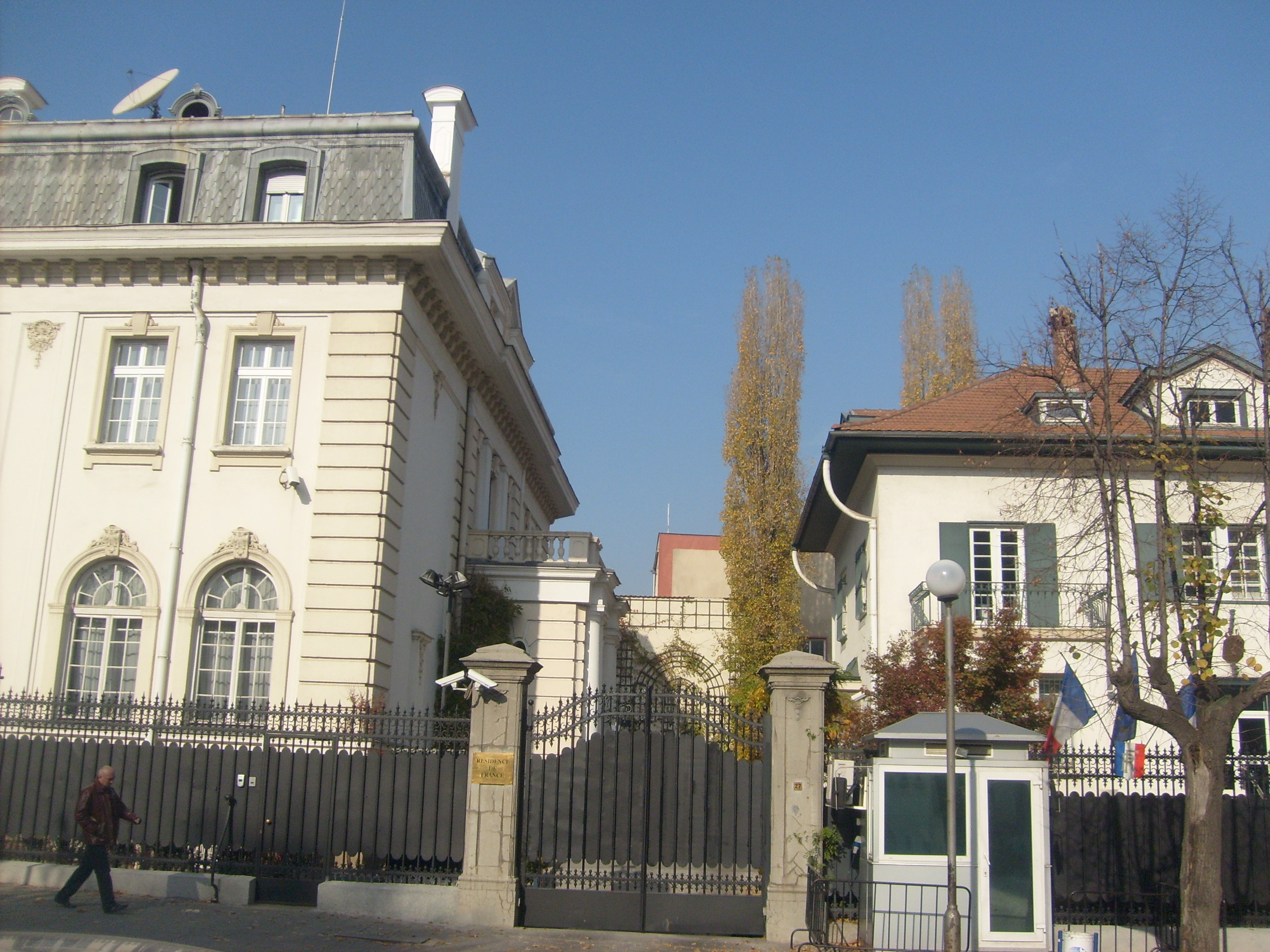
Embassy in Sofia

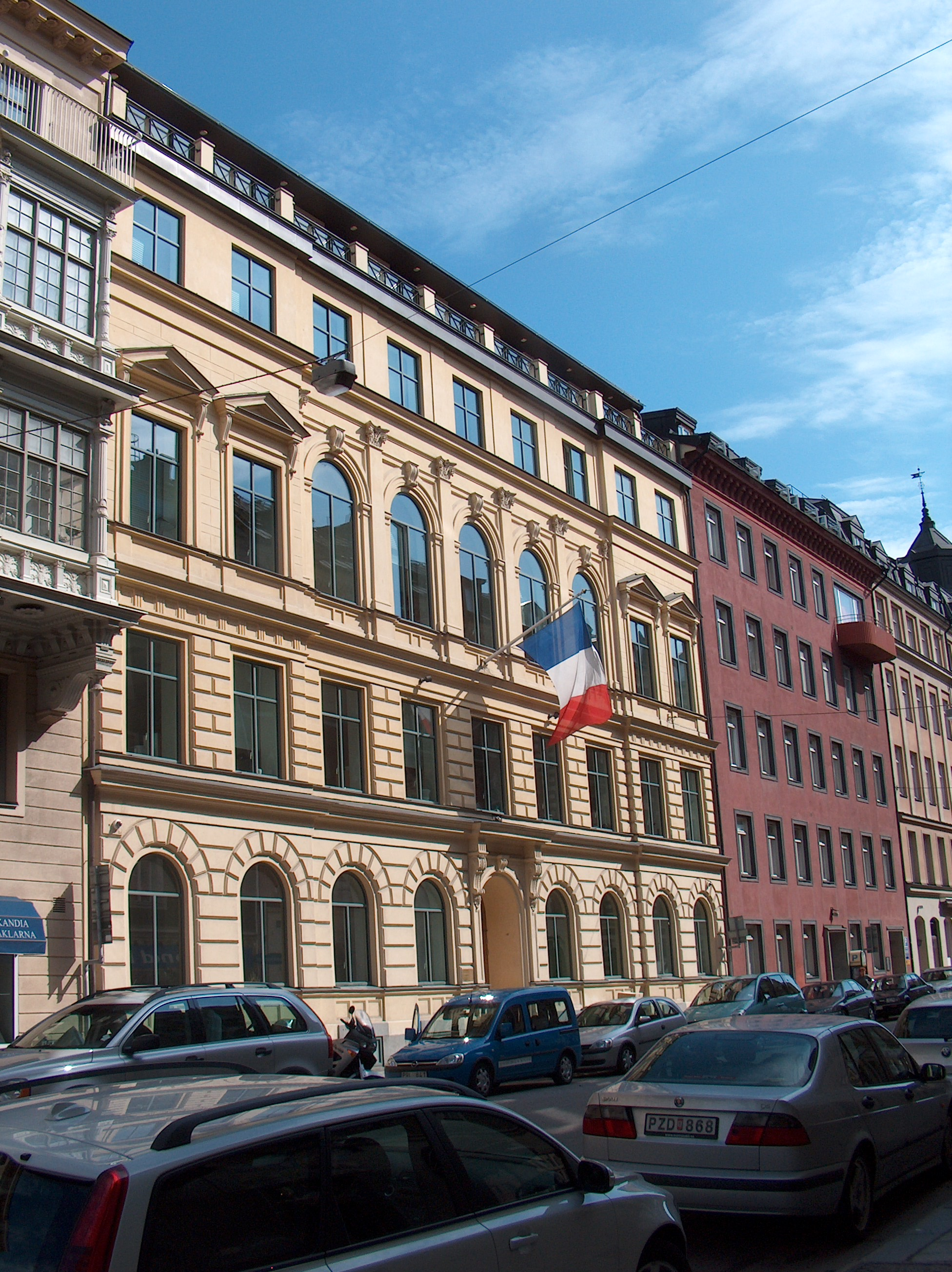
Embassy in Stockholm

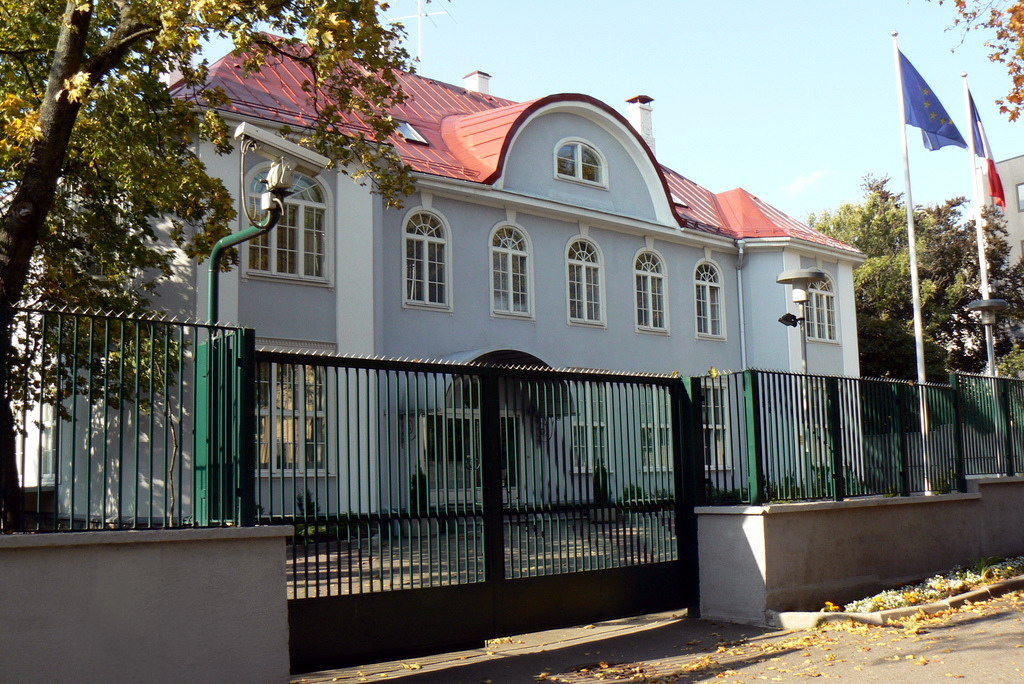
Embassy in Tallinn

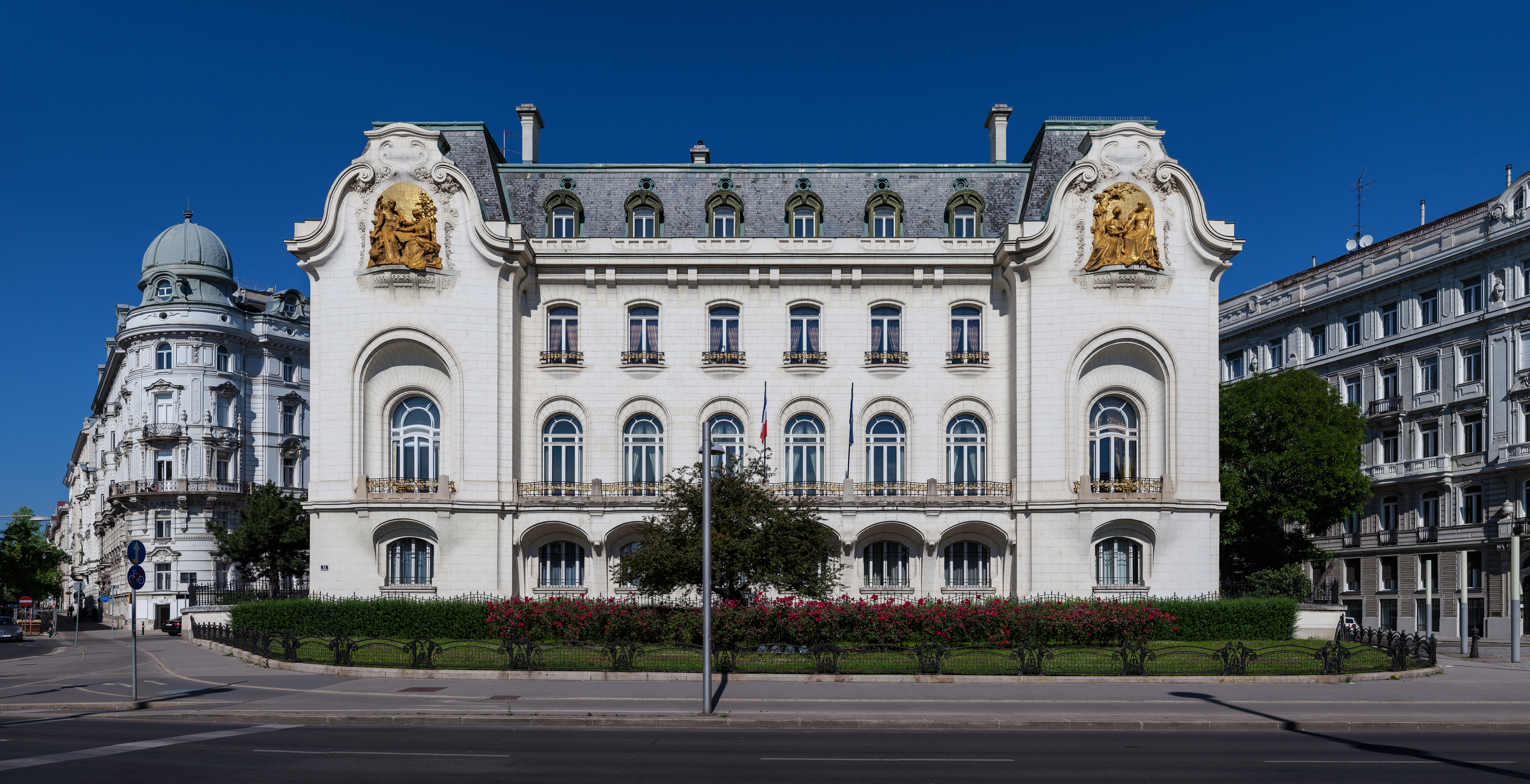
Embassy in Vienna

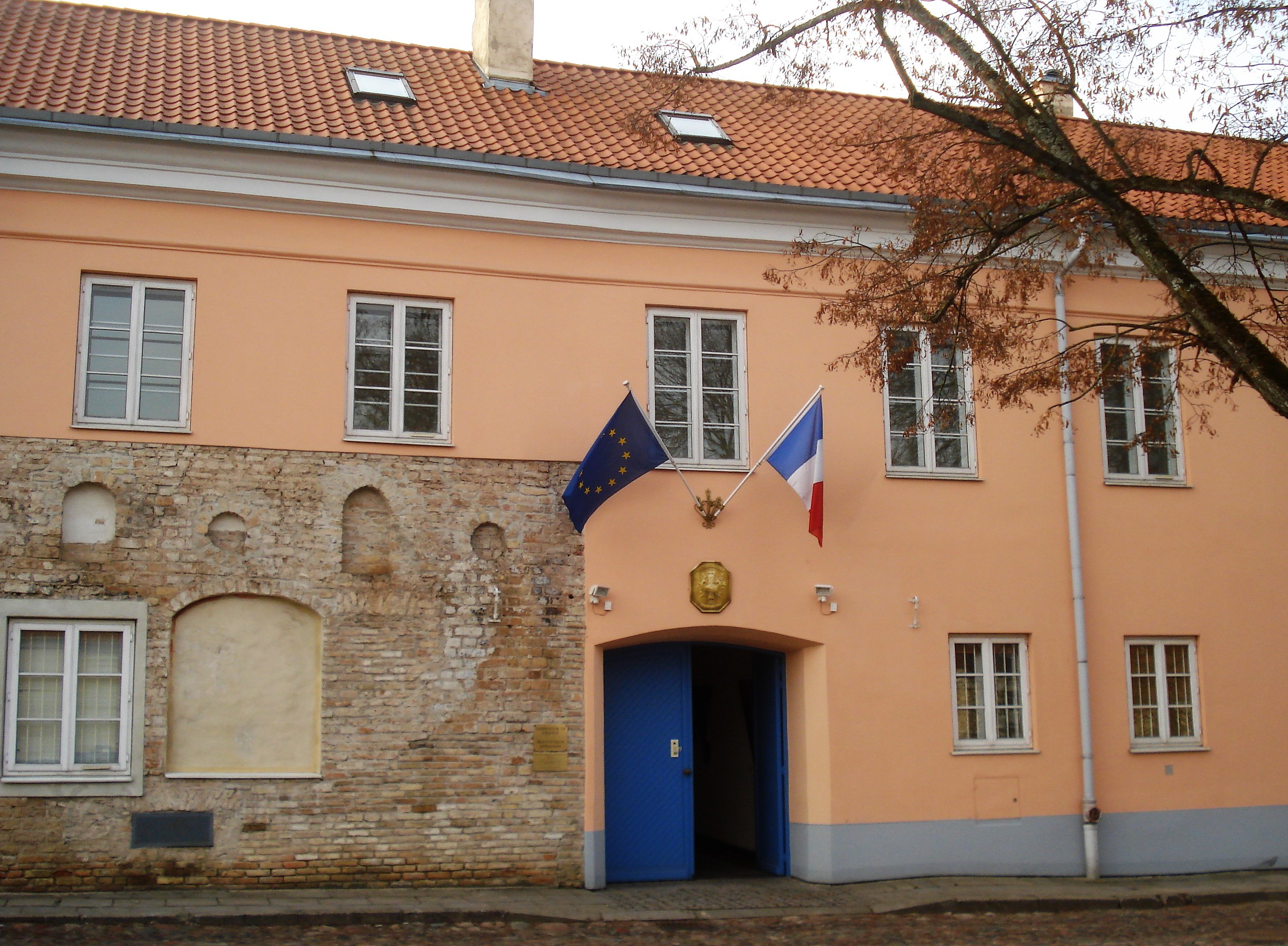
Embassy in Vilnius

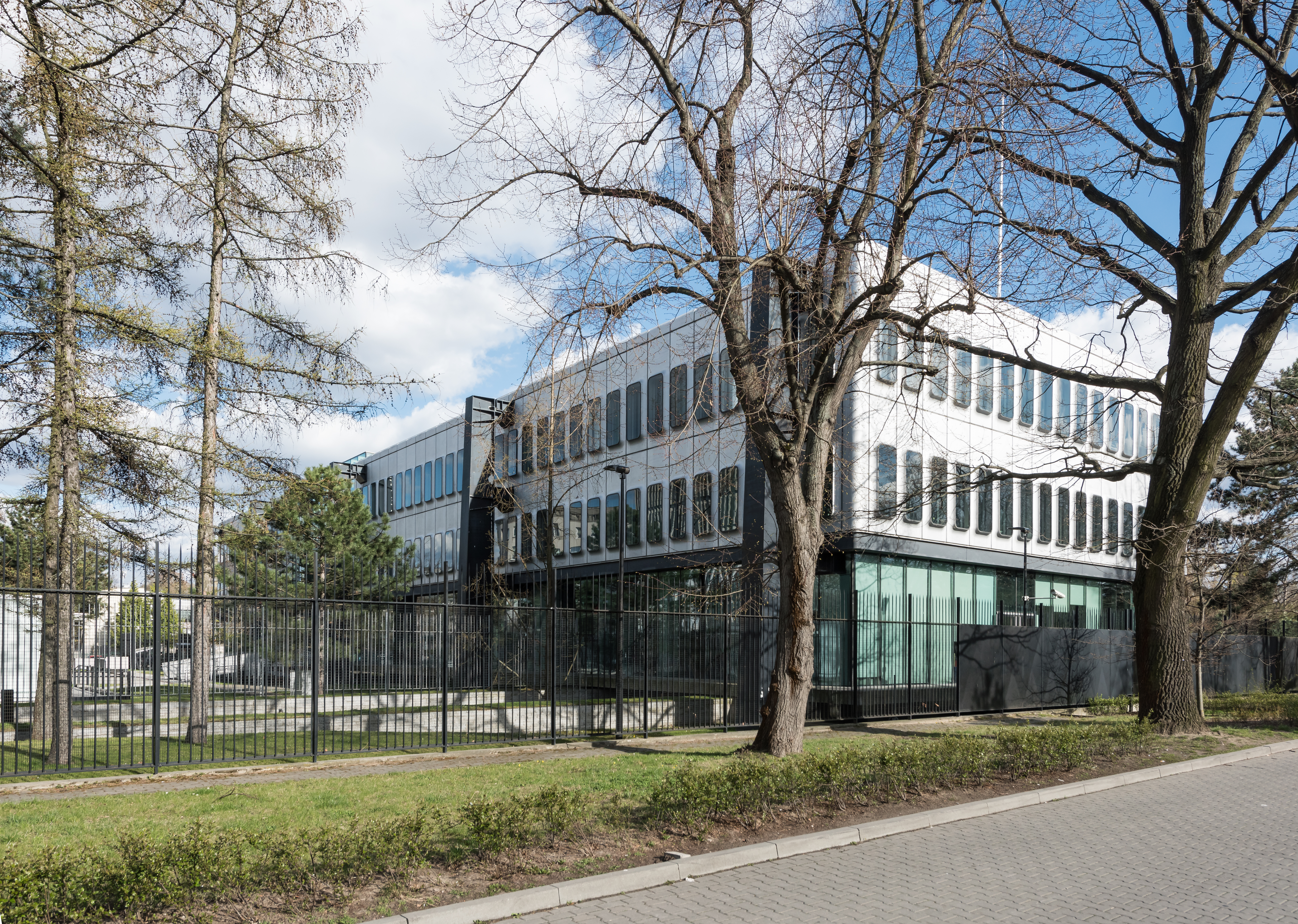
Embassy in Warsaw

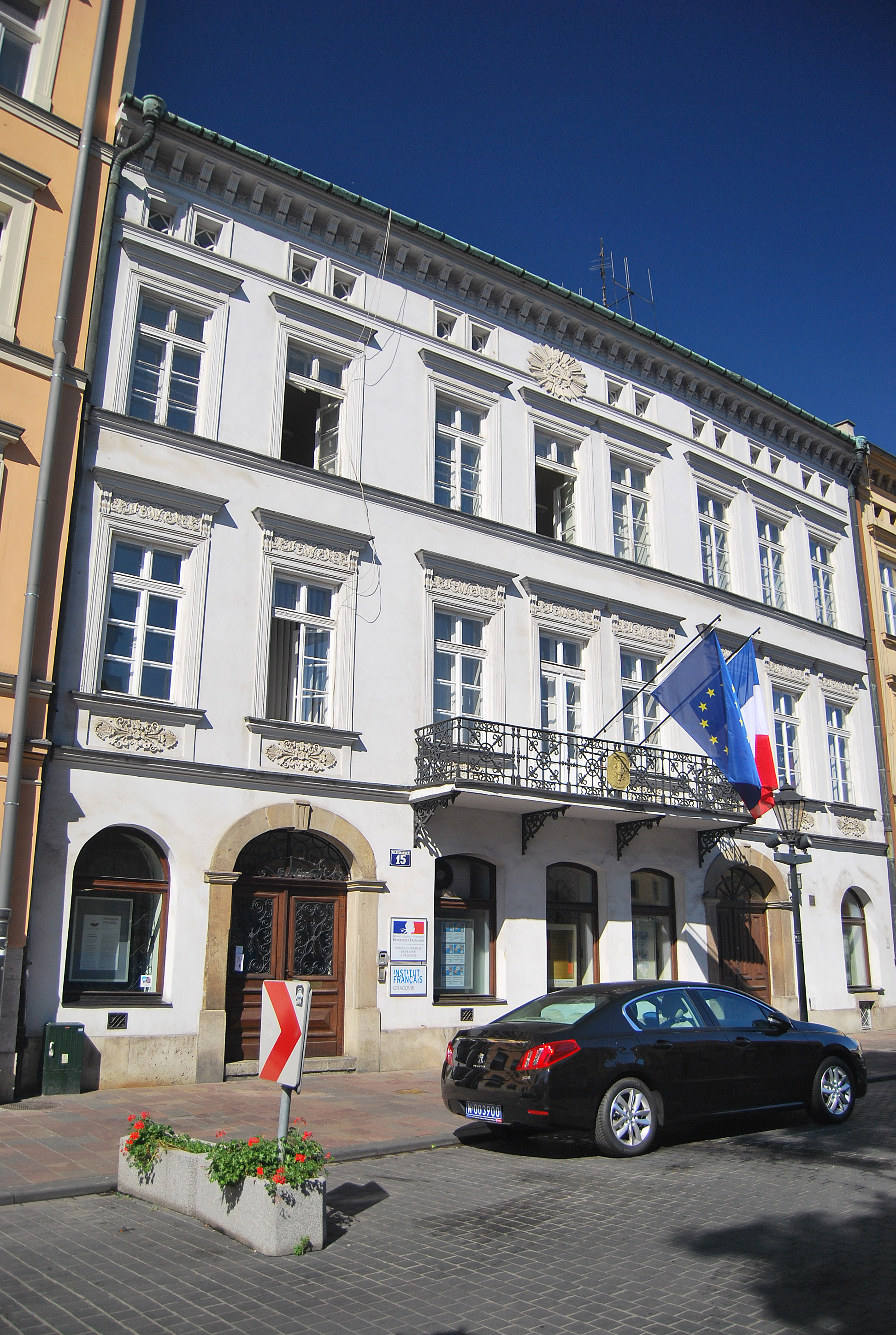
Consulate General in Kraków

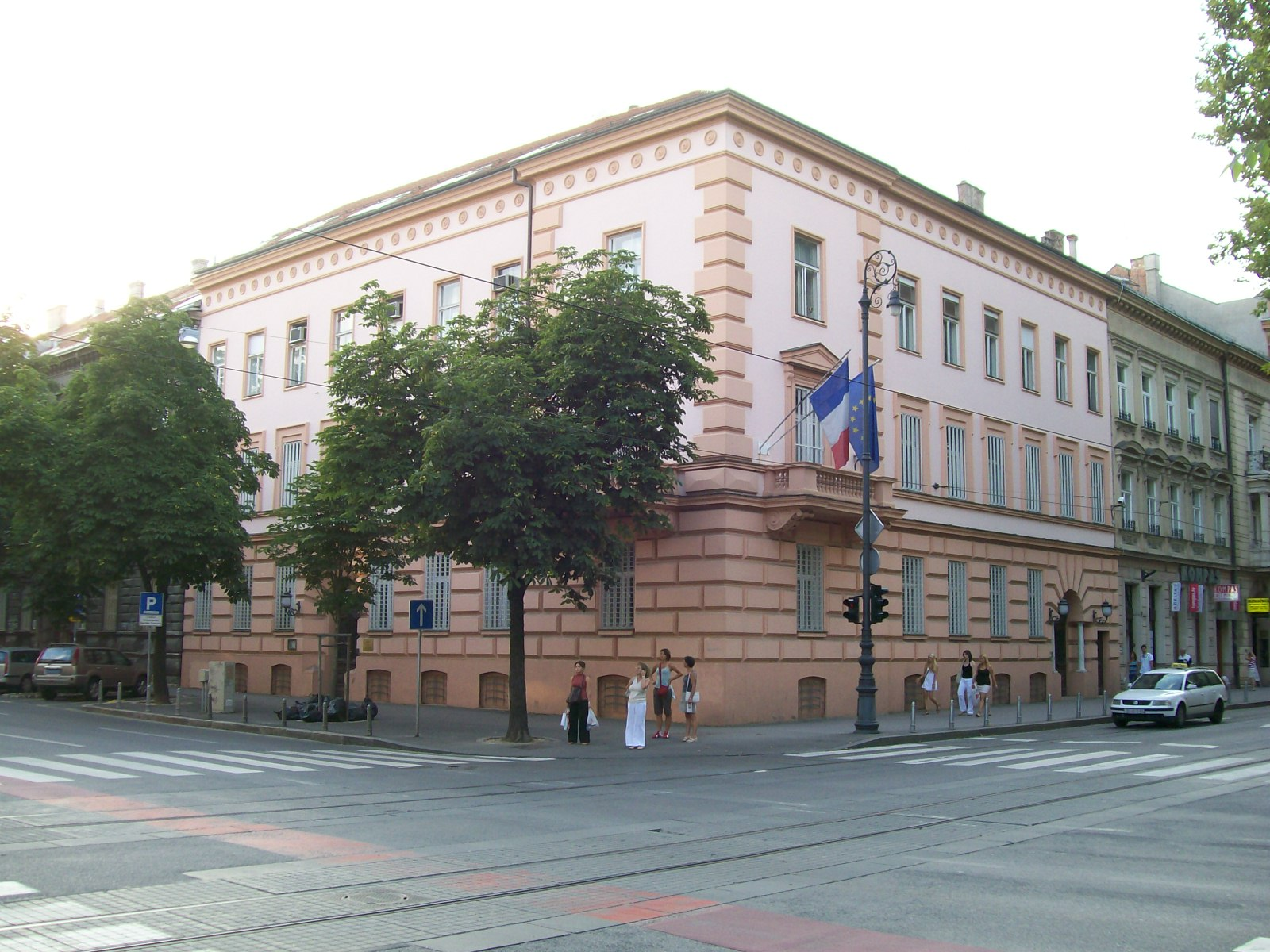
Embassy in Zagreb

=== Oceania ===
Host country	Host city	Mission	Concurrent accreditation	Ref.
Australia	Canberra	Embassy		
Australia	Melbourne	Consulate-General		
Australia	Sydney	Consulate-General		
Fiji	Suva	Embassy	Countries: Kiribati; Nauru; Tonga; Tuvalu	
New Zealand	Wellington	Embassy	Countries: Cook Islands; Niue	
Papua New Guinea	Port Moresby	Embassy		
Samoa	Apia	Embassy		
Vanuatu	Port Vila	Embassy	Country: Solomon Islands	

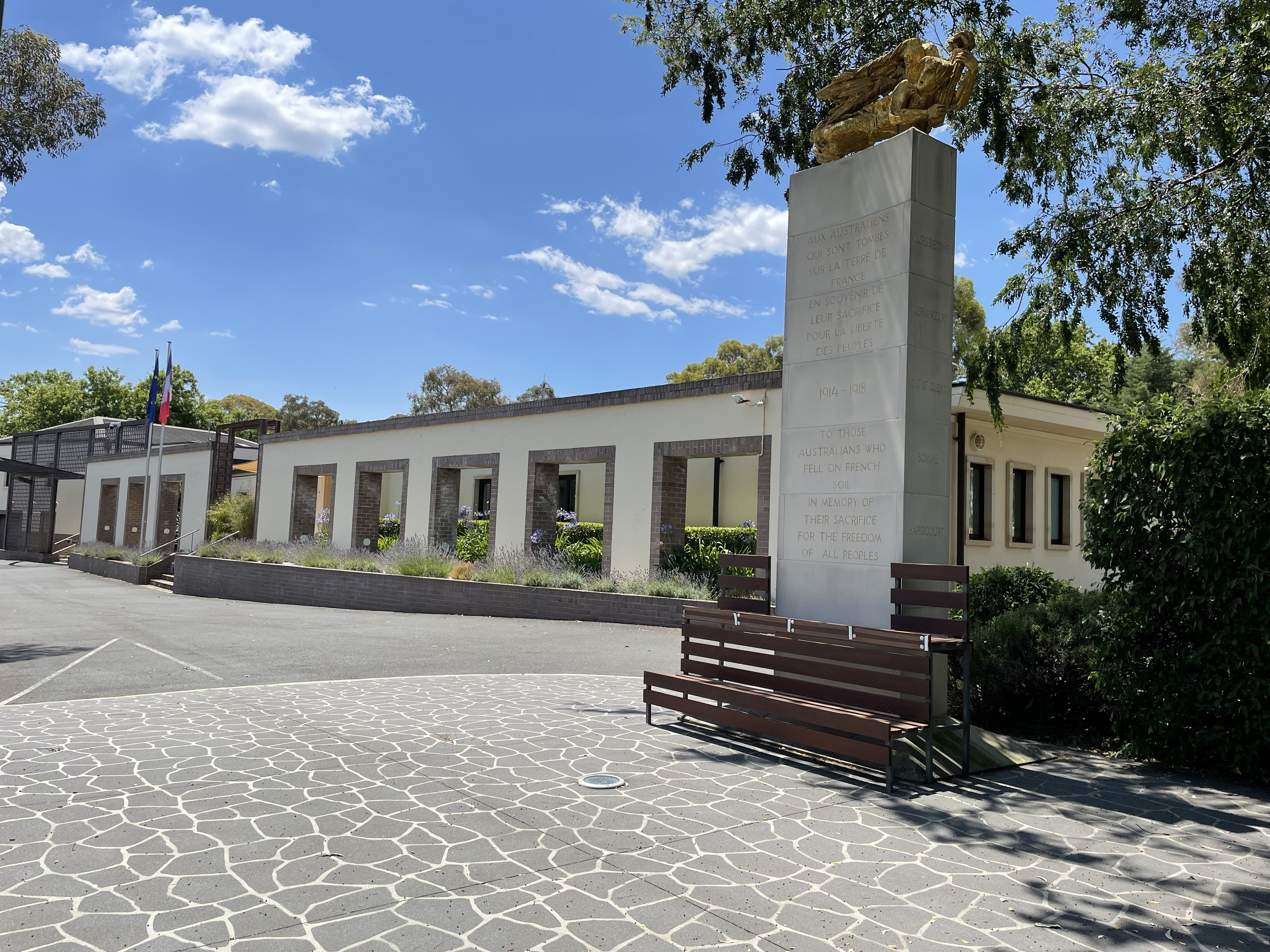
Embassy in Canberra

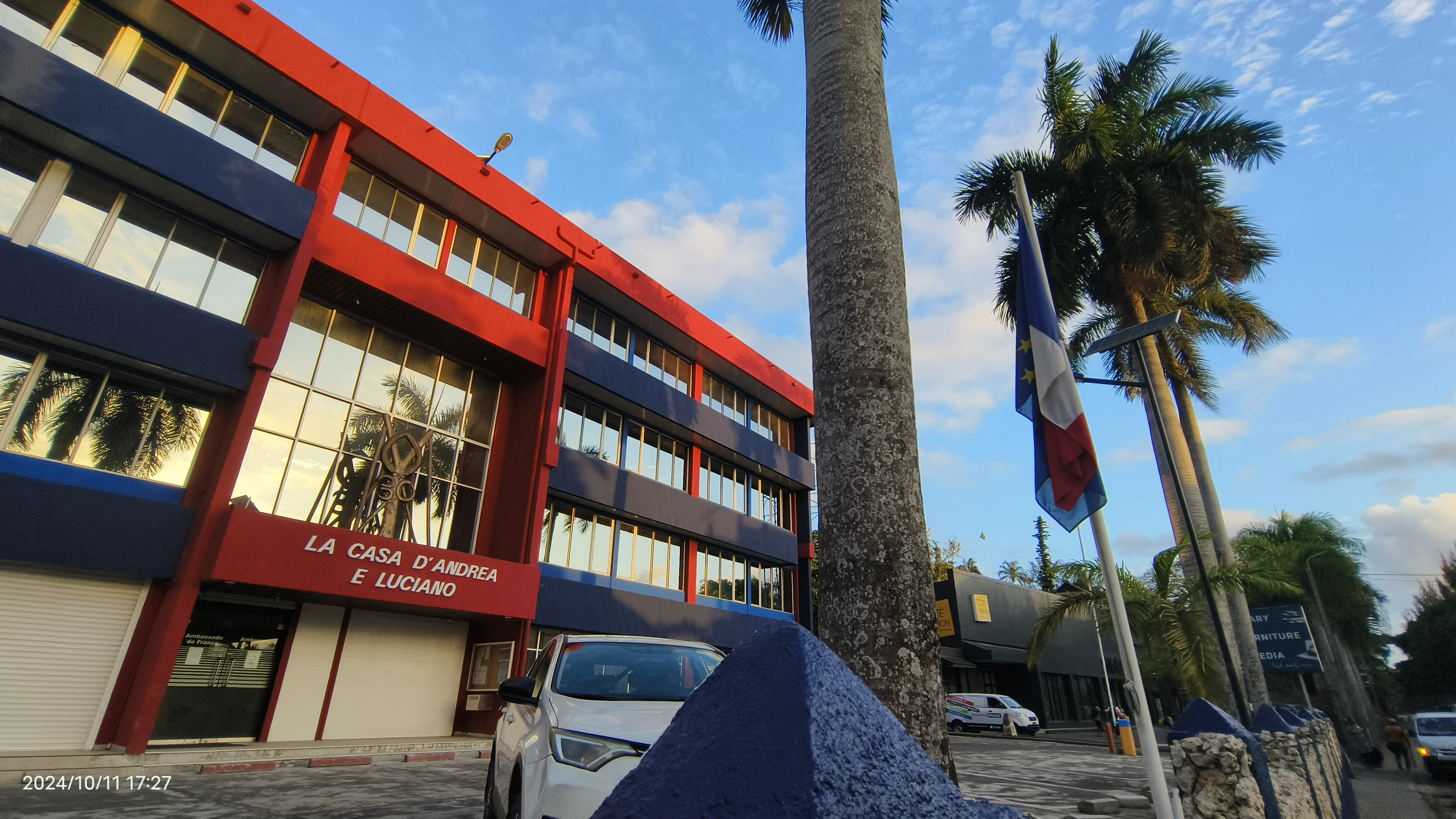
Embassy in Port Vila

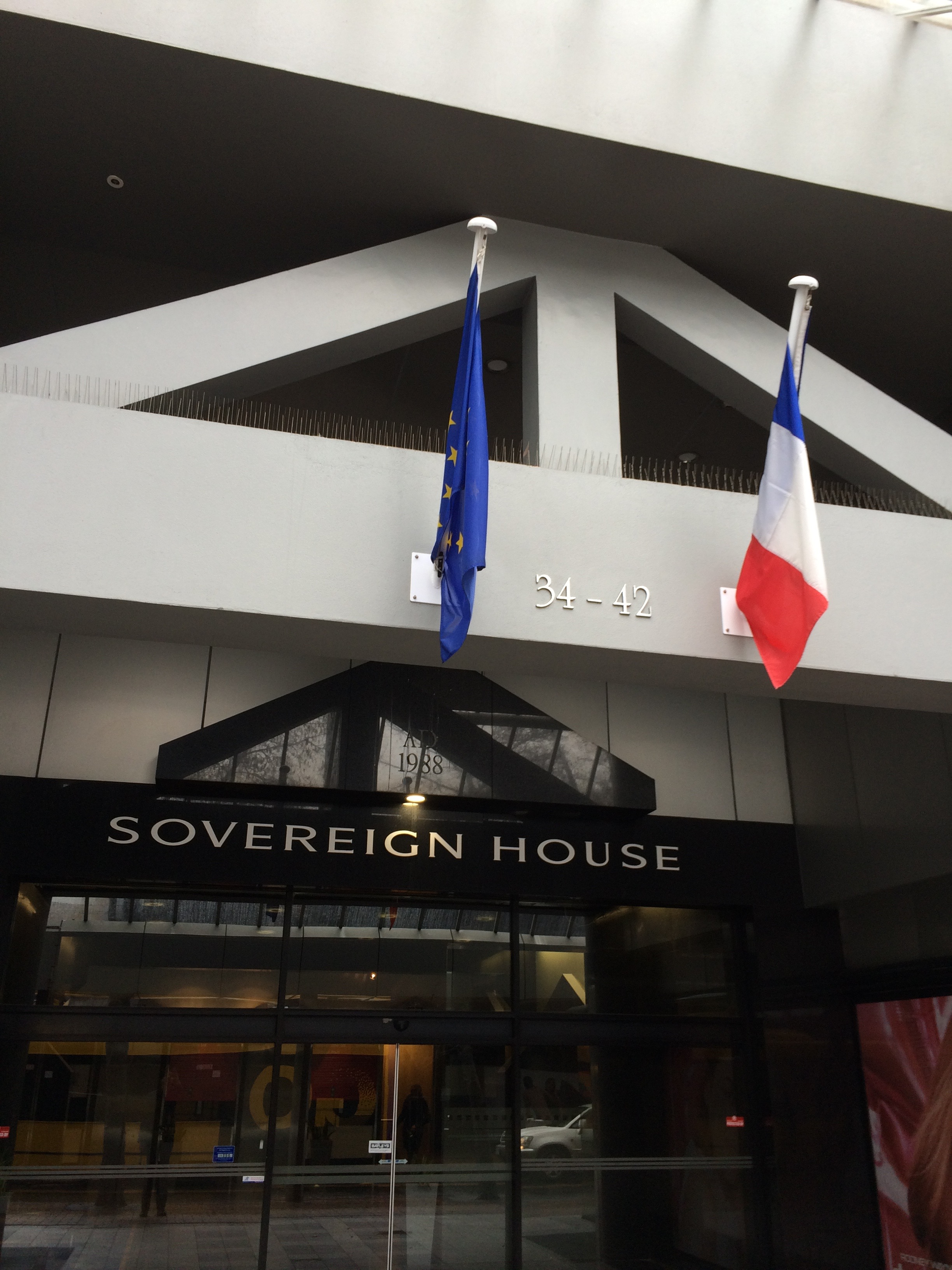
Embassy in Wellington

=== Multilateral organizations ===
Organization	Host city	Host country	Mission	Concurrent accreditation	Ref.
Conference on Disarmament	Geneva	Switzerland	Permanent Mission		
Council of Europe	Strasbourg	France	Permanent Mission		
European Bank for Reconstruction and Development	London	United Kingdom	Delegation		
European Union	Brussels	Belgium	Permanent Mission	International Organization: Political and Security Committee	
Food and Agriculture Organization	Rome	Italy	Permanent Mission	International Organizations: International Fund for Agricultural Development; World Food Programme	
International Civil Aviation Organization	Montreal	Canada	Permanent Mission		
International Maritime Organization	London	United Kingdom	Permanent Mission		
IMF	Washington, D.C.	United States	Delegation		
International Renewable Energy Agency	Abu Dhabi	United Arab Emirates	Permanent Mission		
North Atlantic Treaty Organization (NATO)	Brussels	Belgium	Permanent Mission		
Organisation for Economic Co-operation and Development	Paris	France	Permanent Mission		
Organisation for the Prohibition of Chemical Weapons	The Hague	Netherlands	Permanent Mission		
Organization for Security and Co-operation in Europe	Vienna	Austria	Permanent Mission		
Pacific Community	Nouméa	New Caledonia, France	Permanent Mission		
United Nations	New York City	United States	Permanent Mission		
United Nations	Geneva	Switzerland	Permanent Mission		
United Nations	Vienna	Austria	Permanent Mission		
UNESCO	Paris	France	Permanent Delegation		
World Bank	Washington, D.C.	United States	Delegation		
World Meteorological Organization	Geneva	Switzerland	Permanent Mission		
World Trade Organization	Geneva	Switzerland	Permanent Delegation		

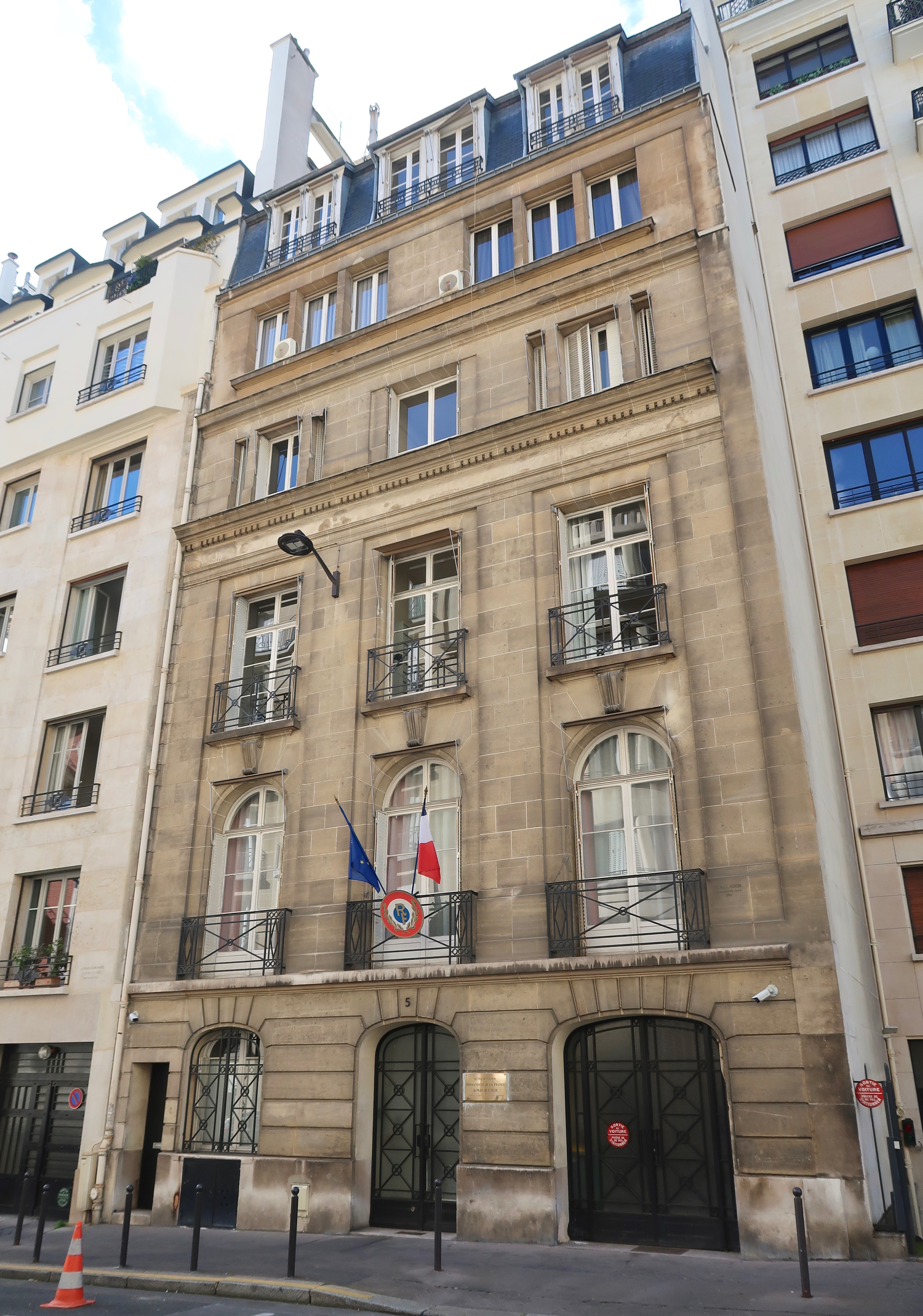
Permanent Mission to the OECD in Paris

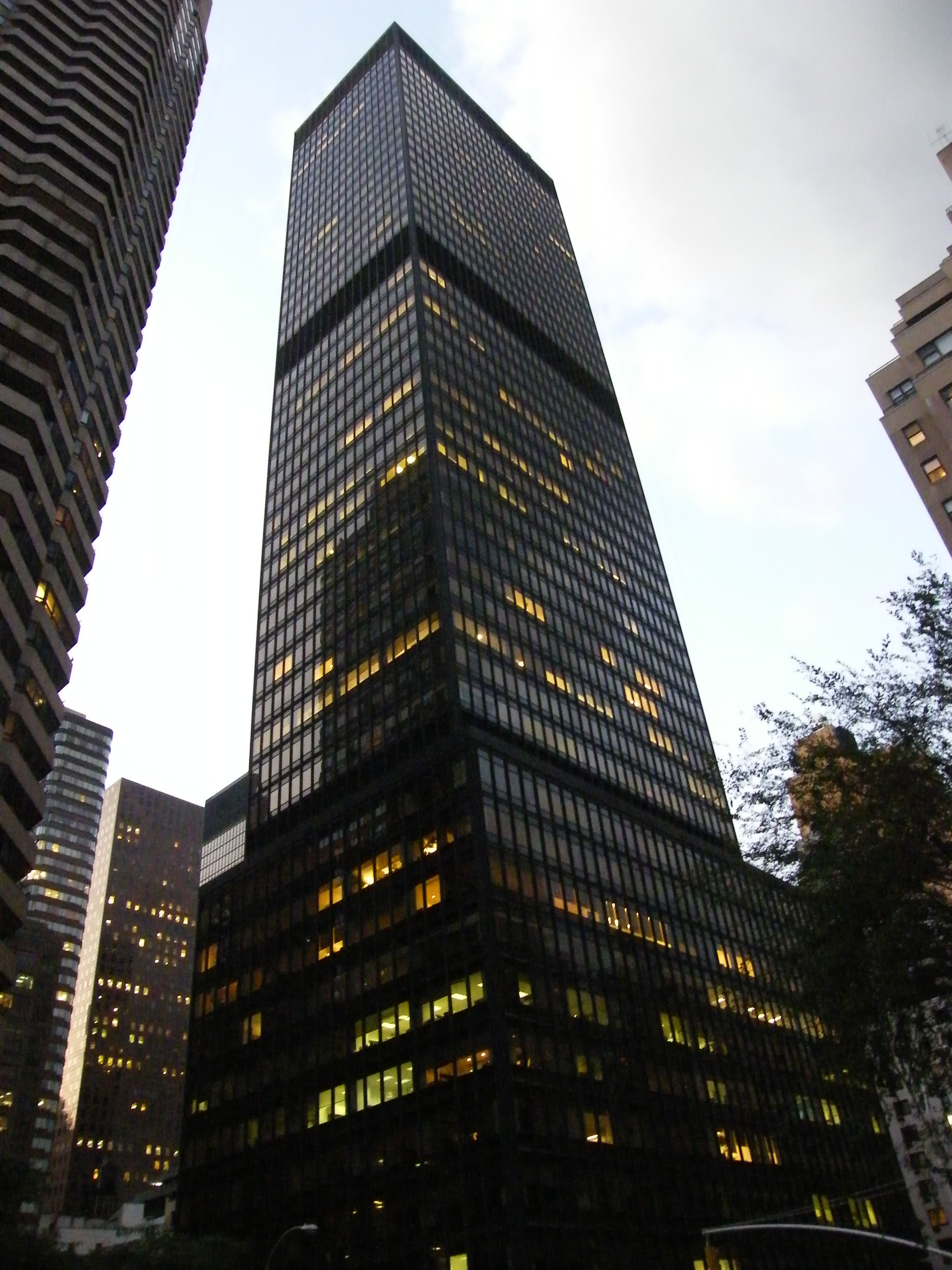
Building hosting the Permanent Mission to the United Nations in New York City

== Diplomatic missions to open ==
- Gambia
- Malawi
- Sierra Leone

== Closed missions ==
=== Africa ===
Host country	Host city	Mission	Year closed	Ref.
Algeria	Constantine	Consulate-General	1991	
Burkina Faso	Ouagadougou	Embassy	2026	
Cameroon	Garoua	Consulate	2009	
Ethiopia	Dire Dawa	Consulate	1980	
Ivory Coast	Bouaké	Consulate	1992	
Libya	Benghazi	Consulate-General	1984	
Madagascar	Fianarantsoa	Consulate-General	1991	
Malawi	Lilongwe	Embassy (Note: Resident in Pretoria, Gauteng, South Africa)	1996	
Malawi	Lilongwe	Diplomatic office	2013	
Niger	Niamey	Embassy	2024	
Senegal	Saint Louis	Consulate-General	2010	
Sierra Leone	Freetown	Embassy (Note: Resident in Conakry, Guinea)	1996	
Sierra Leone	Freetown	Diplomatic office	2014	
Sudan	Khartoum	Embassy	2023	
Zaire	Lubumbashi	Consulate	1991	

=== Americas ===
Host country	Host city	Mission	Year closed	Ref.
Canada	Calgary	Consulate	2009	
Canada	Edmonton	Consulate	1996	
United States	Denver	Consulate	1969	
United States	Honolulu	Consulate-General	1996	
United States	San Juan, Puerto Rico	Consulate	1996	

=== Asia ===
Host country	Host city	Mission	Year closed	Ref.
Afghanistan	Kabul	Embassy	2021	
Iran	Tabriz	Consulate	1969	
Japan	Osaka	Consulate-General	2009	
South Vietnam	Saigon	Embassy (Note: Continues as a consulate-general in Ho Chi Minh City nowadays.)	1975	
Yemen	Sana'a	Embassy (Note: Resident in Djibouti City, Djibouti)	2015	
Yemen	Aden	Consulate	1992	

=== Europe ===
Host country	Host city	Mission	Year closed	Ref.
Austria	Innsbruck	Consulate General	1991	
Belgium	Antwerp	Consulate-General	2011	
Belgium	Ghent	Consulate	1993	
Belgium	Liége	Consulate-General	2011	
Belgium	Mons	Consulate-General	1996	
Bosnia and Herzegovina	Banja Luka	Liaison office	2010	
Germany	Baden-Baden	Consulate	1992	
Germany	Freiburg im Breisgau	Consulate	1992	
Germany	Leipzig	Consulate-General	1999	
Germany	Mainz	Consulate-General	1999	
Italy	Trieste	Consulate-General	1998	
Italy	Venice	Consulate-General	1998	
Netherlands	Rotterdam	Consulate-General	1991	
Portugal	Porto	Consulate General	2015	
Spain	Palma de Mallorca	Consulate	1993	
Spain	Valencia	Consulate-General	1993	
Switzerland	Basel	Consulate-General	1996	
United Kingdom	Liverpool	Consulate-General	1991	

== See also ==
- Foreign relations of France
