= 1914 in Iran =

- Decades
- See also: Other events of 1914; Years in Iran

The following lists events that happened during 1914 in Qajar era.

== Incumbents ==
- Monarch: Ahmad Shah Qajar
- Prime Minister: Mostowfi ol-Mamalek

== Events ==
- 1914 Persian legislative election.

== Births ==
- January 14 – Mordechai Zar, Israeli politician.
- January 16 – Sarkis Djanbazian, Armenian artist.
- May 5 – Mehdi Hamidi Shirazi, Iranian poet.
- June 27 – Youhannan Semaan Issayi, Iranian archbishop.
- August 28 – Davud Monshizadeh, Iranian-Swedish academic.
- September 22 – Djahanguir Riahi, Iranian art dealer.
- October 25 – Maryam Kalali, persian aristocrat.
- ? – Abbas Farzanegan, Iranian military officer, politician and diplomat.
- ? – Abdol Hossein Sardari, Persian statesman and diplomat who saved the lives of many Jews during the Holocaust.
- ? – Aboutorab Naficy, Iranian physician and heart specialist.
- ? – Ali Ardalan, Iranian politician.
- ? – Fereydoun Djam, Iranian politician.
- ? – Iran Teymourtash, Iranian activist.
- ? – Mir Asadollah Madani, Iranian politician.
- ? – Mohammad Ali Qazi Tabatabaei, Iranian religious servant.
- ? – Mohammad Biriya, Iranian Azerbaijani poet and politician.
- ? – Moshfegh Hamadani, Iranian journalist, writer and translator.
- ? – Nayereh Ebtehaj-Samii, Iranian politician.
- ? – Parviz Natel-Khanlari, Iranian scholar.
- ? – Shapour Bakhtiar, Iranian politician.
- ? – Teymur Bakhtiar, Persian military official.

== Deaths ==
- January 21 – Mírzá Abu'l-Faḍl, Iranian Bahá'í scholar and religious writer.
- July 13 – Soltan-Ali Vazir-e Afkham, Iranian politician.
- ? – Agha Najafi Esfahani, Iranian religious leade.
- ? – Akhund Mullah Mohammad Kashani, Iranian Grand Ayatollah.
- ? – Ashraf os-Saltaneh, Persian Qajar member of court, journalist and photographer.
- ? – Roknolmolk, Iranian author and politician.
