= France–Iran relations =

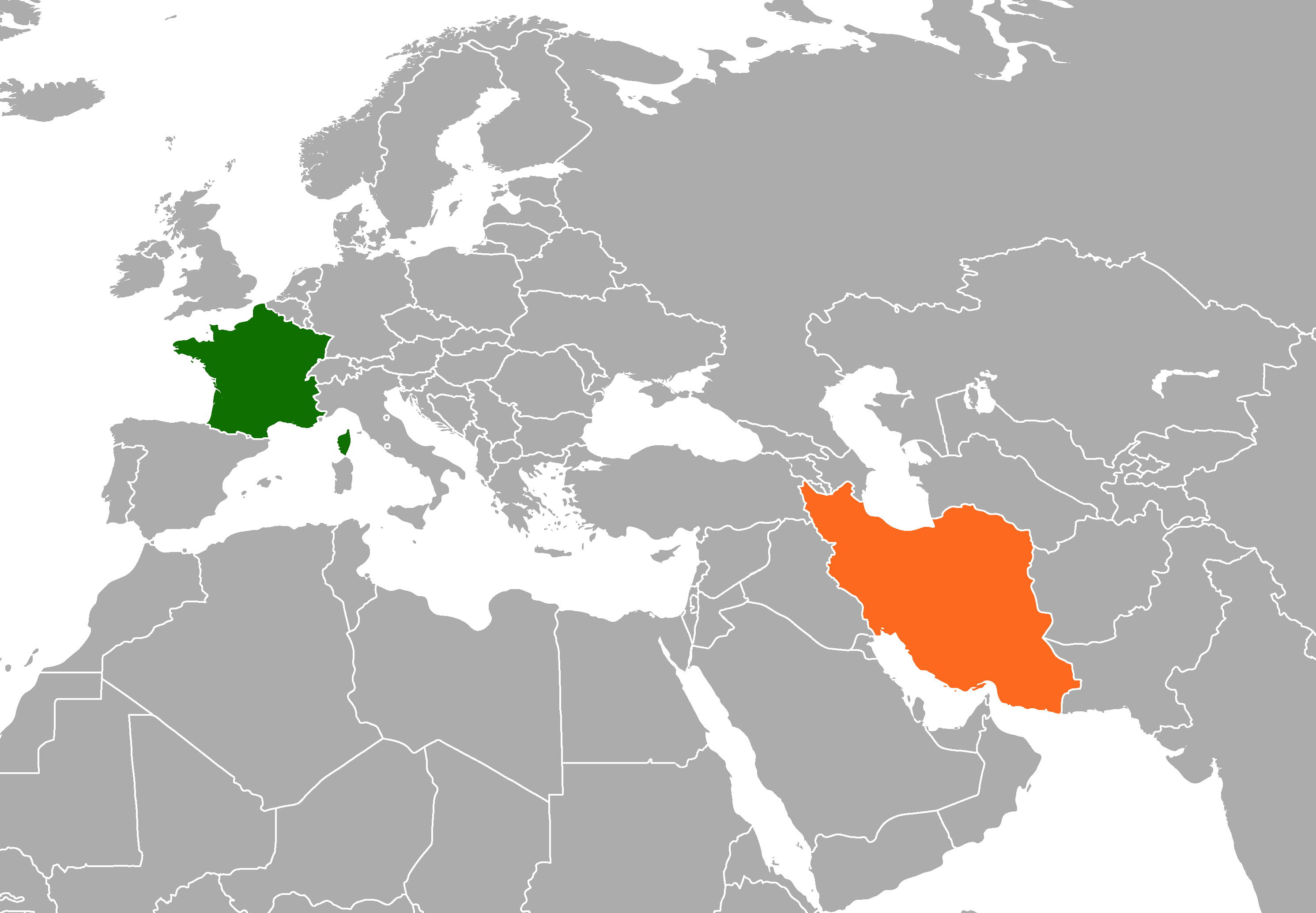

- France: Iran

Diplomatic mission
- Embassy of France, Tehran: Embassy of Iran, Paris

France and Iran maintain international relations. Iran has generally enjoyed a friendly relationship with France since the Middle Ages. The travels of Jean-Baptiste Tavernier to Safavid Persia are particularly well known. France has an embassy in Tehran and Iran has an embassy in Paris.

Recently, however, relations have soured over Iran's refusal to halt uranium enrichment, France supporting the referral of Iran to the United Nations Security Council, and the 2026 Iran war.

== Safavid era ==
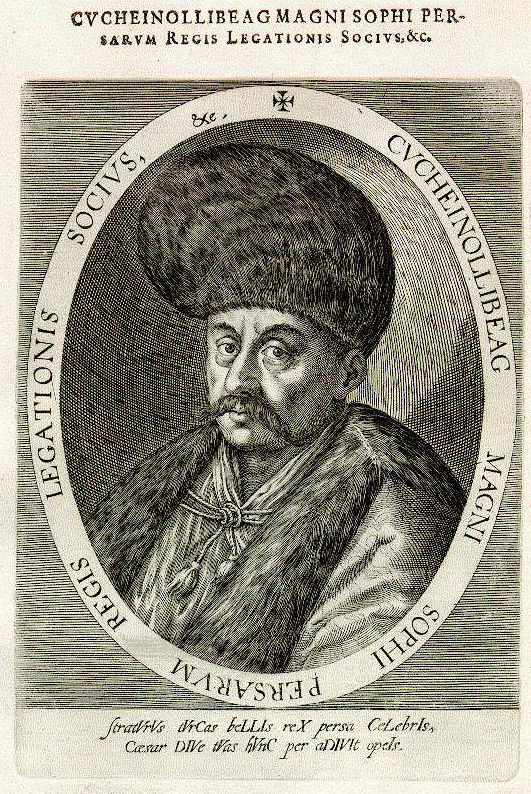
Persian ambassador Hossein Ali Beg. The Persians sent embassies to Europe as early as 1599, but avoided France, an ally of the Ottoman Empire.

In the 16th and 17th centuries, Persia tried to obtain support among European nations against the expansionism of the Portuguese and the neighbouring Ottoman Empire. Since France was tied into an Ottoman alliance, however, the Persian embassy to Europe of 1599–1602 and the Persian embassy to Europe of 1609–1615 avoided France.

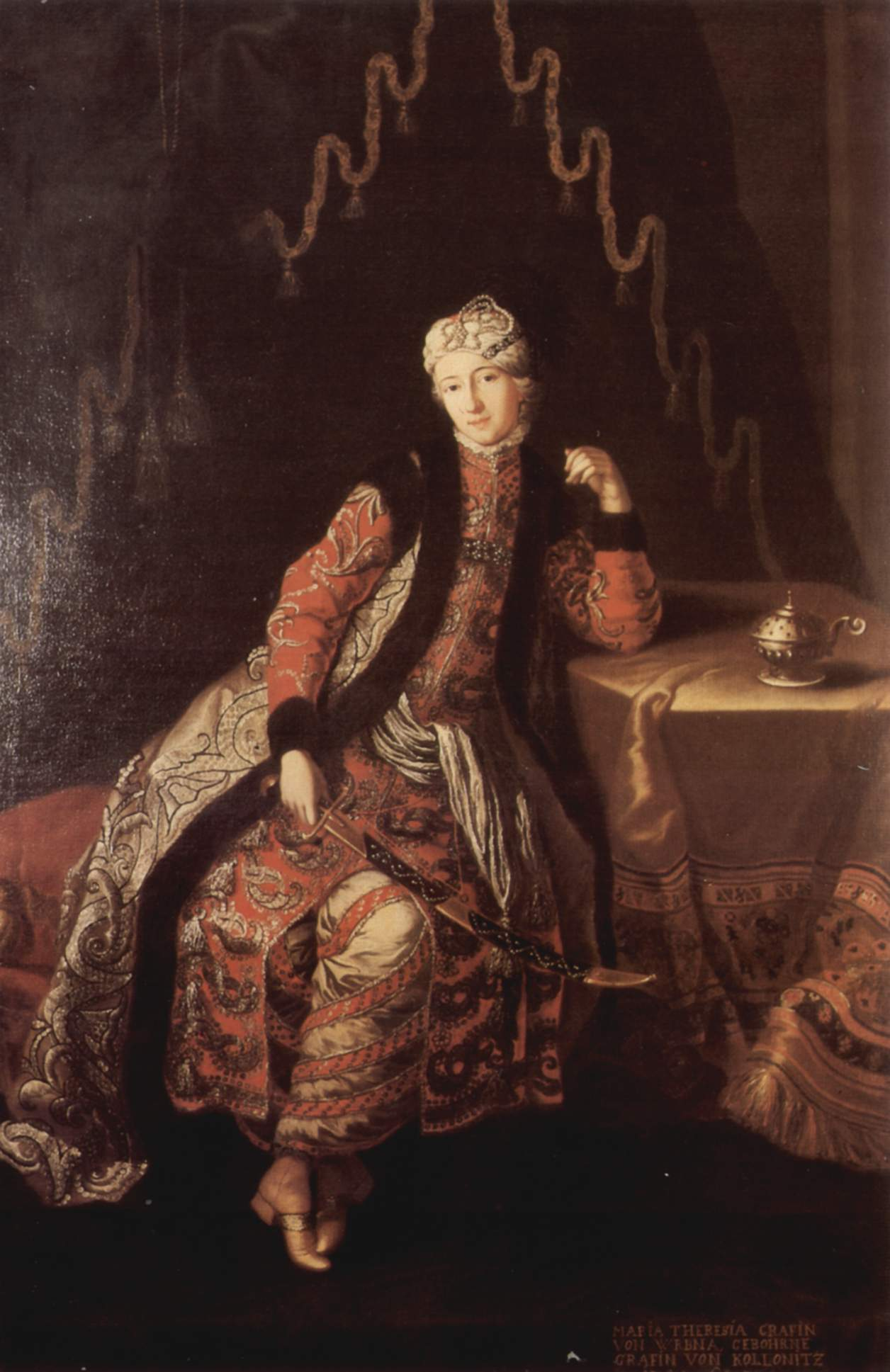
Portrait of Jean-Baptiste Tavernier by Nicolas de Largillière (c. 1700).

First contact was established in the 1620s when French Catholics became interested in the cause of foreign missions, especially after the foundation of the Propaganda Fides. In 1627, a Capuchin mission under Pacifique de Provins was dispatched to Persia and was able to establish good relations with Shah Abbas, persuading him to reverse long-standing Anti-Christian laws, especially for Catholics in Iran. At the same time, trade relations were slowly established and the French trader Jean-Baptiste Tavernier (1605–1689) is known to have been as far as Isfahan circa 1632.

Relations took an official turn under Louis XIV and Colbert, when Colbert founded the French East India Company in 1664, and subsequently asked Lalain and Laboulaye to go to Ispahan to promote French interests in Persia. The Shah welcomed them as he was delighted to be given an opportunity to counterbalance English and Dutch influence in his country. He provided a three-year exemption from customs duties, and gave France the same privileges as other countries. Further, a trading post was given to France in Bandar Abbas.

Another French trader Jean Chardin (1643–1715) visited Persia and received the patronage of the Safavid monarch Shah Abbas II and his son Shah Suleiman I. Chardin returned to France in 1670. The following year, he published an account of Le Couronnement de Soleïmaan (English translation: The Coronation of Shah Soleiman). He again visited Persia between 1673 and 1680.

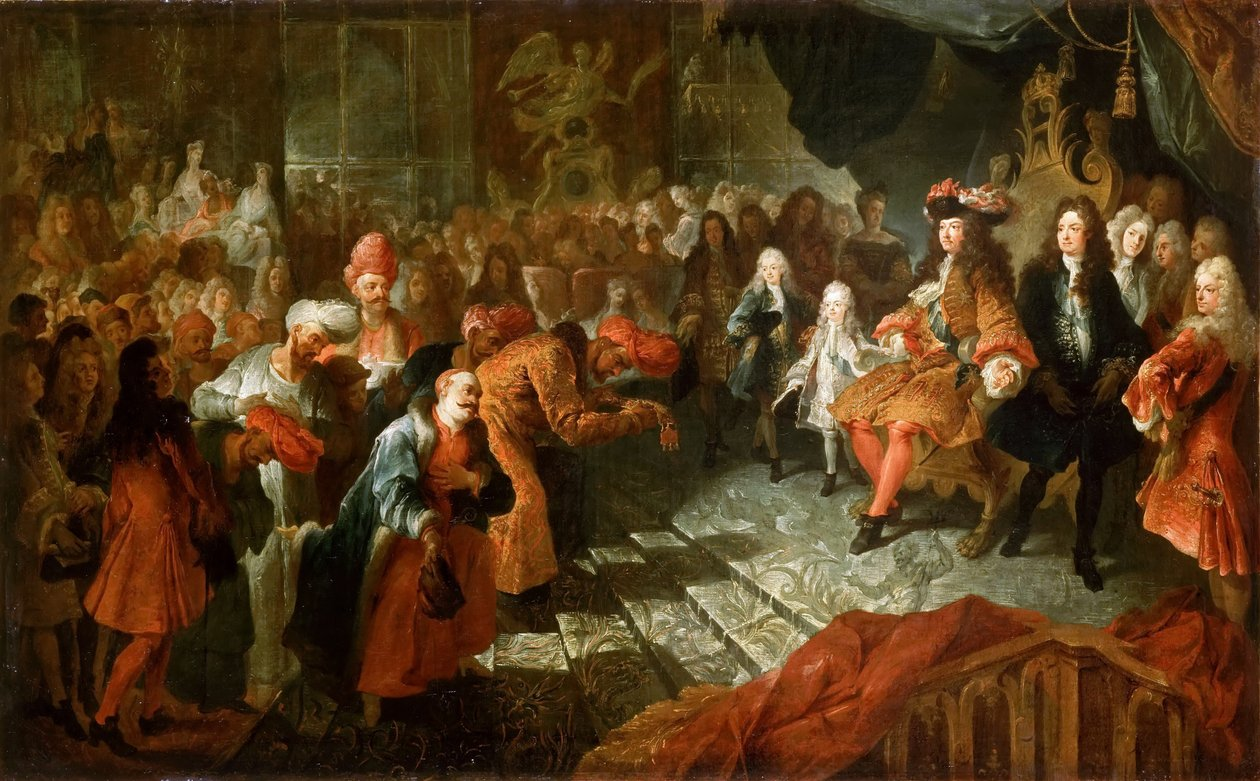
The Persian embassy to Louis XIV. Ambassade de Persie auprès de Louis XIV, studio of Antoine Coypel, c. 1715

Numerous trade contacts continued to occur between Persia (modern Iran) and France. In 1705, Louis XIV dispatched an Ambassador Extraordinary in the person of Jean-Baptiste Fabre, accompanied by a party including Jacques Rousseau, uncle of Jean-Jacques Rousseau, and a woman named Marie Petit, who owned a gaming house, probably also a brother, in Paris. Fabre died in Persia, but negotiations were taken over by Pierre-Victor Michel, leading to a largely ineffective signed in September 1708. Prior to that he had to sideline Marie Petit who, "in the name of the Princesses of France", tried to persuade the shah to recognize her as France's sole legitimate representative.

Wishing to reinforce exchanges, the Shah sent a Persian embassy to Louis XIV in 1715, led by Mohammad Reza Beg. The embassy visited king Louis XIV and obtained a new treaty of alliance signed in Versailles on 13 August 1715. Contact was then interrupted with the fall of the Safavid Empire in 1722 and the subsequent troubles, until the end of the century.

Impressed by the Persian visits, the French author Montesquieu wrote a fictional account about Persia, the Lettres persanes (English: "Persian Letters"), in 1721.

== Qajar Era ==
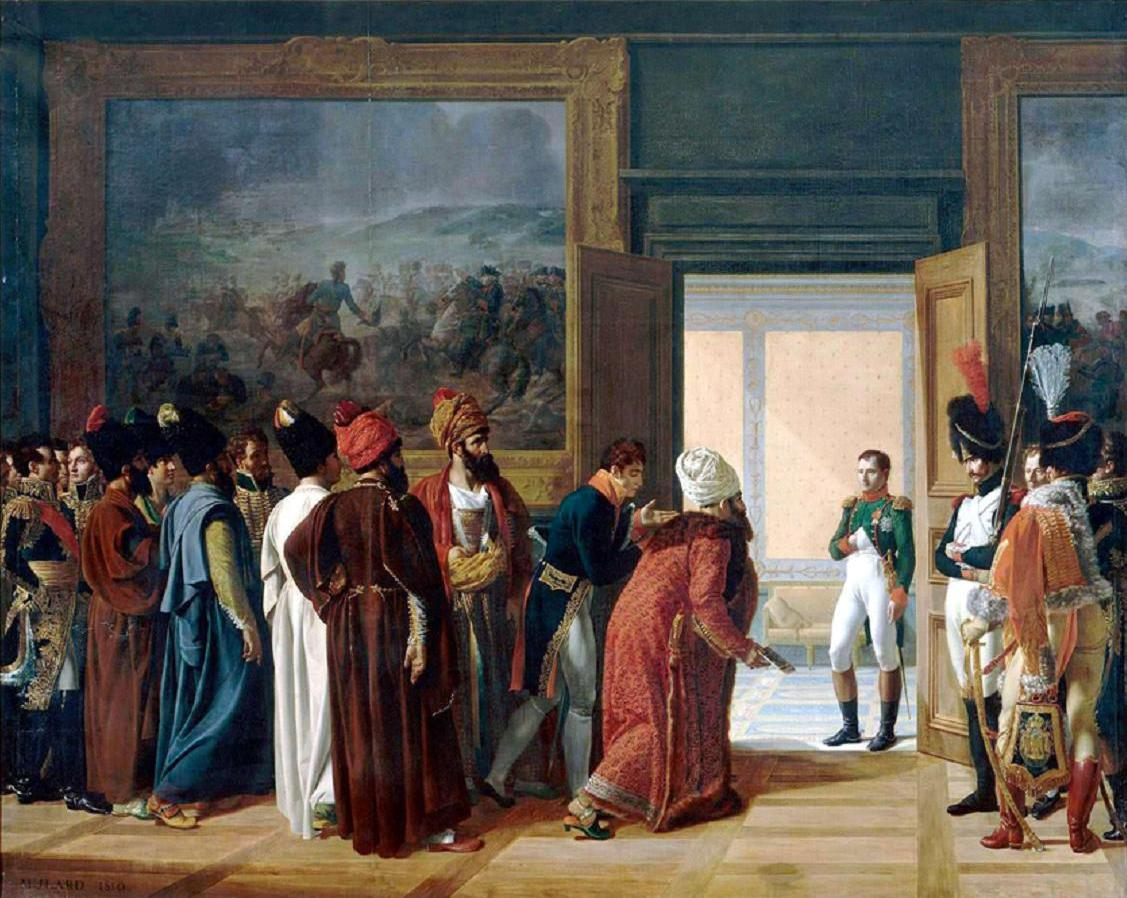
The Persian Envoy Mirza Mohammad-Reza Qazvini meeting with Napoleon I at the Finkenstein castle, 27 Avril 1807, by François Mulard.

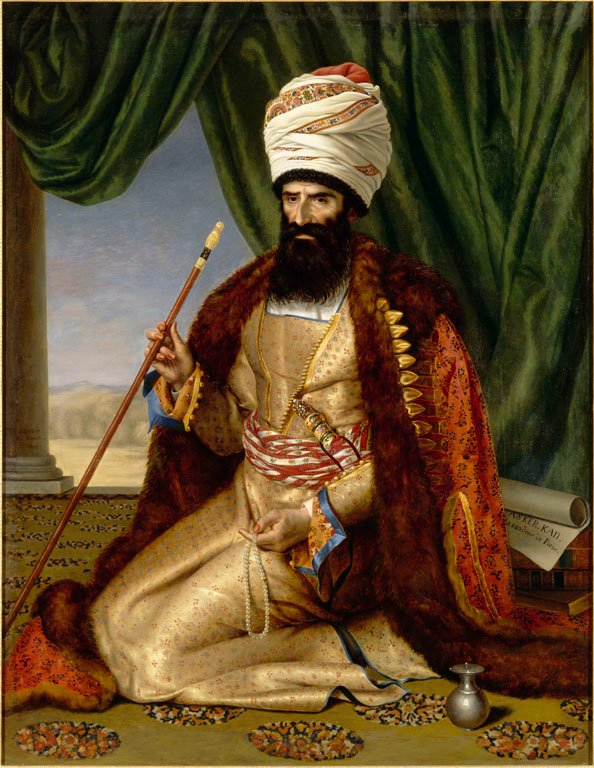
Persian ambassador Askar Khan Afshar, in Paris from July 1808 to April 1810, by Madame Vavin.

Attempts to resume contact were made following the French Revolution, as France was in conflict with Russia and wished to find an ally against that country. In 1796, two scientists, Jean-Guillaume Bruguières and Guillaume-Antoine Olivier, were sent to Persia by the Directoire, but were unsuccessful in obtaining an agreement.

A Franco-Persian alliance was formed for a short period between the French Empire of Napoleon I and the Persian Empire of Fath Ali Shah against Russia and Great Britain between 1807 and 1809. The alliance was part of Napoleon's plan to create another front on Russia's southern borders, as Iran and Russia were directly bordering each other there in the Caucasus region. Furthermore, the Iranian king was involved in a territorial dispute with the Russian tsar following its annexation of Georgia, which had been intermittently part of Iran since the mid 16th century. The alliance unravelled when France finally allied with Russia and turned its focus to European campaigns, and dropped its support during the Russo-Persian War (1804-1813), which eventually turned out into an Iranian defeat and huge irrevocable territorial losses, comprising modern-day Georgia, Dagestan, and most of the contemporary Republic of Azerbaijan.

Diplomatic relations with France resumed in 1839 following a dispute between Great Britain and Persia over the Iranian city of Herat. Great Britain would remove its military and diplomatic missions from Persia, occupy Kharg Island, and attack Bushehr. Mohammad Shah Qajar would in turn resume diplomatic relations with France, and send a diplomatic mission to Louis-Philippe under Mirza Hossein Khan to obtain military help. In response, a group of French officers was sent to Persia with the returning ambassador. The renewed French representation at the royal court resulted also in renewed missionary activity in Iran, primarily by the Lazarists, who opened hospitals, schools and orphanages.

== Pahlavi Era ==
Universal Newsreel about the Shah's visit to France in 1961

France had close economic collaboration with Iran during the Pahlavi era, especially with numerous contracts related to public works.

== Islamic Republic of Iran ==
=== Nuclear program ===
Following the 1979 Islamic Revolution, France refused to continue to provide Iran with enriched uranium, which it needed for its nuclear program. Tehran also did not get its investment back from the Eurodif joint stock company formed in 1973 by France, Belgium, Spain and Sweden. In 1975 Sweden's 10% share in Eurodif went to Iran as a result of an arrangement between France and Iran. The French government subsidiary company Cogéma and Tehran established the Sofidif (Société Franco–iranienne pour l’enrichissement de l’uranium par diffusion gazeuse) firm with 60% and 40% shares, respectively. In turn, Sofidif acquired a 25% share in EURODIF, which gave Iran its 10% share of Eurodif. Reza Shah Pahlavi lent 1 billion dollars (and another 180 million dollars in 1977) for the construction of the Eurodif factory, to have the right of buying 10% of the production of the site.

In 1982, president François Mitterrand, who had been elected the year before, refused to give any uranium to Iran, which also claimed the $1 billion debt. In 1986, Eurodif manager Georges Besse was assassinated; the act was allegedly claimed by left-wing militants from Action Directe. However, they denied any responsibility during their trial. In their investigation La République atomique, France-Iran le pacte nucléaire, David Carr-Brown and Dominique Lorentz pointed to the Iranian intelligence services' responsibility. They also claimed that the French hostage scandal was connected to the Iranian blackmail. Finally an agreement was reached in 1991: France refunded more than 1.6 billion dollars. Iran remained shareholder of Eurodif via Sofidif, a Franco-Iranian consortium shareholder to 25% of Eurodif. However, Iran refrained from asking for the produced uranium.

The International Atomic Energy Agency (IAEA) reported in February 2023 concerns over undeclared modifications at Iran's Fordow nuclear site, which enriches uranium to 60 percent, a step below weapons grade. This development is inconsistent with Iran's obligations under its Safeguards Agreement and undermines the IAEA's ability to implement effective safeguards measures.

=== Iran–Iraq War (1980–1988) ===
Furthermore, with the United States and other countries, France supported Saddam Hussein in the war against Iran (1980–1988). Saddam's air force included dozens of Dassault Mirage F1s, Dassault-Breguet Super Étendards, and Aérospatiale Gazelles, among other weaponry. Iraqi military purchases from France totaled $5.5 Billion in 1985, prompting U.S. Senator Ted Stevens of Alaska, and chairman of the U.S. Senate Appropriations Committee, to declare France's selling of military equipment to Iraq as "international treason".

The French were concerned that their support for Iraq would harm their relations with Iran, but their economic and commercial interests in Iraq were too important. The French military reinforced their naval presence in the Gulf in response to Iranian threats of deteriorating relations. France's history with Baghdad goes back decades. France was extremely popular in the Middle East after their public stance of neutrality in the Six-Day War. General de Gaulle invoked symbolic references of the cooperation between Charlemagne and the Abbasid Caliph Harun al-Rashid, promising Soviet-aligned Iraq with French cooperation at a time when Iraq was politically isolated from the West as a consequence of Cold War tensions. The French companies Berliet, Saviem and Panhard began selling military vehicles to the Iraqi army. Saddam Hussein visited France in 1972 to officially finalize the agreements of petroleum cooperation between the two countries following nationalization of the Iraqi oil industry. Hussein gave the French a list of weapons desired by the Iraqi military including radars, helicopters and fighter planes.

Paris and Baghdad grew closer and closer. By the end of the 1970s over 65 French companies were operating in Iraq. The Bouygues group had built underground shelters for the Iraqi army. They sold Iraq missiles and other war equipment. Relations with Iran were, on the other hand, primarily limited to cultural exchanges. France recognized the Shah as friendly overall, but condemned the regime's authoritarian streak. Tehran was considered firmly within the American and British sphere and Paris was less interested in Tehran then Baghdad because it could not sell French weapons to Iran. They did develop other commercial ties including for nuclear equipment and in 1974 the French government entered into an agreement to sell Iran nuclear power stations. The Shah gave France a one billion dollar loan for a 10% share in Eurodif allowing Iran to purchase 10% of the enriched uranium produced by the Tricastin plant.

France remained committed to the recognition of the Palestinian people's rights. When the Ayatollah Khomeini was expelled from Iran, the French government granted him political asylum, but later Khomeini returned to take power after the Islamic Revolution in 1979. The Islamic government withdrew from nuclear cooperation agreements with France and a dispute over the Eurodif partnership greatly damaged ties between the two nations. When François Mitterrand was elected in May 1981 he sent Hussein public messages of French support. Iraq was regarded as an example of secular, progressive and modernist values contrasted with Iran's conservatism. Claude Cheysson states that "Iraq is the only barrier to an Islamic onslaught that would destabilize the entire region and topple the moderate Arab regimes."

=== 2003 raid on the People's Mujahedin of Iran ===
In June 2003 French police raided the People's Mujahedin (PMOI)'s properties, including its base in Auvers-sur-Oise. 160 suspected MEK members were then arrested. French Interior Minister Nicolas Sarkozy (UMP) declared that the MEK "recently wanted to make France its support base, notably after the intervention in Iraq", while US Senator Sam Brownback, Republican of Kansas accused the French of doing "the Iranian government's dirty work". Along with other congressmen, he wrote a letter of protest to President Jacques Chirac, while longtime PMOI supporters such as Sheila Jackson-Lee, Democrat of Texas, criticized Maryam Radjavi's arrest. All charges were later dropped.

=== Other ===
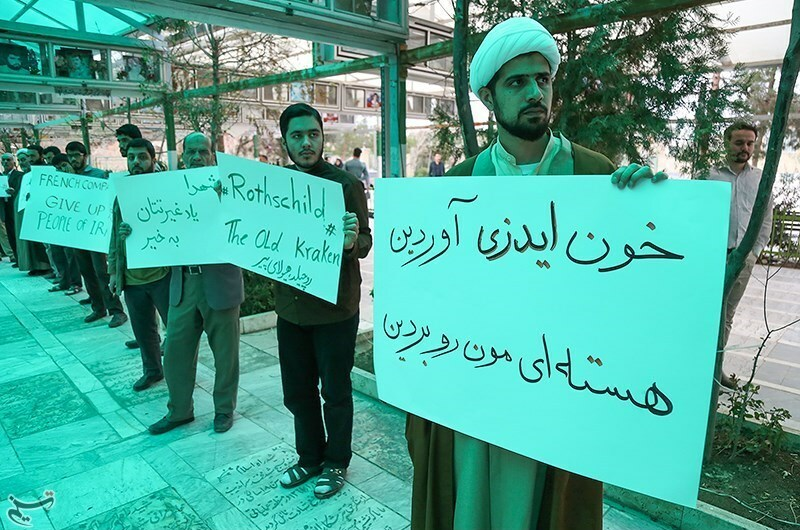
Students protesting Jean-Yves Le Drian travel to Iran, with a cleric holding up a banner with the phrase:You gave us AIDS polluted blood and taken our nuclear technology

In 2019, French-Iranian academic Fariba Adelkhah and French academic Roland Marchal were arrested on security charges. Marchal was later released in a prisoner swap. Adelkhah was sentenced in 2020 to five years on security charges and one year concurrently on charges of propaganda. According to France24, the case has been a "thorn in relations" between France and Iran. The academics' support committee has asked scientific institutions to "suspend all scientific co-operation with Iran". In May 2022, Iran's intelligence ministry said it had arrested two Europeans, later identified as French nationals, for allegedly fomenting "insecurity" in Iran. In October 2022, Iranian authorities announced more arrests in "the case of French spies", accusing those detained of "conspiracy and collusion" to harm Iran's national security.

In January 2023, French Special Forces seized a boat in the Gulf of Oman loaded with Iranian-supplied weapons and ammunition which were bound to militants in Yemen.

In 2025, the French government sued Iran at the International Court of Justice for holding their citizens hostage.

In 2026, Iran stated that de-mining of the Strait of Hormuz will be carried out solely by Iran in accordance with the Islamabad Memorandum between Tehran and Washington, following French President Emmanuel Macron's statement that France and Oman will cooperate with their partners to clear mines from the Hormuz and warned France not to complicate the situation further with its provocations.

In August 2026, Iran says it barred two French embassy employees from returning for allegedly violating the Vienna Convention through activities supporting Iranian civil society. France says their work involved programs for civil society, students, and artists.

== Economic relations ==
With 6.25% of the market share in exports to Iran, France was Iran's sixth-leading supplier in 2005. Iran is France's 27th customer (its third-leading customer in the Middle East). Fifty-five percent of French exports are concentrated in the automotive sector. French companies are also very active in the oil industry, rail and shipping transport, and the financial sector. For the most part, imports from Iran are crude oil. Altogether, 3% of French hydrocarbon imports come from Iran. A reciprocal agreement protecting and encouraging investment signed by the French Minister Delegate for Foreign Trade on 12 May 2003 in Tehran came into force on 13 November 2004. Iran's Minister of Commerce, Mr. Mohammad Shariat-Madari, made an official visit to France from 20 through 23 January 2004. The French Secretary of State for Transport and the Sea, Mr. François Goulard, went to Iran on 20 June 2004, on the occasion of the resumption of Air France's Paris-Tehran flights. The nuclear issue will determine any changes in the business climate in Iran. France and its European partners have emphasized to Iran the promising prospects that would result from a negotiated solution. However, the present worsening of the nuclear crisis could damage France's economic cooperation with Iran in the long run.

IKCO cooperation with France's Peugeot dates back to more than two decades ago and seven different Peugeot models accounted for about 64 percent of the total of 542,000 passenger cars and pickups produced by IKCO in 2007. IKCO and Iran's second-largest car company, Saipa, produce Logan in a joint venture with France's Renault.

France's imports from Iran in the first nine months of 2016 showed a 34-fold rise compared to the corresponding period in 2015, Iran's state-run Tasnim News Agency reported on 10 December 2016.

== Diplomatic relations ==
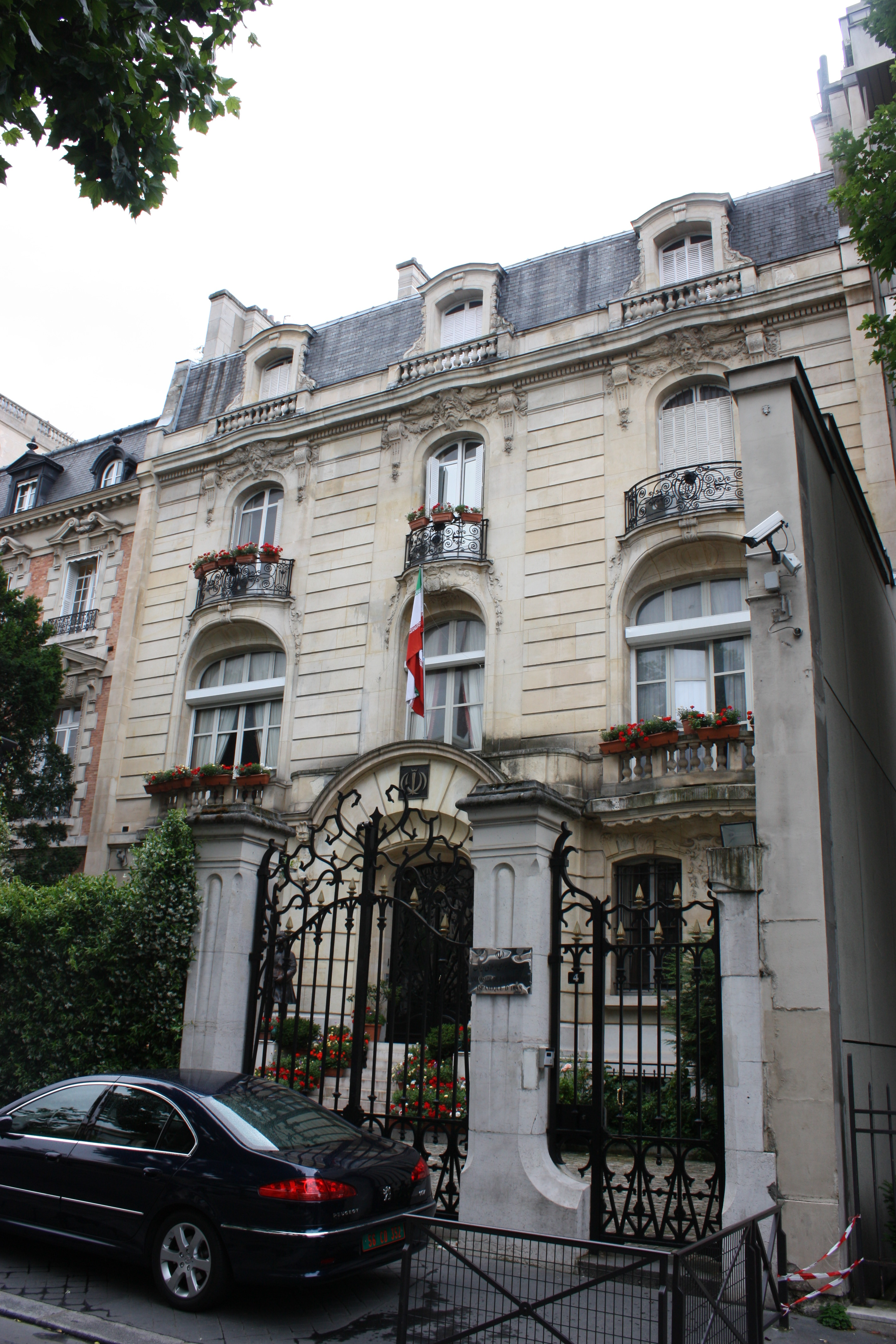
Embassy of Iran in Paris

The most recent bilateral visits of political leaders occurred during the first half of 2005:

- President Khatami met with the French President in Paris on 5 April 2005, on the sidelines of a conference at UNESCO, where he gave an address on the dialogue between civilizations. The Minister received his Iranian counterpart, Mr. Kamal Kharazi, who was accompanying the Iranian President.
- Mr. Xavier Darcos, the Minister Delegate for Cooperation, Development and Francophony, went to Tehran and Bam on 22–23 May 2005.

The declarations made by the Iranian President promoting the destruction of Israel and negating the Nazi genocide have been strongly condemned by the French President. Iran's ambassador was summoned to the Ministry of Foreign Affairs on 27 October 2005 regarding this matter. The French government has expressed its concerns to the Iranian government about the human rights situation in Iran. On 12 December 2005, the Prime Minister awarded the French Human Rights Prize to the wife of Emadeddin Baqi, an Iranian dissident who fights for prisoners’ rights and against the death penalty in Iran. In the context of its policy supporting defenders of human rights, the Ministry of Foreign Affairs summoned the Iranian chargé d'affaires to Paris in August 2005 to express its concerns regarding the fate of journalist, Akbar Gandji, and his lawyer, Mr. Soltani (who was awarded the French Human Rights Prize in December 2003 on behalf of the Human Rights Defence Centre, of which Ms. Shirin Ebadi, Nobel Peace Prize Laureate, is the President).

Iran's ambassador in Paris, Mr. Sadegh Kharazi, ceased to hold office on 22 November 2005. His successor Ali Ahani is currently the new ambassador under President Ahmadinejad and thereafter.

The Franco-Iranian relation has cooled off in recent years. Some leaders of MKO were admitted to France and they have actively campaigned against the Islamic regime. Since election of President Ahmadinejad in 2005, the relation has become more contentious. In January 2007, Jacques Chirac warned in an interview that "if Iran were to launch a nuclear weapon against a country like Israel, it would lead to the immediate destruction of Tehran", but he quickly retracted his comments. In 2009 Ahmadinejad's re-election, France supported the opposition candidates, who lost the election. The Iranian movie maker Mohsen Makhmalbaf resided in France during the run-off to the elections in 2009 and was spreading anti-government propaganda and promoting the Green velvet revolution. Also, Iran accused the French embassy for having a role in instigating post election protest via its embassy personnel in Tehran.

In late August 2010, Iran's state-run daily paper Kayhan called France's first lady Carla Bruni-Sarkozy a 'prostitute' after she had condemned the stoning sentence against Sakineh Mohammadi Ashtiani for adultery in an open letter, along with several French celebrities. The paper later also called for Bruni to be put to death for supporting Sakineh Ashtiani, and for what the paper described as Bruni's moral corruption and having had extra-marital affairs herself. Even though Kayhan is a state-sponsored paper and it continued its tirade against Bruni along with other state-run Iranian media, Iranian officials tried to distance themselves from that violent stance, while a spokesman for the French Foreign Ministry criticized the comments as being 'unacceptable'. The incident rapidly found its way into the Iranian domestic politics.

On 10 April 2019, Iran's president, Hassan Rouhani held a telephone conversation with French President Emmanuel Macron, discussing about how the labeling of Iran's Islamic Revolutionary Guards Corps (IRGC) as a terrorist organization in the United States Department of State list of Foreign Terrorist Organizations served as a very provocative action taken against Iran.

On May 12, 2022, France summoned a senior Iranian envoy after two of its citizens were imprisoned in Tehran in an arbitrary detention, according to the French government.

On July 15, 2022, the French foreign ministry announced that France had requested Iran to free three filmmakers who were detained earlier that month.

In a phone call with Masoud Pezeshkian on 29 July 2024, Macron cautioned Iran against its ongoing support for Russia's war in Ukraine. Macron expressed that Iran had a responsibility to help prevent the escalation of tensions between Lebanon and Israel by ceasing its support for destabilizing actors. Additionally, he urged Iran to halt the concerning escalation of its nuclear program and to comply with international organizations. Macron also emphasized that the release of three French hostages would be essential for improving Franco-Iranian relations.

On January 7, 2025, the French government asked its citizens not to travel to Iran, until its citizens detained by the Iranian government and are held as "hostages" are released.

== Cultural, scientific and technical relations ==
Cooperation relations are managed in the context of the general arrangement of 14 September 1993 and the cultural arrangement of 31 January 1999. Four priorities have been established:

- The promotion of inter-university partnerships and advanced French training. France is the sixth-leading country in terms of hosting Iranian scholars. Actions supporting university cooperation conducted by the embassy in Tehran (welcoming and guiding students, improving language skills, providing networking opportunities with former scholars) are to be grouped together in a centre for university information and exchange.
- Increased French instruction in Iran's secondary and higher education. Several public secondary schools in Iran offered French classes in Autumn 2003.
- Borrowed words from French, and language similarities due to both being Indo-European languages.
- The promotion of scientific partnerships (seismology, biology, environmental sciences, town planning, human and social sciences, veterinary medicine) in compliance with the rules of vigilance and with Iranian co-financing. A two-year integrated action programme (called “Gundishapur”) ended in July 2004.
- Bidirectional development in cultural dialogue. The embassy provides volunteer translation and publication services and organizes cultural and scientific events. The French Research Institute in Iran is the only foreign research centre authorized to take part in disseminating information about Iranian culture.

== Polls ==
According to a 2012 BBC World Service poll, only 7% of French people viewed Iran's influence positively, with 82% expressing a negative view. According to a 2012 Pew Global Attitudes Survey, 14% of French people viewed Iran favorably, compared to 86% who viewed it unfavorably; 96% of French people opposed Iranian acquisition of nuclear weapons and 74% approved of "tougher sanctions" on Iran, while 51% supported use of military force to prevent Iran from developing nuclear weapons.

== Resident diplomatic missions ==
- France has an embassy in Tehran.
- Iran has an embassy in Paris.

== See also ==
- Foreign relations of France
- Foreign relations of Iran
- 2011–12 Strait of Hormuz dispute
- Iranians in France
- Iran–European Union relations
- Joseph Labrosse (Carmelite)
- 2024 Iranian operations inside Australia
