= Maryam Kalali =

Iranian aristocrat (1914–2005)

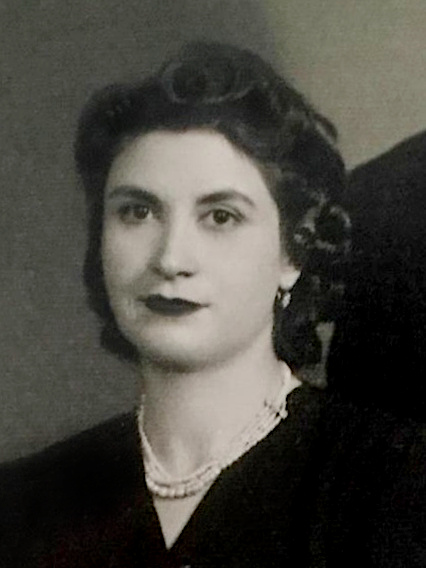
- Kalali in 1936
- Born: 25 October 1914; Tehran, Sublime State of Iran
- Died: 4 October 2005 (aged 90)
- Spouse: Etemad Shahabi
- Parents: Showkat ed-Dowleh (father); Nosrat Saltaneh (mother)
- Relatives: Amirteymour Kalali, Nahid Mirza, Aga Khan IV

Maryam Shahabi (Persian: مریم کلالی; 25 October 1914 – 4 October 2005) was an Iranian aristocrat and landowner.

== Early life ==
Shahabi took interest in the arts from an early age, practicing the piano, horseback riding, and learning three languages. She was also the first woman in Iran to obtain a driving's license.

== White Revolution ==
During Mohammad Reza Pahlavi's White Revolution, Shahabi owned large land holdings in Iran. She was one of the first female landowners to voluntarily distribute a portion of her land holdings.

== Lineage ==
A member of one of Iran's oldest royal dynasties, Shahabi was the granddaughter of Prince Mir 'Ali Mardan Khan, Nuzrat ol-Molk.

== Private life ==
She married Etemad Shahabi, and together they had four children:

- Helene Shahabi, married Bozorgmehr Sadr and had children:
  - Hedieh Sadr
  - Ramin Sadr
- Khosrow Shahabi, married Roya Akhavan and had children:
  - Maryam Shahabi
  - Teymour Shahabi
  - Cyrus Shahabi
- Nosrat Shahabi, married Ali-Naghi Farmanfarmaian and had children:
  - Fati Farman-Farmaian
  - Abdol Hamid Farman-Farmaian
  - Abou Farman-Farmaian
- Mahnaz Shahabi, married Essy Tayebi and had children:
  - Amirali Tayebi
  - Amirreza Tayebi
