= Government of the classical Ottoman Empire =

Overview of the Ottoman Empire's governmental and societal structure

The Ottoman Empire developed over the years as a despotism with the Sultan as the supreme ruler of a centralized government that had an effective control of its provinces, officials and inhabitants. Wealth and rank could be inherited but were just as often earned. Positions were perceived as titles, such as viziers and aghas. Military service was a key to many problems.

The expansion of the Empire called for a systematic administrative organization that developed into a dual system of military ("Central Government") and civil administration ("Provincial System") and developed a kind of separation of powers: higher executive functions were carried out by the military authorities and judicial and basic administration were carried out by civil authorities. Outside this system were various types of vassal and tributary states. Most of the areas ruled by the Ottomans were explicitly mentioned in the official full style of the sultan, including various lofty titles adopted to emphasize imperial rank and show the empire as being "successor-in-law" to conquered states.

The empire was divided into vilayets, with a governor assigned to each vilayet. The idea of vilayet originated from the Seljuk vassal state (Uç Beyliği) in central Anatolia. Over the years the Empire became an amalgamation of pre-existing polities, the Anatolian beyliks, brought under the sway of the ruling House of Osman.

== Central government ==
The central government was composed of the Sultan and his own staff (bookkeepers, etc.) in what was known as "House of Osman". The House of Osman was advised by the Divan, composed of the Grand Vizier and the ruling class (nobles). The ruling class was called the askeri, including the noblemen, court officials, military officers and the religious class called the ulema.

=== House of Osman ===
The Ottoman dynasty or House of Osman (c. 1280–1922) was unprecedented and unequaled in the Islamic world for its size and duration. The Ottoman sultan, pâdişâh or "lord of kings", served as the empire's sole regent and was considered to be the embodiment of its government, though he did not always exercise complete control. The Ottoman family was originally Turkish in its ethnicity, as were its subjects; however the kingship quickly acquired many different ethnicities through intermarriage with slaves and European nobility.

Throughout Ottoman history, however – despite the supreme de jure authority of the sultans and the occasional exercise of de facto authority by Grand Viziers – there were many instances in which local governors acted independently, and even in opposition to the ruler. On eleven occasions, the sultan was deposed because he was perceived by his enemies as a threat to the state. There were only two attempts in the whole of Ottoman history to unseat the ruling Osmanlı dynasty, both failures, which is suggestive of a political system which for an extended period was able to manage its revolutions without unnecessary instability.

After the dissolution of the empire, the new republic abolished the Sultanate and Caliphate and declared the members of the House of Osman as personae non gratae of Turkey. Fifty years later, in 1974, the Grand National Assembly of Turkey granted descendants of the former dynasty the right to acquire Turkish citizenship. The current head of the House of Osman is Harun Osman.

==== Imperial Harem ====
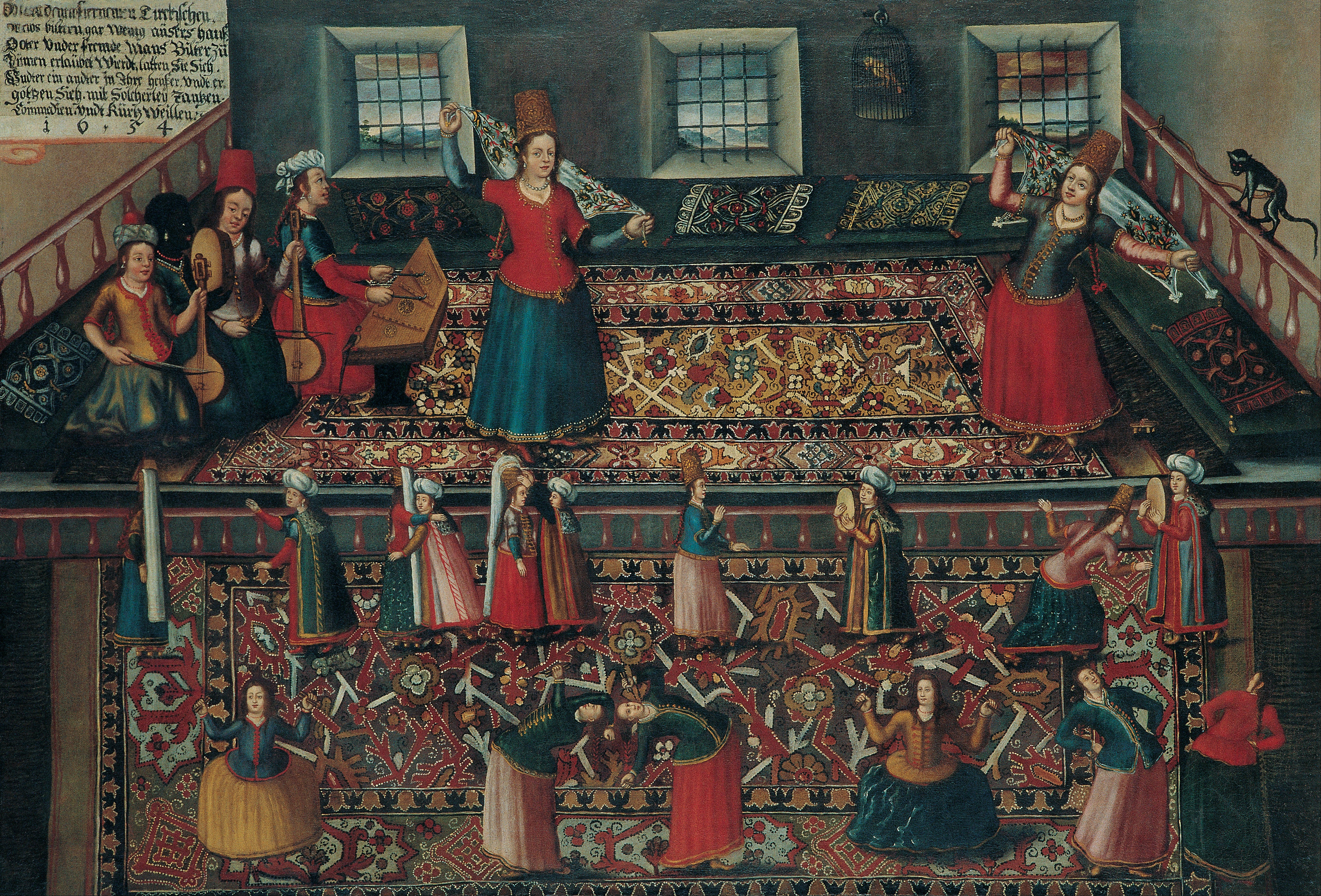
Harem of Topkapı Palace

The Harem was one of the most important powers of the Ottoman court. It was ruled by the Valide sultan (Sultana Mother), mother of the reigning sultan, who held supreme power over the Harem and thus a powerful position in the court. On occasion, the Valide Sultan would become involved in state politics and through her influence could diminish the power and position of the sultan. For a period of time beginning in the 16th century and extending into the 17th, the women of the Harem effectively controlled the state in what was termed the "Sultanate of Women" (Kadınlar Saltanatı).

The harem had its own internal organization and order of formulating policies. Beneath the Valide Sultan in the hierarchy was the Haseki Sultan, chief consort of the sultan, who had the chance of becoming the next Valide Sultan when her son ascended to the throne. This position existed around the 16th and 17th centuries. The sultan also had four other official consorts, who were each called Kadın. Next in rank below the sultan's wives were his eight favourite concubines (ikbâls or hâs odalıks), and then the other concubines whom the sultan favoured and who were termed gözde. Next in rank were the concubines of other court officials. Pupils (acemî) and novices (câriye or şâhgird) were younger women who were either waiting to be married off to someone or who had not yet graduated out of the Harem School.

==== Palace schools ====
The Palace schools comprised not a single track, but two. First, the Madrasa (Ottoman Turkish: Medrese) for the Muslims, which educated the scholars and the state officials in accordance with Islamic tradition. The financial burden of the Medrese was supported by vakifs, allowing children of poor families to move to higher social levels and income. The second track, the Enderun School, was a boarding school for converted Christians, which conscripted 3,000 students annually from Christian boys between 8 and 20 years old from about one in forty families among the communities settled in Rumelia and/or the Balkans; a process known as Devşirme. Orphans, single children, married boys, Jews, Russians, and craftsmen's and shepherd's sons were exempted.

The Palace Schools were fairly successful in this trans-culturation of students, and many statesmen were products of this process. The system functioned strictly for government purposes, and (ideally) the graduates were permanently devoted to government service and had no interest in forming relations with lower social groups.

The incoming students were called the inner boys (Ottoman Turkish: iç oğlanlar). It took seven years of professional development to graduate. The apprenticeship began in the Sultan's services; progressing to mastering natural and Islamic sciences (formal education); and finally to developing physical fitnesses, and vocational or artistic skills. It is reported by Madeline Zilfi that European visitors of the time commented "In making appointments, Sultan pays no regard to any pretensions on the score of wealth or rank. It is by merits that man rise..Among the Turks, honours, high posts and Judgeships are rewards of great ability and good service."

=== The Divan ===
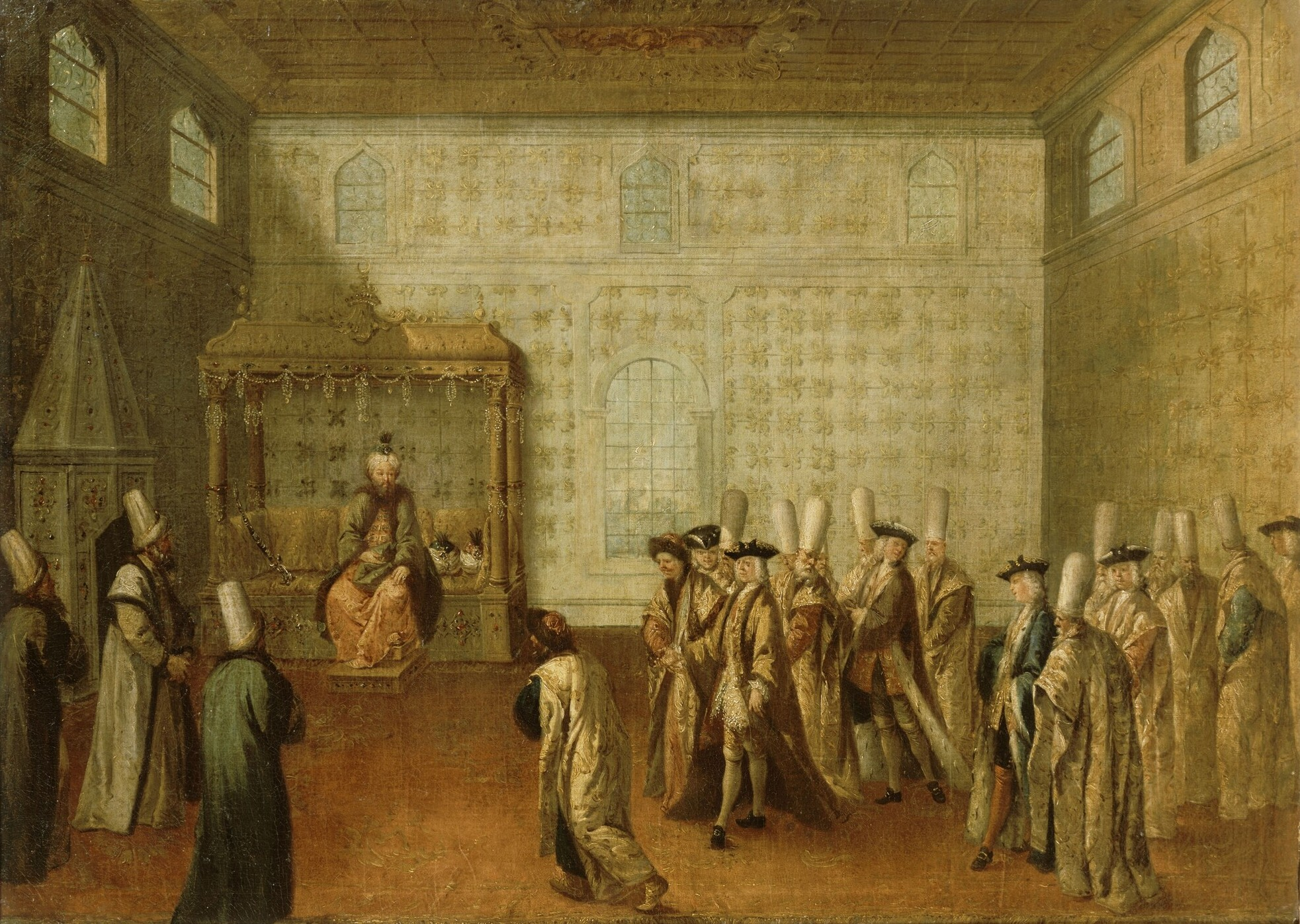
Mustafa II receiving the French embassy of Charles de Ferriol in 1699; painting by Jean-Baptiste van Mour

Though the sultan was the "sublime monarch", he had a number of advisors and ministers. The most powerful of these were the viziers of the Divan or Imperial Council, led by the Grand Vizier. The Divan was a council where the viziers met and debated the politics of the empire. It was the Grand Vizier's duty to inform the sultan of the opinion of the Divan. The sultan often took his vizier's advice into consideration, but he by no means had to obey the Divan. Sometimes the sultan called a Divan meeting himself if he had something important to inform his viziers of, such as imminent war. The viziers then carried out his orders. The Divan consisted of three viziers in the 14th century and eleven in the 17th century; four of them served as Viziers of the Dome, the most important ministers next to the Grand Vizier. Sometimes the commander (ağa) of the Janissaries attended the Divan meetings as well.

Mehmed II conquered Constantinople in (1453) and established his court there. The Sultan presided in person over the Council of State – called Divan, after the seat he sat on, until an incident arose (so it is related) when a ragged Turcoman blundered into a meeting of the Divan and demanded "Well, which of you is the happy Emperor ?". Mehmed was incensed and the Grand Vizier suggested he sit above the fray. Consequently, a latticed bay was constructed "The eye of the Sultan", enabling Mehmed to look down unseen.

== Provincial governance (civil administration) ==
Townspeople, villagers and farmers formed a lower class called the rayah. Both in contemporaneous and in modern usage, it refers to non-Muslim subjects in particular, also called zimmi.

Civil and judicial administration was carried out under a separate parallel system of small municipal or rural units called kazas administered by a qadi (kadı). Kazas in turn were subdivided into nahiyas. The qadis came from the ulema and represent the legal authority of the sultan. The civil system was considered a check on the military system since beys (who represented executive authority) could not carry out punishment without the sentence of a qadi. Likewise, qadis were not permitted to personally effect punishment. In the areas of sharia and kanun law, qadis were responsible directly to the sultan.

== Vassal states ==
The Ottoman Empire had many vassal states of varying size attached to it. Vassals paid taxes to the sultan and often contributed with troops in various Ottoman military campaigns. Many of the imperial provinces were vassal states before being reduced to provinces. A vassal state that never became a province was the Khanate of Crimea in the region around Crimea, north of Black Sea – it would fall to Russia instead (1783; later in modern Ukraine).

- A special case was the Greek orthodox 'monastic republic' of Mount Athos, where Constantinople was only represented by an aga (officer) as its agent in Karyaes.
- As the empire weakened militarily, it would inevitably lose control through foreign victories (Russia took large chunks of territory and helped parts of the Balkans secede, often after a vassalic stage, such as the hospodars) but also see real control over some of its (mainly remote) provinces slip away to a state of little more than formal sovereignty over tributary, de facto autonomous states.

The latter happened in North Africa: the Beys/Deys of Tunis and Algiers established themselves as 'regencies' and even Egypt went its own way under its great khedive Mohammed Ali – they would in turn be subjected to European colonial dominance, as protectorates, of France and Britain.

== See also ==
- Government of the late Ottoman Empire
