= Iranians in France =

French Iranians ایرانیان فرانسه
Total population
- 65,000 (Persians only)

Languages
- French, Persian (also Azerbaijani, Kurdish, Armenian, and others)

Religion
- Shia Islam, Sunni Islam, Irreligious, Minority: Christianity, Zoroastrianism

Related ethnic groups
- Iranian peoples, Iranian Azerbaijanis, Iranian Armenians, Armenians in France

Iranians in France include immigrants from Iran to France as well as their descendants of Iranian heritage or background. Iranians in France are referred to by hyphenated terms such as French-Iranians or French-Persians.

== Terminology ==
French-Iranian is used interchangeably with French-Persian, partly due to the fact that, in the Western world, Iran was known as "Persia". On the Nowruz of 1935, Reza Shah Pahlavi asked foreign delegates to use the term Iran, the endonym of the country used since the Sasanian Empire, in formal correspondence. Since then, usage of the term "Iran" has become more common in Western countries. Therefore, the term used to refer to citizens of Iran changed from "Persian" to "Iranian". In 1959, the government of Mohammad Reza Shah Pahlavi, Reza Shah Pahlavi's son, announced that both "Persia" and "Iran" could officially be used interchangeably. However the issue is still debated today.

There is a tendency among French-Iranians to categorize themselves as "Persian" rather than "Iranian", mainly to dissociate themselves from the Islamic regime of Iran which has been in charge since the 1979 Revolution and the negativity associated with it, and also to distinguish themselves as being of Persian ethnicity, which comprise about 65% of Iran's population. While the majority of British-Iranians come from Persian backgrounds, there is a significant number of non-Persian Iranians such as Azerbaijanis and Kurds within the British-Iranian community, leading some scholars to believe that the label "Iranian" is more inclusive, since the label "Persian" excludes non-Persian minorities. The Collins English Dictionary uses a variety of similar and overlapping definitions for the terms "Persian" and "Iranian".

== History ==
=== Early history ===
Iranians from within the modern-day or previous borders of disestablished Iranian states have a relatively long history in France. Jean Althen (Hovhannès Althounian), a Persian-Armenian agronomist from Nakhchivan, is known to have introduced madder to southern France in the 1750s. A statue of him was erected in Avignon expressing the city's gratitude for him. The emergence of a genuine Iranian community in France can perhaps be traced back to 1855-6, when Farrokh Khan Ḡaffārī, Amīn-ol-Molk, later Amīn-ol-Dawleh was sent to Paris as the shah's envoy. During his embassy, a group of forty-two Persian students, who became known as les enfants de Perse (Thieury, p. 39) and who were chosen mostly from the graduates of the recently founded Dar ol-fonūn, were sent to France. Meanwhile, in the course of the latter part of the 19th century, the Persian upper classes gradually began to send their sons to Europe and especially to France to pursue higher studies.

=== Early 20th century ===
France was a popular destination for Persian (Iranian) international students in the early 20th century. The first government-sponsored Persian students, a group of 20, all went to France in 1926. In 1932, the Pahlavi government drew up a competitive examination to determine the distribution of government scholarships to aspiring international students; 110 out of the 125 students who passed the examination went to France, making them the overwhelming majority of all Persian students abroad. Another 66 chose France as their destination the following year. Aside from government-sponsored students, there were also 537 privately financed Persian students living in France in 1934, nearly half of the total 1,165 privately financed international students. However, in 1938, a governmental decree prohibited students from going abroad on private funds to pursue degrees. The Iranian students in France lived in dormitories on their school campuses, unlike Iranian students in Germany who rented private accommodations by themselves; this meant that they were often subject to surveillance by officials from the Iranian embassy, and prevented the growth of anti-Pahlavi activism among them. Germany, rather than France, would thus become the major European centre of Iranian dissent in the 1930s.

Notable Iranians who studied in France include Mehdi Bazargan, the first Iranian to pass the entrance examination to any of the grandes écoles; he went on to become prime minister of Iran after the 1979 Iranian Revolution.

== After the Iranian Revolution ==
Today, Iranians in France consist primarily of "political emigrants", who left Iran immediately after the revolution, because their association with communists, monarchists, or other opposition groups put them in danger, and "socio-cultural emigrants"—especially women and youths—who had little political affiliation but left Iran more slowly in the years following the revolution due to despair over the future of Iranian society. France expelled some of the political migrants, including Massoud Rajavi and his People's Mojahedin of Iran, in an effort to improve relations with Iran and secure the release of French hostages held by pro-Iranian forces in Lebanon.

Iranians in France:
Year	1975	1980	1990	2003	2004	2006	2009
Persons	3,300	13,193	15,209	11,609	10,974	~15,000	

== Notable people ==
- Kyan Khojandi, comedian and actor
- Alireza Firouzja, chess grandmaster and the youngest chess player to have surpassed a 2800 FIDE rating.
- Anicée Alvina, singer and actress
- Babak Amir-Tahmasseb, world champion kayaker
- Barbara Pravi, singer, songwriter and actress (nationality is French, but her maternal grandfather, Hossein Zenderoudi, is Iranian)
- Golshifteh Farahani, actress and musician
- Soheil Ayari, race car driver
- Sarah Kazemy, actress
- Mansour Bahrami, professional tennis player and entertainer
- Heydar Ghiai, architect
- Mahmoud Khayami, founder of Iran Khodro
- Darius Khondji, cinematographer
- Mehran Karimi Nasseri, famous refugee
- Tristane Banon, journalist and writer.
- Soraya Esfandiary-Bakhtiari, former Queen of Iran, actress
- Shapour Bakhtiar, political scientist, writer and the last Prime Minister of Iran under king Mohammad Reza Pahlavi
- Pierre Omidyar, founder of eBay
- Bahram Aryana, former military commander under Mohammad Reza Pahlavi
- Patrick Ali Pahlavi, member of the Pahlavi dynasty
- Aravane Rezaï, professional tennis player
- Philippe Khorsand, actor
- Mahyar Monshipour, boxer
- Djahanguir Riahi, French furniture collector
- Marjane Satrapi, graphic novelist
- Abbas Gharabaghi, the last chief of staff of the Iranian armed forces as well as deputy commander-In-chief of the Iranian Imperial Army during the rule of the Pahlavi dynasty.
- Abolhassan Banisadr, politician, economist and human rights activist

== See also ==
- France–Iran relations
- Iranian diaspora
- Immigration to France
- Asian diasporas in France
