= Tzelepides =

The Tzelepides were officials of the Ottoman state who collected the tzelepiko tax (resm-iagnam-Icelebkeşan) on large scale livestock breeders.

The Ottoman government created this tax to help cover its needs in certain livestock products. Its payment in kind and its collection exclusively by the state led to the establishment of a special mechanism for its administration. The tax collectors were called "tzelepides" (celep). The need for a flexible state agency, that will oversee the supply and prompt delivery of the required animals for consumption, gradually involves the livestock breeding populations in the mechanism for the collection of the tax. Through this process they are turned into one of the empire's productive forces, while the capacity of a tzelepis is slowly identified with livestock owners who have undertaken the task to supply the state with livestock products. This upgraded relationship with the state provides them with the privilege to access or intervene in the state mechanisms, which in turn maintains or even instigates their pursuitof a stronger economic presence. This is realized when livestock breeding develops into a broader commercial activity. This way these “state sheepherders” sell part of their production on the free market, thus achieving greater profits and greater economic power.

== Sources ==
- Β.Cvetkova, «Les Celep et leur rôle dansla vie économique des Balkans à l'époque Ottomane (XVe-XVIIe s.)», M. A. Cook, Studiesin the Economic History of the Middle East, from the rise of Islam to the present day, Oxford 1970, pp. 172–192.
- B. Cvetkova, «Le service des "celep" et le ravitaillement en bétail dans l'Empire Ottoman (XVe-XVIIIe s.)», Études Historiques 3 (Sofia, 1966), pp. 145–150
- V. Moutavcieva, Agrotikes scheseis stin othomaniki autokratoria (15–16 c.) [Agrarian Institutions in the Ottoman Empire (17th and 18th centuries)], transl. O. Astrinaki – E. Mpalta, Publ. Poreia, Athens 1990, pp. 274 note 205.
- V. Rokou, Oreines koinonies kata tin periodo ths Othomanikis kiriarchias sta Valkania [Mountain communities during the time of the Ottoman rule in the Balkans], publ. Erodios, Thessaloniki 2007, pp. 81–106.
