= Ashraf os-Soltaneh Qajar =

Iranian princess (19th century)

Ashraf os-Soltaneh (Persian: اشرف‌السلطانه قاجار) was a princess of the Qajar dynasty of Iran. She was the daughter of Mohammad Taqi Mirza Rokn ed-Dowleh, son of Mohammad Shah Qajar (r. 1834–1848).

Princess Ashraf married the Timurid prince Nuzrat ol-Molk (1830–1897).
