= Consulate-General of France, Tabriz =

The Consulate General of France in Tabriz
- Location: Passage Alley, Tabriz, Iran
- Opening: 1866
- Closed: 1969

The Consulate General of France in Tabriz was a French diplomatic mission based in Tabriz, a major city in northwestern Iran that was established in 1866. This consulate general was located in Passage Alley, within the historic Miarmiar district of Tabriz. The consulate was active from 1866 to 1969, with a temporary closure between 1946 and 1952. It played a significant role in political, commercial, and cultural events of the region.

== History ==
Amid the rivalry among European empires—particularly Russia and Britain—for influence in Iran, France decided to establish official consulates in key locations such as Tabriz, following the signing of the 1855 treaty with Iran. The French consulate in Tabriz was established in 1866 and became recognized as a central diplomatic institution in northern Iran. Located in the heart of Tabriz—an important city with notable commercial and political significance, especially due to its strategic position connecting Iran to the Caucasus and the Ottoman Empire—the consulate played a prominent role in regional diplomacy. According to the Encyclopædia Iranica, other European powers, including Russia, Britain, and the Ottoman Empire, also established their consulates in Miar Miar, a district of Tabriz with a significant Armenian population.

== See also ==
- France–Iran relations
- List of diplomatic missions of France
