= Nahid Mirza =

Iranian-Pakistani socialite (1919–2019)

- ناهید میرزا
- Born: Nahid Amirteymour; 6 February 1919; Tehran, Qajar Persia
- Died: 23 January 2019 (aged 99); London, United Kingdom
- Citizenship: United Kingdom; Iran; Pakistan
- Known for: First Lady of Pakistan
- Spouses: Afghamy (div. 1953); Iskandar Mirza (m. 1954, death)
- Father: Amirteymour Kalali
- Relatives: Timurid dynasty (paternal); Nawabs of Murshidabad (paternal in-laws); Tyabji family (maternal in-laws)

Nahid Iskander Mirza (6 February 1919 – 23 January 2019), born Nahid Amirteymour (previously Nahid Afghamy), was a British-Iranian noblewoman who became the first First Lady of Pakistan from 1956 to 1958.

She was also a close personal friend of Queen Soraya Esfandiary-Bakhtiary and Ava Gardner. In addition, alongside her husband, President Iskander Mirza, she played a pivotal role in inaugurating Aga Khan IV's imamat in 1957, marking a momentous chapter in history.

== First Lady of Pakistan ==
As First Lady, Nahid Mirza accompanied her husband, President Iskander Mirza, on official visits to Iran, Turkey, Spain, and Portugal, while also hosting Russian and Chinese leaders in Pakistan. She established a trust for blind children, created special centers, and played a major role in the establishment of the first state-level orphanage, Kashana.

== Personal life ==
Nahid was the daughter of Amirteymour Kalali, and the granddaughter of Prince Mir 'Ali Mardan Shah, Nuzrat ol-Molk and his wife Ashraf us-Sultana Qajar.

Nahid was first married to an Iranian Lieutenant Colonel Afghamy, a then military-attaché at the Iranian Embassy in Pakistan. At the same time, Iskander Mirza was the secretary of the Defense Ministry in Pakistan. During an event at the Russian embassy in Karachi, she met Iskandar Mirza for the first time. In 1952, the Afghamys left Pakistan for Tehran again. And Nahid joined her daughter in London, who at the time was to enter a boarding school in the town. In December 1953 she divorced Afghamy and in September 1954 she married Mirza who had lost his wife and son in a plane crash.

According to Pakistan Today, she played a major role in the resolution of the border dispute between Pakistan and Iran about Mirjaveh.

Following the military coup in Pakistan in 1958, the Mirzas were exiled to London where they lived at South Kensington. Iskander died in November 1969. After Mirza's death, Nahid Mirza spent nearly 50 years longing for the love letters he had written to her before their marriage. Despite efforts to retrieve them, she was informed that Muhammad Ayub Khan had destroyed all of Mirza's documents. However, during a visit to Pakistan invited by Prime Minister Benazir Bhutto and her mother, Nusrat Bhutto, who shared Iranian descent with Nahid Mirza, she was presented with the letters. To her disappointment, the envelopes were empty, bearing only the inscription, "Only yours, as long as there are breaths".

Mirza died in South Kensington on 23 January 2019.

Mirza's South Kensington flat was adorned with pictures of Iskander Mirza, reflecting her love for him. She was an admirer of classical Persian poets, particularly Hafez, whose work she knew by heart and often recited. A writer of Persian poetry herself, Nahid Mirza's home was always filled with guests who appreciated her cooking and conversation.
