= Hazrat Khanoum Nosrat Saltaneh =

Persian noblewoman

Nosrat Saltaneh (10 November 1896 – 22 July 1932), also known as 'Aghaye Andaroun', was a Persian noblewoman. She was the daughter of Mir 'Ali Mardan Khan, Nuzrat ol-Molk and Princess Ashraf us-Sultana Qajar and sister of Amirteymour Kalali.

== Sources ==
- Agheli, Bagher, Teymourtash Dar Sahneye-h Siasate-h Iran ("Teimurtash in the Political Arena of Iran") (Javeed: Tehran, 1371).
- Ansari, Ali, Modern Iran Since 1921: The Pahlavis and After (Longman: London, 2003) ISBN 0-582-35685-7.
- 'Alí Rizā Awsatí (عليرضا اوسطى), Iran in the Past Three Centuries (Irān dar Se Qarn-e Goz̲ashteh - ايران در سه قرن گذشته), Volumes 1 and
- Sheikholeslami, Javad, So-oud va Sog-out-e Teymourtash ("The Rise and Fall of Teymourtash") (Tous: Tehran, 1379) ISBN 964-315-500-5.
