= Marie Petit =

French gambling house owner and diplomat

Marie Petit (born c. 1673) was a Frenchwoman who ran a successful gambling house in Paris. When the new French ambassador to Safavid Persia needed funds, Petit funded his journey and traveled with him to Persia. Following the ambassador's sudden death, Petit conducted diplomatic meetings with leaders in the Safavid domains as a self-proclaimed ambassadress. She was later imprisoned and accused of prostitution, apostasy, and attempted murder.

== Life in Paris ==
Marie Petit was born in Moulins, France, in 1673 to a cobbler and laundress.

When Petit was in her twenties she moved to Paris, where she ran a gambling house, a maison de jeu, located between Mazarine and Rue Dauphine. Petit became very wealthy through her endeavors with the gambling house.

In 1702, Petit met with Jean-Baptiste Fabre (c. 1650–1706) who had just been appointed as the French ambassador to Persia by King Louis XIV. Scholars have suggested that they may have been neighbors or that Fabre was a frequent visitor at the gambling house. Fabre was thirty years her senior. Fabre needed funds for his journey and Petit lent him eight thousand livres in cash, around $450,000 in US dollars in 2020. Petit decided to travel with Fabre to Persia to make sure he followed through on the repayment. Scholars have also suggested that Petit may have also seen it as a business opportunity.

== Persia ==
=== Travel to Persia (1705–1706) ===
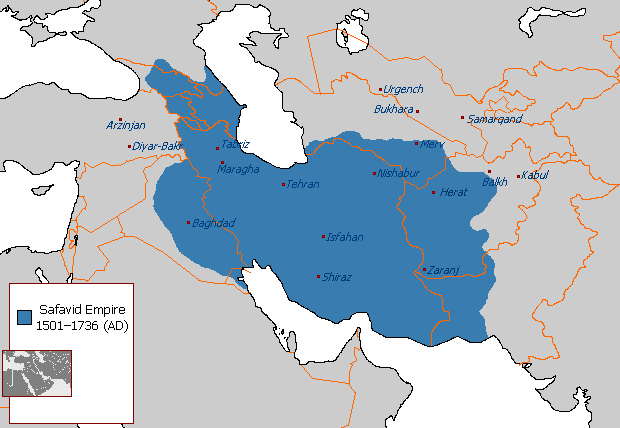
Safavid Persia

Petit and Fabre boarded the ship the Tridan in Toulon, France, on March 2, 1705. On their journey, they stopped in Alexandretta and Aleppo. In Aleppo, there were creditors that Fabre owed money to but he was unable to pay them. Petit loaned him another two thousand livres. They faced more troubles as they tried to leave Aleppo when officials would not allow them to leave. They contacted Fabre’s wife, Anne Cataro in Constantinople, to obtain transit permission from the French ambassador there, Charles de Ferriol. Fabre and Petit eventually traveled to Constantinople, where they stayed for more than a month.

Finally, in June 1706, after traveling in disguise as merchants, they arrived in Yerevan in what was then Persia. Suddenly, on August 16, 1706, just a few months after their arrival, Fabre died, likely from poisoning while on a hunting trip.

=== Ambassadress (1706–1709) ===
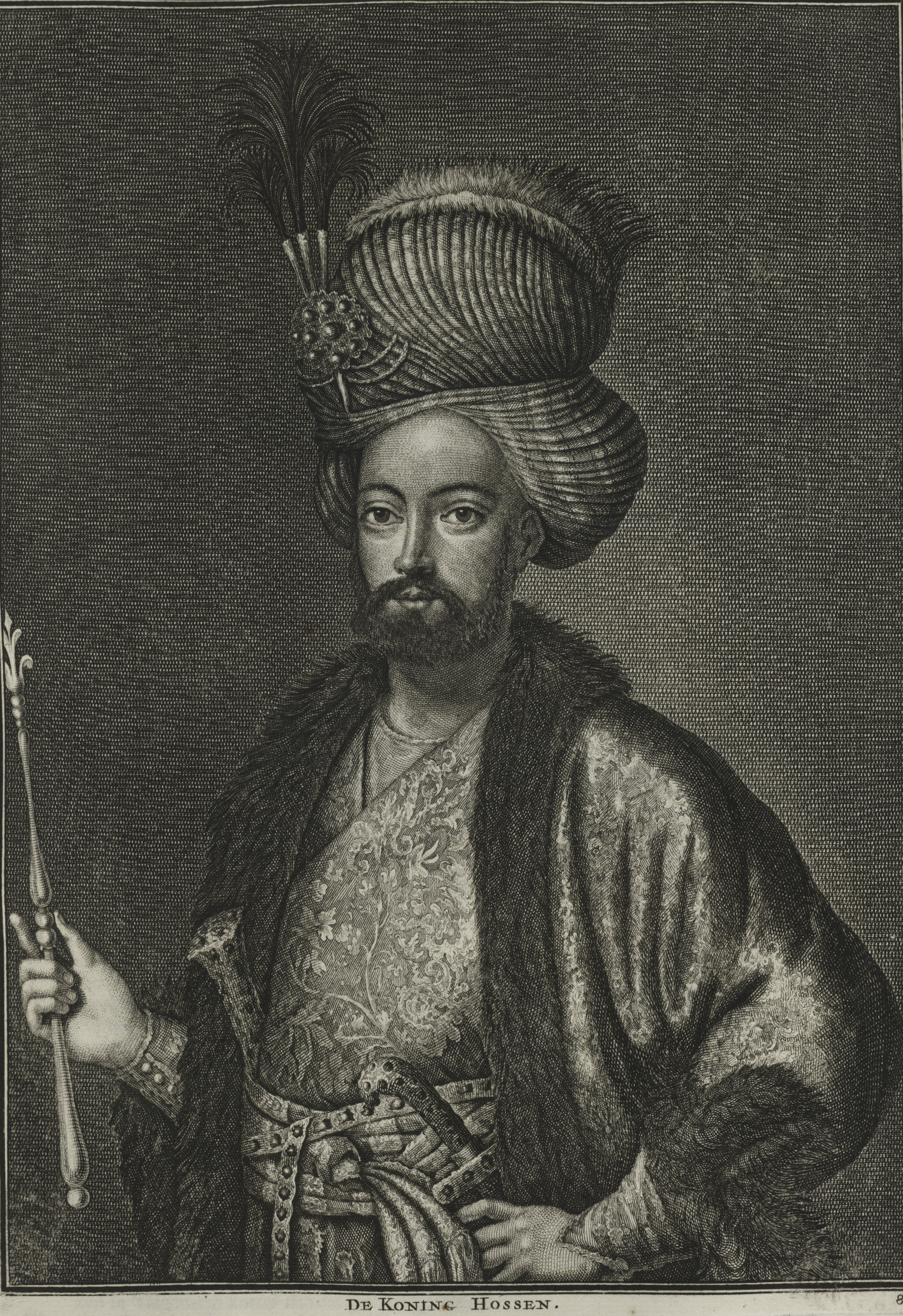
Shah Sultan Husayn

When Fabre died, Petit took over the diplomatic tasks in the region. She met with the Khan of Yerevan, the provincial governor of the region, to negotiate for her funds from Fabre to be returned to her, since Fabre's possessions were under the control of the khan after his death Petit declared herself the French ambassadress as “a representative of the princesses of France.” Over the next three years she engaged in a variety of diplomatic endeavors and was welcomed warmly by Persian officials.

While in Yerevan, Petit pleaded on behalf of a condemned Jesuit who was sentenced to death, even offering to die by his side, so the khan released him. When the Shah Soltan Hosayn, the ruler of all of Persia, heard of this he requested an audience with Petit and she went to Qazvin to meet with him in December 1706. According to Petit, the shah viewed Petit’s diplomatic actions in place of Fabre as legitimate, welcomed her warmly, and considered her instrumental to the diplomatic mission.

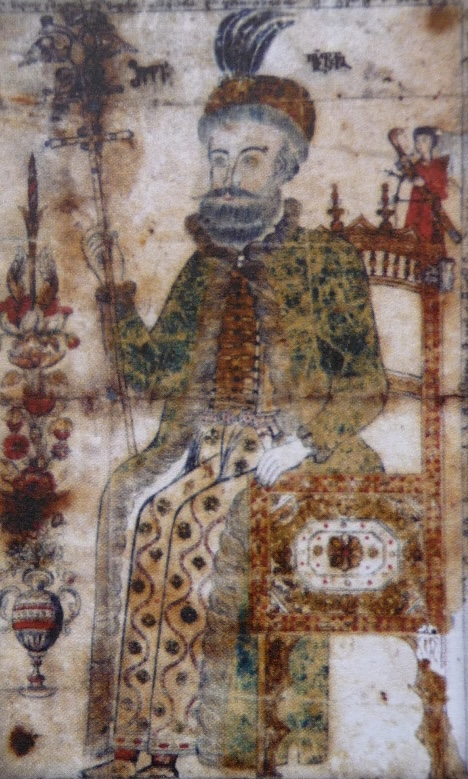
Vakhtang VI

After meeting with the shah, she arrived at the court of Vakhtang VI, governor/king of Kartli in Safavid Georgia, in July 1707, and she was welcomed and stayed several months. The regent wrote to King Louis XIV, describing Petit positively and affirming her Catholic faith and diplomacy skills. According to contemporary critics, Persia and Georgia provided the environment for Petit to perform diplomatic actions while being respected by the local governments.

When other French diplomats and missionaries heard of Petit’s actions they were angry. They accused Petit of being a prostitute or Fabre’s concubine, and claimed that she was only welcomed by the Safavid government through seduction.

Petit’s opponents accused her of many things and made unfounded claims. They labeled her as a prostitute, concubine, seductress, renegade, whore, murderer, thief, and traitor. Rumors spread about her diplomatic actions in Persia and Georgia, suggesting that she could only have had influence there through seduction. Many sources describe her experiences from the perspective of her opponents and portray her in a negative light. She was frequently accused of being not only the mistress of Fabre but also of Shah Soltan Hosayn, the khan of Yerevan, and Vakhtang VI.

Christian missionaries in Persia openly disapproved of her and worried about the reputation of Catholics in Persia, accusing her of sexual misconduct. Due to her association with her dragoman Imām Qoli Beg, who opposed the Christian missionaries in the area, Petit was also seen as abandoning her Catholic faith.

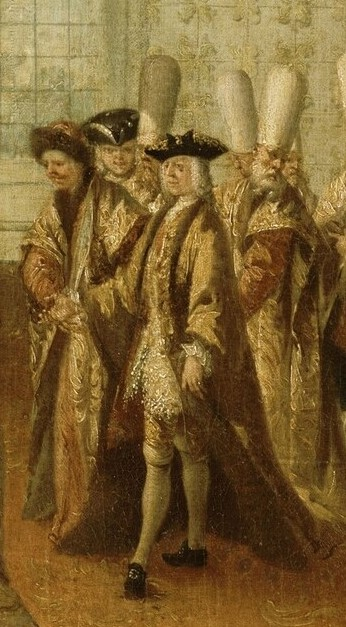
Charles de Ferriol (1652–1722) between 1703 and 1711

Her two major opponents in the political realm were Charles de Ferriol, the ambassador to France in Constantinople, and his secretary Pierre Victor Michel. When they first heard of Fabre’s death, Ferriol sent Michel to Persia to become the ambassador there, though Louis XIV had not appointed him at that time. Ferriol claimed that he sent Michel to bring legitimacy back to the diplomatic mission. The two men accused Petit of creating scandal in Persia and committing illicit sexual crimes. They also accused Petit of assassinating Fabre. Ferriol described her as, "a roaring lion who ravaged, the middle of Asia, the Catholic religion and the honor of the nation." Some scholars have suggested that there may have already been previous tension between Fabre and Ferriol, due to their connection in Constantinople, which may have increased Ferriol’s dislike of Petit.

Michel eventually found Petit after months of searching for her and she said that he tried to rape and kill her when he found her in Tabriz. Michel was able to take Petit's place, claiming that he was saving the diplomatic mission from threats to Catholicism and recovering France's reputation in Persia, which he believed had been tainted by Petit. He argued that all of the disorders and scandals in the diplomatic mission were caused by her. However, while Petit was granted an audience with the shah after having only recently arrived in Persia, it took Michel another two years before he was granted an audience.

Michel sent Petit back to France. On her way home, Petit traveled to Constantinople, where she had to stay for several months with Ferriol while dealing with health issues such as kidney stones and tuberculosis before boarding a ship, L’Entreprenant, back to France.

== Imprisonment (1709–1713) ==
After returning to France, Petit was served with a royal arrest warrant and taken to the Maison de Refuge in Marseille, a prison for women, particularly prostitutes, where she stayed from 1709–1713. She was about 35 years old when she arrived. She was accused of poisoning Fabre, abandoning the Catholic faith, prostitution, and attempting to assassinate Michel. Petit fought these accusations through several trials and lawsuits, claiming that all of these accusations were baseless and made by Michel and Ferriol in an attempt to taint her reputation. In her trials, she showed letters from Vakhtang VI in her support and received letters on her behalf from Fabre’s widow, Anne Cataro.

Petit's lawyer argued that Petit was qualified as an ambassadress. He argued that her attempts to save the Frenchman who was sentenced to death reflected her skills as a negotiator. Petit herself wrote to Louis XIV to defend her reputation. She launched a countersuit against Michel for the debt she was owed from Fabre. She also accused Michel of attempting to murder and rape her on multiple occasions while they were still in Persia. She questioned the witnesses used in the trial, since many, she argued, were in Michel's pay. Throughout her trial she asked for justice, rather than a pardon.

Petit frequently wrote to Louis de Pontchartain, the French chancellor who had signed the warrant for her arrest, in an attempt to keep her case and situation fresh in his mind. She described herself as 'l'héroine de Perse' or the heroine of Persia, arguing wrongful imprisonment.

Petit dealt with harsh conditions in prison. The Refuge was overcrowded and food was in short supply. Petit experienced health problems such as kidney stones while imprisoned. She may have also started a prison riot in 1709 when she demanded that the gatekeeper hand over the keys to her, and the police were called. She jumped on one officer, saying that she did not recognize his authority. She encouraged her fellow prisoners to join her and it was soon a full riot.

She was imprisoned for three years before she received a verdict of an additional year in prison. She was released in 1713.

== Later life ==
After she was released, Petit eventually returned to Paris in 1715, having lost all of her wealth and possessions. In 1719, she obtained a hearing to revoke all of her past legal judgements, which she was granted. Little else is known about her later life, but it is speculated that she died in her forties not long after her release from prison.

== Legacy ==
For centuries Marie Petit’s story was told but treated as a story for novels rather than historical analysis. Novels included:

- Clarétie, L. Marie Petit. Roman d'aventures, 1705 (Paris: Librairie Molière, 1904).
- L. Aurenche and H. Coquet, La Brelandière ambassadrice du roi soleil. Roman historique (Paris: Nouvelles editions latines, 1945).
- Grès, Y. La Belle Brelandière: ambassadeur en Perse (Paris: Société continentale d'éditions modernes illustrées, 1973).
- Schoeller, G. Marie d'Ispahan (Paris: Laffont, 1992).

Petit wrote of her experiences in Persia and sent them to the novelist Alain-René Lesage. However, when Pontchartain heard of this he wrote to Lesage, asking him to reject Petit's request for him to rewrite and publish her memoir. Petit's original manuscript was lost.

== See also ==
On Ferriol see: Saint-Priest, A. Mémoire sur l'ambassade de France en Turquie, ed Charles Schefer (Paris: Leroux, 1877).
