= Kashana Home =

Shelter home for destitute and orphaned girls in Lahore, Pakistan

Kashana Home is a shelter home for the destitute and orphaned girls located in Lahore, Pakistan. It was established in 1973 by the city district government of Lahore.

Kashana Home made headlines in 2020 when its former superintendent accused Punjab minister Ajmal Cheema of 'misconduct' at the facility.

The organisation was first established as Kashana Welfare Home for destitute girls and women in 1973 in Lahore. After the Lahore facility was founded, two more Kashana Homes were established by the government in Rawalpindi and Sargodha.

== Kashana controversy ==
In 2020, Iqra Kainat, a young woman involved in the Kashana Home controversy, was reportedly murdered or possibly committed suicide by taking chemicals. According to the official postmortem report, she died of hunger and thirst.
