= Mehdi Hamidi Shirazi =

Iranian poet

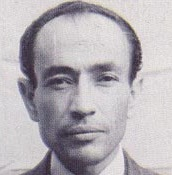
- Born: May 5, 1914; Shiraz, Iran
- Died: July 14, 1986 (aged 72); Tehran, Iran
- Resting place: near Tomb of Hafez
- Occupations: Poet, Writer, Translator, university professor
- Spouse: Nahid Afkham
- Writing career
- Literary movement: Persian literature

Mehdi Hamidi Shirazi (Persian: مهدی حمیدی شیرازی) (5 May 1914 Shiraz, Iran – 14 July 1986, Tehran, Iran) was an Iranian poet and university professor.

== Works ==
- Šokufahā yā naḡmahā-ye jadid, a selection of poems, Shiraz, 1938 (collections of poetry)
- Baʿd az yak sāl, Shiraz, 1940 (collections of poetry)
- ʿEšq-e dar ba dar, 3 vols., Shiraz, 1940-52 (collections of poetry)
- Ašk-e maʿšuq (The tears of the beloved), Shiraz, 1942 (collections of poetry)
- Sālhā-ye siāh (on the colonial policy of Great Britain, the communist takeover of Azerbaijan, and the tribal uprising in Fārs after World War II), Tehran, 1946 (suppressed) (collections of poetry)
- Šāʿer dar āsmān, Shiraz, 1942
- Zamzama-ye behešt
- Fonun o anvāʿ-e šeʿr-e fārsi, Tehran, 1973a
- Dah farmān, collection of poems, Tehran, 1965
- Fereštagān-e zamin (Angels of the earth), prose, 1942
- Sabok-sarihā-ye ghalam (The frivolities of the pen), prose, Tehran, ca. 1943
- Ṭelesm-e šekasta, 1945
- Šāhkārhā-ye Ferdowsi, Tehran, 1947
- Daryā-ye gowhar, an anthology of contemporary prose, poetry and translations, 3 vols., Tehran, 1950-59 (vol. 3 reviewed by Iraj Afšār, in Yaḡmā 9/2, 1954, pp. 94–95)
- Behešt-e soḵan, a select anthology of classical Persian poetry with critical commentaries, 2 vols., Tehran, 1958–59
- ʿAruż-e Ḥamidi, on Persian prosody, Tehran, 1963
- ʿAṭṭār dar maṯnavihā-ye gozida-ye u wa gozida-ye maṯnawihā-ye u, Tehran, 1968
- “Taṣvir-e šeʿr-e ghadim dar masir-e šeʿr-e jadid”, Armaḡān 40, 1971, pp. 361–64, 442-45, 514-16, 589-91, 680-83
- “Baḥṯ-i dar bāra-ye Saʿdi,” in Manṣur Rastgār Fasāʾi, ed., Saʿdi, Shiraz, 1973b, pp. 70–127; “ʿElm-e bayān,” Ḵerad wa kušeš, no. 1, 1978, pp. 95–114;
- Fonun-e šeʿr va kālbodhā-ye pulādin-e ān, a collection of poems, Tehran, 1984
- Šeʿr dar ʿaṣr-e Qājār, Tehran, 1985; Divān, Tehran, 1988. His major translation is of W. Somerset Maugham’s The Moon and Sixpence, as Māh wa šeš peni, Tehran, 1950.
