= Abbas Farzanegan =

Iranian General and Diplomat

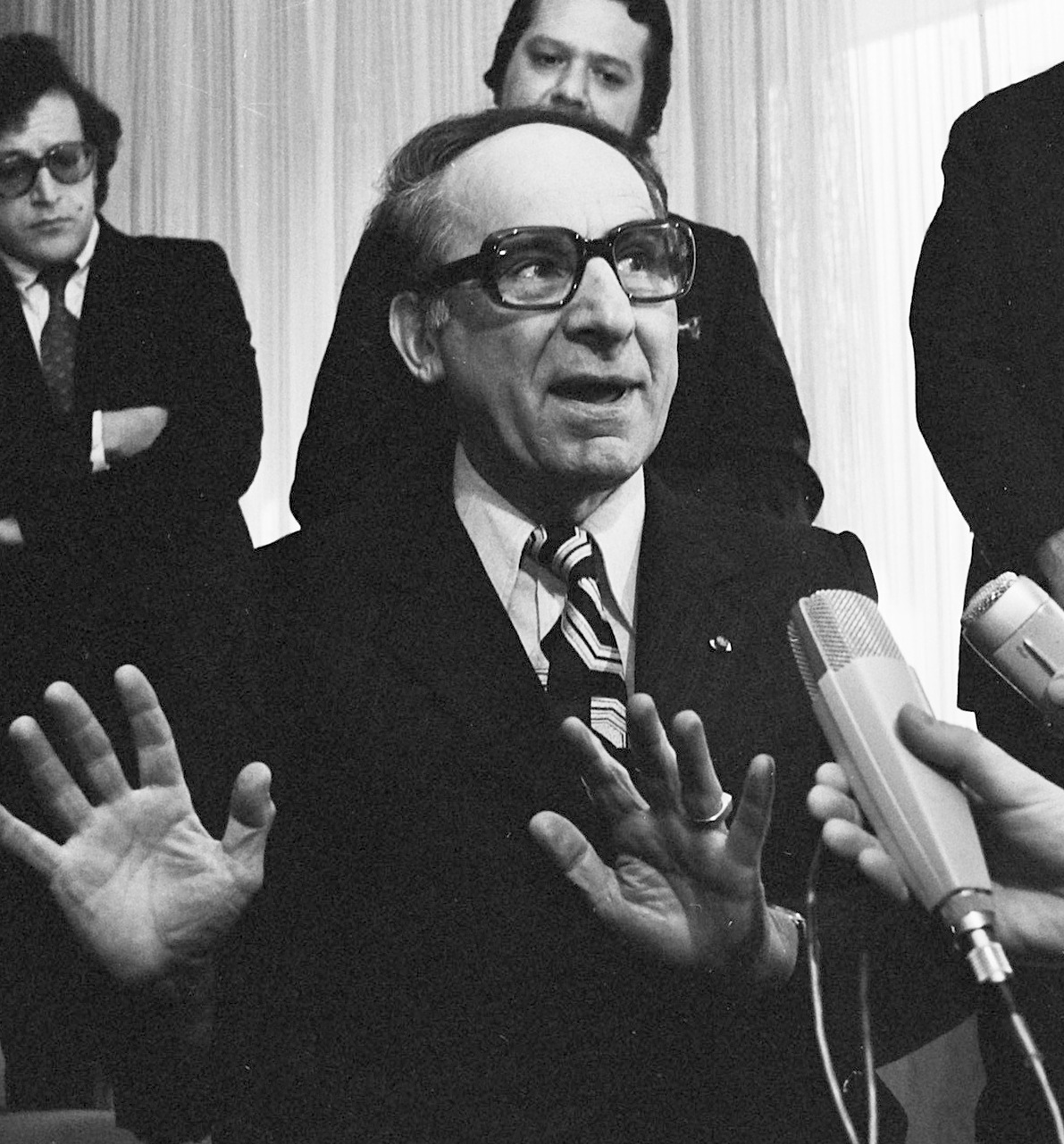

Ambassador to the Netherlands
- In office ? – 16 March 1974

Ambassador to Saudi Arabia
- In office ?–?

Ambassador to Kuwait
- In office ?–?

Ambassador to Norway
- In office November 1964 – June 1968

Governor of Isfahan
- In office ?–?

Minister of Post and Telegraph
- In office 1953–1955
- Prime Minister: Fazlollah Zahedi

Personal details
- Born: 1914 qajar Iran
- Died: 2004 (aged 89–90) Tampa, Florida, United States

Military service
- Allegiance: Pahlavi Iran
- Branch/service: Imperial Iranian Army
- Years of service: 1946–1975
- Rank: Brigadier general

Abbas Farzanegan (1914–2004) served as Iran's ambassador to Saudi Arabia and four other countries during Mohammad-Rezā Shāh Pahlavi's reign. He served in a variety of roles, including governor of the state of Esfahan, communications minister, and general. He was part of the plot to overthrow Mohammed Mosaddeq and install Mohammad Reza Pahlavi to power. He lived in the United States since 1975.

Farzanegan died on March 17, 2004, at the age of 94.
