= Roland Marchal =

French sociologist

Roland Marchal is a French sociologist who was imprisoned in Iran from June 2019 to March 2020. His research focuses on civil wars in Africa. In 1997, Marchal joined the staff of the Centre for International Studies (CERI) at Sciences Po. His research specialized in civil wars in Africa.

In June 2019, Marchal traveled to Iran to visit his Franco-Iranian Sciences Po colleague Fariba Adelkhah. He was arrested upon arrival at Tehran airport. Adelkhah was imprisoned as well. On 28 October 2019, Marchal's lawyer in Iran said Iranian authorities had accused his client of "collusion against national security". Marchal and Adelkhah were held in Evin Prison. On 7 February 2020, their lawyer said the two had petitioned prison authorities to allow them to marry. Their trial was scheduled to begin on 3 March 2020, but was postponed due to the coronavirus pandemic. Marchal was released on 20 March 2020 in exchange for an Iranian who was jailed in France.
