= Fariba Adelkhah =

French-Iranian academic

- فریبا عادلخواه
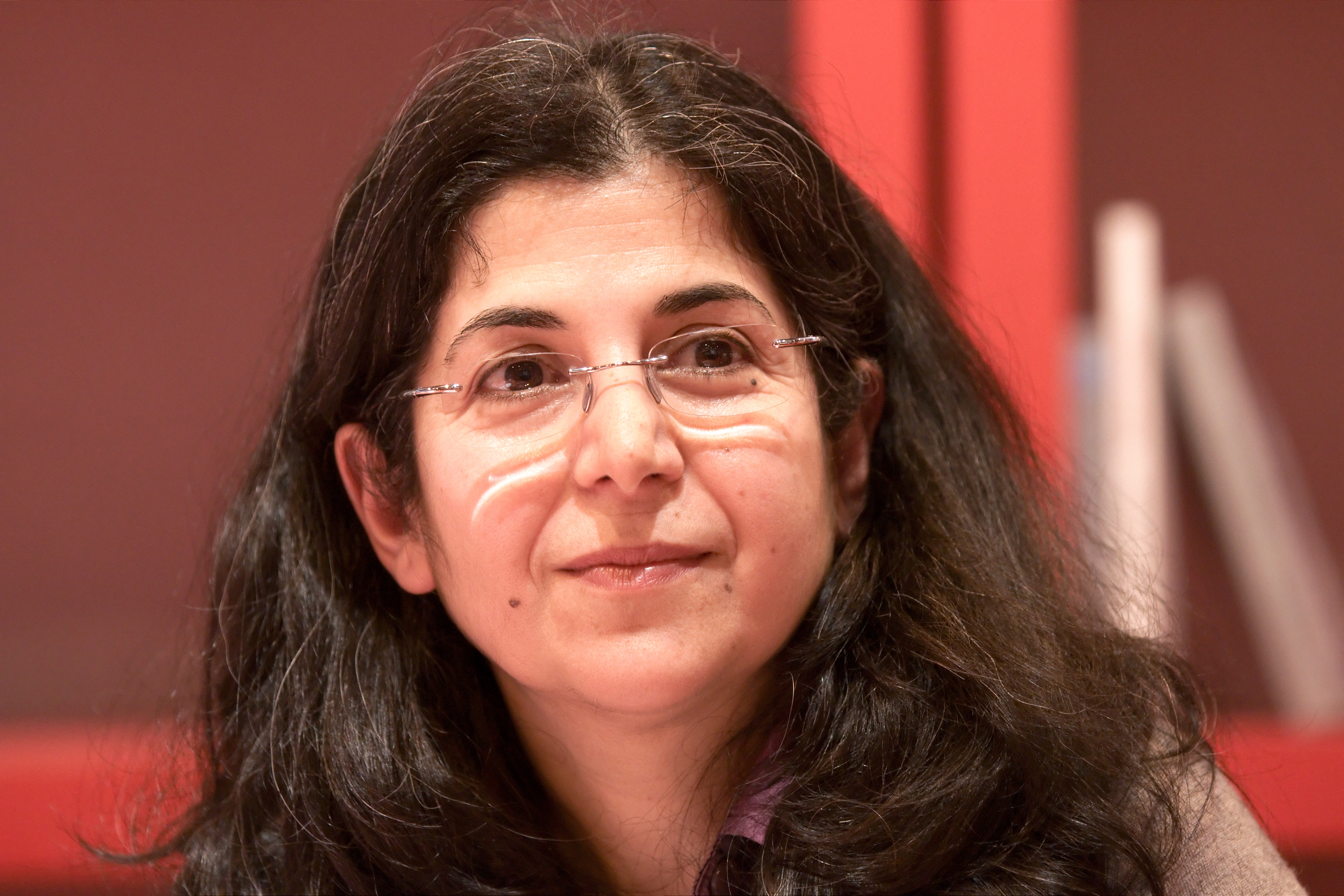
- Adelkhah in 2010
- Born: 25 April 1959 (age 67); Tehran, Iran
- Education: School for Advanced Studies in the Social Sciences; Marc Bloch University
- Occupations: Anthropologist, researcher
- Employers: Institute of International Studies; French National Centre for Scientific Research
- Partner: Roland Marchal
- Website: Profile

Fariba Adelkhah (Persian: فریبا عادلخواه; born 25 April 1959) is a French-Iranian anthropologist and academic at Sciences Po who was imprisoned in Iran from 2019 until 2023.

== Early life and career ==
Born in Tehran, Adelkhah studied in France, first at Université Strasbourg II and then at the School for Advanced Studies in the Social Sciences. In 1990, she obtained a "very honourable" mention for her Ph.D. thesis on women in Iran, "an anthropological approach of post-revolutionary Iran: the case of Islamic women" (Une approche anthropologique de l'Iran post-révolutionnaire. Le cas des femmes islamiques), with Jean-Pierre Digard as her advisor. Since 2004, she has been a Research Director at the Fondation nationale des sciences politiques. As a researcher at the Centre for International Research of Paris Institute of Political Studies (Sciences Po), she authored a number of publications on Iran and Afghanistan. She is a member of the scientific council of the periodical Iranian Studies and of Revue des mondes musulmans et de la Méditerranée.

== Imprisonment in Iran ==
On 14 July 2019, Persian-language media from outside of Iran reported that she had been arrested in Iran. Her arrest would date back to 7 June, when she last connected to her WhatsApp account. The Iranian Human Rights website Gozaar stated that she had been arrested by the Islamic Revolutionary Guard Corps and was being detained at Evin Prison. French authorities stated that Adelkhah was being denied access to consular assistance, and are demanding access to their citizen.

In June 2019, Adelkhah's Sciences Po colleague Roland Marchal was also arrested in Iran when he came to visit her. On 7 February 2020, their lawyer said the two had petitioned prison authorities to allow them to get married. Marchal and Adelkhah were reportedly to go on trial on 3 March 2020 but it was postponed due to COVID-19 pandemic in Iran. Marchal was released on 20 March 2020 as part of a prisoner swap, but no verdict was reached on the case of Adelkhah.

On 16 May 2020, the 15th Chamber of the Tehran Court sentenced Adelkhah to five years' imprisonment for conspiring against national security, and one year for propaganda against the state. During her trial, she was represented by Iranian lawyer Saeid Dehghan. Although Adelkhah is French-Iranian, Iran does not recognise this dual citizenship, and so continues to deny her access to French consular services.

Sciences Po is in contact with the French Ministry of Europe and Foreign Affairs to campaign and raise awareness for Adelkhah's release.

On 12 January 2022, Adelkhah's Paris-based support group, announced that her house arrest was over and she had been re-imprisoned at Evin. She was released from Evin prison again on 10 February 2023.

In October 2023, Adelkhah returned to Paris and was welcomed at Sciences Po on October 20.

== Works ==
- Ramadan et politique Paris : CNRS éditions, 2000. ISBN 9782271058157, OCLC 45647393
- Guerre et terre en Afghanistan Aix-en-Provence PUP, Presses Univ. de Provence 2013. ISBN 9782853998840, OCLC 935073879
- Dubai, cité globale Paris : CNRS, 2001. ISBN 9782271059451, OCLC 758161444
- Les mille et une frontières de l'Iran: Quand les voyages forment la nation
- El estado del mundo
- Un péril islamiste? (Interventions) (French Edition)
- The Moral Economy of the Madrasa: Islam and Education Today (New Horizons in Islamic Studies)
- Thermidor en Iran (Espace international) (French Edition) Bruxelles: Complexe, 1993. ISBN 9782870275023, OCLC 876017490
- Etre moderne en Iran (Recherches internationales) (French Edition) Paris : Karthala, 1998. ISBN 9782865378333, OCLC 39519216
- La révolution sous le voile: Femmes islamiques d'Iran
- Voyages du développement : émigration, commerce, exil, Paris : Éd. Karthala, 2007. ISBN 9782845869400, OCLC 239245994
- Les mosquées : espaces, institutions et pratiques, Aix-en-Provence : Presses Universitaires de Provence, 2009. ISBN 9782853997379, OCLC 879231733

== Works in English ==
- Being Modern in Iran (The CERI Series in Comparative Politics and International Studies) London: Hurst & Company, 2000. ISBN 9781850655183, OCLC 861052859
- The Thousand and One Borders of Iran: Travel and Identity (Iranian Studies) London: Routledge, 2015. ISBN 9781138919716, OCLC 949206351
- The Moral Economy of the Madrasa (New Horizons in Islamic Studies: Second Series) London; New York: Routledge, 2011. ISBN 9780415589888, OCLC 912636984

== See also ==
- List of foreign nationals detained in Iran
