= Sarkis Djanbazian =

Iranian-Armenian Artist

- Born: January 15, 1913; Armavir, Russian Empire
- Died: December 11, 1963 (aged 50); Tehran, Iran
- Occupations: Ballet master, dancer, choreographer, producer
- Known for: First male ballet dancer in Iran. Founder of a ballet academy in Iran.
- Spouse: Fleur Djanbazian (m. 1950)
- Children: 2

Sarkis Djanbazian (Armenian: Սարգիս Ջանբազյան; Persian: سرکیس جانبازیان), also written as Sarkis Janbazian, (15 January 1913 in Armavir – 11 December 1963 in Tehran) was a Russian-born Iranian-Armenian artist. He was the first male ballet master, dancer, choreographer, producer, as well as the founder of a ballet academy in Iran.

== Biography ==
Sarkis Djanbazian was born in Armavir, then part of the Russian Empire (now Armenia). As the Encyclopedia Iranica states, from early childhood, Djanbazian took an avid interest in the arts, especially in dance. After graduating from high school, he went to Leningrad (St. Petersburg at the time) to study dance. He graduated from Vaganova Dance Academy of Leningrad on 14 January 1936 and from Lesgaft University with a Masters of Arts degree on 15 November 1936. After graduation, he worked as a principal dancer, choreographer, and artistic director in Kirov Theatre in Leningrad until July 1938.

As the Russian Communist government exercised heavy political pressure on Armenians, Djanbazian left Russia for Iran in 1938, settling in Qazvin. There, he decided to found a dance school. However, upon being expelled after this proposal to the city council, he turned himself to the Armenian Church in Qazvin. With allowance of the Church's head priest, he was allowed to hold dance classes on the rooftop of the church, in the same year of 1938.

Djanbazian left Qazvin for Tehran in 1942. There, he started to give dancing classes in the Armenian Kušeš high school after the lessons had ended, initially for some 150 students. His perseverance, energy, and tireless effort made him establish the Tehran Ballet School in 1942 in Tehran.

Djanbazian staged many full stage ballets in Iran. As the Encyclopedia Iranica states, these included but are not limited to Alexander Pushkin’s “Fountain of Baghchehsarai” and “Dreams of Hafez,” and Reinhold Glière’s “Chinese Flower Girl,” and choreographed shorter ballets such as “Jealousy” (Ḥesādat), “Persian Miniature” (Miniātorhā-ye Irāni), “Anuš,” as well as several classical and traditional Persian dance pieces including “Gol-e gandom,” “Woodchopper” (Tabar-zan), “Sailors” (Malavānān), “Life and Death” (Zendegi va marg, widely known as “Snake Dance” or Raqṣ- mār), “Prayers in the mountains” (Raqṣ-e namāz), “Qāli-e Kermān,” and “Šālikāri”. As the Encyclopedia Iranica states, Djanbazian took a great deal of interest in Iranian culture, and tried tirelessly to incorporate Iranian themes and stories in his artistic work. Despite his lack of fluency in Persian, his interest in Persian literature led him, with the collaboration of Ehsan Yarshater, to the production and staging of “Rostam and Tahmina” ballet, based on a love story in the Ferdowsi's Shahnameh. Over the course of his career, he collaborated with many artists and intellectuals of the time. He also served, in 1948, as the head of the faculty at the National Guard and Armed Forces Academy (Laškar-e gard-e šāhanšāhi), where he trained high-ranking officials of the country.

As the Encyclopedia Iranica lastly states, Djanbazian founded the Folk Dance and Song Ensemble (Goruh-e raqṣ o āvāz-e maḥalli) conducted by maestro Edik Hovespian in 1959. Later on, this ensemble continued their performances under the direction of maestro Hovik Gasparian at the second national dance festival in Iran in 1962. Sarkis Djanbazian died of heart attack at the age of fifty on 11 December 1963 in Tehran. His greatest concern was that his school might not continue after his death. The school remained open and instructors such as Yagāna Šāygān, ʿAbd-Allāh Nāẓemi, Yerjanik Djanbazian, and Zohra Amjadi taught there until Djanbazian's daughter, Anna, returned home after the completion of her dance education in Russia. She took over the academy in 1972 and managed it until 1984, when she left Iran and continued her dance activities in the United States, at the Djanbazian Dance Company in La Crescenta, California.

=== Personal life ===
In 1950, Djanbazian married Fleur Djanbazian; they had two children, Anna and Albert Djanbazian. Anna received her education in dance first under her father's direction and then continued her training in Russia after her father died.

== Bibliography ==
- Djanbazian Dance Academy, the 60th Anniversary,” Los Angeles, 2002 (booklet)
- Ehsan Yarshater, “Jānbāziān, Ostād-e bāleh (Djanbazian, Ballet Master),” Rowšanfekr 203, 20 Tir 1336 Š./11 July 1957
- Sāʿati dar ākādemi-ye Jānbāziān (An Hour in Djanbazian Academy)," Sepid o siāh 292, 20 Farvardin 1338 Š./10 April 1959, pp. 32–34
