= Jean Baptiste Vanmour =

French painter (1671–1737)

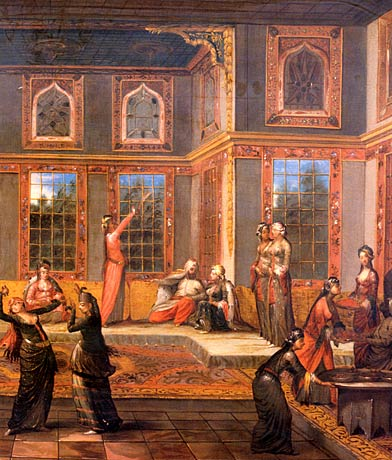
- Scene in the Harem with the Sultan, painting by Vanmour
- Born: 9 January 1671; Valenciennes, France
- Died: 22 January 1737 (aged 66); Constantinople (Istanbul)
- Known for: Painter
- Movement: Orientalist

Jean Baptiste Vanmour or Van Mour (9 January 1671 – 22 January 1737) was a Flemish-French painter, remembered for his detailed portrayal of life in the Ottoman Empire during the Tulip Era and the rule of Sultan Ahmed III.

== Biography ==
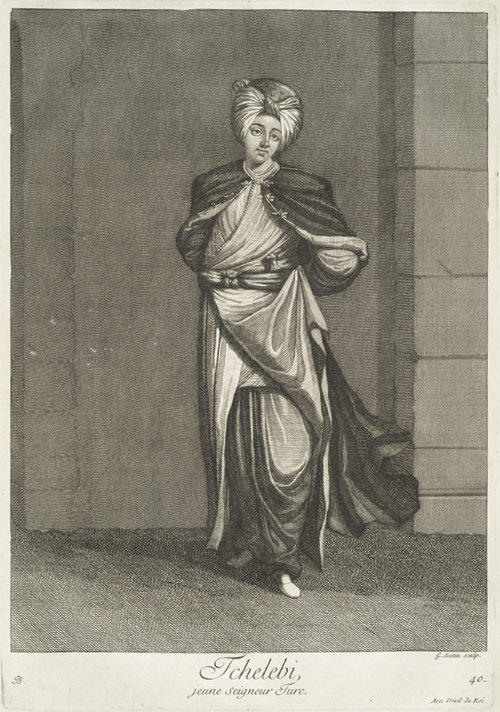
Engraving from the Recueil de cent estampes représentant différentes nations du Levant

Van Mour was a native of Valenciennes, a Flemish town that at the time of his birth belonged to the Spanish Netherlands, but since 1678 to France. He studied art in the studio of Jacques-Albert Gérin, and his work attracted the attention of an aristocrat and statesman of the time, Marquis Charles de Ferriol. Van Mour accompanied the De Ferriol to Constantinople after the Marquis' appointment as the French Ambassador in 1699. It was there that De Ferriol commissioned Van Mour to do one hundred oil paintings of the local people.

After De Ferriol returned to France in 1711, Van Mour worked for a variety of other diplomats in the Ottoman Empire. A series of one hundred engravings were created after Van Mour's portraits, which was published by Le Hay in 1714, titled as Recueil de cent estampes représentant différentes nations du Levant. The book had a great influence in Western Europe and was published in at least five languages. The wide-distribution and popular reception of the Recueil de cent estampes led to an increased recognition of Van Mour as an artist.

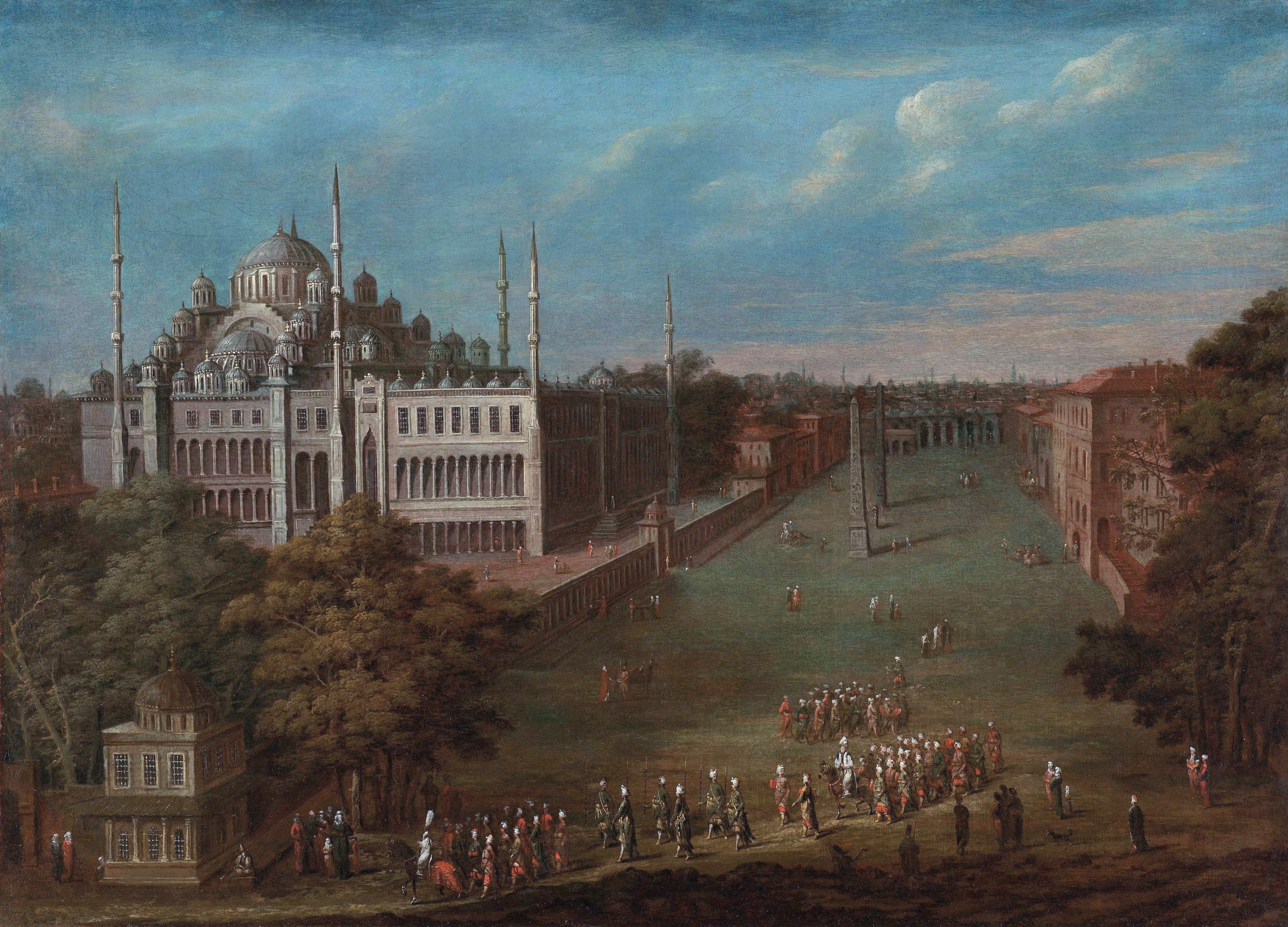
The Grand Vizier is crossing the Atmeydan Square

Painting audiences with the Sultan became Van Mour's speciality; he only had to change the setting and a few faces. Van Mour worked with assistants to fulfill all his obligations. In 1725 he was granted the extraordinary title of Peintre Ordinaire du Roy en Levant in recognition of both his and the Levant's importance to the French government.

== Dutch Van Mour series ==
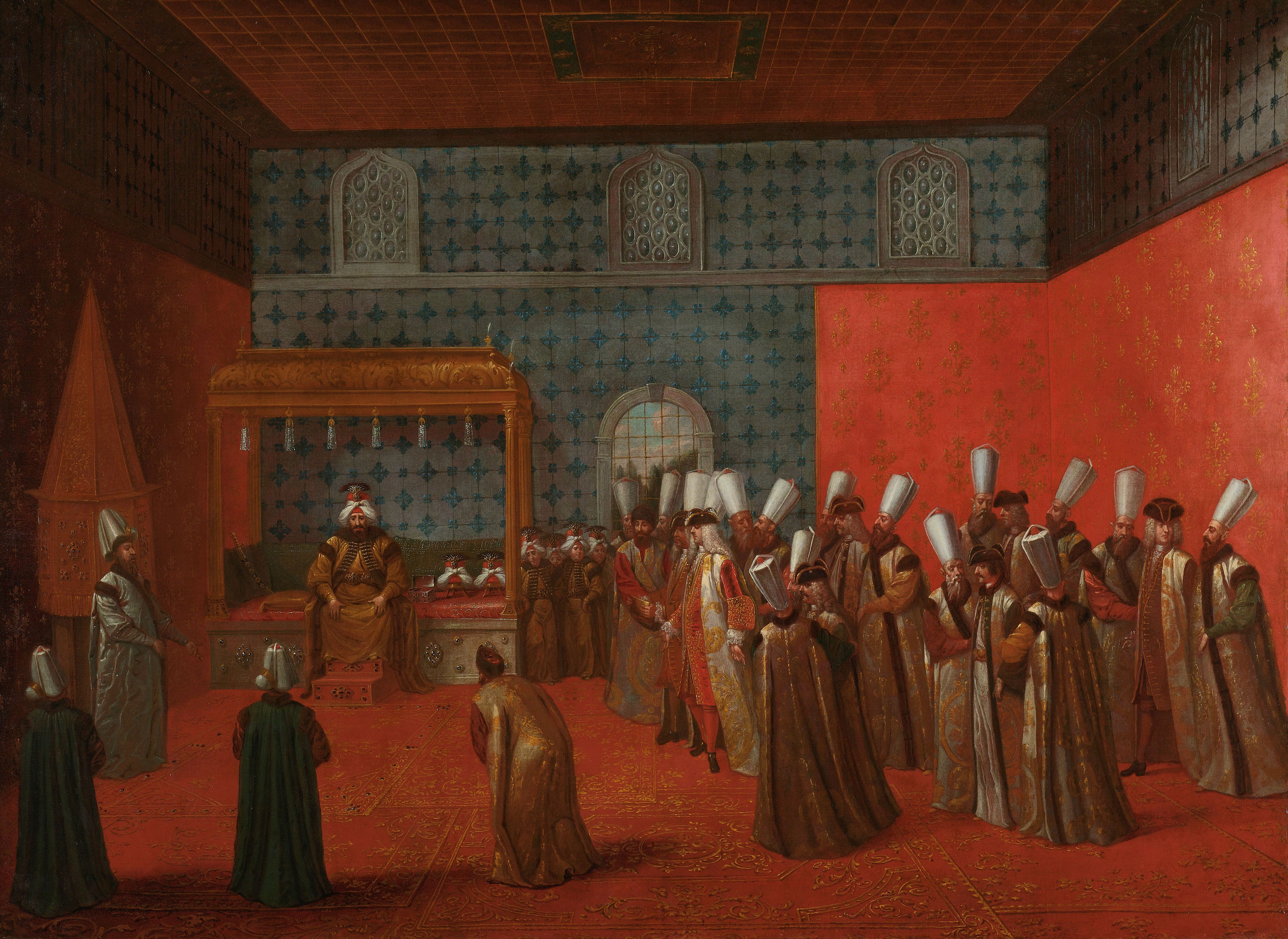
Audience with the Sultan Ahmed III on October, 10th, 1724, painting by Van Mour

In 1727 the Dutch ambassador Cornelis Calkoen asked Van Mour to record his audience with Sultan Ahmed III on canvas. Van Mour was allowed to enter the palace during these ceremonies accompanying the ambassador and his retinue; therefore, he was familiar with the special protocol that prevailed in the Ottoman court for ambassador's receptions. Calkoen took many paintings of Van Mour with him, such as when he was appointed as ambassador in Dresden for the Dutch Republic.

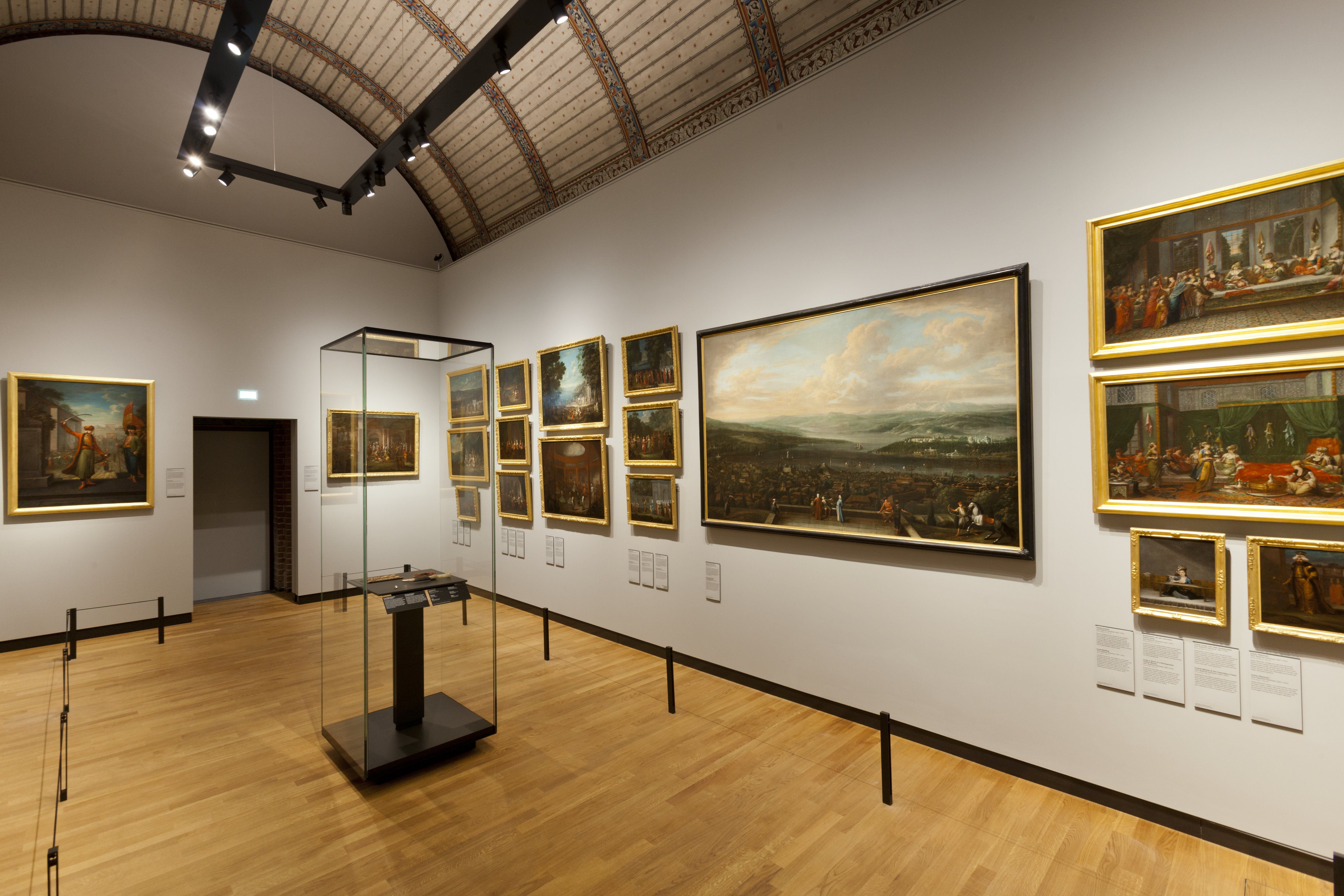
Vanmour series on show in the Rijksmuseum

In his will of 1762, the bachelor Calkoen directed his nephew and heir Nicolaas to keep the collection together, and it was his express wish that they were to hang in the room of Amsterdam City Hall reserved for directors of Eastern trade. Unbeknownst to him or his heir, soon the city hall itself was ceded to the French authorities and became the residence of King Louis Napoleon. Nicolaas, who went on to play a central role in various negotiations on behalf of the Batavian Republic, died himself in 1817 and bequeathed this collection to the closest substitute institution he could think of, namely the Directie van den Levantschen handel te Amsterdam, or 'Directors of the trade with the Levant in Amsterdam'. That institute was dissolved in 1826 whereupon the collection was absorbed into the national collection and spread over multiple locations. In 1903 the paintings were reunited and have since been on show together in the Rijksmuseum collection.

== See also ==
- List of Orientalist artists
- Orientalism
