= Pacifique de Provins =

Pacifique de Provins (1588 in Provins – 1648) was a French Capuchin Father of the 17th century. He established a French mission in Isfahan in 1627 with the agreement of Cardinal de Richelieu and Père Joseph, and the benevolence of Shah Abbas I of Persia. Pacifique de Provins relied on the help of an Armenian named Khajah Muchaq to obtain an agreement from the Shah. Results were minimum however in increasing relations and trade, and English and Dutch influence remained paramount. Progress was also hampered by the long-standing Franco-Ottoman alliance, the Ottoman Empire being a regular enemy of Persia.

A new mission was sent in 1665 under de Lalin (or Lalain), Mariage and La Boullaye le Gouz. A treaty was signed after many deceptions and tribulations but Lalin died at Bandar Abbas in 1667.

== Works ==
- Pacifique de Provins, Relation du Voyage de Perse (Paris: Nicolas et lean de la Coste, 1631)
