= Djahanguir Riahi =

French-Iranian art dealer

Djahanguir Riahi (22 September 1914 – 28 April 2014) was a French-Iranian businessman and a renowned collector of 18th century French furniture. Riahi has been declared one of the greatest art collectors since 1945.

Riahi started out as an engineer and road-builder, eventually acquiring an apartment in France. He started collecting in the 1970s, in order to furnish the apartment in the grandest possible tradition. Riahi swiftly achieved notoriety among French dealers due to regularly outbidding them on the finest pieces at auction. Among the master craftsmen represented in the collection were André Charles Boulle, the ébénistes Bernard II van Risamburgh and Martin Carlin; and carpets and tapestry from the Savonnerie and Gobelins manufactories. Some of his individual pieces included wall brackets from Marie Antoinette's bedroom and a cabinet made for the Comtesse de Provence. 59 pieces from the collection, including pieces with royal provenances, were purchased in 2000 by Christie's and estimated to raise 25 million dollars when auctioned off. In 2012 Christie's held a second auction dedicated to former Riahl collection pieces.
