= Mir 'Ali Mardan Khan, Nuzrat ol-Molk =

Head of the Timurid dynasty in 19th-century Iran

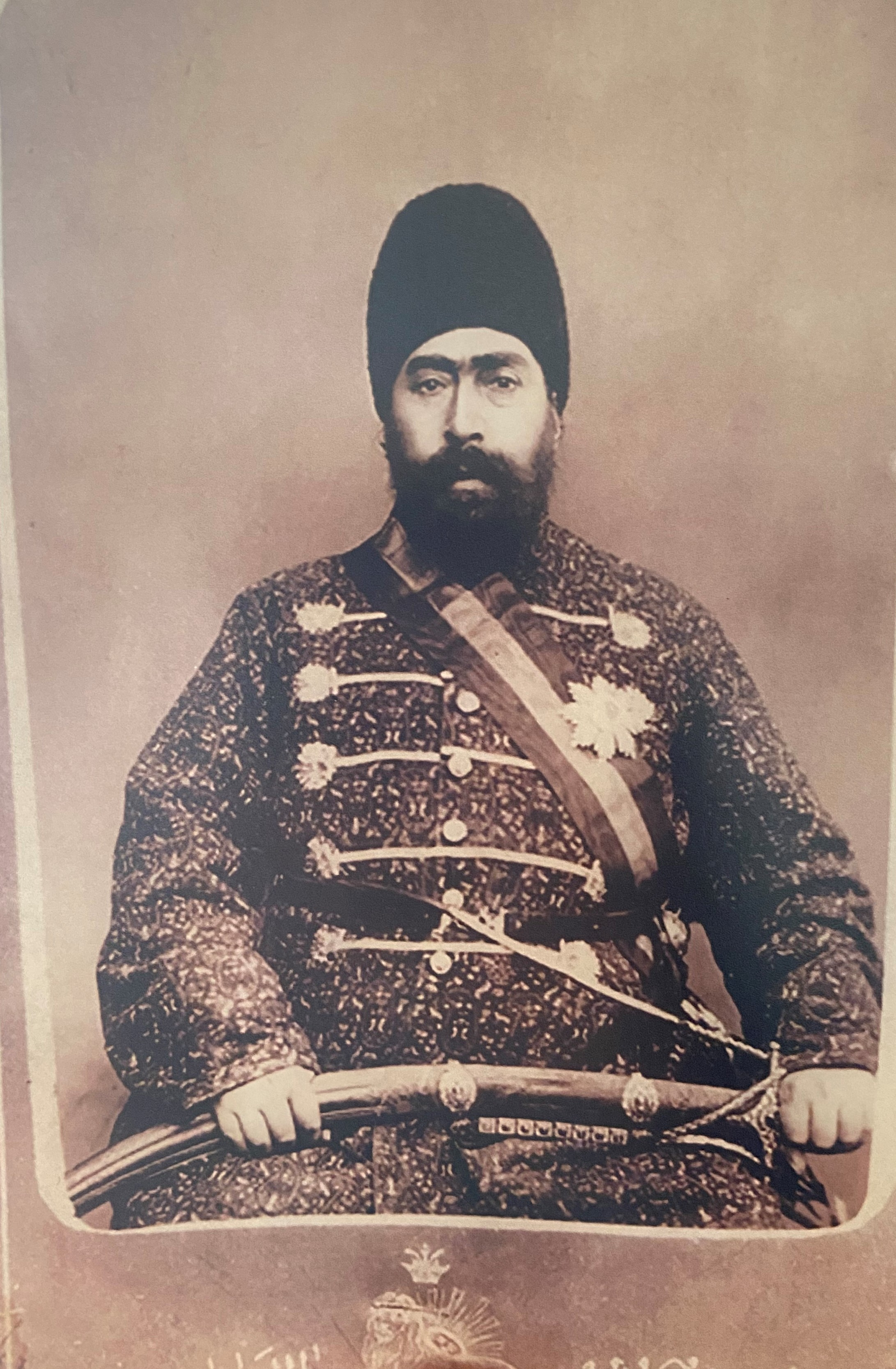
Nusrat-ul-Mulk in 1875

Mir Ali Mardan Shah, Nuzrat ol-Molk (Persian: میرعلی مردان شاه، نصرت الملک; 1830 – 1897) was a Timurid prince and the head of the Timurid dynasty in Qajar era Iran.

A direct descendant of Tamerlane, Nuzrat ol-Mulk played a pivotal role in the political landscape of Iran. His notable military achievements included victories against the Turkmens and the Afghans, which led him to gain favor with Naser al-Din Shah Qajar. Impressed by Nuzrat ol-Mulk's prowess and character, the Shah expressed a desire to welcome him into his family. Since he had no unmarried daughters, the Shah proposed a matrimonial alliance with his brother Rokn ed-Dowleh's daughter, an offer that was accepted.

In addition, he held the position of governor of Khorasan for many years, demonstrating his lasting influence and leadership in the region.

Nuzrat ol-Mulk was the eldest son of Amir Qelich Khan of Teymuri. Nuzrat ol-Mulk married Princess Ashraf us-Sultana Qajar.

Issue includes Amirteymour Kalali and Nosrat Saltaneh.

== See also ==
- Amirteymour Kalali
- Maryam Kalali
- Asadollah Alam
- Mostowfi ol-Mamalek
- Najaf-Qoli Khan Bakhtiari
- Abdol Majid Mirza

== Sources ==
- Āgheli, Bāgher (باقر عاقلی) (1992), Teymourtāsh dar Sahne-ye Siyāsat-e Irān (Persian: تیمورتاش در صحنه سیاست ایران, "Teimurtash in the Political Arena of Iran"), Jāveed: Tehran, 1371 S.H.
- Ansāri, Ali (2003), Modern Iran Since 1921: The Pahlavis and After, Longman: London ISBN 0-582-35685-7.
- Owsati, 'Alireizā (عليرضا اوسطى), Iran in the Past Three Centuries (Irān dar Se Qarn-e Goz̲ashteh, Persian: ايران در سه قرن گذشته), Vol. 1.
- Sheikhol'eslāmi, Javād (جواد شیخ‌الاسلامی) (2000), So'oud va Soghout-e Teymourtāsh ("The Rise and Fall of Teymourtash", Persian: صعود و سقوط تیمورتاش) (Tous: Tehran, 1379 H.S.) ISBN 964-315-500-5.
