= Charles de Ferriol =

French ambassador

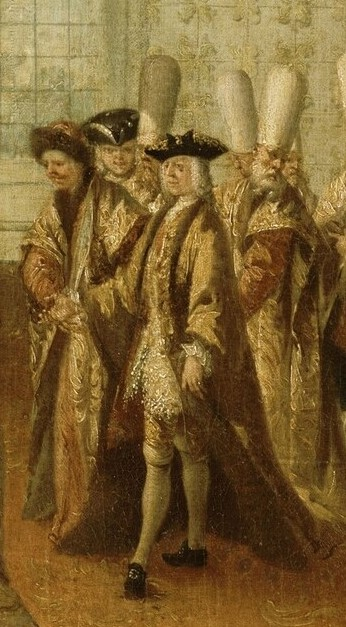
Charles de Ferriol (1652-1722) between 1703 and 1711

Charles de Ferriol (1652–1722) was a French ambassador sent by Louis XIV to the Ottoman Empire from 1692 to 1711, during the rule of Sultan Ahmed III.

A painting by Jean-Baptiste van Mour, who had accompanied him on his mission to Constantinople, shows his reception by the Sultan.

Ferriol is also known as the man who brought to France the epistolary writer Charlotte Aïssé, a Circassian slave he had bought in Constantinople. His alleged attempts to gain sexual favours from her, never confirmed by Aïssé herself, became the subject of numerous books and biographies, notably the Abbé Prévost's Histoire d’une Grecque moderne (1740).

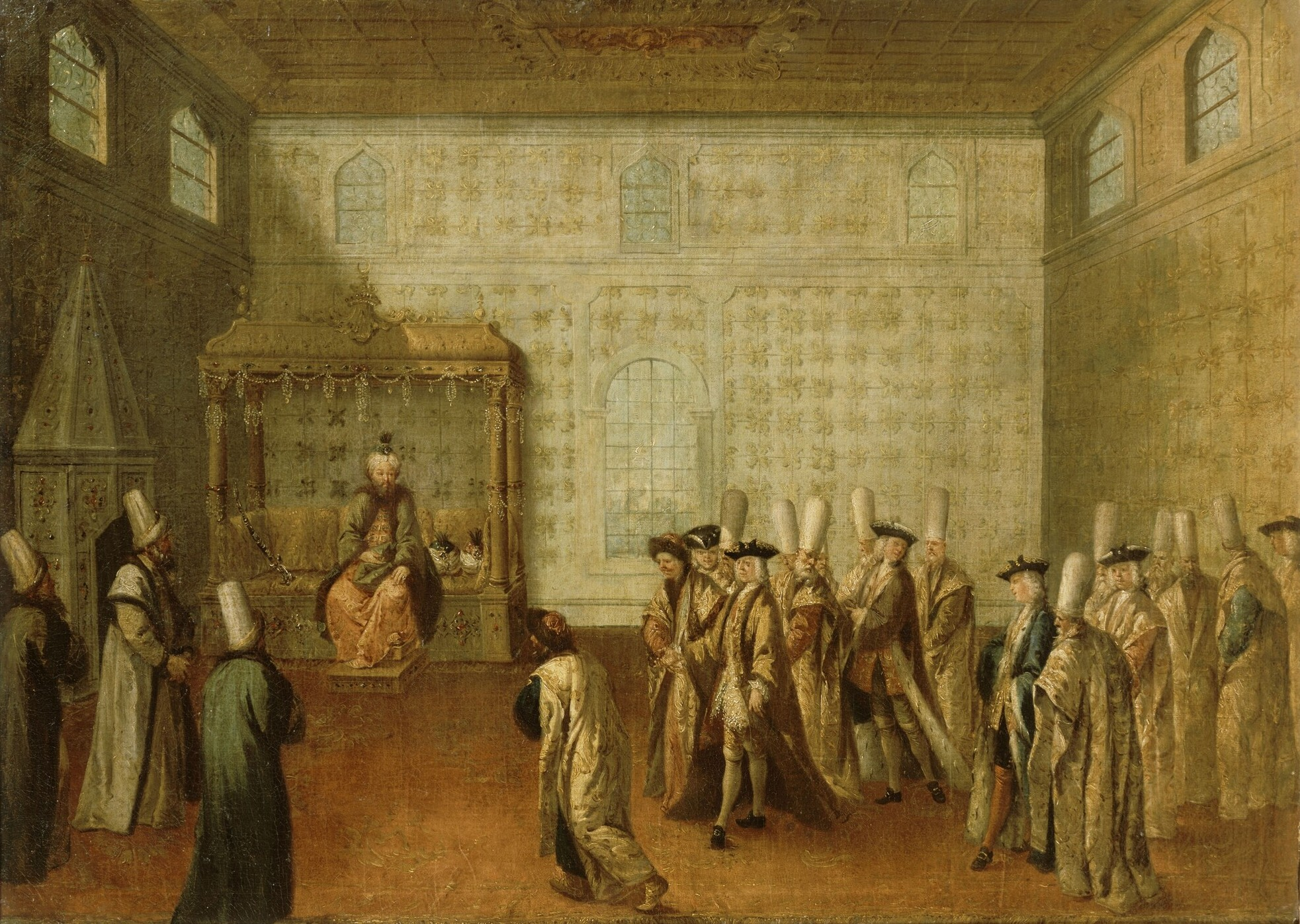
Ahmed III receiving the embassy of Charles de Ferriol (painting by Jean-Baptiste van Mour in 1724).

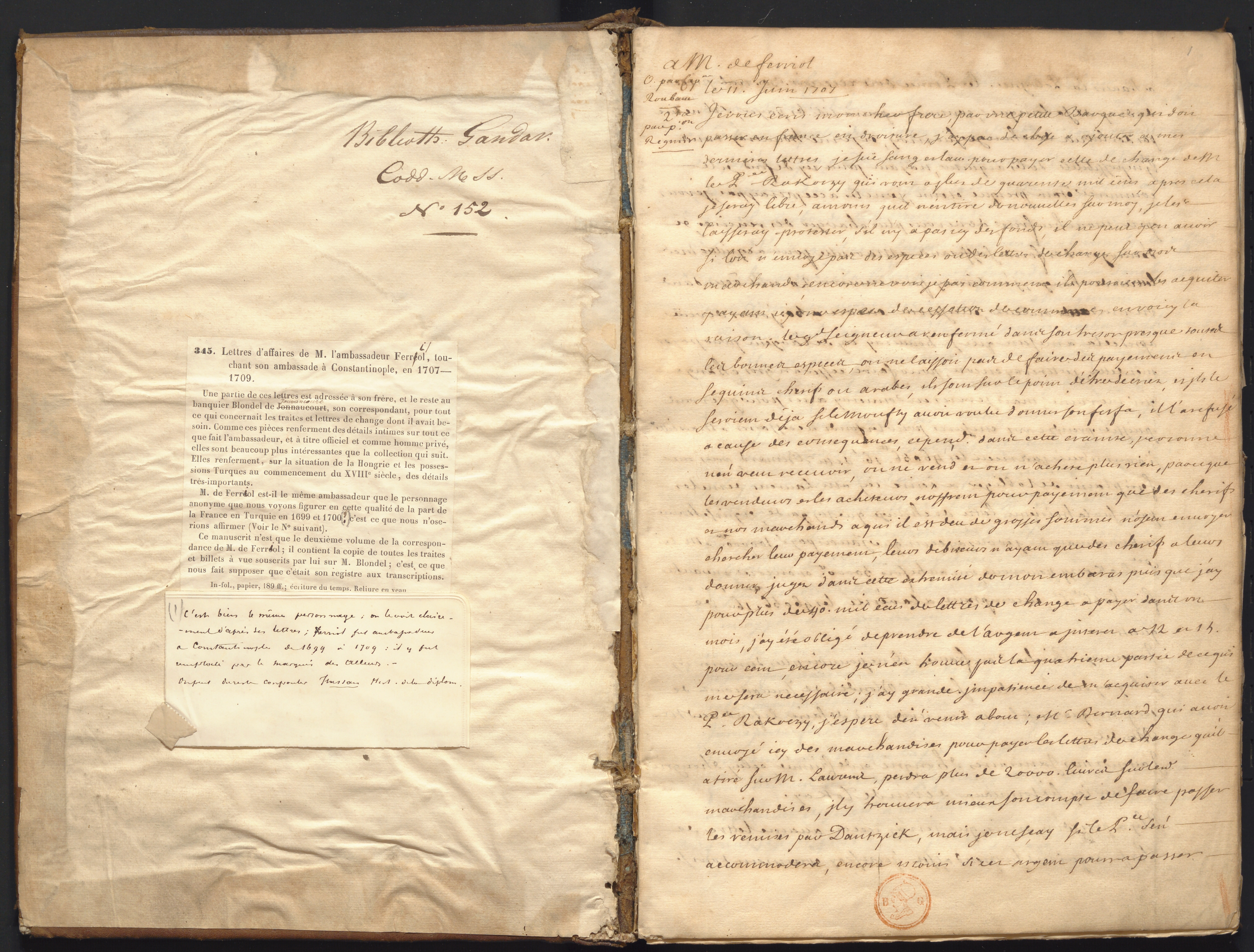
Correspondence of Charles de Ferriol during part of his time as ambassador in Constantinople, 1707-1709

== See also ==
- French Ambassador to the Ottoman Empire
- Franco-Ottoman alliance
