= Amirteymour Kalali =

Iranian statesman and aristocrat (1895–1988)

- امیرتیمور کلالی
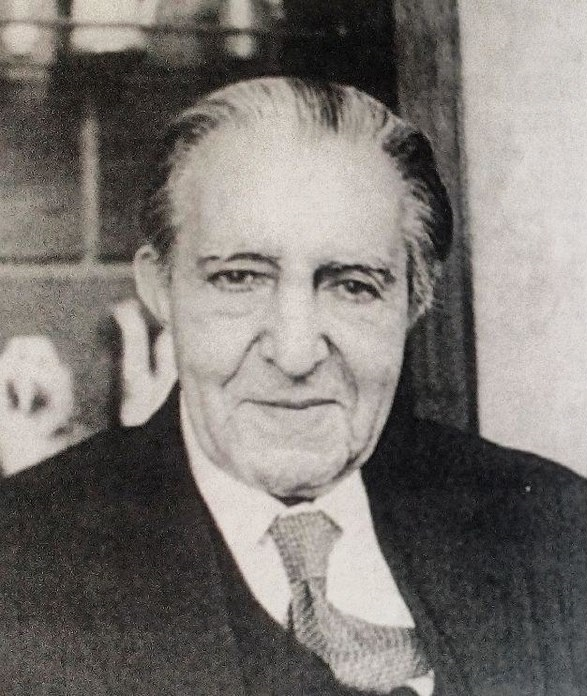

Minister of Interior
- In office 16 December 1951 – 16 July 1952
- Prime Minister: Mohammad Mossadegh
- Preceded by: Fazlollah Zahedi
- Succeeded by: Gholam Hossein Sadighi

Minister of Labour
- In office 9 February 1950 – 27 April 1951
- Prime Minister: Mohammad Mossadegh
- Succeeded by: Ebrahim Alami

Member of the National Consultative Assembly
- In office 6 October 1928 – 10 August 1953
- Constituency: Kashmar

Personal details
- Born: Mohammad Ebrahim Mirza Amirteymour Kalali; 5 October 1894 Mashhad, Sublime State of Persia
- Died: 11 February 1988 (aged 93) Tehran, Iran
- Resting place: Behesht-e Zahra, Tehran
- Spouse(s): Ney Rozma Davalou Qajar (died); Afrouz Farhood
- Children: 11, including Nahid Mirza
- Parent: Nuzrat ol-Molk (father)
- Education: Harrow School; Saint-Cyr

Amirteymour Kalali (Persian: امیرتیمور کلالی; 5 October 1894 – 11 February 1988), also known as Sardar Nosrat, was a prominent Iranian statesman and aristocrat. He served as the minister of interior and minister of labour in the cabinet led by Prime Minister Mohammad Mosaddegh. He was a member of the Parliament of Iran for nine terms.

Habib Ladjevardi published his memoirs in 1997.
