= Guy Hersant =

French photographer (born 1949)

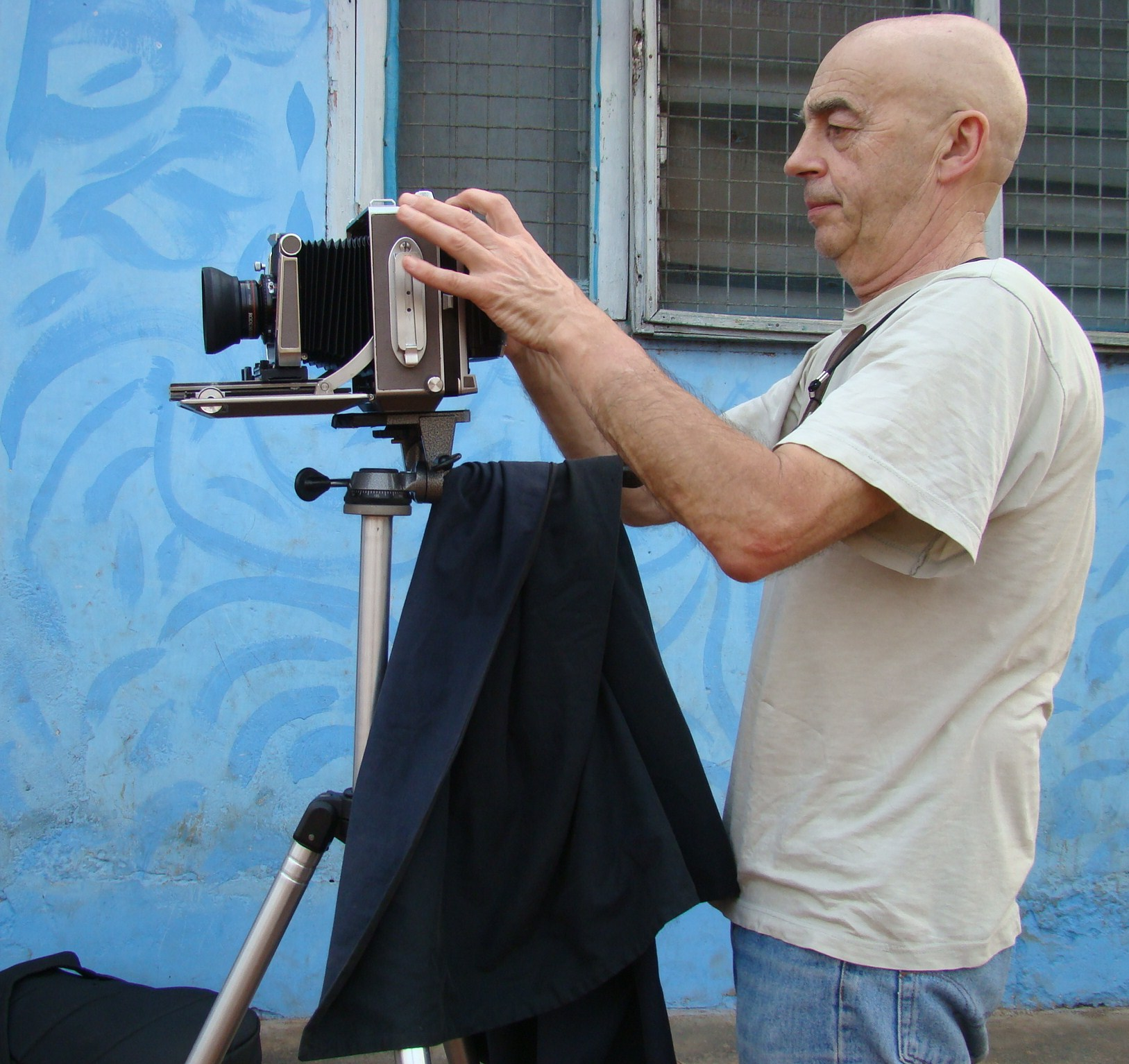
- in Teshie, Ghana. 2010
- Born: 1949 (age 76–77); Loire Atlantique, France
- Known for: Photography

Guy Hersant (born 1949) is a French photographer.

== Biography ==
Born in Loire Atlantique (France), Guy Hersant entered apprenticeship at the age of sixteen and obtained his CAP in photography while working as an assistant for several photographers. He later opened his own studio in Lorient in 1975. There he concentrated on portraits and reporting until 1990.

He went to Africa for the first time in 1971, where he was an assistant in a studio run by a Frenchman in Bamako). It was the beginning of a personal photography, the revelation of the taste for traveling and the passion for Africa.

He co-founded the collective of Brittany photographers "Sellit" in 1979. He created in 1982, and managed until 1989, the meetings of the photography in Brittany, then the gallery Le Lieu in Lorient. Afterward, Guy Hersant settled in Paris and photographed architecture. He travelled again in West Africa and made photographic series of the valleys of the river Niger.

He co-led the African Photography Encounters from 1994 until 2001. He has conducted research, wrote and published on the photography of studio and itinerant photographers in Africa, contributing to awareness of the works of these photographers.

In 1995, he began a series of photos of groups in the forest of Crécy (Somme, France) which began the spirit of the project Please do not move! that began in Kano (Nigeria) on the instigation of the Alliance française of this city in 2000. The project was to develop in the following years in France in Amiens, Le Touquet, Mulhouse; in Libreville (Gabon), Gao (Mali), and in January, 2010 in association with Jean-Michel Rousset and Eric Adjetey Anang in Teshie (Ghana). It is this work which confirmed the vision, at the same time documentary and human, which crossed the whole work of the photographer.

=== Expositions ===
- Nature humaine. Musée de l’Hospice Saint-Roch – Issoudun . October 2007 - April 2008
- Portraits au Gabon. Festival « Les photographiques » - Le Mans . February 2008
- Les hommes sont des acteurs… Théâtre La Passerelle, Scène nationale – Gap . October - December 2007
- Portraits de groupe. Château de Suze-la-Rousse – Drôme . September - December 2007
- J’ai trouvé l’eau si belle. Festival Photo Nature & Paysage – La Gacilly . June–September 2006
- (travail). La Filature, Scène nationale – Mulhouse . January–March 2006
- Please do not move!. Alliance française de Kano (Nigeria) – octobre 2005; Université Rennes2 . April-June2006
- Africa-urbis – exposition collective. Musée des Arts Derniers, Paris - May–September 2005
- Tout le monde. Musée du Touquet (Pas de Calais) - March–June 2005
- Kan be soni. (Avec G.Clariana, Th.Corroyer, O.Dumbia, M.Sanogo, S.M.Sidibé), École Supérieure d’Art et de design, Amiens, avril 2002; Institut national des arts Bamako (Mali), October 2001
- Les routes du fleuve. La Bibliothèque - Saint-Herblain, 1999; Université de Picardie, Amiens, September 2001
- Un itinéraire africain : 1971-2000. Aubenas - July 2001
- In Lagos. Galerie Auteurs, Paris 14e, March 2000; Alliance Française de Lagos (Nigeria) - November 2000
- Harar. Musée Rimbaud, Charleville-Mézières - November 1999-February 2000
- Champs, agriculture dans l’Aisne. Maison des Arts Laon, June–September 1999
- La photographie à Grignan, Grignan, 1995
- L’Africaine. Rencontres Photographiques en Bretagne, Lorient, 1991; Carré Amelot, La Rochelle, 1993; l’Atelier, Paris, 1993
- Vigo VI. Commande Ville de Vigo, 2e Fotobienal, Vigo, (Spain) 1986
- Itinérance. Galerie nationale, Dakar (Senegal) 1984
- Vous avez dit rural ? (avec M. Massi, H. Bramberger, M. Garanger), B.P.I. du Centre Pompidou, Paris, 1983
- Voyages à Ouessant. Musée des Arts décoratifs, Nantes, 1979
- Vu en Chine. (avec F. Huguier, F. Lochon, F. Saur), B.P.I. du Centre Pompidou, Paris, 1979

=== Editions ===
- Nature humaine. 40 colour photographies, text Pascal Mougin . Editions du Musée de l’Hospice Saint–Roch. Issoudun 2007
- Tout le monde. 45 colour photographies, comments by Laurence Perrigault, Editions Filigranes 2005
- Please do not move ! in Kano. 23 colour photographies, poems by Sam Cambio, Editions Filigranes, 2005.
- Harar. 19 black & white photographies, text by Bernard Noël, Editions Filigranes, 1999.
- Champs. 65 colour and black & white photographies, text by Guy Marival, preface Bernard Noël, Editions Filigranes, 1999.
- L’Africaine. 13 black & white photographies, text by Ch. Jacob . Editions Filigranes 1993
- La Chine quotidienne. 70 black & white photographies, text by R. Trottignon, preface E. Manac’h, Editions Leoreca, 1979.

=== Films ===
- Guragu, DVD movie on street disabled people in Lagos (Nigeria). 18 minutes, July 2001
- Photographes guinéens, video, 8 minutes 30 seconds, Maison européenne de la photographie, 1994.

=== Public collections ===
- FRAC Bretagne, Rennes
- Galerie Le Lieu, Lorient
- Bibliothèque nationale de France, Paris
- Bibliothèque de Documentation Internationale Contemporaine, Paris
- Bibliothèque Historique de la Ville de Paris, Paris
- Le Ring – artothèque, Nantes
- Musée de Bretagne, Rennes

=== Published texts and conversations ===
- Le Photographe doit être gai Malick Sidibé, Editions Filigranes and Afriphoto, 2005.
- AFRICA URBIS O.Sultan, catalogue, Editions Sepia - 2005
- Studio Malick, Catalogue Les Afriques, Editions Autrement, Paris, 2004.
- Preface for Photographes ambulants, Editions Filigranes et Afriphoto, 2004.
- Preface for Gabriel Fasunon, Editions Filigranes and Afriphoto, 2004.
- A vignette from Lomé : the street photographers’blues, Visual Anthropology, Photographies and modernities in Africa volume XIV, number 3, Harwood publishers academic, 2001
- Interview of Emma Sudour, for "Voir" les photographies, n°9, February 2001
- Lomé, le blues des photographes ambulants, Africultures, July 2001
- Au temps de Sékou Touré; Portraits peints d’Addis Ababa, in Anthologie de la photographie africaine, Editions Revue Noire, Paris, 1998, Prix Nadar 1999.
- Anthologie de la photographie africaine, Editions Revue Noire, 1998
- Entretien avec Brigitte Ollier, Libération, 17 October 1997
- 36 ans de photographies en Guinée, Le Photographe, December 1994 – January 1995
- Images de Conakry, Jeune Afrique, September 1994

=== Workshops ===
- Workshop with the students of Collège Alan Seeger, Vailly-sur-Aisne 2007 /2008
- Workshop in Ecole des Beaux-Arts «Le Quai », Mulhouse – December 2005
- Intervention on architecture and urban landscapes photography at Ecole des Beaux-arts de Paris – February 2004 – October 2004
- Artistice residence in Le Touquet : one week workshop with adolescents – February 2004
- Les photographes ambulants au Togo, Bénin, Ghana et Nigeria, supported by Afrique en Créations / AFAA, 20 September to 16 November 1999
- Autour de la Bibliothèque de France, with students in second year at Ecole Nationale Supérieure des Arts Décoratifs de Paris, 1993-1994.
- Photographies négociées at Club Méditerranée of Cefalu (Sicilia), 1985.

=== Curator of exhibitions ===
2004

- Malick Sidibé and other photographers from Mali : Vive la COPHOTEX, la Filature, Ecole des Beaux-arts, Le Quai and Musée d’Impression sur Etoffe in Mulhouse.

2001

- Les photographes ambulants au Ghana, Nigeria, Togo et Benin.
- Gabriel Fasunon photographe de studio au Nigeria.
- Artistic direction and co-ordination of KAN BE SONI with photographers from Mali and France. Amiens.

1998

- Boxing Ghana. photographies from the archives of Ghanaian Ministry of Information on boxing, a mythic sport in Ghana during the 60s and 70s, and on the boxing studios in Accra by Francis Provençal, a young Ghanaian photographer.

1996

- Photographes ambulants in Addis Ababa ( Ethiopia).
- Portraits de studio coloriés in Addis Ababa.
- Les photographes de presse à Nairobi (Kenya).

1994

- Syli Photo: Sékou Touré photo service in the first years of Guinea independence.
