= Sam Cambio =

French reporter and author

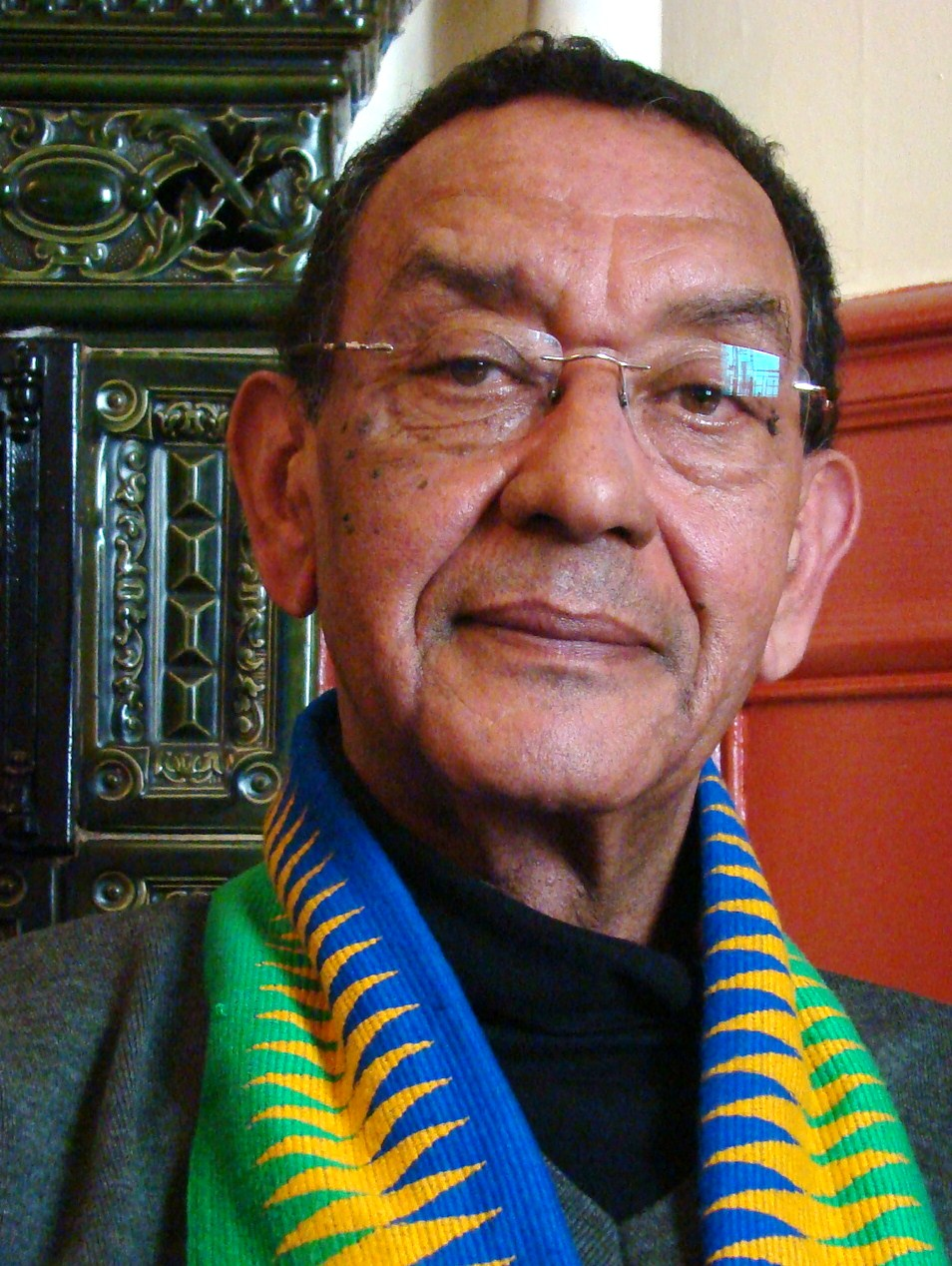
- Cambio in Paris. 2010
- Born: May 28, 1946 (age 80)
- Known for: poetry; journalism

Sam Cambio (born as Jacques Bianco) is a reporter and an author born in 1946 in Marseille.

== Biography ==
Self-taught, "son of himself", he arose from unknown father and was abandoned by his mother at the age of three. He was raised by his grandparents of Italian origin, Rose and Félix Bellocchia in the countryside of Marseille. His grandfather, a docker, was decorated with the medal of honour of the work of the Autonomous Port of Marseille. This childhood fed the creativity of Sam Cambio and gave birth to the poem Identity.

Sam Cambio was a trainee of the IESA, Paris (Institute of higher education for the Arts), he also did a training course in the jobs of television within the framework of the INA (Institut national de l'audiovisuel), with Patrick Clement as director of training. He worked for daily paper Libération (director Serge July) from 1973 till 1978, and from 1989 till 1990 as well, as for the monthly magazine Actuel from 1991 till 1992 (director Jean-François Bizot).

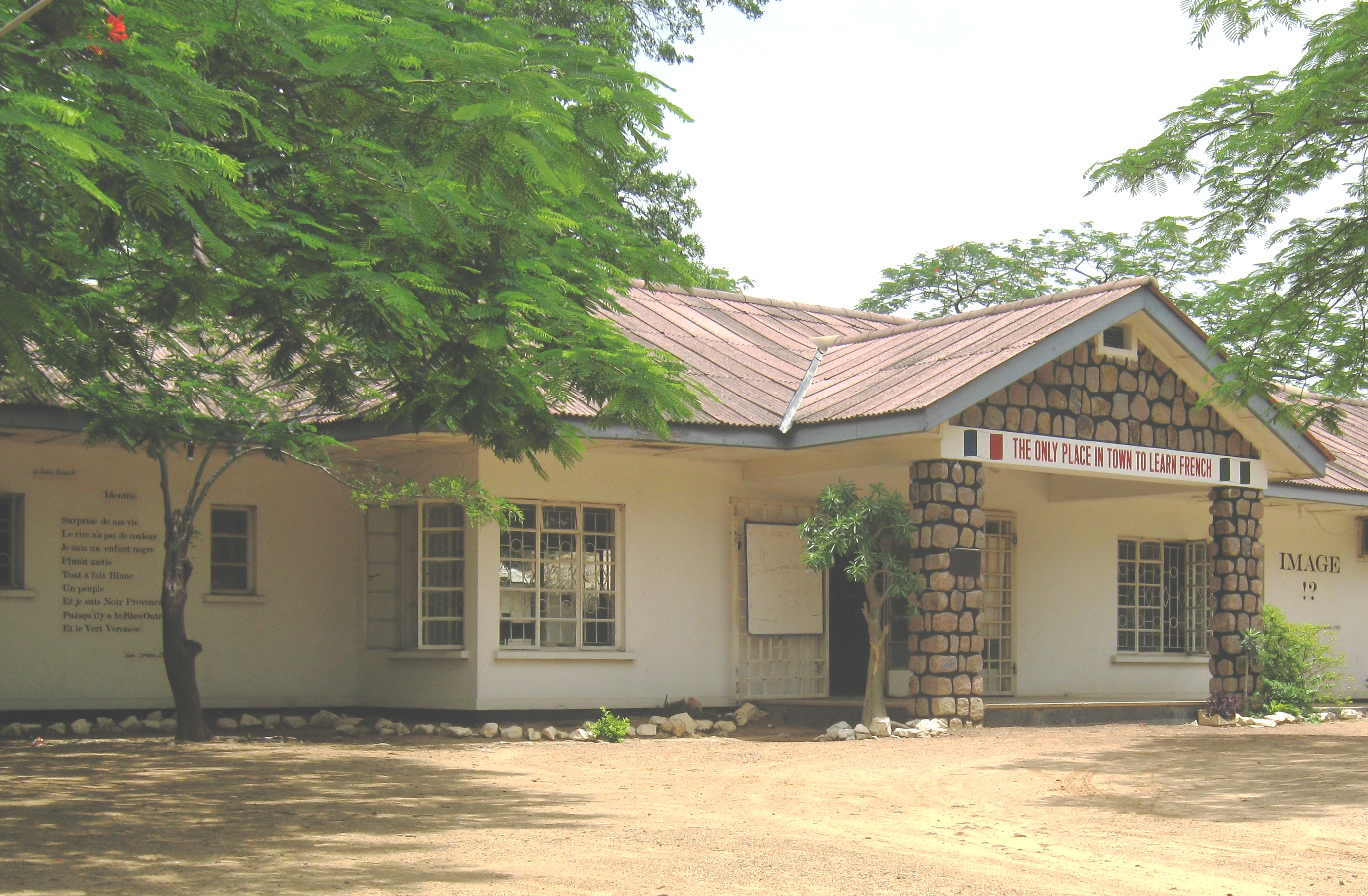
View of Alliance française in Kano, Nigeria, with Identité and Image!?, poems by Sam Cambio

He is the author of numerous articles on social phenomena, one of which — "these dealers of the sun who tamper underground" — was quoted in the review of Ivan Levaï on France Inter. He wrote numerous poems, among them "Revolution", "Identity" (reproduced on the facade of the Alliance française of Kano, this poem is also in motto of the editorial of Régine Cuzin, curator of the exhibition of contemporary art Latitudes 2009), "Image!?" and did interviews of visual artists, writes The fractal Tom Thumb on Georges Adeagbo. In 2008 he composed the texts of artist's book Cantata, realized with Nathalie Leroy-Fiévée, painter.

In 1985, he wrote the article "To the thief!", illustrated by Robert Doisneau's photos, published in Journ'hall for the inauguration of the Grande Halle de la Villette and Paris Biennale.

Sam Cambio drafted scenarios On the Road of the Slave, Km 150, The Blue Line of Vosges (with Patrick Deval), On the track of Addi Ba (with Catherine Foussadier and François Rossini), The Blue Line of Vosges.

In 1994, he was the initiator of the itinerant exhibition of contemporary art The Road of the art on the Road of the slave, curated by Régine Cuzin, inaugurated on 18 June 1994 in Royal Saltworks at Arc-et-Senans before being presented in Brazil and in the Caribbean and sinking into the Atlantic Ocean.

While living for three months in Nigeria in 2000, Cambio led workshops of poetic writing for adults and children organized by the Alliance française of Kano and Luc Lagouche (then teaching in the French school of Kano) as well as The Alliance française and the French Cultural Center of Lagos. He co-authored with the photographer Guy Hersant Please do not move, work presented at Rennes university in 2006. He was at the origin of the exhibition of poetry for the Alliance française of Kano "Image!?" Presence, a collection of poems inspired by his stay in Nigeria, was published at the end of the residence.

In 2010, Sam Cambio was invited in Montpellier by the gallery AL/MA and Méridianes publishers for the exhibition of Nathalie Leroy-Fiévée. A work of this artist, used as an illustration for Biographies, is featured. He has written poems dedicated to several artists and their work. "Ghana" is one of them, as a tribute to Eric Adjetey Anang that was part of the scenography of this artist's performance in 2011 at the museum of world funeral art, Novosibirsk, and Gwangju Design Biennale after translation in Russian and Korean languages.

On 1 March 2011, the library of Musée d'Art Moderne de la Ville de Paris includes Ces oeuvres et moi in its collection.

In August 2013, his poem "Ghana" is reproduced on a large scale and integrated to the scenography of Eric Adjetey Anang's exhibition during Images - Occupy Utopia festival in Copenhagen.

June 2014: exhibitions Mes Géographies at Musée d'art moderne de la ville de Paris and Une tache de sang noir dans la lavande at gallery Ygrec, invited by École nationale supérieure d'arts de Paris-Cergy.

February 2015: two months residency in Kenya, where Sam cambio works with Alliances françaises of Nairobi and Mombasa, University of Nairobi and Kenyatta University, as well as Lycée Denis Diderot (French school of Nairobi). Two booklets were published.

Still in 2015, the French artist Stéphanie Radenac, inventor of emotional design, creates a piece with Gourmet-Gourmand, a poem by Sam Cambio.
