= Alliance Française de Silicon Valley =

Non-profit organization

- Founded: May 1970
- Founder: Noble Tucker
- Type: French cultural and language center
- Location: 14107 Winchester Blvd suite t, Los Gatos, CA 95032, United States
- Coordinates: 37.262508392334°N 121.96227264404°W
- Region served: Los Gatos, Menlo Park, San Jose, Santa Cruz
- Product: French cultural and language education
- President: Upi Struzak
- Director: Florence Thomas
- Parent organization: Fondation Alliance Française
- Website: www.afscv.org

Alliance Française Silicon Valley (AFSCV), is a non-profit organization from Silicon Valley, part of the franchise Alliance Française, which promotes the knowledge and appreciation of French and francophone cultures, encouraging the interaction among French, Francophone, and American people in the Bay Area through programs in education and the arts.

They have two centers, located in Los Gatos and Palo Alto, California, bringing their services to the Santa Clara, San Mateo and Santa Cruz counties. Their main office, foyer, and library are located at the Los Gatos center.

== History ==
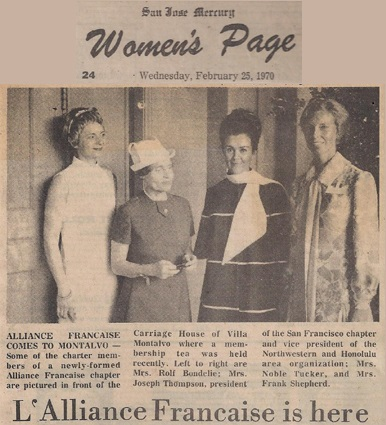
AFSCV Founder

Alliance Française Silicon Valley was created in 1970 in Saratoga by Mrs. Noble Tucker, under the name “Alliance Française of Saratoga.” It later became the “Alliance Française of Santa Clara Valley.” In 2013, it changed its name again to “Alliance Française Silicon Valley” to be easier to find.

== Activities and Services ==
=== Language Classes ===
AFSCV offers French lessons, grouping students by age, and bolsters its academic program with festive activities all year round.

The institution evaluates the oral and writing skills by the Common European Framework of Reference for Languages (CEFR).

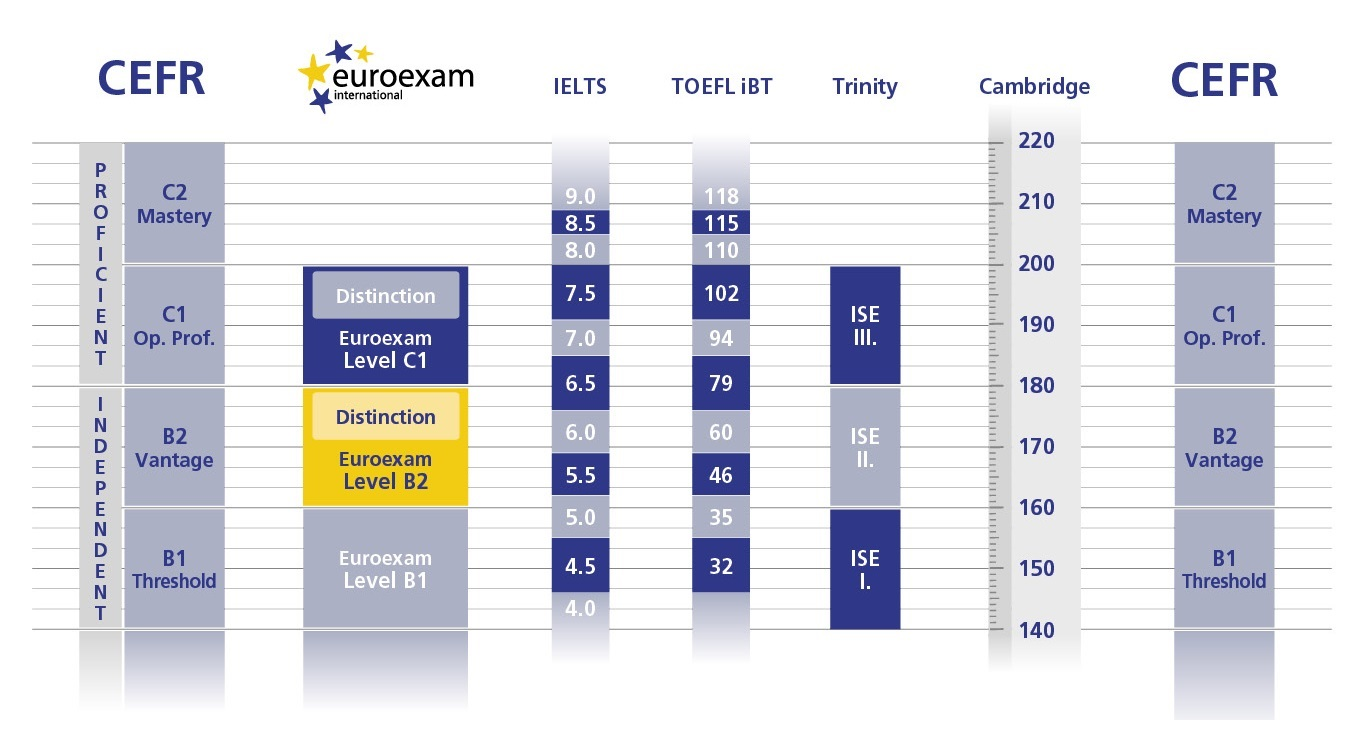
Partial CEFR schema

=== Cultural Events ===
The French alliance promotes the integration of French culture through exhibitions, Ciné-Club film screenings, appreciation of Francophone music, exhibition of works of art, performing arts, book club, special events according to ephemeris, free language practice through French Express, among others.

In February 2019, the AFSCV and the French Consulate in San Francisco presented an exhibition called "Pulsions," highlighting the work of eight French artists.

Past events have included a history of red soled shoes from Louis XIV to Christian Louboutin, a workshop on French Polynesia, Bastille Day, and others.

=== Approaches towards the COVID-19 pandemic ===
During the coronavirus pandemic, the Alliance Française chapters moved their French classes and events online. Online events and workshops included a series on hygiene put on by a historian at the Louvre; a discussion of the Netflix series Emily in Paris; art workshops around portraits, Pop Art and contemporary art and many others. The 44 online events offered in 2020 were seen by participants all over the U.S. and Europe, including France, Holland, the Netherlands, Belgium and the U.K.
