= Alliance Française de Lagos =

- Founded: 1959
- Type: French cultural and language center
- Location: Mike Adenuga Centre, 9 Osborne Road, Ikoyi, Lagos
- Region served: Lagos State
- Product: French cultural and language education
- Website: afnigeria.org

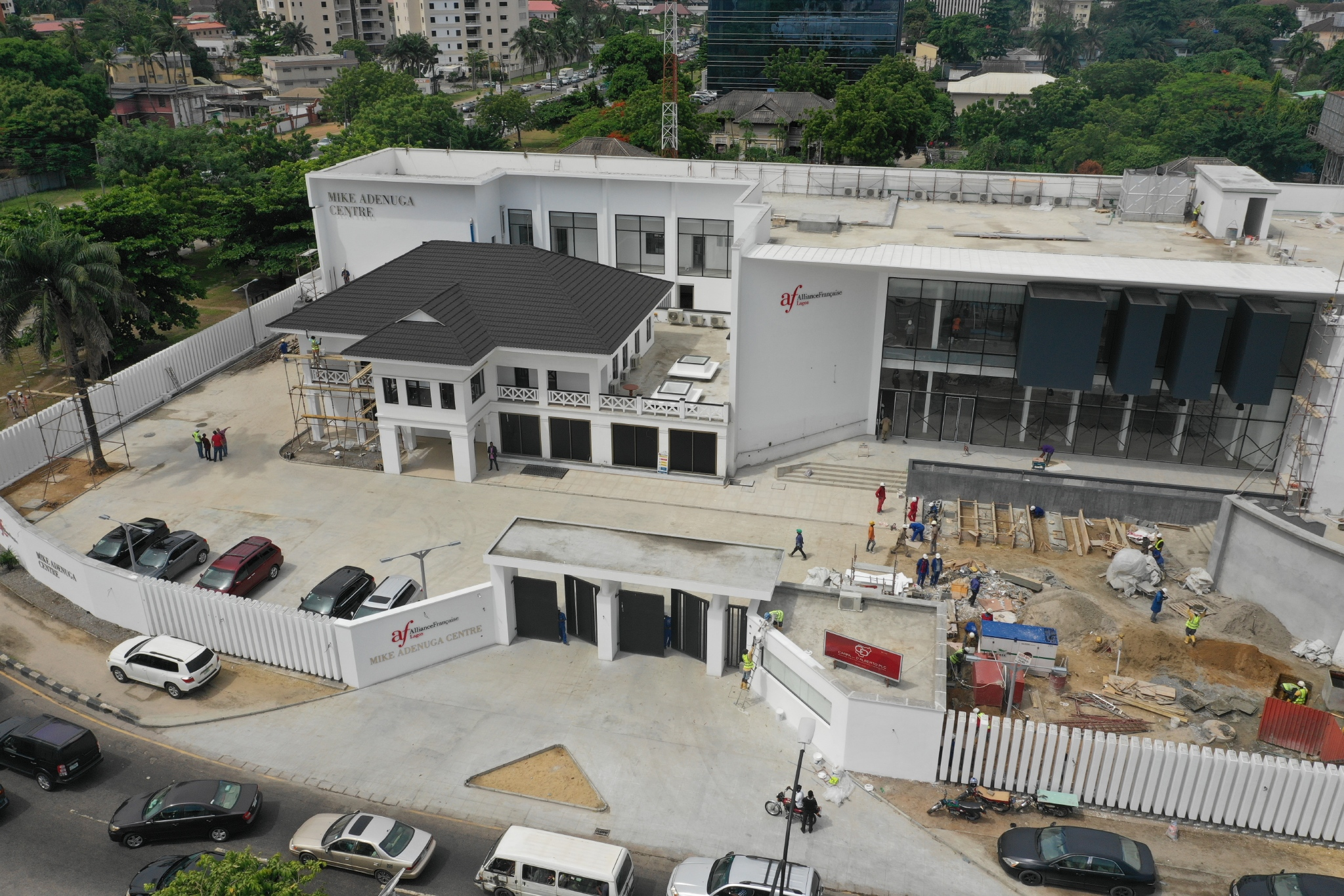
Building of the new center

The Alliance Française of Lagos (French: l'Alliance Française de Lagos) is a Nigerian non-profit institution in Lagos whose statutes have been approved by the Alliance Française of Paris. The institute is involved with the training and education of Nigerians, most especially Lagosians in the French language and host cultural events.

== History ==
The Institution was established in 1959. About 4,000 students register annually at the Institute for their programmes. There are ten sister locations in other parts of Nigeria including Enugu, Ibadan, Ilorin, Jos, Kano, Kaduna, Lagos, Maiduguri, Owerri and Port Harcourt. The Af Lagos is one of the largest Alliances in Africa. As one of the worldwide networks of Alliances, it works closely with the Foundation des Alliances Françaises in Paris. As the operator leading to the promotion of French language and culture, it is supported by the French Ministry of Foreign Affairs.

The seat of Alliance Française de Lagos was in Ikoyi before moving to Yaba in the 1990s.

== The new Alliance Française de Lagos, Mike Adenuga Centre ==
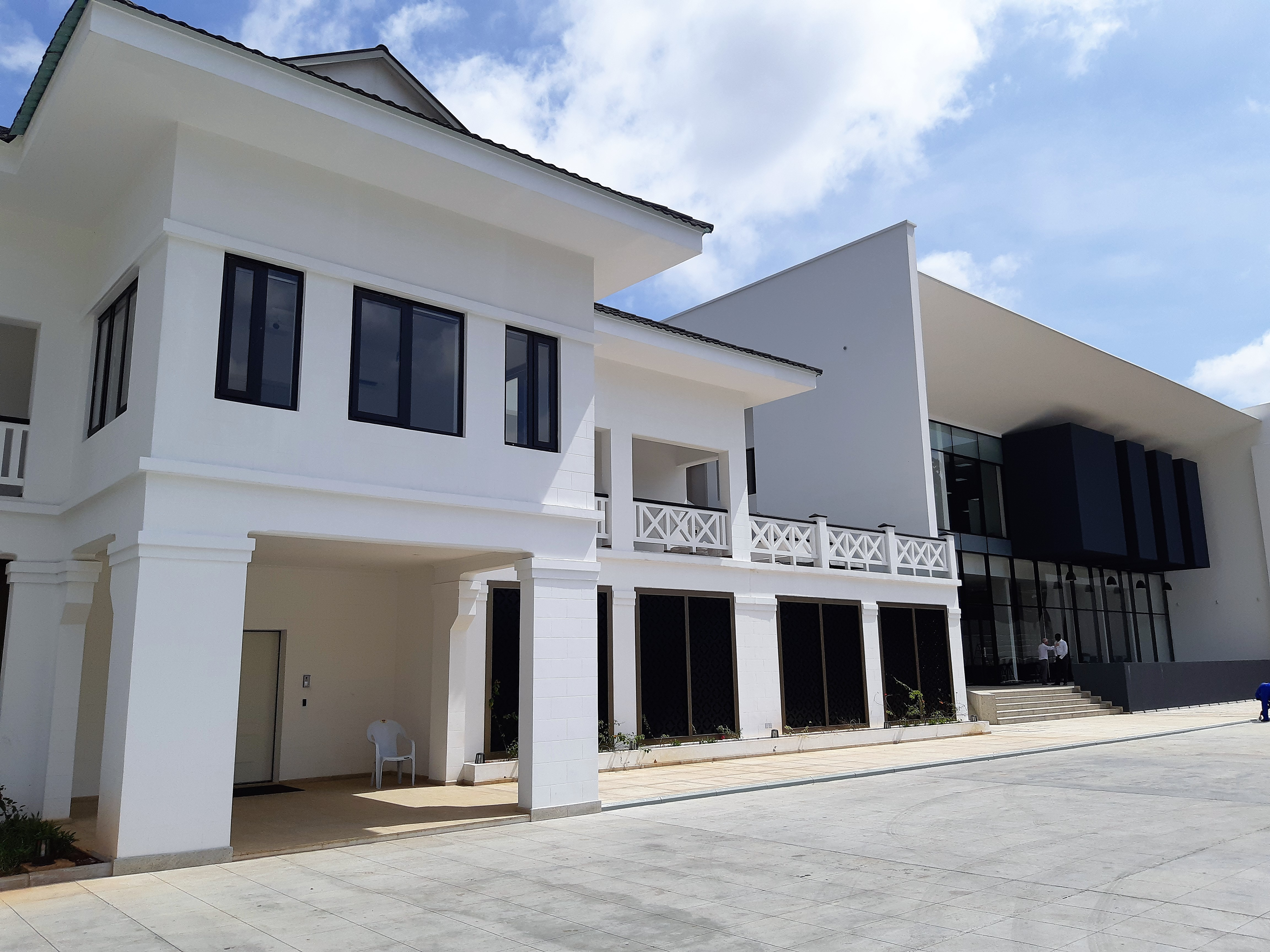
One of the nicest buildings in Lagos, fusion of an old villa and a very modern building

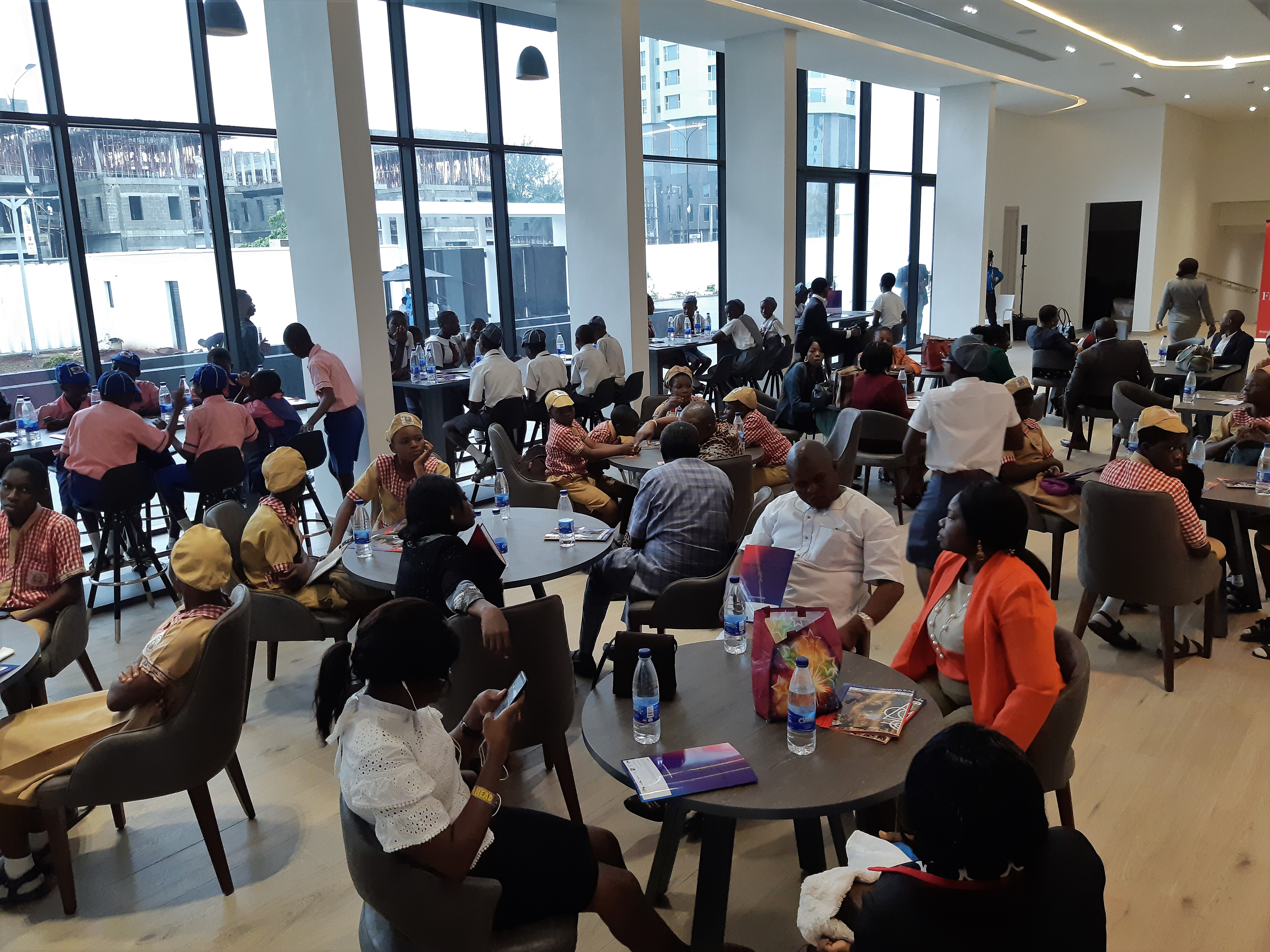
The restaurant, Eric Kayser

The seat moved from Yaba back to Ikoyi in 2019, thanks to the exceptional support of Dr Mike Adenuga who decided to build a brand new cultural and linguistic centre. The French President Emmanuel Macron inaugurated the first part of the project during his successful visit in Lagos in July 2018 and the centre was fully opened in May 2019. The project, drawn by Baron Architecture, was followed by the sponsor's daughter herself, Ms Bella Disu and the director of Alliance Française de Lagos, Charles Courdent. It is considered as an architectural masterpiece, one of the nicest buildings in Lagos, and an exceptional cultural Centre, including an auditorium, library, art gallery, outdoor amphitheater etc. The "franchise" Eric Kayser, French restaurant and bakery, can also be found in the Mike Adenuga Centre.

== Cultural Events ==
The Alliance Française de Lagos has been hosting major events and festivals (dance, cinema, photography -LagosPhoto-, literature -Ake-, music, theatre etc.) since its opening in 2019.

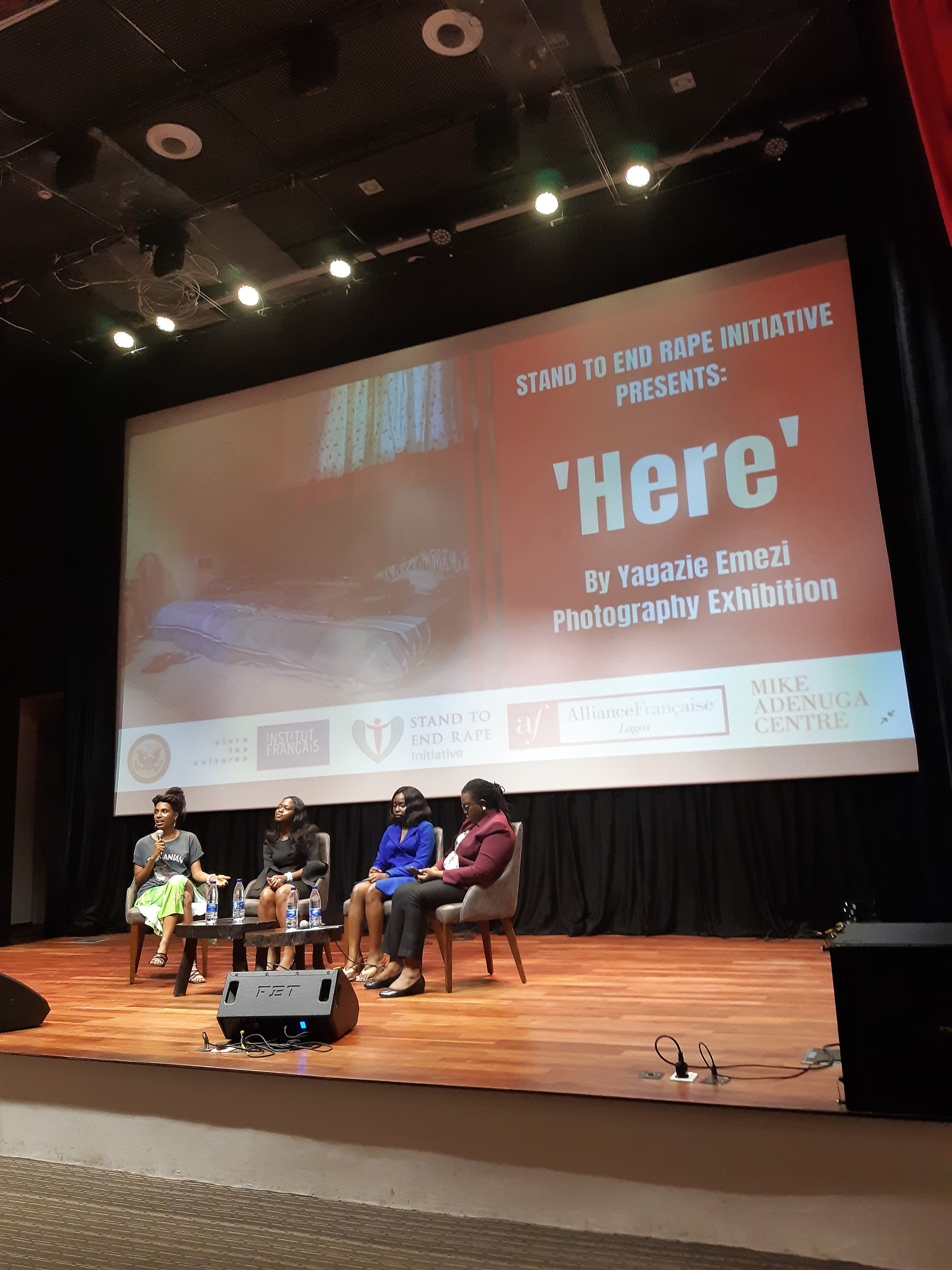
Auditorium

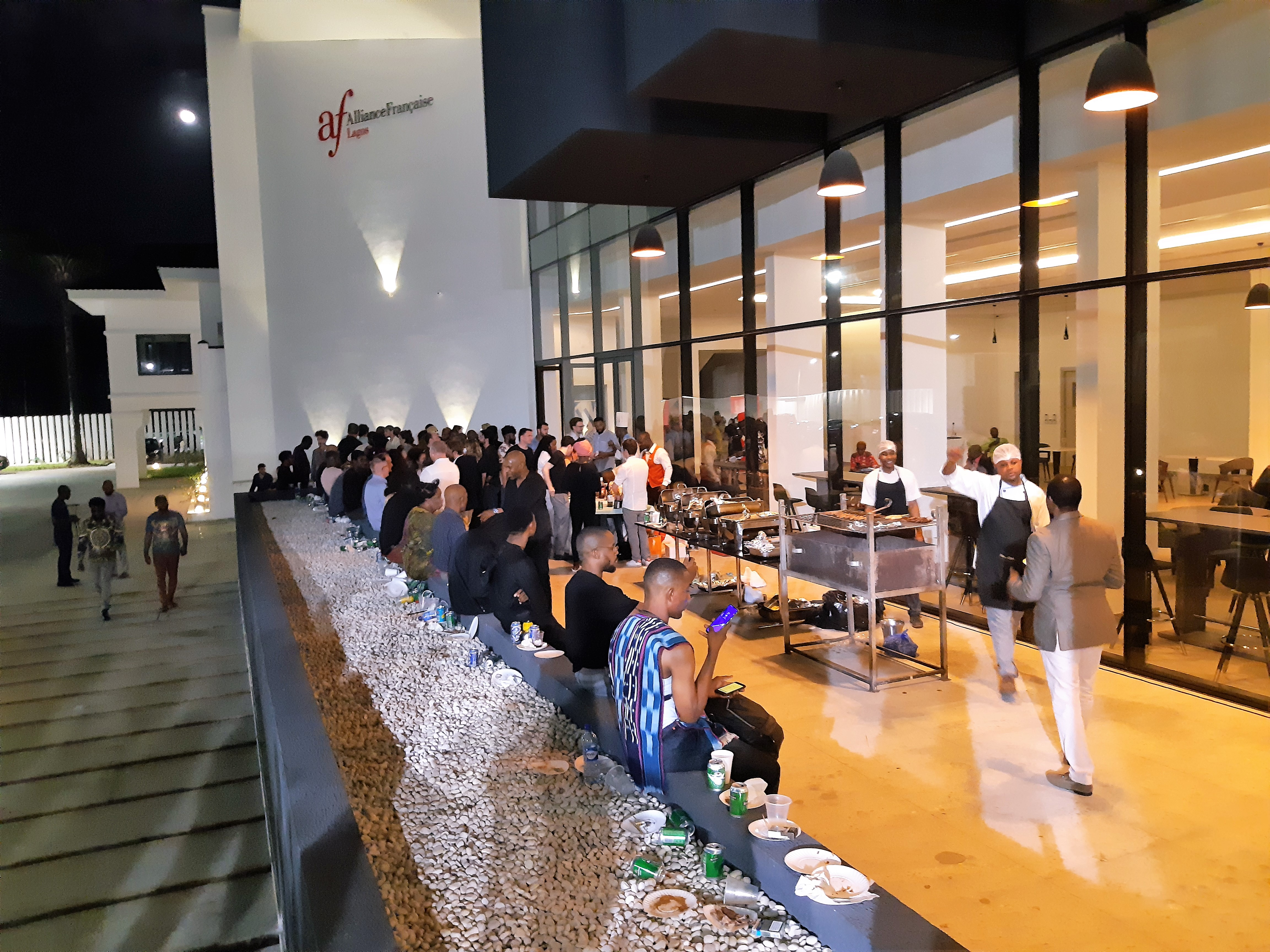

== See also ==
- Alliance Française
