= Alliance Française of Port Elizabeth =

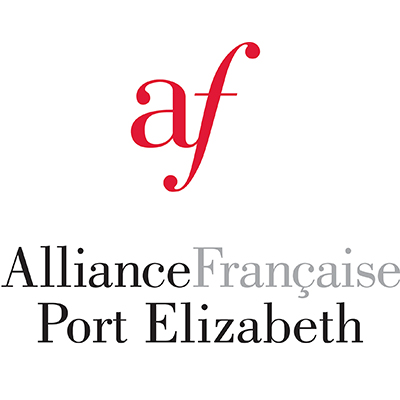
- Founded: 1960
- Type: Nonprofit
- Location: Mackay Street, Gqeberha, South Africa
- Key people: André Crozier (President, 2021–); Guillaume Favier Nirere (Director, 2021–)
- Website: www.afportelizabeth.com

The Alliance Française of Port Elizabeth is a South African non-profit organisation in the city of Gqeberha, supported by the French Embassy in South Africa.

== History ==
The team is composed of a committee of around 10 members, a director appointed by the French Embassy, staff, and teachers.

The Alliance occupies a Victorian-style house on the historic site of Richmond Hill. It has three classrooms, a café, a gallery and a library. South Africa's former Prime Minister and later President, John Vorster, was once a border guard in the house. He was an attorney in Gqeberha prior to his detention in the Baakens Street police station for his Ossewabrandwag organisation activities.

The Alliance is primarily a language school and a French consular agency. In addition to French classes and Xhosa classes, they organise monthly socio-cultural activities.

== Official Diplomas ==
DELF (Diplôme d'etudes en langue française) and DALF (Diplôme approfondi de langue française) are official qualifications delivered by the French Department of Education to certify the competencies of non-French native speakers in the French language.

DELF and DALF qualifications are internationally recognised; they are consistent with international standards for test development and the Common European Framework of Reference for Languages. The DELF and DALF consist of six levels, each independently recognised as a diploma. Candidates can choose their examination according to their level. They may also sit the examinations for more than one diploma during the same examination session.
