= Eric Adjetey Anang =

Ghanaian sculptor (born 1985)

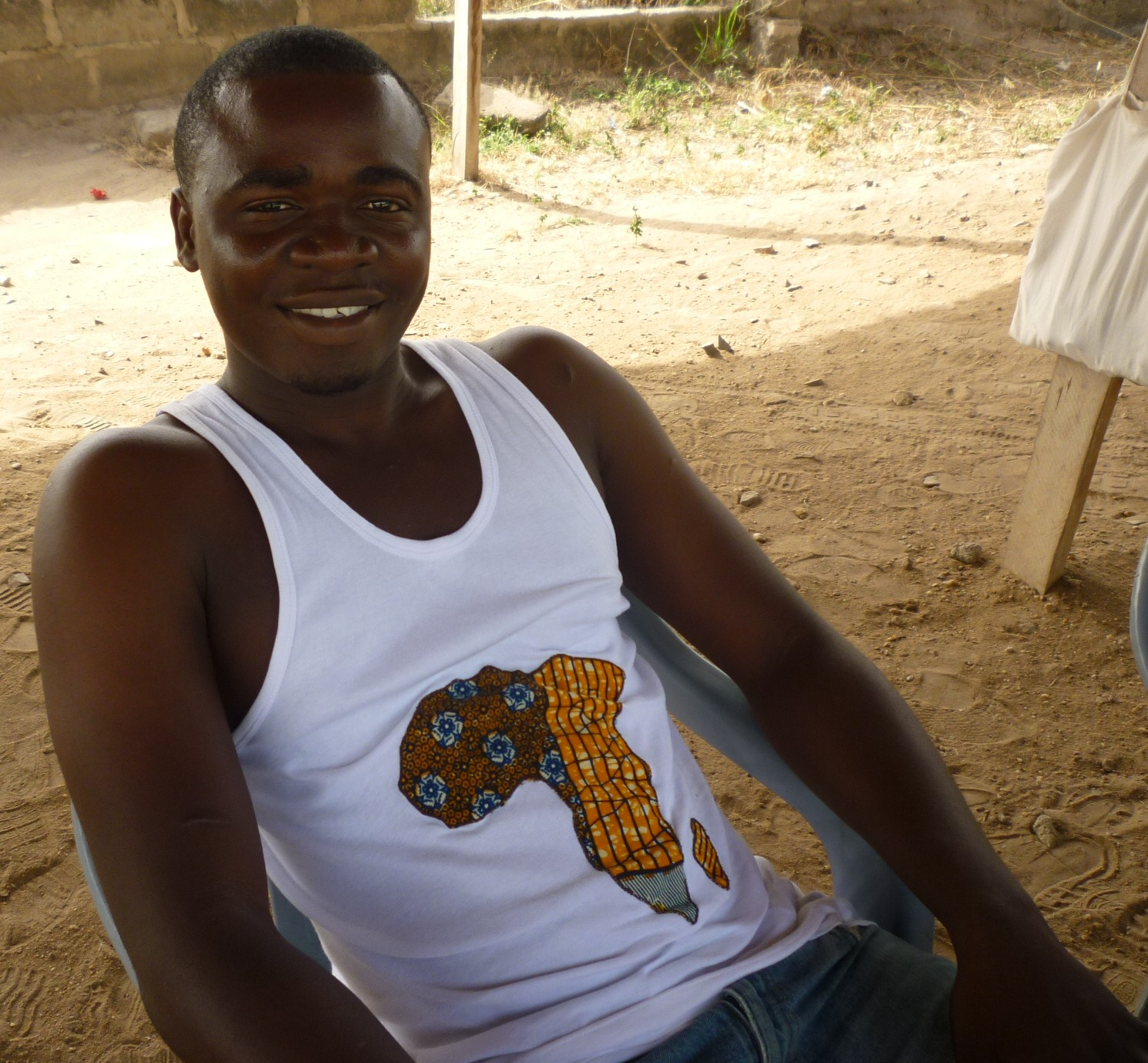
- in Kane Kwei Carpentry Workshop Teshie, 2009 (5.587742°N 0.099610°W)
- Born: Teshie, Accra
- Known for: Sculpture, design
- Website: http://kanekwei.com

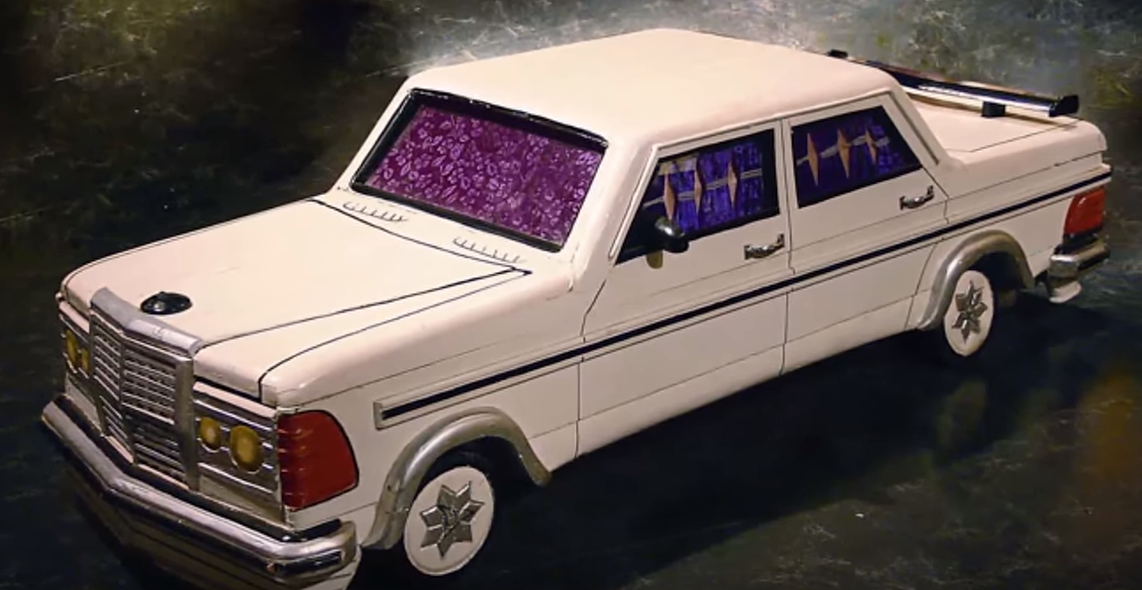
Limo coffin, by Eric Adjetey Anang, 2014

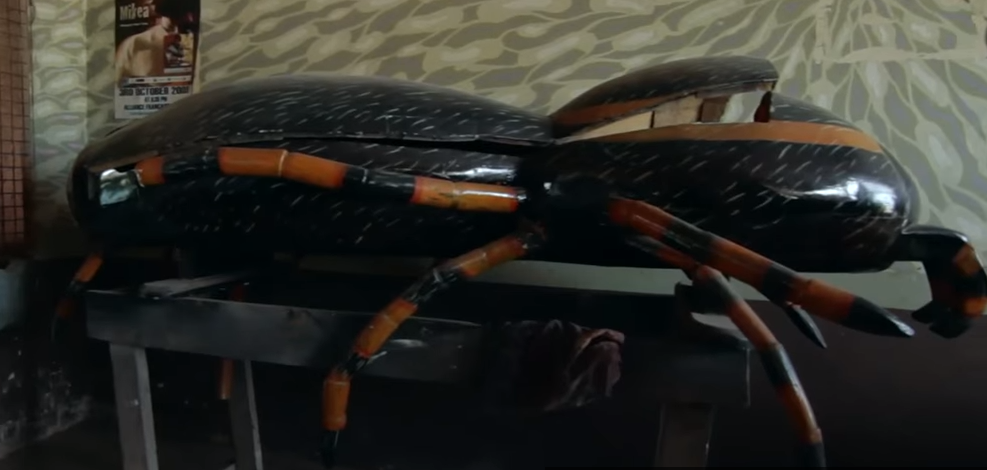
Spider Coffin, Eric Adjetey Anang

Eric Adjetey Anang is a Ghanaian sculptor and fantasy coffin carpenter. He was born in Teshie, Ghana and runs the Kane Kwei Carpentry Workshop. He currently maintains dual residency and splits his time between Ghana and Madison, Wisconsin, where he is pursuing unique projects.

== Early life and education ==
In 2001, he introduced Ghana design coffins at Gidan Makama Museum Kano, Nigeria, under the auspices of Alliance française in Kano. He completed his secondary school at the Accra Academy.

== Career ==
=== Kane Kwei Carpentry Workshop ===
Adjetey Anang explained in an interview that the fantasy coffin idea began when his grandfather was building a palanquin for a chief, but the chief died before he could ride in it and the family decided he should instead be buried in it.

In 2005 he took over the management of the studio that was established by Seth Kane Kwei, motivated by the ambition to "rise the name of his grand-father and see the world". Within a short time, Adjetey Anang became one of Ghana's leading contemporary artists and an internationally known coffin maker.

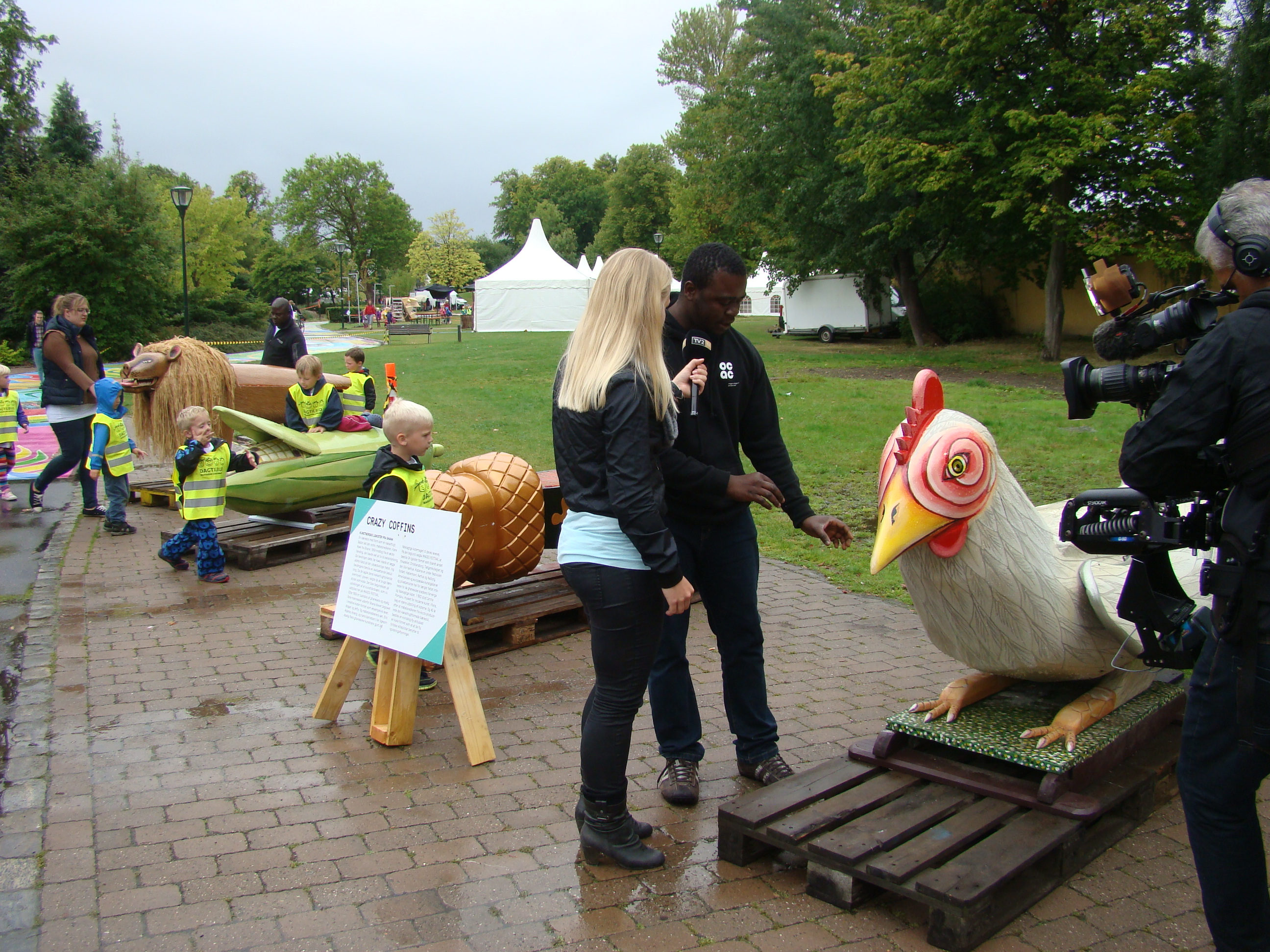
Eric Adjetey Anang during an interview for Danish TV. He is commenting on coffins commissioned for Images Festival 2013.

In January 2010, Adjetey Anang took part in the photographic project Please, do not move ! with the French photographer Guy Hersant. At the end of the same year, he was invited to the Black World Festival in Dakar as representative of designers from Ghana.

=== Art in the United States ===
In 2009, Adjetey Anang organized for Oregon College of Art & Craft's Senior Lecturer Michael de Forest to come to Ghana for a two-month artist residency.

At the 2019 Furniture Society Conference held at the Milwaukee Institute of Art and Design, Adjetey Anang and Michael de Forest were conference speakers and gave a presentation titled "Research as Adventure: Scratching the Itch of Curiosity Until It Smacks You in the Face". Adjetey Anang also gave coffin-making demonstrations showing the process of using hand tools to make hollow, curved, wooden sculptures.

Adjetey Anang has participated in dozen of artist residencies and workshops worldwide. In 2014, he was a Resident Fellow through the Windgate ITE International Residency at the Center for Art in Wood in Philadelphia, PA. He is the 2019-2020 Thurber Park Artist-in-Resident, put together through the Madison Arts Commission and the Bubbler at Madison Public Library in Madison, Wisconsin.

He held a solo exhibition at the University of Arkansas Little Rock Windgate Center for Art + Design in 2020 titled Celebrating Death: Fantasy Coffins of Ghana by Eric Adjetey Anang. This exhibition showcased Adjetey Anang's fantasy coffins ranging from a giant hot pepper or a wing-tipped shoe.

=== Academics ===
Eric Adjetey Anang is also involved in anthropological research related to Ga people with Roberta Bonetti, an affiliate professor in History of Anthropology at University of Bologna and Fellow at Italian Academy for Advanced Studies, Columbia University.

== Awards and honors ==
At the age of 24, Eric Adjetey Anang was acknowledged as "a model for African urban youths" by the French newspaper Le Monde diplomatique.

== Recognition ==
In 2009, Adjetey Anang was featured in a television commercial for the energy drink Aquarius., who wanted to tell stories of real and incredible people. The commercial told the story of Adjetey Anang and the coffin making business, and included over 300 local cast members in a fishing village called Teshie, in Accra, Ghana.

WPT/Wisconsin Life aired a segment in 2018 called Coffin Life about Adjetey Anang and his work, which won an Emmy for Outstanding Achievement for Magazine Programming - Segment at the Chicago/Midwest Chapter of the National Academy of Television Arts & Sciences.
