= Alliance Française de Madras =

Franco-Indian non-profit association in Chennai, India

Alliance Française of Madras L'Alliance Française de Madras
- Founded: 10 August 1953
- Type: French cultural and language center
- Headquarters: Chennai
- Location: 24, College Road, Nungambakkam, Chennai, Tamil Nadu, India
- Origins: Le Groupe Français (1948)
- Region served: Tamil Nadu, India
- Product: French cultural and language education
- Director: Patricia Théry-Hart
- President: Durgaprasad TK
- Secretary: Aswin Suren
- Key people: Deputy Director / Course Director: Gisèle Pio

Alliance Française of Madras (French: L'Alliance Française de Madras) is an Indo-French cultural centre and non-profit association in Chennai, India, that works to promote the cultural relations between India and France in Tamil Nadu and also with a mission to teach the French language to the people in the region. It was established in the year 1953.

== History ==
The city's relations with France date back to the 18th century. In 1948, a French Group, consisting mostly of Indian citizens, was formed to spread the French language and culture. Four years later, on 10 August 1953, the group officially joined the Alliance Française network, registered under the Indian Societies Act XXI of 1860.

In 1991, the Translation Cell of Alliance Française of Madras was founded.

In December 2022, a new building with the gallery "Espace 24" was opened in the premises to house the centre for cultural research and studies. The building has classrooms and event spaces and hosts art and cultural exhibitions.

== Institution ==
Alliance Française of Madras is part of the network of the 14 Alliances Françaises in India, under the jurisdiction of the Embassy of France in New Delhi and of the larger network of Alliances Françaises in 136 countries around the world, which themselves come under the Fondation Alliance Française in Paris.

The Alliance Française of Madras is situated in College Road, Nungambakkam. It is governed by an Executive Committee consisting of a President, Vice-President, Secretary, Treasurer, and three Executive Members. The premises covers more than 2,600 square metres (28,000 sq ft) and includes a garden, parking spaces and the main building. The building occupies 1,700 square metres (18,000 sq ft) spread over three floors. There are classrooms, an exhibition gallery, a library-cum-multimedia centre, an auditorium and a cafeteria (La Cantine). The library-cum-multimedia centre situated at the entrance covers 130 sq m and was renovated in 2008. It has four rooms. It is open on all days except Sundays. The Edouard Michelin Auditorium, which can accommodate 180 persons, is used for film projections, plays, lectures and discussions.

About 3,000 students enroll at the Alliance Française of Madras every year to learn French. The Alliance française de Madras is only centre in Tamil Nadu to offer DELF and DALF examinations, as well as French language assessment of CCIP (Chambre de Commerce et d'Industrie de Paris) such as TEF and DFP.

The Alliance Française of Madras also has branches outside Chennai, in Coimbatore and Trichy.

== Publication ==
Prélude (Prelude) is a monthly programme published by the Alliance Française of Madras. It provides information about the cultural events and the language courses scheduled for the next two months. The 16-page newsletter in color is made available only to the members of the Alliance, although it is distributed during events at the Alliance or given to occasional visitors.
