= Alliance Française de Port Harcourt =

Nigerian educational institution

- Founded: 1983
- Type: French cultural and language center
- Location: 20 Herbert Macaulay Street, Amadi Flats, Old GRA, Port Harcourt, Nigeria
- Region served: Port Harcourt, Uyo, Calabar, Nigeria
- Product: French cultural and language education
- Key people: Director: Marie-Hélène Predhom
- Staff: 34
- Website: www.af-nigeria.org

The Alliance Francaise of Port Harcourt (French: l'Alliance Française de Port Harcourt) is a Nigerian institution in Port Harcourt, Rivers State devoted to training and educating people residing within or around the city in French language and culture. It commenced operations in 1983, and has served over 18,000 students since its establishment. Supported by the Government of Rivers State, the institution is affiliated with the worldwide network of over 800 Alliances.

== Background ==
Due to increased enrollment and participation, the Alliance relocated its offices to the current site on Herbert Macaulay Street. The premises comprise a library, nine classrooms, including four with interactive whiteboards, a local restaurant, a terrace and an open-air auditorium that has a total capacity of more than 200 guests. The Alliance is run by a director, one deputy director (director of studies), about twenty teachers of French as a foreign language and more than 10 administrative staff.

== See also ==
- Alliance Française
- Old GRA, Port Harcourt
