= Alliance Française de Wuhan =

Coordinates: 30.5931°N 114.3054°E

Alliance française de Wuhan
- Founded: 2000
- Type: Cultural institution
- Location: Wuhan, China
- Product: French cultural and language education
- Website: www.wuhan.afchine.org

The Alliance Française of Wuhan (French pronunciation: [aljɑ̃s fʁɑ̃sɛːz də u.an], Mandarin: [wùxân]; "Wuhan French Alliance") is a non-profit, non governmental cultural and educational association. Its mission is to promote the French language and Francophone cultures in Wuhan and Hubei, as well as intercultural exchanges; all within the context of the international network of the Alliance Française.

== French language center ==
Alliance Française de Wuhan is based on three sites; the main center in Wuchang, the annex in Hankou and Hanyang.
