= Alliance Française de Washington =

Coordinates: 38°55′01″N 77°02′55″W

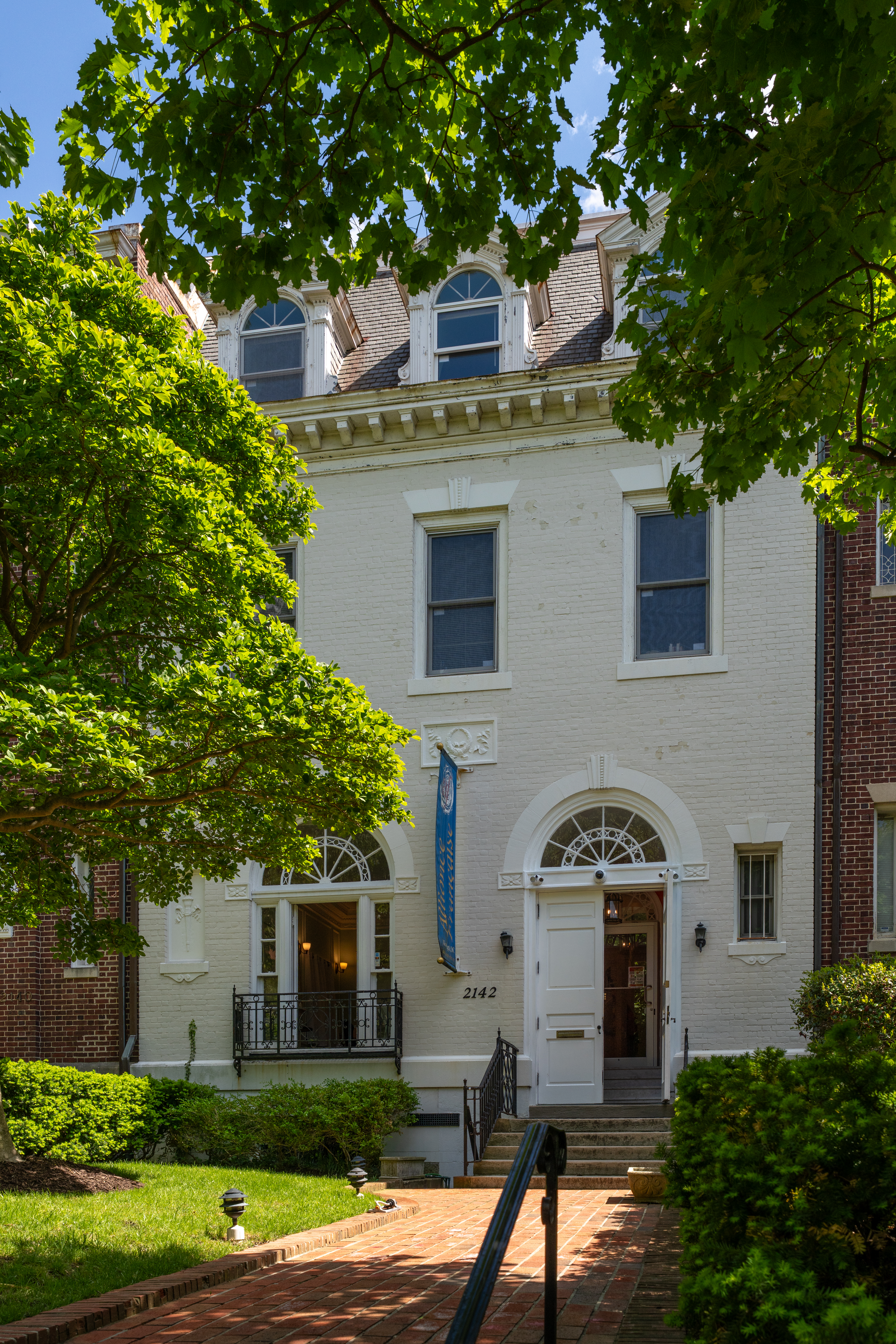
- Type: French cultural and language center
- Established: 1949
- Founder: André De Limur
- President: Melanie Brody
- Director: Sarah Diligenti
- Students: 4000 admissions in 2010
- Location: Washington DC, United States
- Website: francedc.org

The Alliance Française of Washington (AFDC) is a non-profit, non governmental cultural and educational American association. Its mission is to promote the French language and Francophone cultures in the Capital Region, as well as intercultural exchanges, within the context of the international network of the Alliance Française

== History ==
In 1883, Jean-Jules Jusserand, the French ambassador to the United States and one of the founding fathers of the Alliance Française de Paris, encouraged the capital's French-American to establish an Alliance Française in Washington. It was achieved in 1905.

In 1910, the Alliance counted 93 members and a staff of eight volunteers.

By 1945, however, the Alliance had met its demise due to the closing of the French Embassy during the Vichy regime.

In 1949, André De Limur, a French officer voluntarily engaged on the side of the Allies, and who had become a US citizen, agreed to revive the Alliance Française de Washington.

De Limur went to Washington after the war and dedicated himself to the promotion of France. He was thus the first President of the Alliance Française de Washington from 1949 to 1963. Due to the political-social relations of De Limur, this Alliance proved useful place for diplomatic services.

Marguerite La Follette served as president and executive director of the Alliance Française de Washington from June 1963 until 1989. During this time, the Alliance was immersed in various projects, the most important of which was the purchase of its current site at 2142 Wyoming Avenue, in the Kalorama neighborhood, in 1970.

Eventually in its development, the Alliance demonstrated a need for professional administration, programs and accounting. In 1990 Dominique Choserot was sent as teacher and executive director. Daniel Blondy succeeded Choserot in 1993, serving until 1998. Laurent Mellier assumed the post in 1998 and served until 2010 when Thomas Chaurin replaced him. Sarah Diligenti has served as Executive Director since 2013.

Today, it counts more than 3,200 members and more than 4,000 registrations in French classes a year. Its operating budget ($1.5 million) comes from tuitions, memberships and contributions (individuals, corporations and foundations.) With a board of directors of 24 members, it has 12 employees, 25 teachers and c. 60 volunteers.

== French language center ==
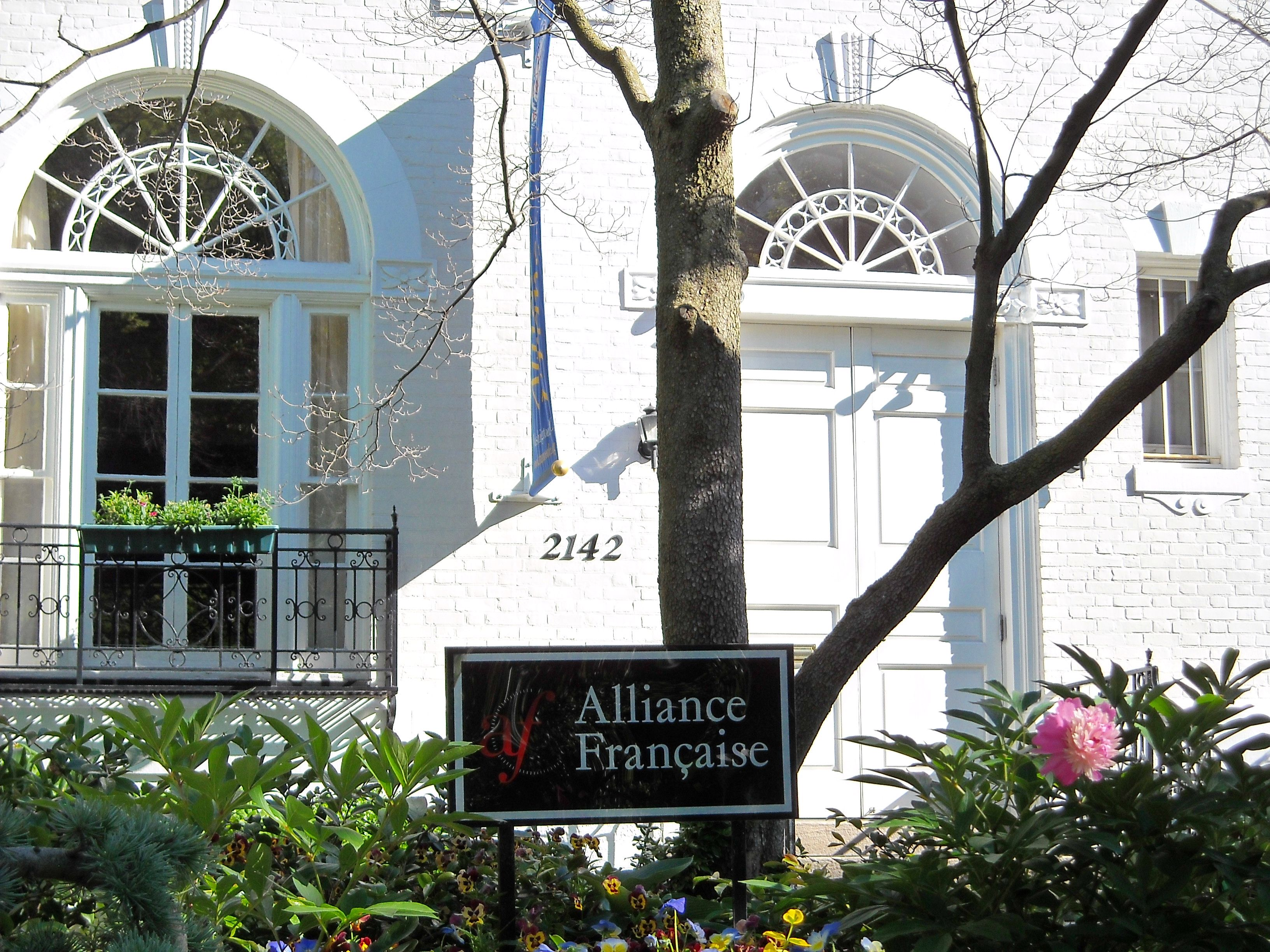
Entrance of the Alliance française in Washington DC.

All instructors are native French speakers emphasizing conversation and a contextual approach to language learning.

The Alliance Française de Washington provides:
- Formal language acquisition classes, both group and individual, online and in-person
- Language workshops
- Literature and conversation groups

It uses new technologies like Smart Boards and web 2.0 for group and individual classes, for both adults and children.

The Alliance is an official exam center, administering evaluations of French language proficiency and awarding several internationally recognized diplomas based on the Common European Framework of Reference for Languages. As of 2026, AFDC offers the DAEFLE, DELF, DALF, TCF, and the Test d'évaluation du français certificate (TEF), a diploma offered by the Chamber of Commerce and Industry of Paris.

== Cultural and social events ==
The Alliance Française de Washington offers a wide variety of social activities and cultural events, including lectures, concerts, films, exhibits, guided tours to museums, "wine and cheese" parties, and discussion groups.

The cultural department organizes more than 110 events, mostly at partners' venues. Local partners include the Smithsonian Associates, the Library of Congress, the Washington, DC Francophonie Committee Embassies, Georgetown University, George Washington University, the University of Maryland, the Goethe Institut, the Shakespeare Theater, the Hillwood Museum, the Phillips Collection, the Lisner Auditorium, the Bohemian Caverns and many more.

Major past events include writers Amélie Nothomb, Andrei Makine, Michel Houellebecq and Bernard Werber, Le Monde Cartoonist Plantu, Singers Les Nubians and Angelique Kidjo, Jazz musicians Jacky Terrasson and Guillaume de Chassy.

== Outreach Program ==
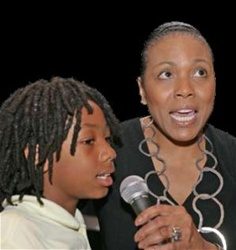
Outreach Program

Created in 2002, the outreach program reaches 300 children each year in public elementary schools mostly in Northeast and Southeast DC.

The main goal of this program is to bring an initiation to the French language and Francophone world to underprivileged elementary students in DC public schools (DCPS.) It is also to give them an appreciation of French-speaking cultures (from France and the French-speaking world) through student participation in some of the Alliance Française cultural activities, either on or off-site. The program runs on the basis of three years in a school.

Regular cultural workshops with French singers, actors and lecturers are offered. Past workshops include Gilles Ellkaïm (a solo French explorer of the Eurasian Arctic), Le Monde Cartoonist Plantu, les Acrostiches (renowned French acrobats), Jean Clottes (paleontologist), and Dee Dee Bridgewater (jazz singer). The program is funded through an annual fundraising gala.

== The library ==
The library has a collection of over 10,000 books, French newspapers, magazines, videos, DVDs and CDs. The collections are open to the public; AF members may borrow materials for free.

The library's collections focus on contemporary French and francophone culture. Students of French can refer to this page for bibliographies by CECR (A1-C2) level.

Current in-house magazine subscriptions include: Jeune Afrique, Courrier International, Nouvel Observateur, Paris Match, Le Monde Diplomatique, Elle, Historia, Géo, Marie-Claire Idées, Le Français dans le Monde, France, France-Amérique, France Today, Beaux Arts, Lire, Science & Vie, and Mon Jardin Ma Maison, among others.

In addition to on-site collections, the Alliance offers access to the first French e-library in the United States, Culturethèque, with more than 200 magazines and newspapers, e-books, bandes dessinées, and music.

online catalog

== The public ==
Students range from children aged 12 months to seniors with an average age of 35 years.

The Alliance communicates regularly to 25,000 individuals through mailed brochures, blast e-mails, its website, a blog, and via Facebook and Twitter.
