= Éric Kayser =

French baker and food writer (born 1964)

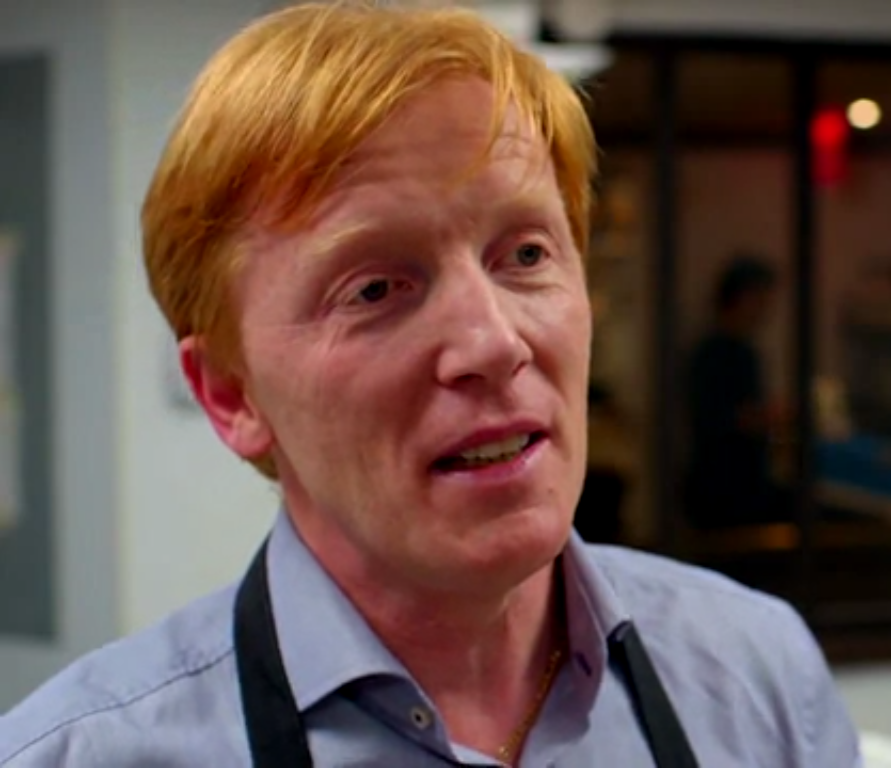
- Born: October 16, 1964 (age 62); Lure, Haute-Saône
- Culinary career
- Cooking style: French
- Current restaurant
- Maison Kayser

Éric Kayser (born 16 October 1964 in Lure, Haute-Saône) is a French baker and food writer.

== Early years ==
Kayser's great-grandfather, grandfather, and father were all traditional French bakers in Lorraine. In 1975, when he was 11, his parents moved to the Côte d’Azur. He did his apprenticeship at Fréjus. In 1983, aged 19 Kayser became a Compagnon. He quickly realized his call for baking at a young age and decided to pursue his passion. In 1994, together with fellow companion Patrick Castagna, Kayser invented the Fermento Levain. This piece of equipment allows for the continuous use of liquid levain, a breakthrough in the field. Eric Kayser also worked simultaneously to train young bakers with the INBP, the French National Institute of Baking and Patisserie.

== Maison Kayser ==
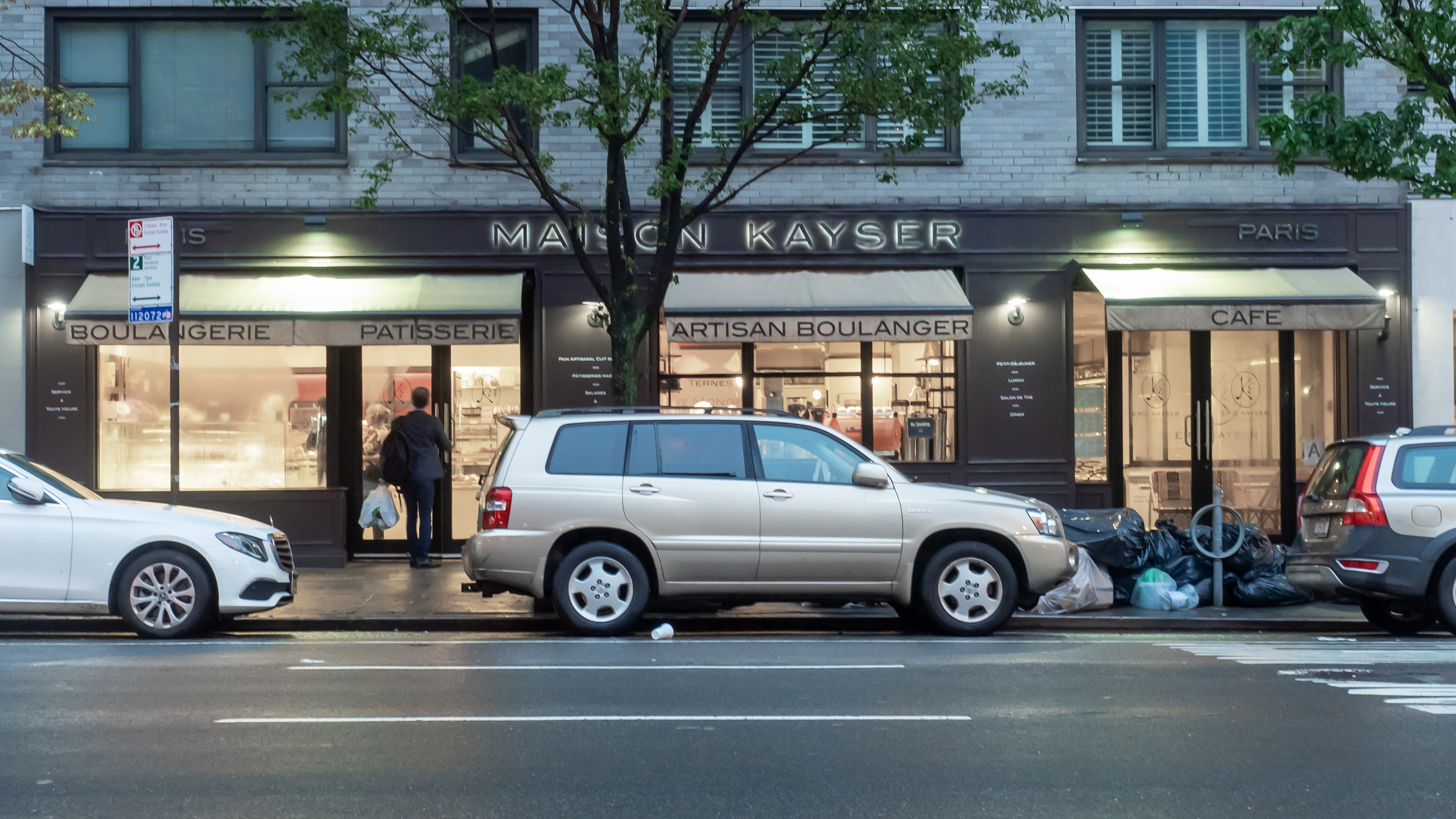
Maison Kayser in Manhattan

On September 13, 1996, Kayser opened his first bakery at 8 rue Monge in Paris. It was an instant success, garnering much critical acclaim. The opening of many more bakeries in Paris and in various countries abroad followed very quickly. Today, there are over 200 Maison Kayser locations worldwide. With 28 in Paris alone, more locations have opened throughout Tunisia, Greece, Portugal, Russia, Japan, Ukraine, United Kingdom, Cambodia, Morocco, Senegal, Ivory Coast, South Korea, Lebanon, the UAE, Chile, Indonesia, Singapore, Colombia Mexico, the US, Hong Kong, Taiwan, the Philippines, Nigeria, Israel and DR Congo. The products and services in the bakeries vary from country to country, based on the local tastes and flavors. Due to the COVID-19 pandemic Maison Kayser USA filed for bankruptcy.

== Books ==
- Les tartes d'Éric Kayser 2006
- Mes recettes: Céréales, graines et fruits secs Éric Kayser - 2008
- Mes petits biscuits sucrés et salés Éric Kayser, Yaïr Yosefi
- The Larousse Book of Bread: 80 Recipes to Make at Home - Éric Kayser - 2014
