= Embassy of France, Pretoria =

Diplomatic mission of France to the Republic of South Africa

French Embassy, Pretoria
- Location: Pretoria
- Address: 250 Melk Street, Pretoria
- Coordinates: 25.7727°S 28.2265°E
- Ambassador: David Martinon, French Ambassador to South Africa, Lesotho and Malawi

The French embassy in South Africa, Lesotho and Malawi is the main diplomatic mission of France in South Africa. The embassy is located at 250 Melk Street in Pretoria. David Martinon was appointed French Ambassador to South Africa, Lesotho and Malawi in 2023.
