= Alliance française =

International network for the promotion of the French language and culture

- Founded: 1883; 143 years ago
- Founder: Louis Pasteur, Ferdinand de Lesseps, Jules Verne, Ernest Renan, Armand Colin
- Type: Cultural institution
- Location(s): 101 Boulevard Raspail; 75006 Paris, France
- Region served: Worldwide
- Product: French cultural and language education
- Website: fondation-alliancefr.org

Alliance française (Note: Sometimes erroneously written "Alliance Française" with a capital "F", including by some Alliance française themselves.) (French pronunciation: [aljɑ̃s fʁɑ̃sɛːz]; "French Alliance", stylised as af) is an international organization that aims to promote the French language and francophone culture around the world. Created in Paris on 21 July 1883 under the name Alliance française pour la propagation de la langue nationale dans les colonies et à l'étranger (French alliance for the propagation of the national language in the colonies and abroad), known now simply as L'Alliance française, its primary goal is teaching French as a second language. Headquartered in Paris, the Alliance had 850 centers in 137 countries on every inhabited continent in 2014.

== History and role ==
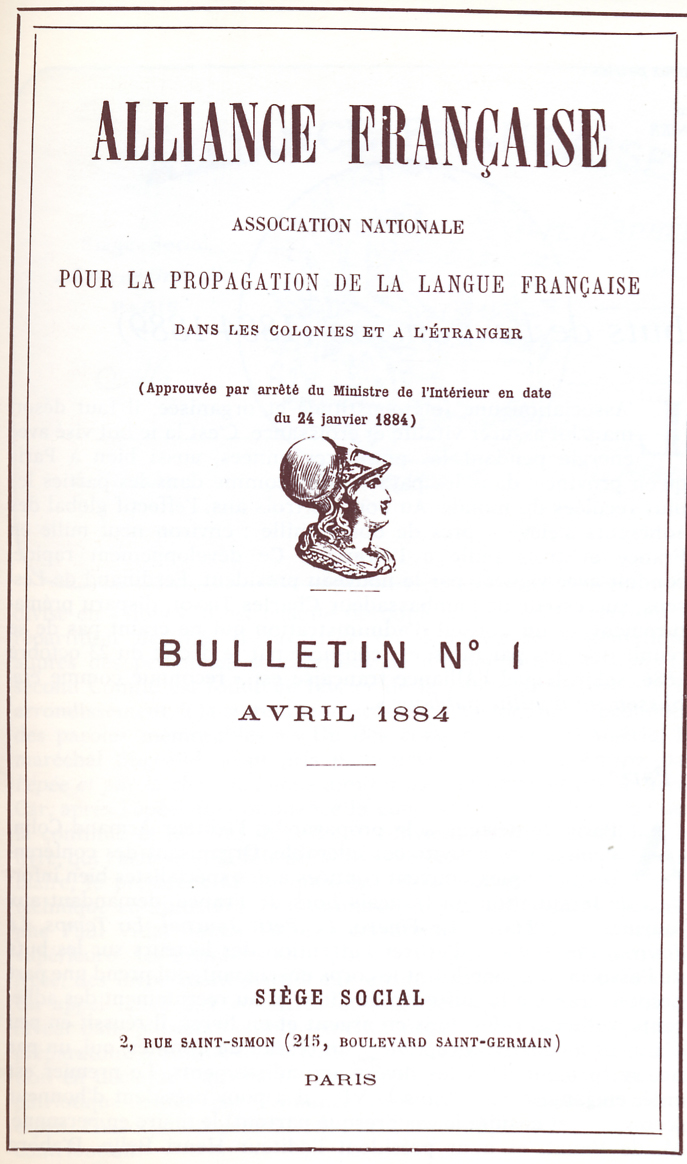
First publication of the Alliance française in 1884.

The Alliance was created in Paris on 21 July 1883 by a group including the scientist Louis Pasteur, the diplomat Ferdinand de Lesseps, the writers Jules Verne and Ernest Renan, and the publisher Armand Colin. The project was directly linked to the colonial aims of the French Third Republic. France believed it could spread civilization to colonies and promote French imperial grandeur by propagating their language internationally.

The organization finances most of its activities from the fees it receives from its courses and from rental of its installations. The French government also provides a subsidy covering approximately five percent of its budget (nearly 665,000 € in 2003).

More than 440,000 students learn French at one of the centres run by the Alliance, whose network of schools includes:

- a centre in Paris, Alliance française Paris Île-de-France
- locations throughout France for foreign students and
- 1,016 locations in 135 countries.

The organizations outside Paris are local, independently run franchises. Each has a committee and a president. The Alliance française brand is owned by the Paris centre. In many countries, the Alliance française of Paris is represented by a Délégué général. The French Government also runs 150 separate French Cultural Institutes that exist to promote French language and culture.

The Alliances organize social and cultural events, such as art exhibitions, movie festivals, social gatherings, book clubs.

== By country ==
=== France ===
- Fondation Alliance française

==== Paris ====
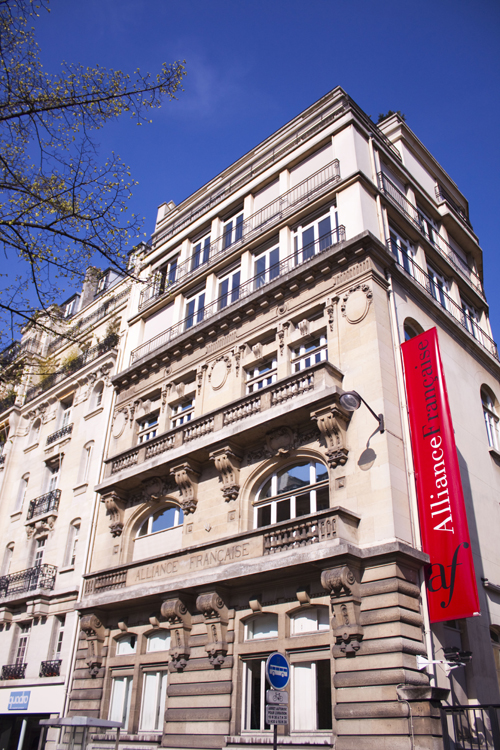
Alliance française Paris Île-de-France, boulevard Raspail (allée Claude Cahun–Marcel Moore)

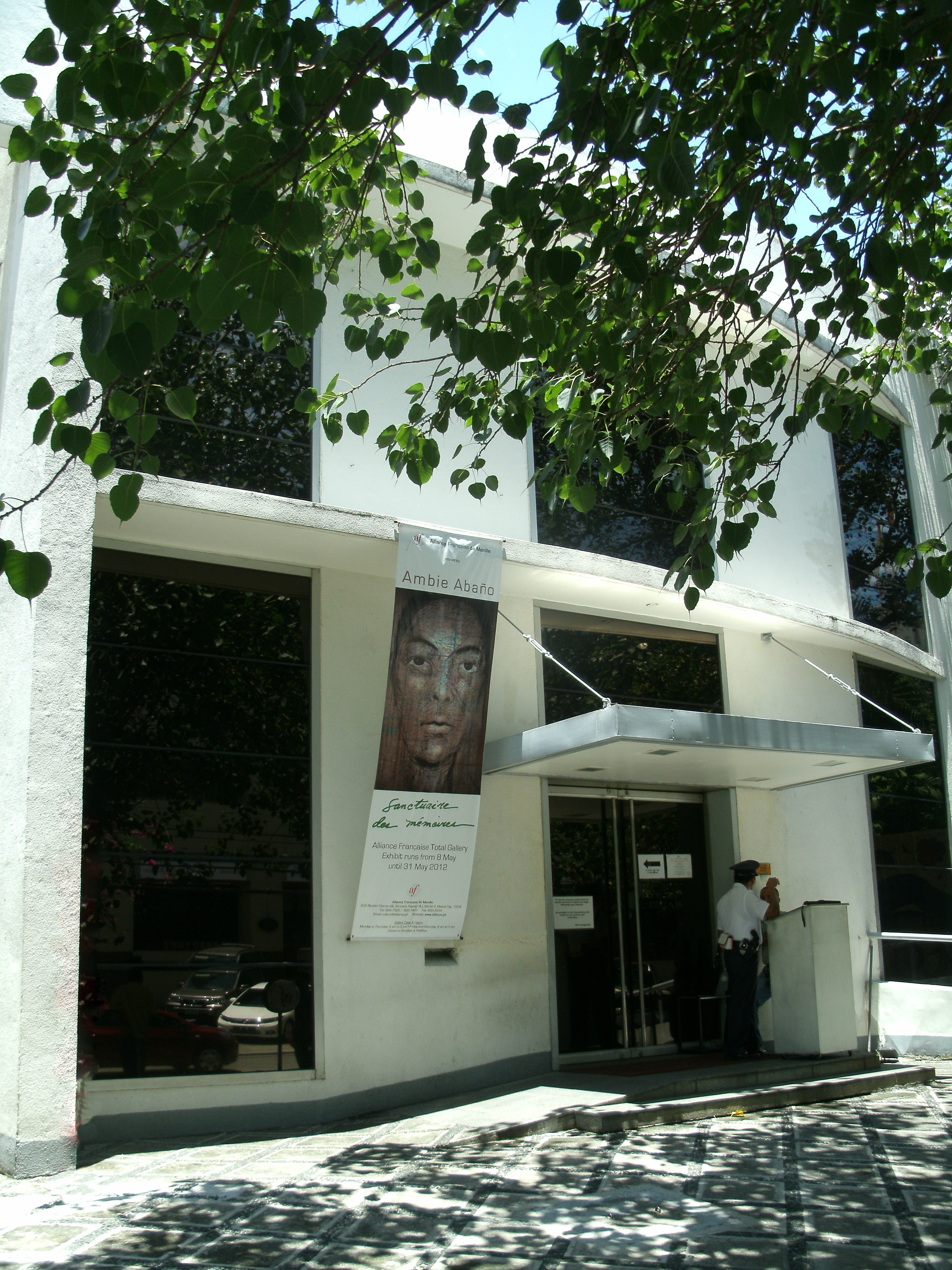
Alliance française de Manille, the oldest branch in the Far East, in Makati City, Philippines, extant since the 1920s

- Alliance française Paris Île-de-France

The Alliance française Paris Ile-de-France is a Higher Private Education Institute. Located in the centre of the capital, the Alliance française Paris Île-de-France receives more than 11,000 students from 160 countries arrive every year. It is the oldest one since the school has offered courses in Paris since 1894.

Until 2007, the year of creation of the Alliance française Foundation, the Alliance française Paris Île-de-France was called "the Paris Alliance française".

It was divided into three branches: the International Relations (DRI), the School of Paris, and the Department of Human and Financial Resources (DRHF). In 2007, the DRI has become the Alliance française Foundation, while the School and the DRHF became the Alliance française Paris Île-de-France.

Three conventions are now governing the relations between the Foundation and the Alliance française Paris Île-de-France:

- a financial agreement: the Alliance française Paris Ile-de-France supports the Foundation financially.
- an agreement for the premises: the Paris Alliance française donated its building in Boulevard Raspail to the Foundation at the time of the division in 2007
- a teaching agreement: the Alliance française Paris Ile-de-France supports the Alliances françaises worldwide in their projects to professionalize their teaching and administrative staff. More than 40 missions per year are made abroad.

==== Montpellier ====
Alliance française Montpellier is a French language school in the south of France, a private higher education institution providing French courses for foreigners (FLE) and a non-profit association, established in accordance with the statutes and objectives of the Alliance française Foundation. This study centre is part of the network of Alliances françaises de France.

=== Africa ===
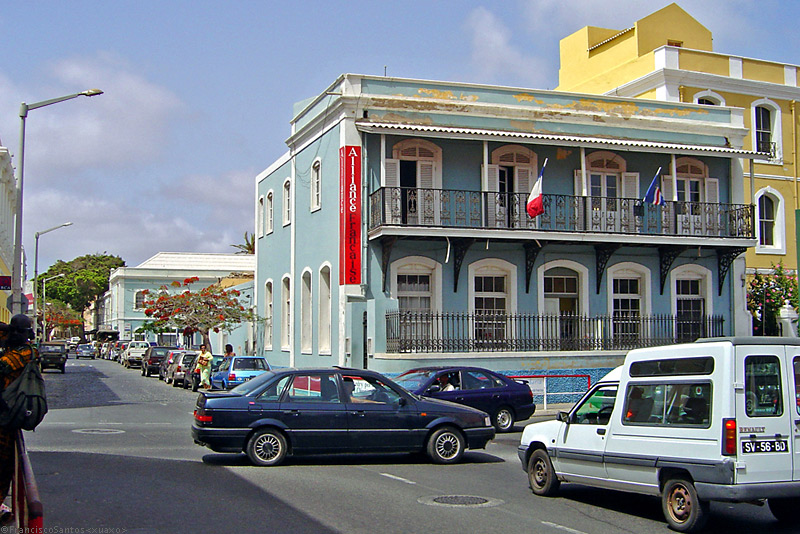
Alliance française in Mindelo, São Vicente Island, Cape Verde

- Botswana 1
- Comoros 3
- Eritrea 1
- Ethiopia 2 (Addis Ababa and Dire Dawa)
- Ghana 4
- Kenya 4 (Nairobi, Mombasa, Eldoret, and Kisumu)
- Lesotho 1
- Madagascar 29
- Mauritius 6
- Mozambique 1
- Namibia 1
- Nigeria 10 (Alliance française de Port Harcourt, Alliance française de Lagos )
- Southern Africa 13 (Alliance française of Port Elizabeth)
- Swaziland 1
- Tanzania 2 (Dar es Salaam, Arusha)
- Uganda 1
- Zambia
- Zimbabwe 1

=== Americas ===
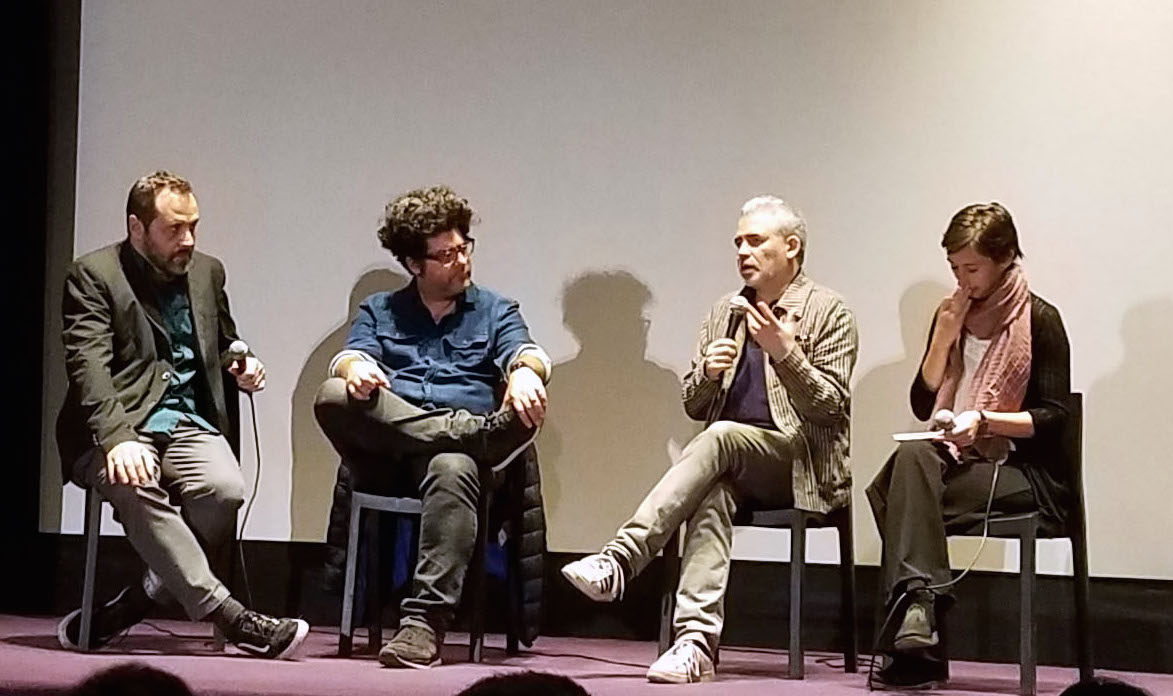
French filmmaker Stéphane Brizé (second from the right) in Buenos Aires in 2019, at an event supported by Alliance française de Buenos Aires.

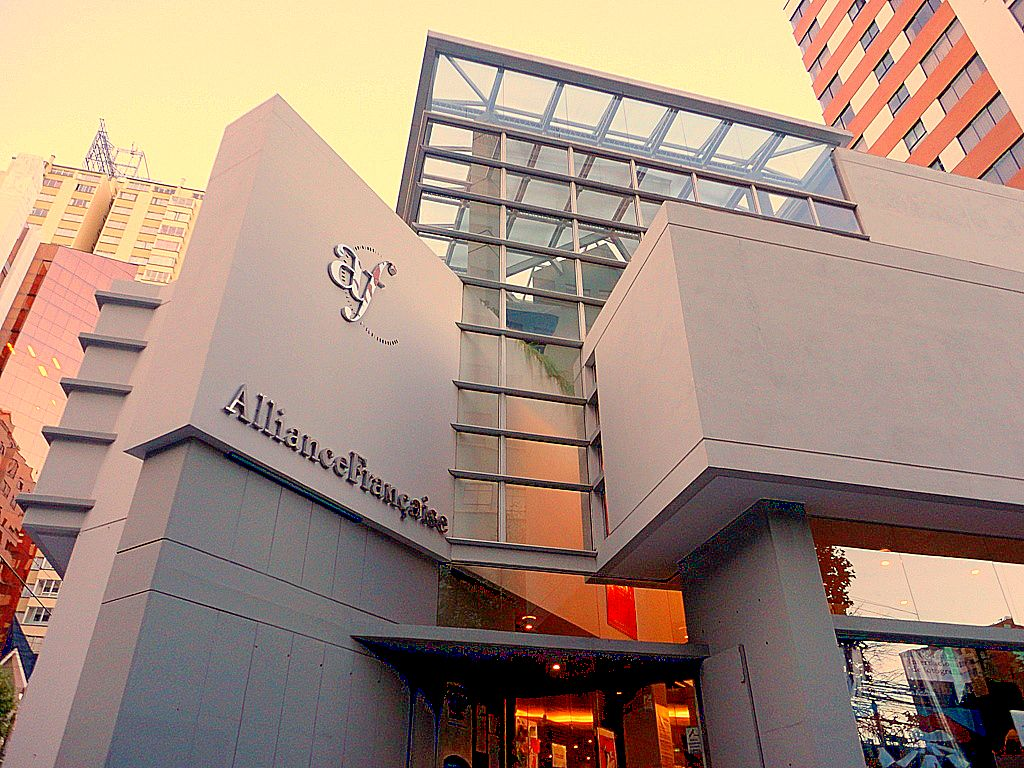
Alliance française in La Paz, Bolivia

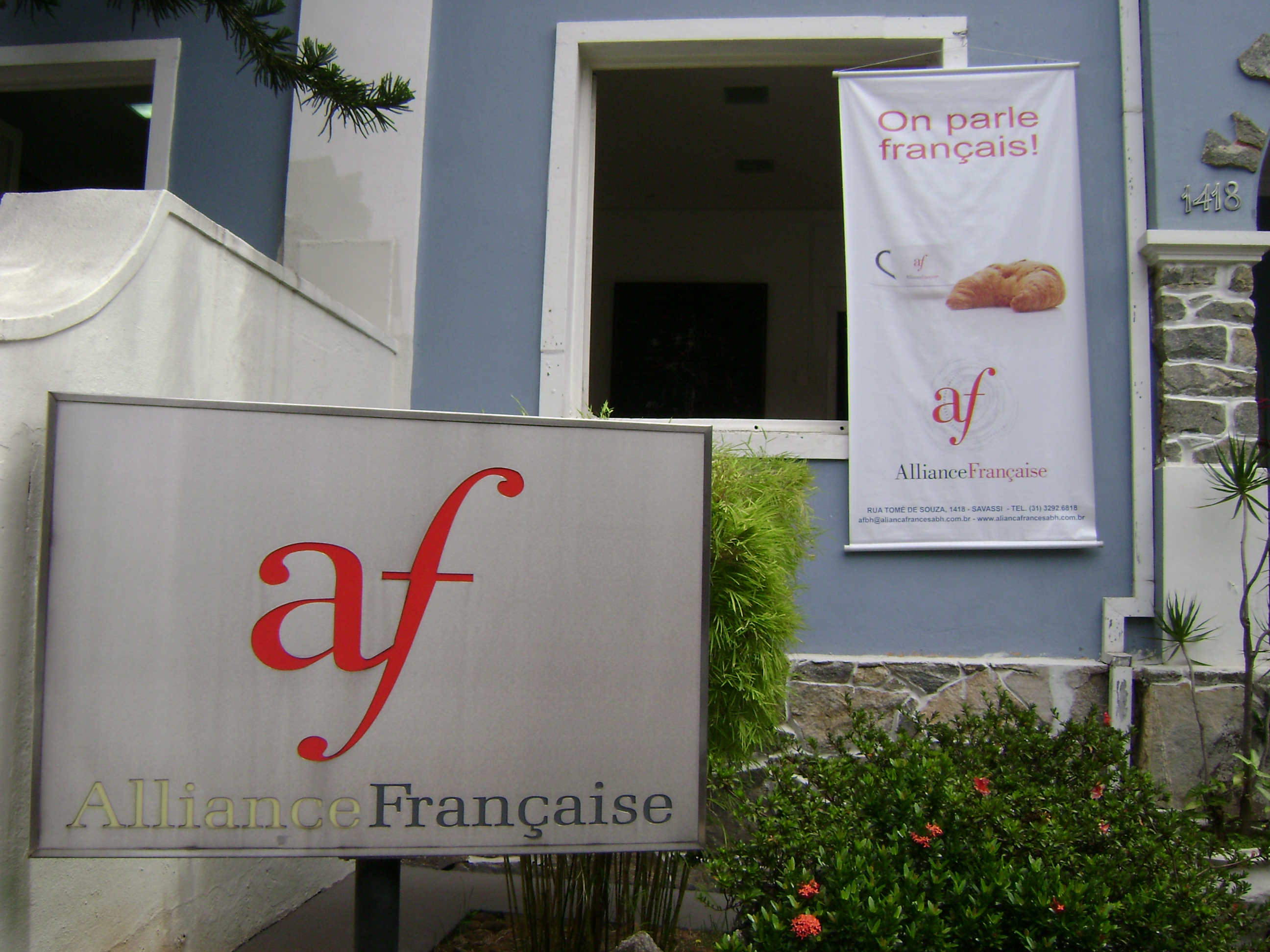
Alliance française in Belo Horizonte, Brazil.

- Argentina there are 72 partnerships with 16,000 students forming a network is considered one of the largest and oldest in the world. In Rosario, Buenos Aires, Córdoba, Campana, Santa Fe, Mendoza.
- Bermuda has one Alliance française.
- Bolivia has five Alliances françaises in all the main centers of population: Cochabamba, La Paz, Santa Cruz de la Sierra, Sucre, Tarija.
- Brazil There are 39 Alliance française schools in Brazil, and six partner learning centres. Out of the federation's 26 states, only seven have no schools or learning centres. Alliance française has been in the Brazilian educational scenario for more than 130 years, since 1885.
- Canada has 13 Alliances françaises in nine cities from coast to coast: Victoria, Vancouver, Calgary, Edmonton, Winnipeg, Montreal, Toronto (five campuses, located in Spadina, North York, Markham, Mississauga, and Oakville), Ottawa, Moncton, and Halifax.
- Chile has six Alliances françaises in six cities in Santiago, Viña del Mar, Concepción, Curicó, Antofagasta and Osorno.
- Colombia has more than 20 Alliances françaises in 16 cities.
- Costa Rica has three Alliances françaises, the first in Barrio Amón, in the East side of the capital San José and another two, one in La Sabana (West side of the capital) and also in Heredia, another province of Costa Rica.
- Cuba has three Alliances françaises, one located in Santiago de Cuba and the other two in Havana City.
- Dominica has one Alliance française, in the capital city, Roseau.
- Dominican Republic has 4 Alliance françaises, one in the capital city, Santo Domingo, and others in Santiago, Mao and Monte Cristi.
- Ecuador has five Alliances françaises, located in the capital city of Quito and in the cities of: Cuenca, Guayaquil, Loja and Portoviejo.
  - Alliance française in Quito was founded in 1953 and is the oldest of the five Alliances in Ecuador.
- El Salvador has one Alliance française Centre in the capital city, San Salvador.
- Grenada has one Alliance française in Saint George's
- Guatemala has one Alliance française, located in zone 13 of the capital, Guatemala City.
- Haiti has five Alliances françaises organizations.
- Honduras has two Alliances françaises, one located in Tegucigalpa and the other in San Pedro Sula.
- Jamaica has one Alliance française Centre in Kingston
- Mexico has 38 Alliances françaises organizations throughout the country and twelve affiliated centers. It has one of the first franchise in America, the Alliance Française de México
- Nicaragua has three Alliances françaises Centre, in the capital city, Managua and others in León and Granada
- Panama has one Alliance française organization.
- Paraguay has one Alliance française organization in Asunción.
- Peru has twelve Alliances françaises organizations, six in the capital city, Lima and others in Trujillo, Arequipa, Cusco, Piura, Huancayo and Iquitos.
- Puerto Rico has one Alliance française, located in the capital city of San Juan.
- Saint Kitts and Nevis has one Alliance française, located in the capital city of Basseterre.
- Saint Lucia has one Alliance française, located in the capital city of Castries.
- Trinidad and Tobago has one main centre located in the capital city, Port of Spain, with additional classes on offer in San Fernando and Tobago.

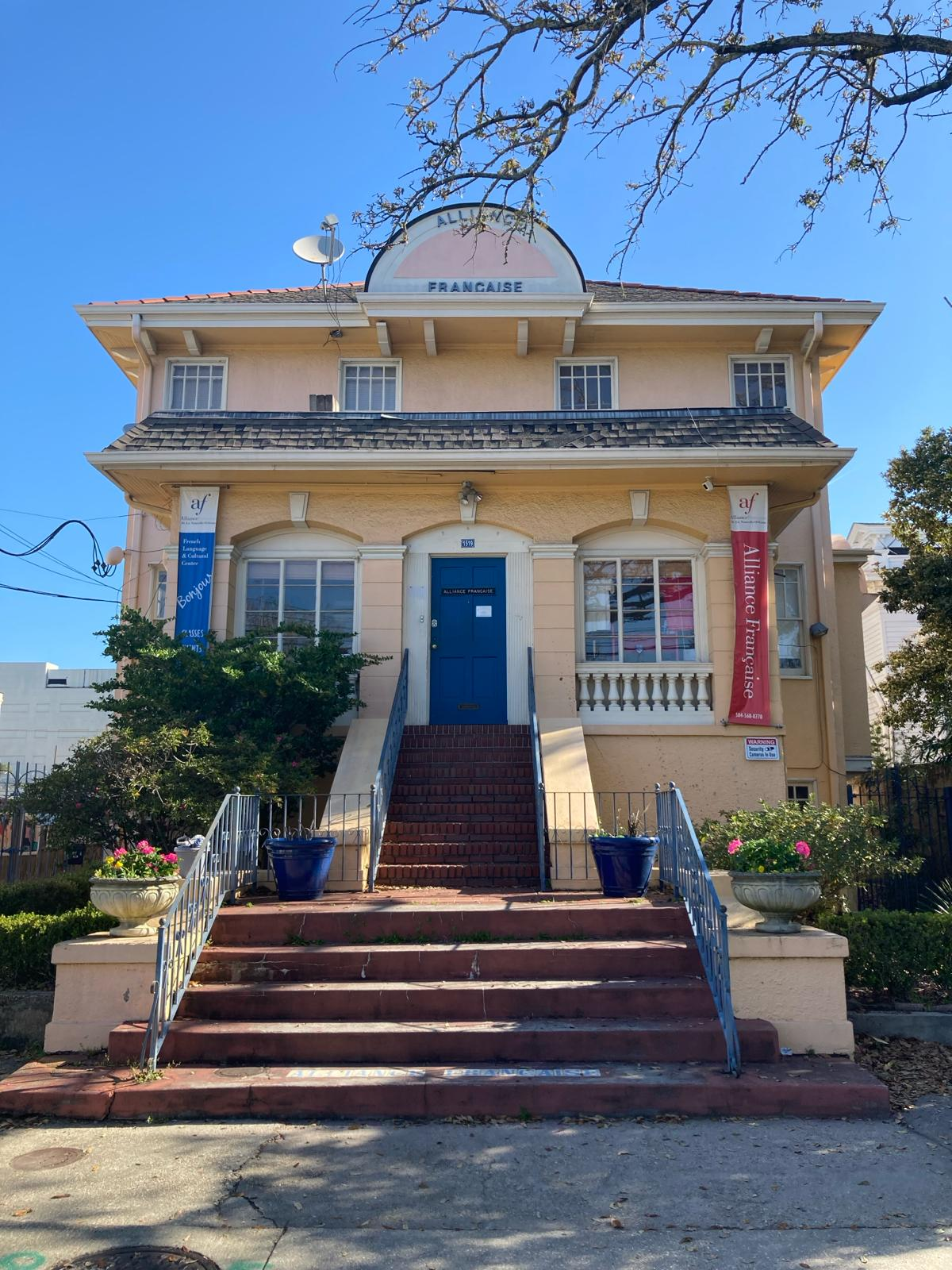
Alliance_Française_of_New_Orleans in New Orleans, Louisiana

- The United States has 110 chapters in 45 states, including French Institute Alliance Française in New York Alliance française de Washington, Alliance Française of New Orleans, Alliance française de Chicago, Alliance française de San Francisco, Alliance Française of the Twin Cities, Alliance Française San Diego and Alliance Française Silicon Valley.
- Uruguay has one Alliance française, located in the capital city, Montevideo
- Venezuela has twelve Alliances françaises, five in the capital city Caracas, and in several others states.

=== Asia and Oceania ===
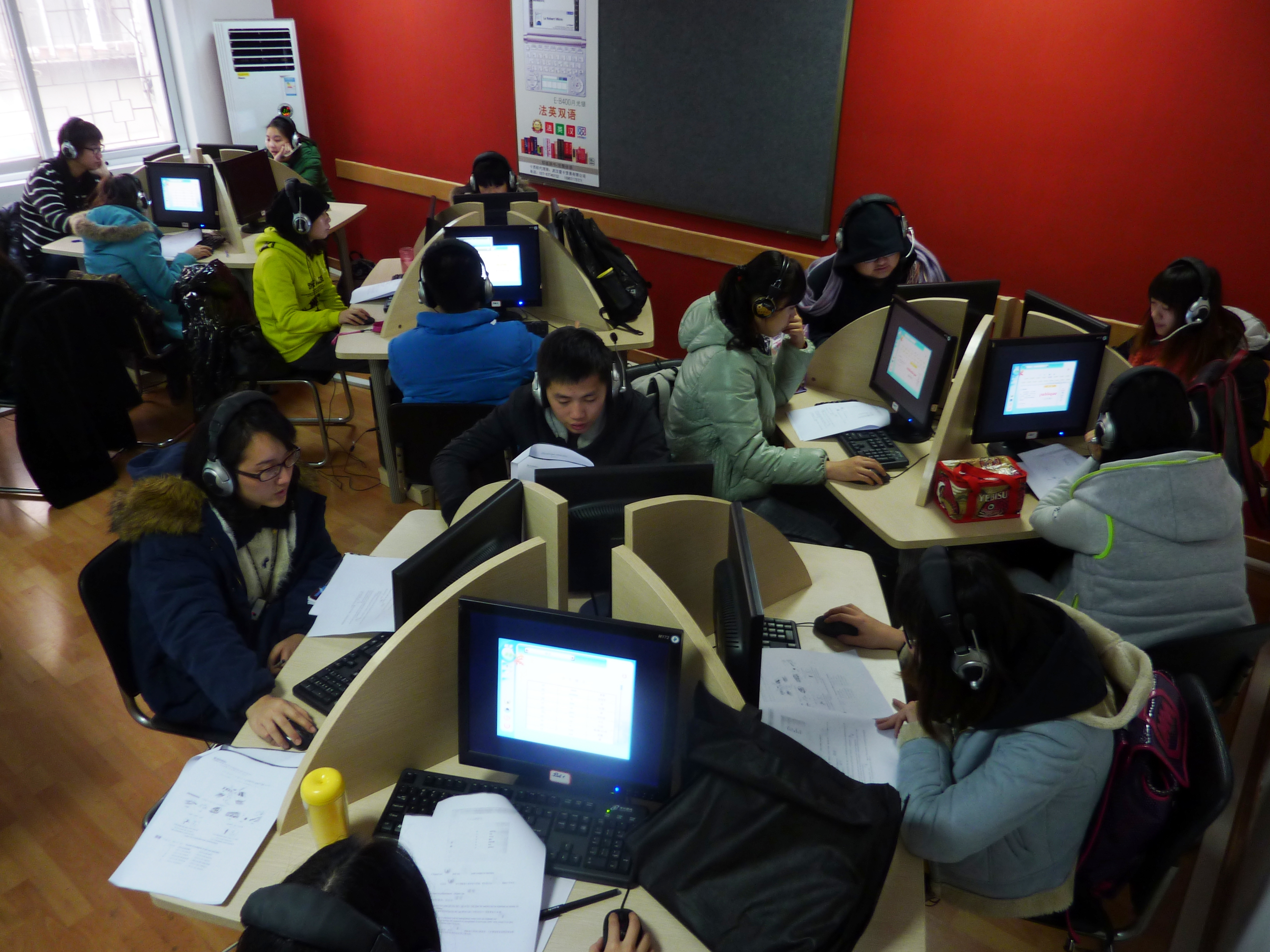
Alliance française de Wuhan in China

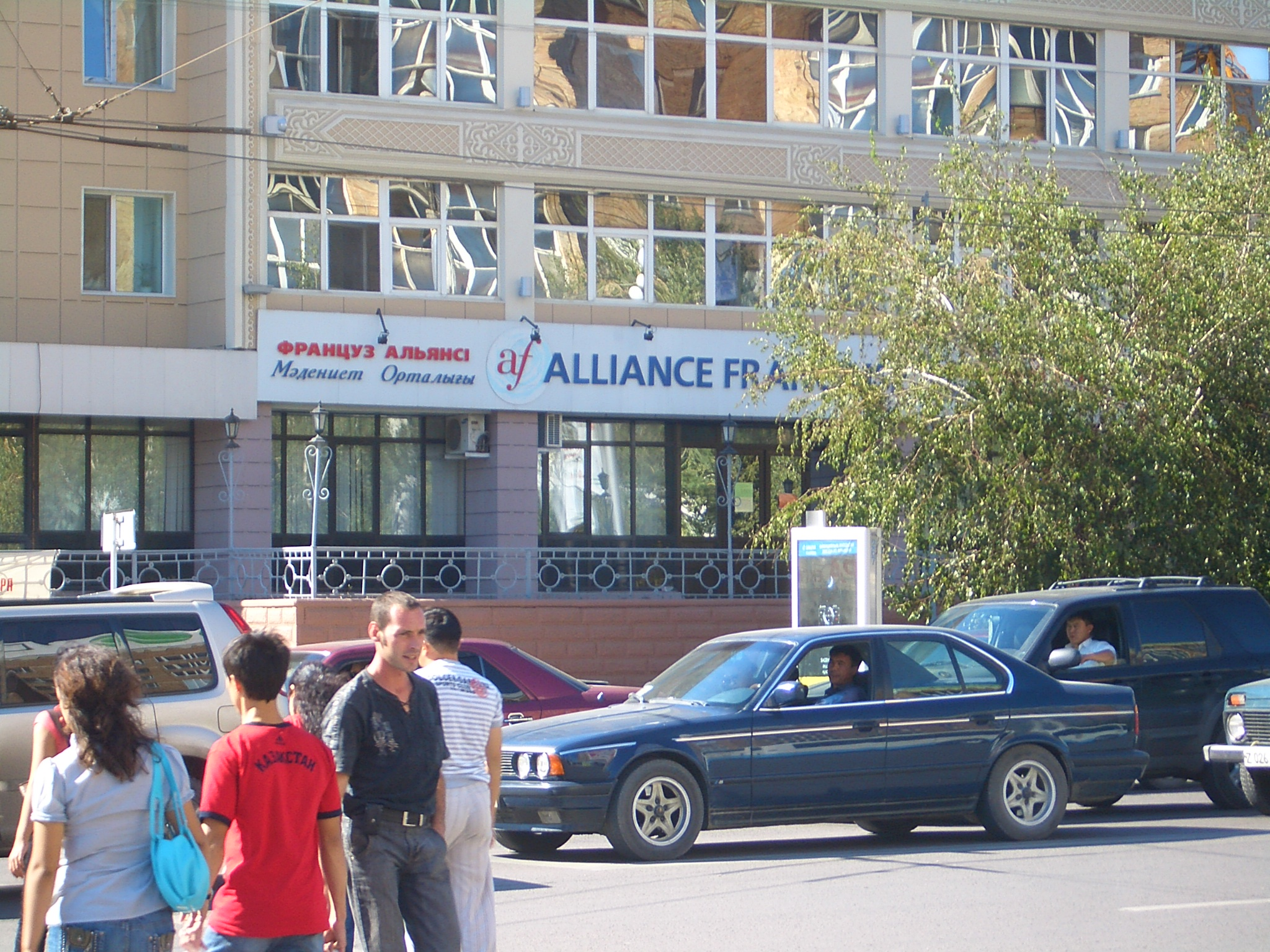
An Alliance Française office in Astana, Kazakhstan.

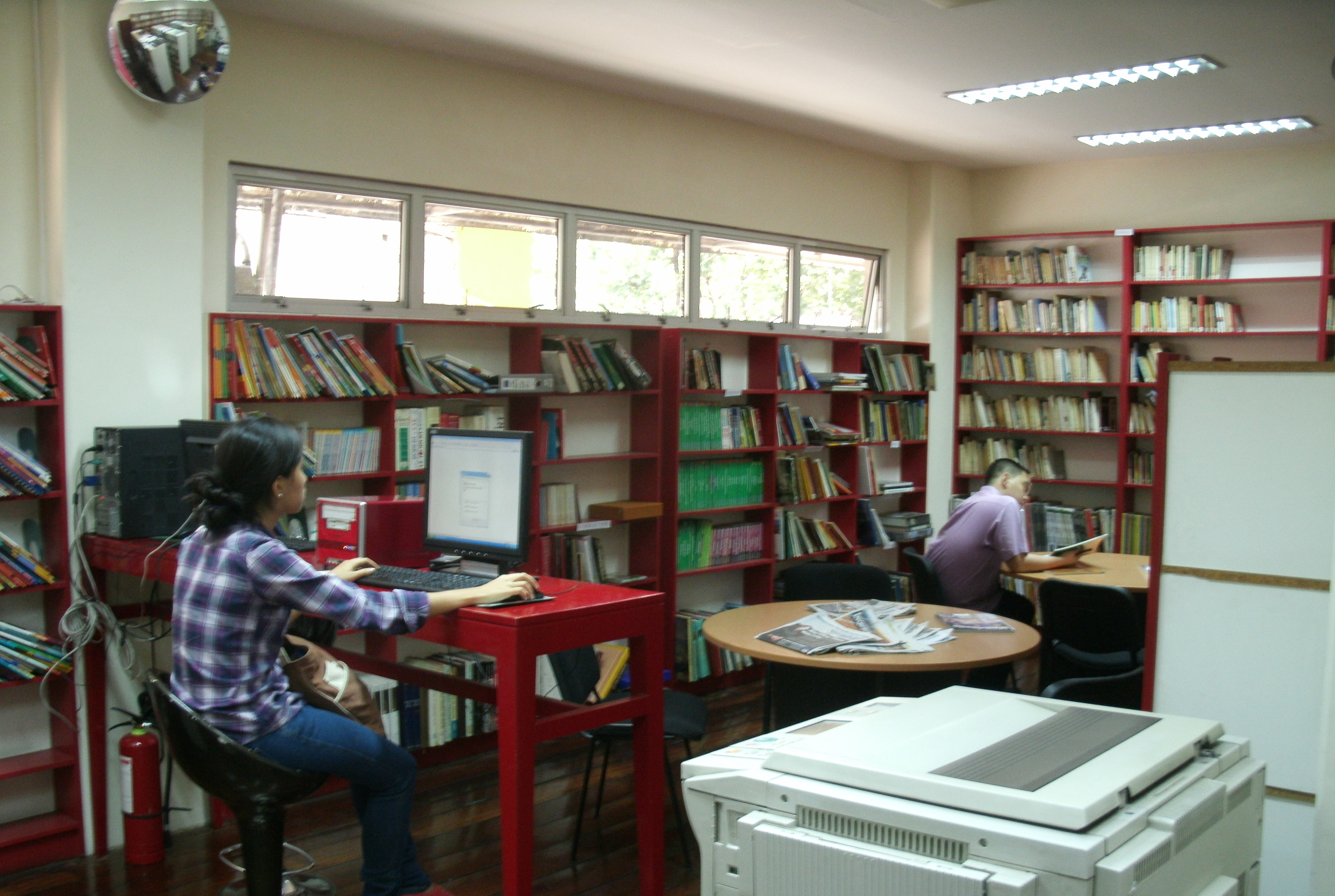
The Médiathèque of the Alliance Française de Manille

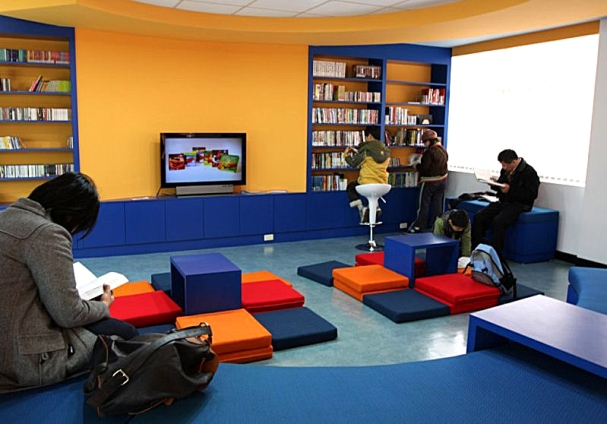
Alliance française de Taiwan

- Australia has 31 Alliances françaises organizations.
- Bangladesh has two Alliances françaises organizations, in Dhaka (Alliance française de Dhaka, two branches located in Dhanmondi and Gulshan) and in Chittagong.
- Brunei Darussalam
- Cambodia has one Alliance française, located in Siem Reap.
- China has fifteen Alliances françaises organizations: Beijing, Shanghai, Guangzhou, Dalian, Tianjin, Qingdao, Jinan, Chengdu, Wuhan, Chongqing, Hangzhou, Xian, and Nanjing.
- Hong Kong has three Alliances françaises centres, one in Wanchai, one in Jordan and another one in Shatin. Alliance française de Hong Kong was created in 1953.
- India has 24 Alliances françaises located in Ahmedabad, Bangalore, Bhopal, Chandigarh, Chennai (Alliance française de Madras), Coimbatore, Goa, Gurgaon, Hyderabad, Indore, Lucknow, Jaipur, Karikal, Kolkata, Madurai, Mahé, Mumbai, New Delhi, Nashik, Pondicherry, Pune, Mysore, Tiruchirappalli, Trivandrum, Vadodara.
- Indonesia has four Alliances françaises located in Medan, Balikpapan, Semarang and Denpasar.
- Kazakhstan has two Alliances françaises located in Astana and Almaty.
- Kyrgyzstan has one Alliance française, located in Bishkek.
- Macau
- Malaysia has three Alliances françaises centres, with two of them in Kuala Lumpur and another in George Town, Penang.
- Maldives has one center in the capital city of Malé.
- Mongolia
- Nepal has one centre in Kathmandu.
- New Zealand has seven Alliances françaises organizations. Auckland, Hamilton, Palmerston North, Wellington are the North Island branches, and Nelson, Christchurch, and Dunedin are the South Island branches. The Alliance française d'Auckland has 900 members.
- Pakistan has four Alliance françaises located in Karachi (Alliance française de Karachi), Lahore, Faisalabad and Islamabad.
- The Philippines has Alliance française de Cebu located in Cebu City, and Alliance française de Manille located in Makati City.
- Singapore has an Alliance française located in Newton.
- South Korea has seven Alliances françaises organizations: Seoul, Incheon, Daejeon, Jeonju, Gwangju, Daegu, and Busan.
- Sri Lanka has Alliance française de Kotte located in Colombo, and Alliance française de Kandy in Kandy.
- Taiwan has two Alliances françaises centres in Taipei and Kaohsiung.
- Thailand has its main centre in Bangkok and branches in Chiang Mai, Chiang Rai, and in the city of Phuket.
- Uzbekistan has an Alliance française located in capital, Tashkent.
- Vietnam has an Alliance française located near the Sword Lake, the focal point of central Hanoi.
- United Arab Emirates has three Alliance française centres in Abu Dhabi city, Khalifa city and Dubai.

=== Europe ===
- Albania has five Alliance française organization located in Durrës, Elbasan, Korça, Shkodra and Tirana.
- Armenia has one Alliance française organization located in Yerevan, the capital of Armenia.
- Belgium has one Alliance française organization located in the capital Brussels.
- Croatia has five Alliances françaises organizations located in Dubrovnik, Osijek, Rijeka, Split, and Zagreb, the capital of Croatia.
- Hungary has five Alliances françaises organizations located in Debrecen, Győr, Miskolc, Pécs and Szeged.
- Iceland has one Alliance française organization located in Reykjavik.
- Ireland has six Alliances françaises organizations. Dublin, the capital of Ireland, is home to the second largest Alliance in Europe. There is also a location in Cork, Ireland's second city. Other locations in Ireland include Galway, Kilkenny, Limerick, and Waterford, which also has a branch in Wexford. Alliance française de Cork also organises the Cork French Film Festival.
- Italy has thirty-seven Alliances françaises organizations located throughout the country.
- Malta has one Alliance francaise organization located in Floriana.
- Moldova has one Alliance française organization located in Chișinău, the capital of Moldova.
- Monaco has one Alliance française organization located in the Principality, at the Embassy of France in Monaco.
- The Netherlands counts 32 Alliances Françaises, the main one being located in The Hague, followed by 3 major other one in Amsterdam, Rotterdam and Utrecht. This network is very dynamic and powerful.
- Romania has four Alliances françaises organizations located in Brașov, Constanța, Pitești and Ploiești.
- Russia has thirteen offices - in Yekaterinburg, Irkutsk, Kazan, Nizhny Novgorod, Novosibirsk, Perm, Rostov-on-Don, Samara, Saratov, Tolyatti, Vladivostok, Ufa, and Ulyanovsk.
- Spain has twenty Alliances françaises organizations located all over the country, promoted by the Cultural Services of the French Embassy in Spain.
- Sweden has 17 Alliances françaises organizations throughout the country. The oldest Swedish organization was established in 1889 in Stockholm.
- Turkey has two Alliance française organizations located in Adana and Bursa.
- The United Kingdom has eleven Alliances françaises organizations. The first Alliance française organization in the UK was located in London, which traces its roots back to 1884. Other locations in the British Isles include Bristol-Bath, Cambridge, Exeter, Glasgow, Jersey, Manchester, Milton Keynes, Newcastle-upon-tyne, Oxford and York. During WWII, the London location served as the international headquarters of Alliance française when the Paris location was closed.

== See also ==
- Institut Français
- Cultural diplomacy
- Public diplomacy
- Istituto Italiano di Cultura
- British Council
- Goethe-Institut
- Instituto Cervantes
