= Orientalism in early modern France =

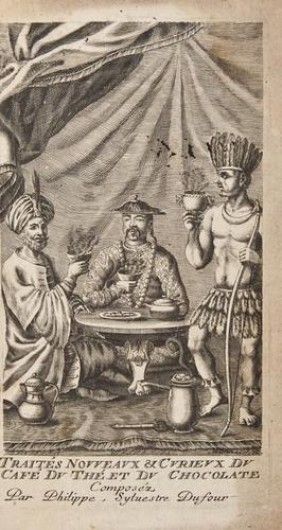
Traités nouveaux & curieux du café du thé et du chocolate, by Philippe Sylvestre Dufour, 1685

In early modern France, Orientalism refers to the interaction of pre-modern France with the Orient, and especially the cultural, scientific, artistic and intellectual impact of these interactions, ranging from the academic field of Oriental studies to Orientalism in fashions in the decorative arts.

== Early study of Oriental languages ==
The first attempts to study oriental languages were made by the Church in Rome, with the establishment of the Studia Linguarum in order to help the Dominicans liberate Christians enslaved by Barbary pirates. The first school was established in Tunis by Raymond of Penyafort in the 12th and early 13th century. In 1311, the Council of Vienne decided to create schools for the study of oriental languages in the universities of Paris, Bologna, Oxford, Salamanca and Rome.

== The first Orientalist, Guillaume Postel (1536) ==
The Ambassadors, a symbol of French explorations under Francis I: the French ambassadors Jean de Dinteville and Georges de Selve standing around an Ottoman Holbein carpet and various objects. Painting by Hans Holbein the Younger, 1533, National Gallery, London.

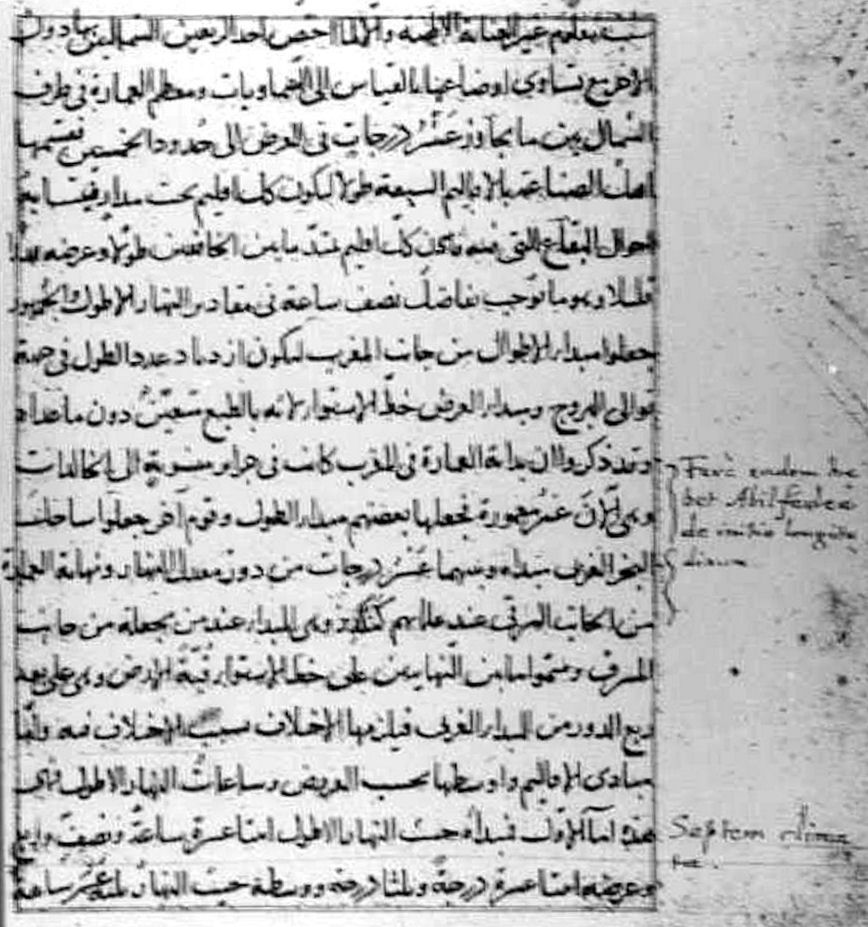
Arabic astronomical manuscript of Nasir al-Din al-Tusi, annotated by Guillaume Postel

From the 16th century, the study of oriental languages and cultures was progressively transferred from religious to royal patronage, as Francis I sought an alliance with the Ottoman Empire. Ottoman embassies soon visited France, one in 1533, and another the following year.

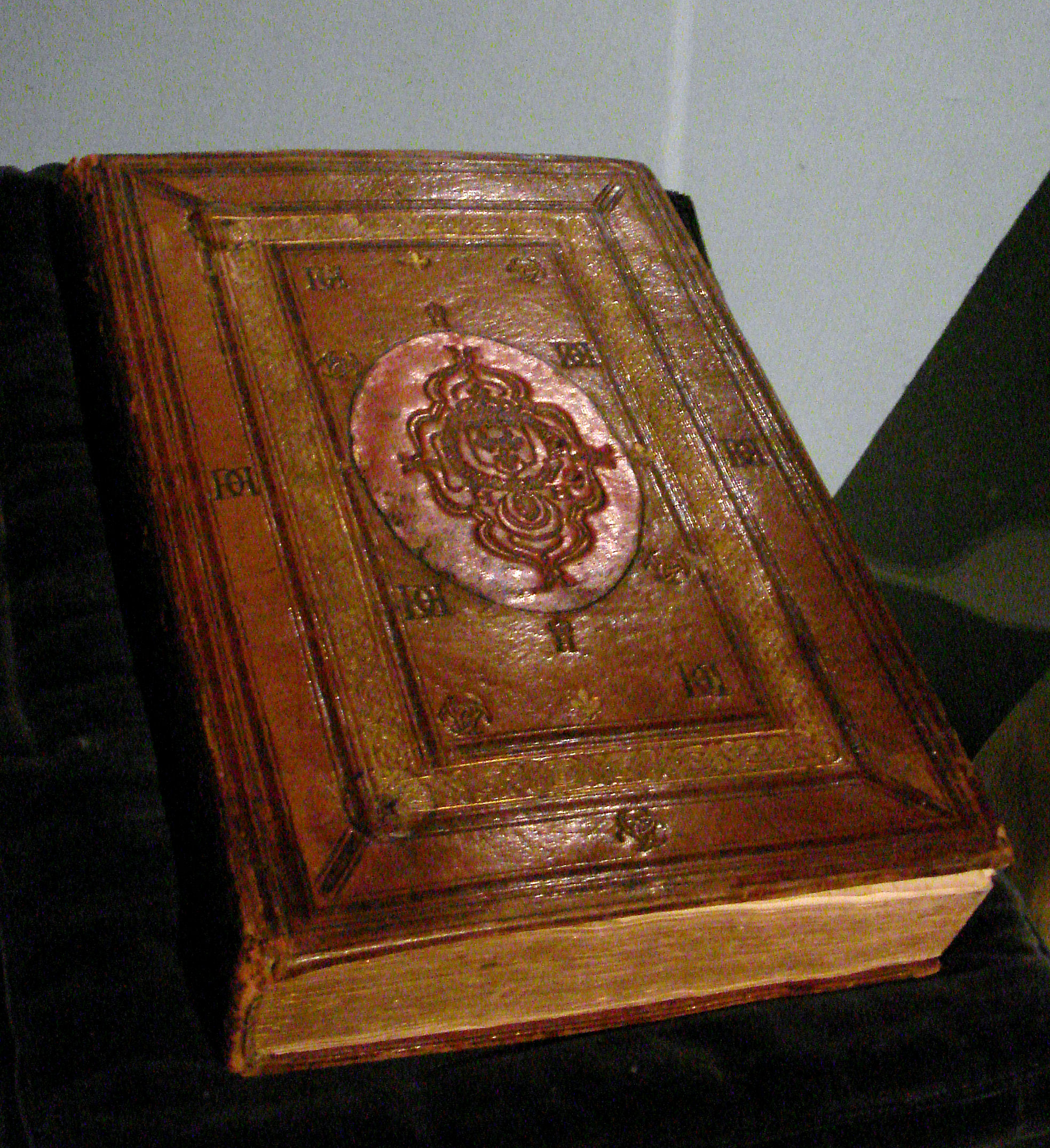
Ottoman Empire Qur'an, copied circa 1536, bound according to regulations set under Francis I circa 1549, with arms of Henri II. Bibliothèque nationale de France.

Guillaume Postel became the first French Orientalist after 1536, when he went to Constantinople as a member of the 12-strong French embassy of Jean de La Forêt to the Turkish sultan Suleiman the Magnificent. Postel brought back numerous books in Arabic, either religious or scientific in content (mainly mathematics and medicine), to France.

Scientific exchange is thought to have occurred, as numerous works in Arabic, especially pertaining to astronomy were brought back, annotated and studied by Postel. Transmission of scientific knowledge, such as the Tusi-couple, may have occurred on such occasions, at the time when Copernicus was establishing his own astronomical theories.

Guillaume Postel envisioned a world where Muslims, Christians and Jews would be united in harmony under one rule, a message he developed two decades before the Universalist Jean Bodin. He claimed that Islam was only a branch of Christianity, a simple heresy that could be reintegrated into Christianity, in his book Alcorani seu legis Mahometi et evangelistarum concordiae liber (1543).

Postel also studied languages and sought to identify the common origin of all languages, before Babel. He became Professor of Mathematics and Oriental Languages, as well as the first professor of Arabic, at the Collège royal.

== Second embassy to the Ottoman Empire (1547) ==
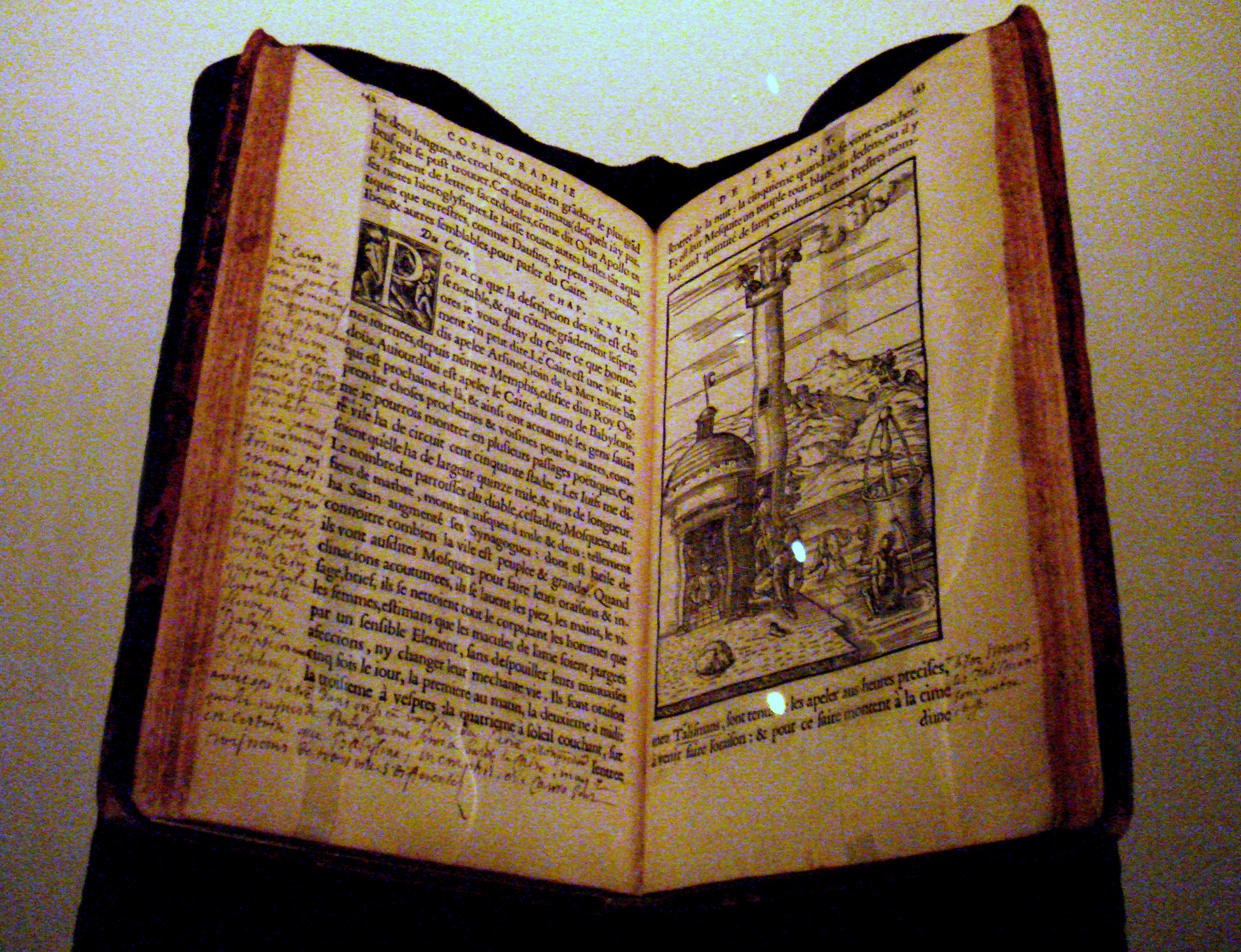
André Thévet, Cosmographie du Levant, 1556, Lyon

=== Scientific research ===
In 1547, a second embassy was sent by the French king to the Ottoman Empire, led by Gabriel de Luetz. The embassy included numerous scientists, such as the botanist Pierre Belon, naturalist Pierre Gilles d'Albi, the future cosmographer André Thévet, philosopher Guillaume Postel, traveller Nicolas de Nicolay, or the cleric and diplomat Jean de Monluc, who would publish their findings upon their return to France and contribute greatly to the early development of science in France.

=== Political studies ===
Knowledge of the Ottoman Empire allowed French philosophers to make comparative studies between the political systems of different nations. Jean Bodin, one of the first such theorists, declared his admiration for the power and administrative system of the Ottoman Empire. He presented as a model Turkish frugality, the Ottoman system of punishments for looting, and promotion on merit in the Janissaries. Such views would be echoed by 18th century comparative works such as L'Espion Turc or the Lettres persanes.

=== The arts ===
French novels and tragedies were written with the Ottoman Empire as a theme or background. In 1561, Gabriel Bounin published La Soltane, a tragedy highlighting the role of Roxelane in the 1553 execution of Mustapha, the elder son of Suleiman. This tragedy marks the first time the Ottomans were introduced on stage in France. Turquerie and chinoiserie were notable fashions that affected a wide range of the decorative arts.

== Oriental studies ==
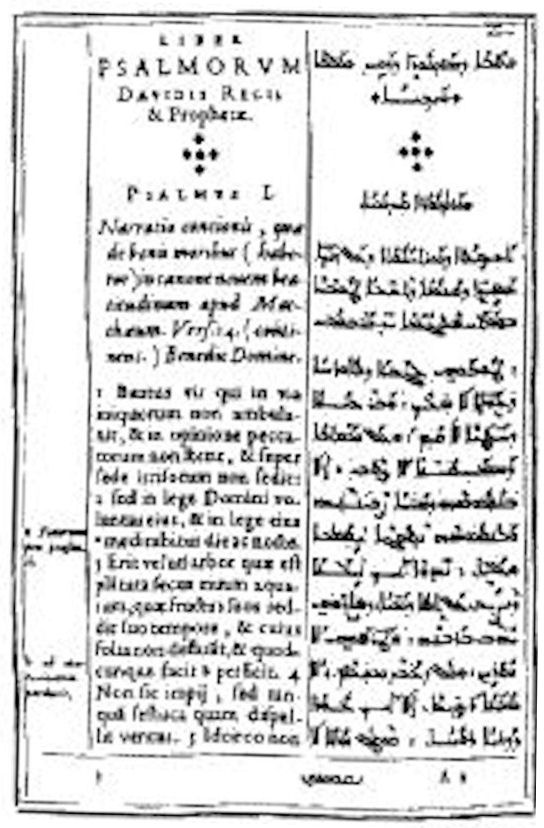
Latin-Syriac psalter by Gabriel Sionita, 1625, printed by Antoine Vitré with the fonts of François Savary de Brèves

Oriental studies continued to take place towards the end of the 16th century, especially with the work of Savary de Brèves, also former French ambassador in Constantinople. Brèves spoke Turkish and Arabic and was famed for his knowledge of Ottoman culture. Through his efforts, Capitulations were signed between Henry IV of France and Sultan Ahmed I on 20 May 1604, giving a marked advantage for French trade, against that of the English and the Venetians. In these capitulations, the protection of the French king over Jerusalem and the Holy Land is also recognized. Brèves was interested in establishing an Arabic printing press under his own account in order to introduce Oriental studies in France. He had Arabic, Turk, Persian and Syriac types cast while in Istanbul. He also brought to France a large collection of Oriental manuscripts. These excellent types, followed those of Guillaume Le Bé at the end of the 16th century.

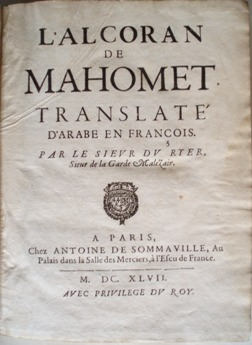
The first Qur'an to be translated into a vernacular language: L'Alcoran de Mahomet, André du Ryer, 1647.

While in Rome he set up a publishing house, the Typographia Savariana, through which he printed a Latin-Arab bilingual edition of a catechism of Cardinal Bellarmino in 1613, as well as in 1614 an Arabic version of the Book of Psalms. For the editorial work and the translations, Brèves used the services of two Lebanese Maronite priests, former students of the Maronite College, Gabriel Sionita (Jibrā'īl aṣ-Ṣahyūnī) and Victor Scialac (Naṣrallāh Shalaq al-'Āqūrī).

In 1610–11, Al-Hajari, a Moroccan envoy to France, met with the Orientalist Thomas Erpenius in September 1611 in Paris, and taught him some Classical Arabic. Through the introduction of Erpenius, Al-Hajari also met with the French Arabist Étienne Hubert d'Orléans, who had been a court physician for Moroccan ruler Ahmad al-Mansur in Marrakesh from 1598 to 1601.

A protégé of Savary de Brèves, André du Ryer published the first ever translation of the Qur'an in a vernacular language, L'Alcoran de Mahomet (1647), and published in the West the first piece of Persian literature Gulistan (1634).

According to McCabe, Orientalism played a key role "in the birth of science and in the creation of the French Academy of Sciences".

== Development of trade ==
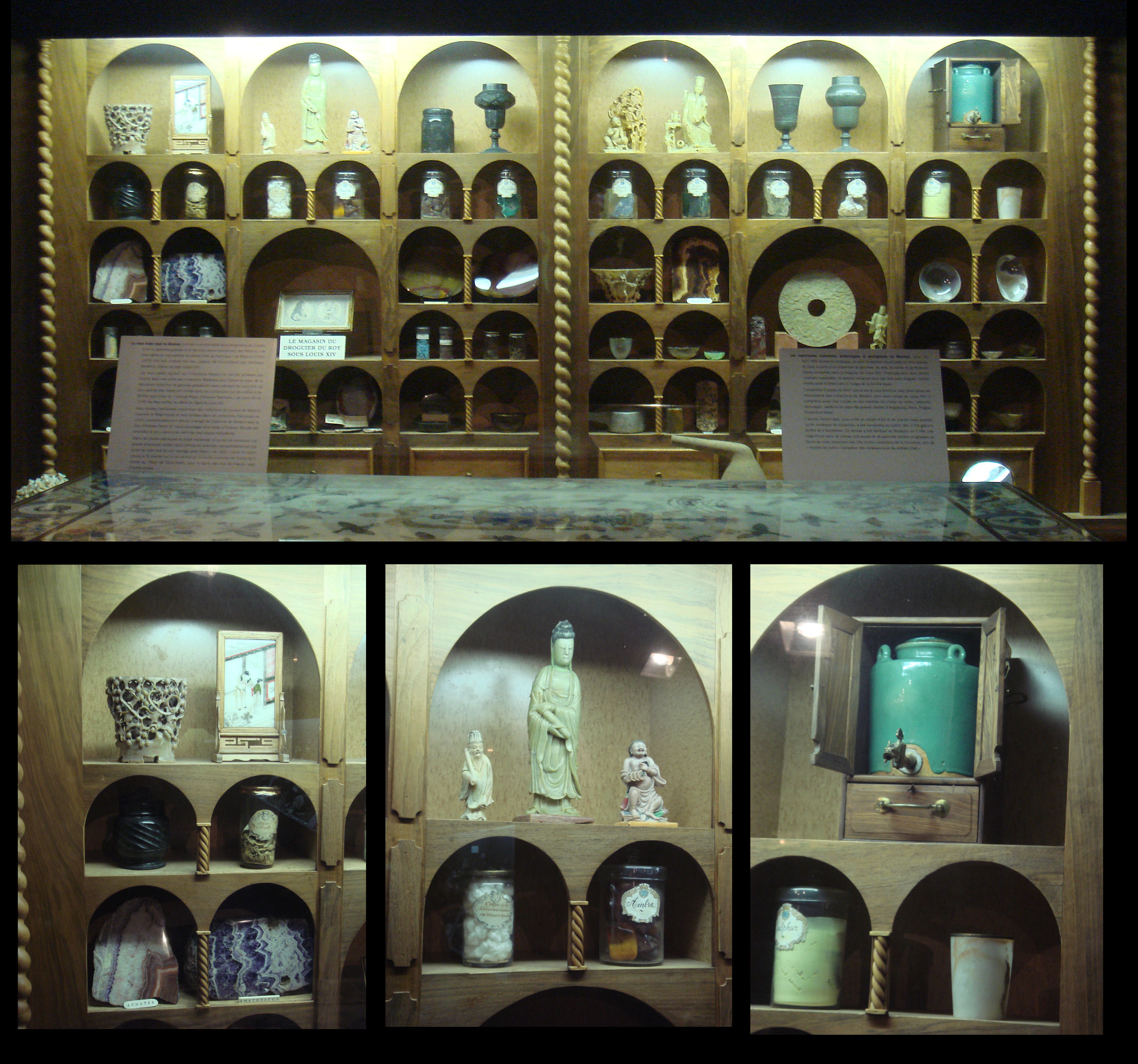
Drugstore of Louis XIV, with numerous oriental artefacts. Muséum national d'histoire naturelle, Paris.

France started to set up numerous consulates throughout the Ottoman realm, in Tripoli, Beirut, Alexandria, and Chios. Intense trade also started to develop, centered on the city of Marseille, called "the door of the Orient". In Egypt, French trade was paramount, and Marseille was importing in large quantities linens, carpets, dyes, hides, leather, or waxes. In 1682, the Sultan of Morocco, Moulay Ismail, following the embassy of Mohammed Tenim, allowed consular and commercial establishments, and again in 1699 ambassador Abdallah bin Aisha was sent to Louis XIV.

=== Coffee drinking ===
An Ottoman embassy was sent to Louis XIII in 1607, and from Mehmed IV to Louis XIV in 1669 in the person of ambassador Müteferrika Süleyman Ağa, who created a sensation at the French court and triggered a fashion for things Turkish. The Orient came to have a strong influence in French literature, as about 50% of French travel guides in the 16th century were dedicated to the Ottoman Empire.

In Paris, Suleiman set up a house where he offered coffee to Parisian society, with waiters dressed in Ottoman style, triggering enthusiastic responses, and starting the fashion for coffee-drinking. Fashionable coffee-shops emerged such as the famous Café Procope, the first coffee-shop of Paris, in 1689. In the French high society wearing turbans and caftans became fashionable, as well as lying on rugs and cushions.

== Manufacture of "Oriental" luxury goods in France ==
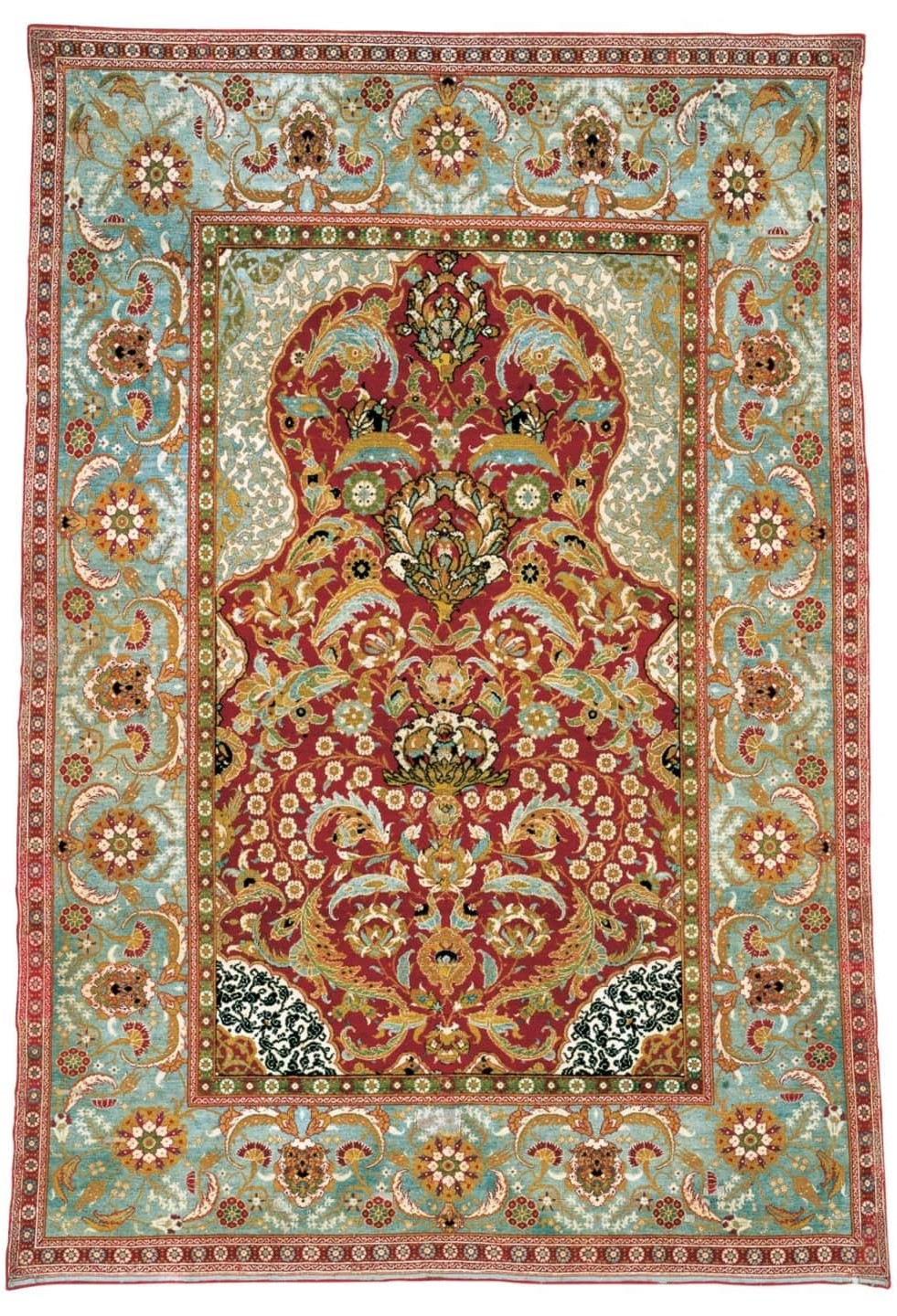
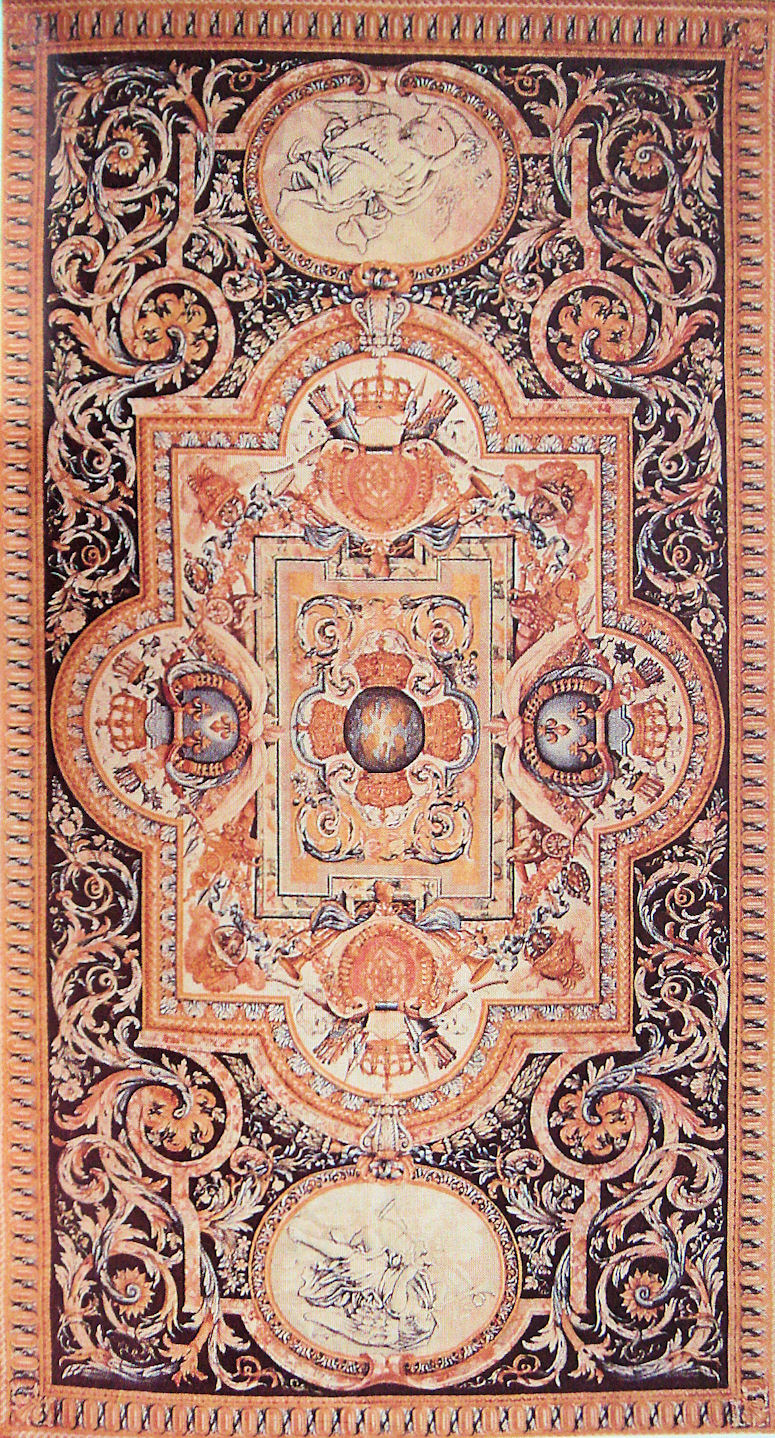
Left image: Ottoman court carpet, late 16th century, Egypt or Turkey.
Right image: French adaptation: Savonnerie manufactory, under Louis XIV, after Charles Le Brun, made for the Grande Galerie in the Louvre Palace.

The establishment of strong diplomatic and commercial relations with the Ottoman Empire through the Capitulations led to French money being drained to the Levant and Persia for the purchase of luxury goods such as knotted-pile carpets. Due to these concerns, and also because French luxury arts had collapsed in the disorders of civil violence in the Wars of Religion, Henri IV attempted to develop French luxury industries that could replace imports. The king provided craftsmen with studios and workshops. These efforts to develop an industry for luxury goods was continued by Louis XIII and Louis XIV.

=== Silk manufacturing ===
Henry IV made the earliest attempt at producing substitutes for luxury goods from the Orient. He experimented with planting mulberry trees in the garden of the Palais des Tuileries. Ultimately, silk manufacturing would become one of the major industries of France into the 19th century, and one of the major reasons for the development of France-Japan relations in the 19th century.

During the 17th century, from being an importer, France became a net exporter of silk, for example shipping 30,000 pounds sterling worth of silk to England in 1674 alone.

=== Turkish carpet-making ===
The Savonnerie manufactory was the most prestigious European manufactory of knotted-pile carpets, enjoying its greatest period circa 1650–1685. The manufactory had its immediate origins in a carpet manufactory established in a former soap factory (French: savon) on the Quai de Chaillot downstream of Paris in 1615 by Pierre DuPont, who was returning from the Levant and wrote La Stromatourgie, ou Traité de la Fabrication des tapis de Turquie ("Treaty on the manufacture of Turkish carpets", Paris 1632). Under a patent (privilège) of eighteen years, a monopoly was granted by Louis XIII in 1627 to Pierre Dupont and his former apprentice Simon Lourdet, makers of carpets façon de Turquie ("in the manner of Turkey"). Until 1768, the products of the manufactory remained exclusively the property of the Crown, and "Savonnerie carpets" were among the grandest of French diplomatic gifts.

=== Chinese porcelain ===
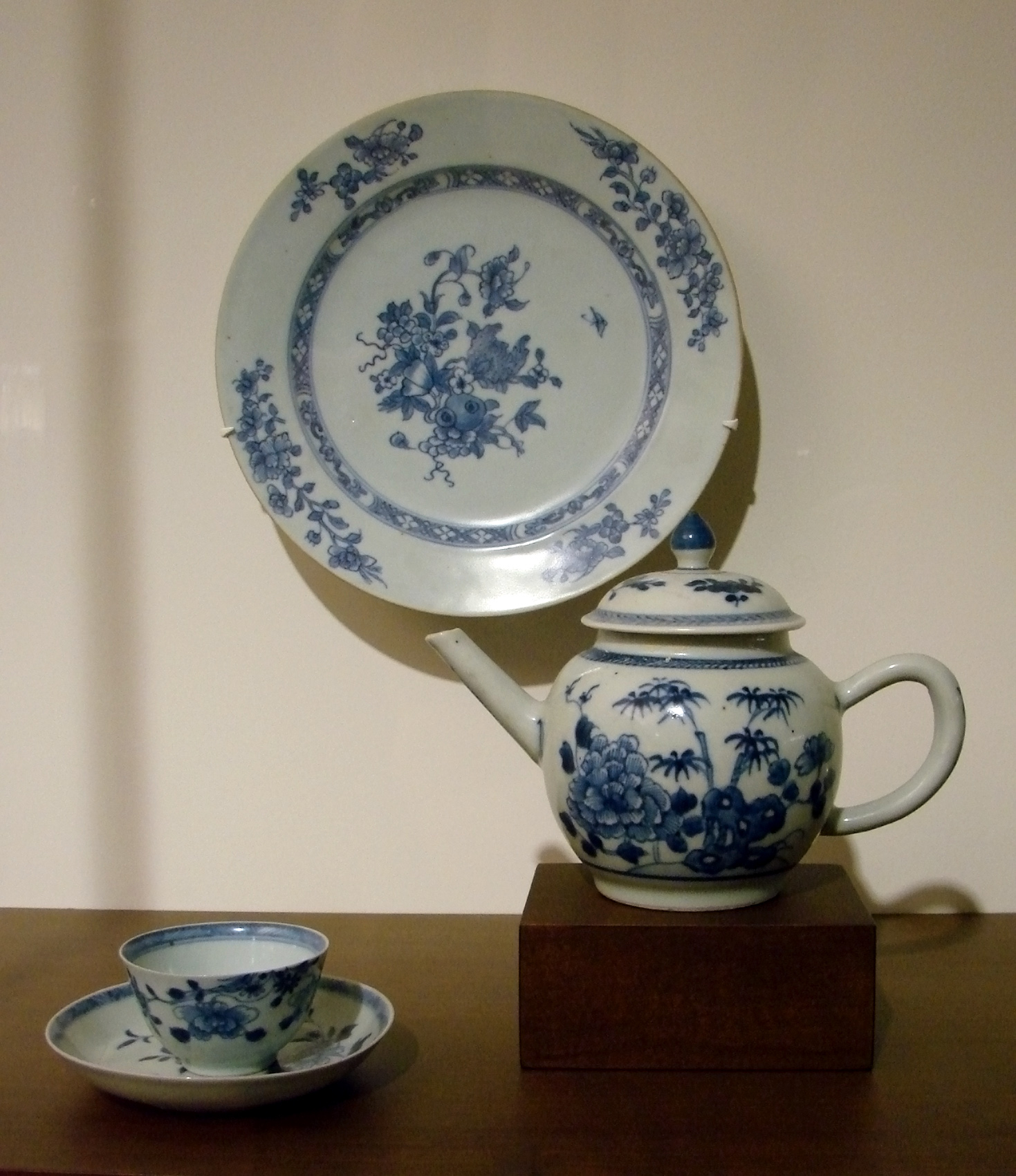
18th century Chinese export porcelain, Guimet Museum, Paris

Chinese porcelain had long been imported from China, and was a very expensive and desired luxury. Huge amounts of gold were sent from Europe to China to pay for the desired Chinese porcelain wares, and numerous attempts were made to duplicate the material. It is at the Nevers manufactory that Chinese-style blue and white wares were produced for the first time in France, using the faience technique, with production running between 1650 and 1680.

Chinese porcelain was collected at the French court from the time of Francis I. Colbert set up the Royal Factory of Saint-Cloud in 1664 in order to make copies (In the original "Contre-façons", i.e. "Fakes") of "Indian-style" porcelain.

France was one of the first European countries to produce soft-paste porcelain, and specifically frit porcelain, at the Rouen manufactory in 1673, which was known for this reason as "Porcelaine française". These were developed in an effort to imitate high-valued Chinese hard-paste porcelain.

France however, only discovered the Chinese technique of hard-paste porcelain through the efforts of the Jesuit Father Francois Xavier d'Entrecolles between 1712 and 1722. Louis XIV had received 1,500 pieces of porcelain from the Siamese Embassy to France in 1686, but the manufacturing secret had remained elusive. The English porcelain-manufacturer Josiah Wedgwood may also have been influenced by the letter of Father d'Entrecolles and his description of Chinese mass-production methods. After this initial period, until the end of the 18th century, French porcelain manufactories would progressively abandon their Chinese designs, to become more French in character.

=== Textiles: Siamoises and Indiennes ===
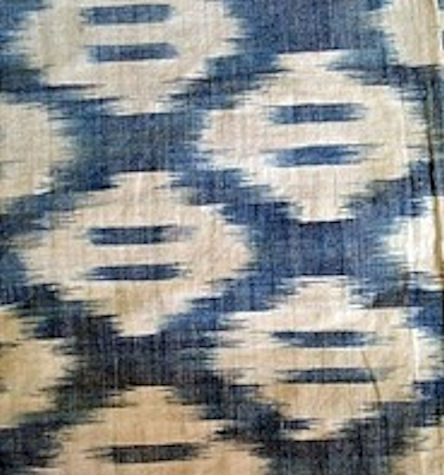
Siamoise flammée textile, derived from Thai Ikat, French manufacture, 18th century

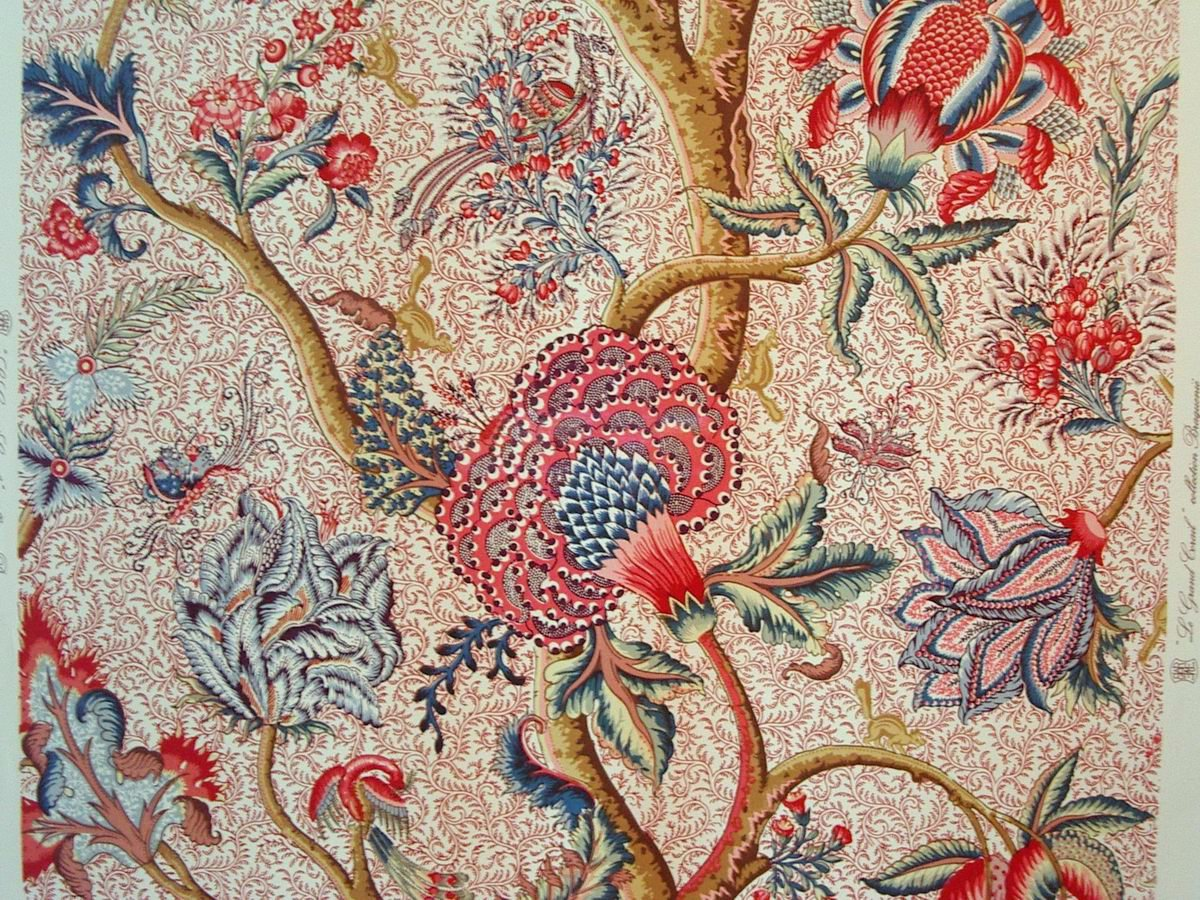
An Indienne, a printed or painted textile in the manner of Indian productions

The Siamese Embassy to France in 1686 had brought to the Court samples of multicolor Thai Ikat textiles. These were enthusiastically adopted by the French nobility to become Toiles flammées or Siamoises de Rouen, often with checkered blue-and-white designs. After the French Revolution and its dislike for foreign luxury, the textiles were named "Toiles des Charentes" or cottons of Provence.

Textiles imported from India, types of colored calicoes which were called Indiennes, were also widely adopted and manufactured, especially in Marseille, although there were difficulties in obtaining comparable dyes, especially the red dye madder.

=== Literature ===
French literature also was greatly influenced. The first French version of One Thousand and One Nights was published in 1704. French authors used the East as a way to enrich their philosophical work, and a pretext to write commentaries on the West: Montesquieu wrote the Lettres persanes, a satirical essay on the West, in 1721, and Voltaire used the Oriental appeal to write Zaïre (1732) and Candide (1759). French travellers of the 17th century, such as Jean de Thévenot or Jean-Baptiste Tavernier routinely visited the Ottoman Empire.

By that time, the Confucian canon had already been translated into Latin by Jesuit missionaries to China's Ming and Qing Empires. Michele Ruggieri's work in the 1580s remained long unpublished but Matteo Ricci and Nicolas Trigault's work On the Christian Expedition... (Augsburg, 1615), Philippe Couplet and others' Confucius, Philosopher of the Chinese (Paris, 1687), François Noël's Six Classics of the Chinese Empire (Prague, 1711), and Jean-Baptiste Du Halde's Description of China (Paris, 1735) all spoke in glowing terms of the moral and cultural achievements of the Chinese, supposedly reached through the use of reason. It is thought that such works had considerable importance on European thinkers of the period, particularly among the Deists and other philosophical groups of the Enlightenment.

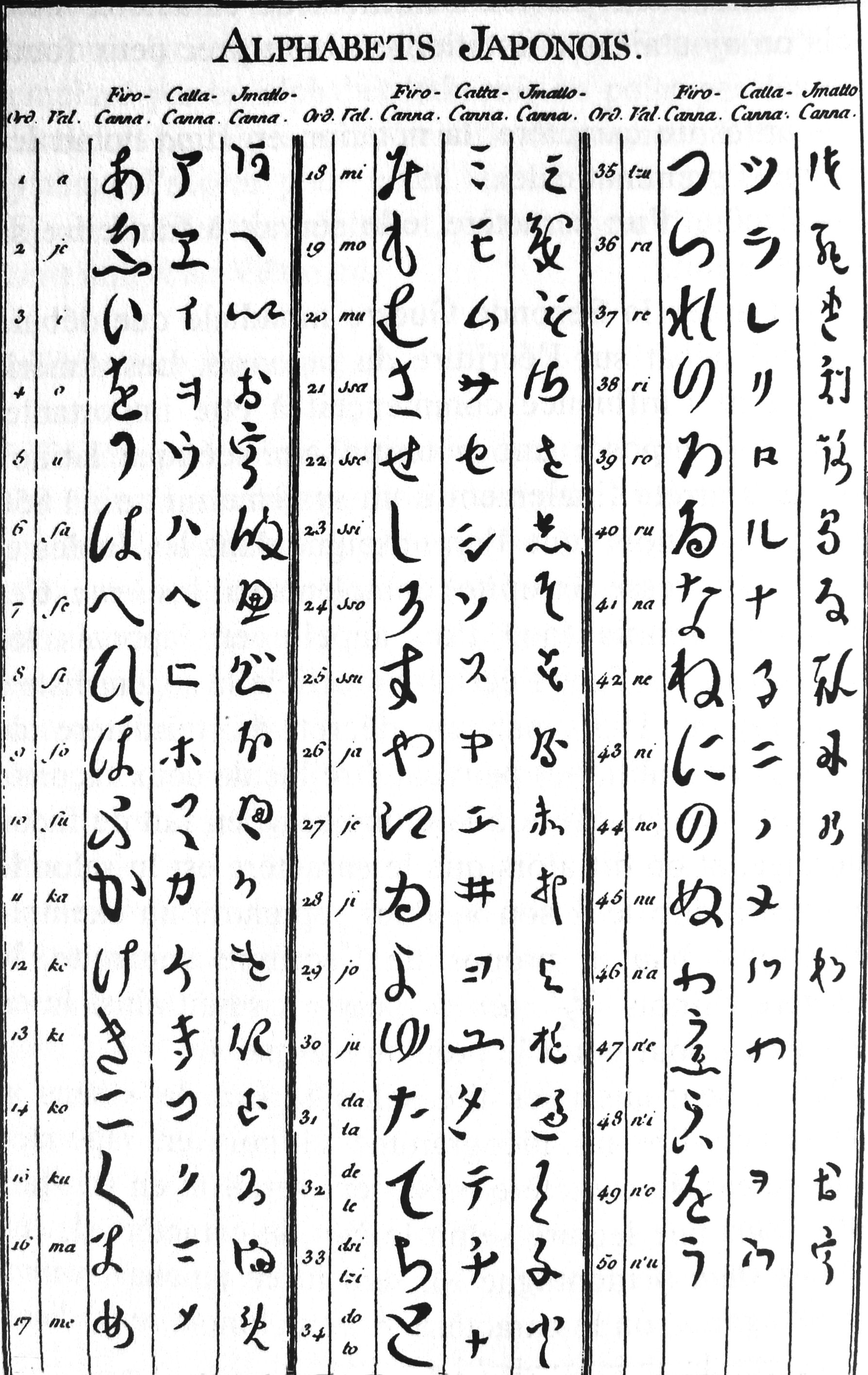
Japanese alphabets, including Hiragana, Katakana, and "Imatto-canna". Denis Diderot, Encyclopédie, 18th century.

In particular, cultural diversity with respect to religious beliefs could no longer be ignored. As Herbert wrote in On Lay Religion (De Religione Laici, 1645):

Many faiths or religions, clearly, exist or once existed in various countries and ages, and certainly there is not one of them that the lawgivers have not pronounced to be as it were divinely ordained, so that the Wayfarer finds one in Europe, another in Africa, and in Asia, still another in the very Indies.

Starting with Grosrichard, analogies were also made between the harem, the Sultan's court, oriental despotism, luxury, gems and spices, carpets, and silk cushions with the luxury and vices of France's own monarchy.

=== Visual arts ===
By the end of the 17th century, the first major defeats of the Ottoman Empire reduced the perceived threat in European minds, which led to an artistic craze for things Turkish, Turquerie, just as there was a fashion for Chinese things with Chinoiserie, both of which became constitutive components of the Rococo style. Orientalism started to become hugely popular, first with the works of Jean-Baptiste van Mour, who had accompanied the embassy of Charles de Ferriol to Istanbul 1699 and stayed there until the end of his life in 1737, and later with the works of François Boucher and Jean-Honoré Fragonard.

== Cultural impact ==
According to historian McCabe, early orientalism profoundly shaped French culture and gave it many of its modern characteristics. In the area of science, she stressed "the role of Orientalism in the birth of science and in the creation of the French Academy of Sciences". In the artistic area, referring to Louis XIV's fashion efforts that contrasted with the contemporary fashion for austere Spanish dress: "ironically, endorsing oriental sartorial splendor at court gave rise to the creation of 'Frenchness' through fashion, which became an umbrella definition that broke through the class barrier".

== Gallery ==
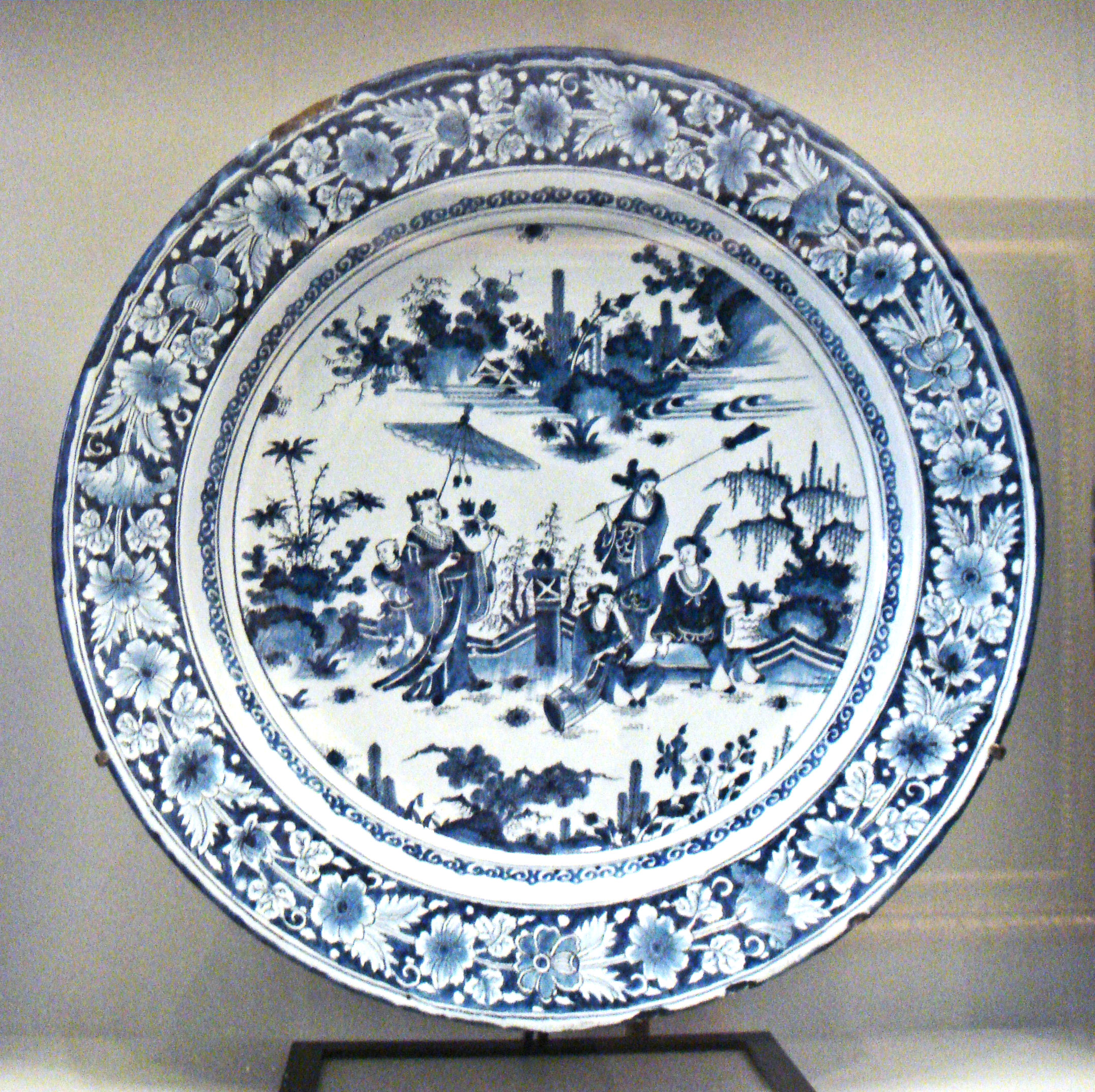
French adaptation: Blue and white porcelain with Chinese scene, Nevers faience, 1680–1700

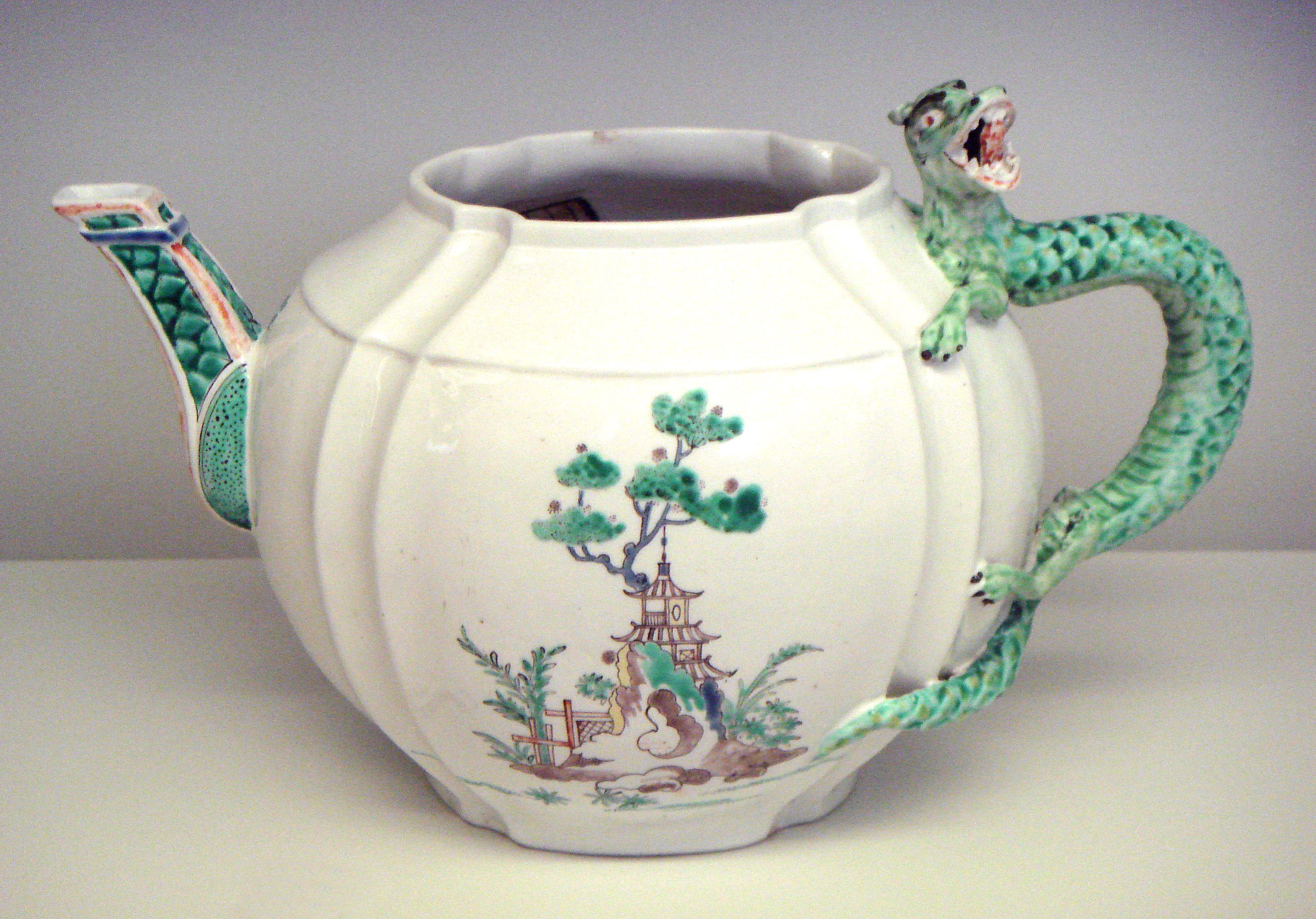
Chantilly soft-paste porcelain teapot, 1735–1740

Woman in dress made of Siamoise ("Siamese") textile, 1687

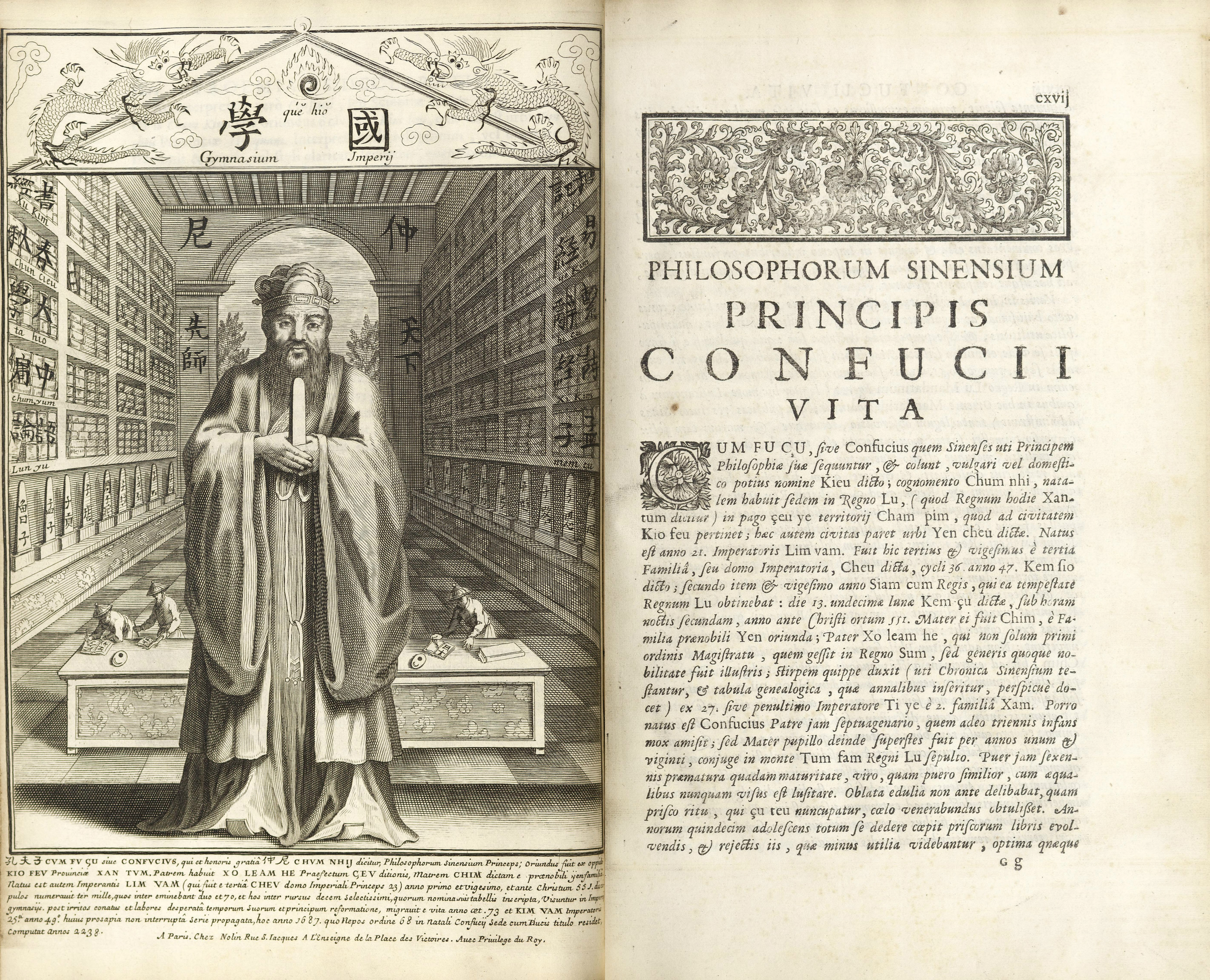
Confucius, Philosopher of the Chinese, or, Chinese Knowledge Explained in Latin, an introduction to Chinese history and philosophy published at Paris in 1687 by a team of Jesuits working under Philippe Couplet

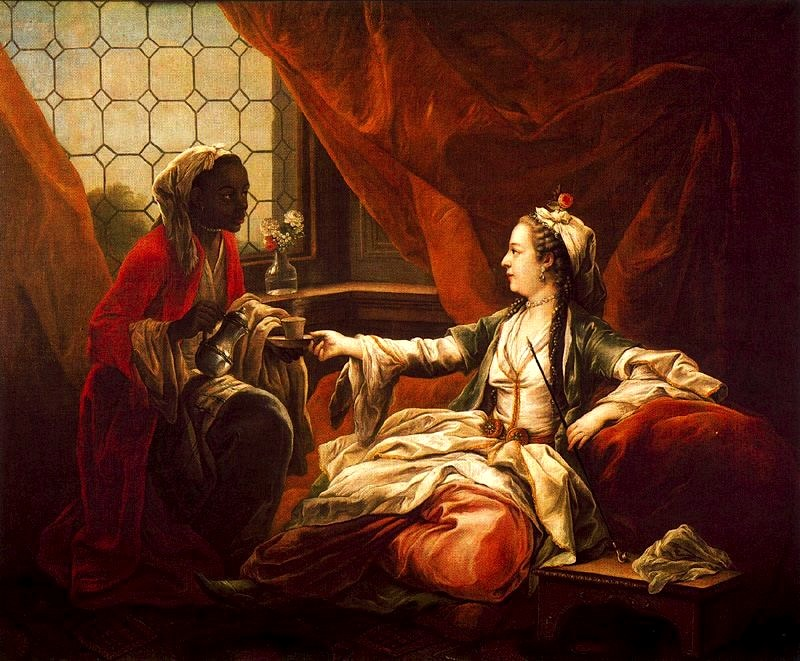
Madame de Pompadour portrayed as a Turkish lady in 1747 by Charles André van Loo, an example of Turquerie

== See also ==
- France-Asia relations
- Felix Thomas
- Julius Oppert
- Orientalism
- Société des Peintres Orientalistes Français (Society for French Orientalist Painters)
- Turquerie
