= François Savary de Brèves =

French ambassador and Orientalist

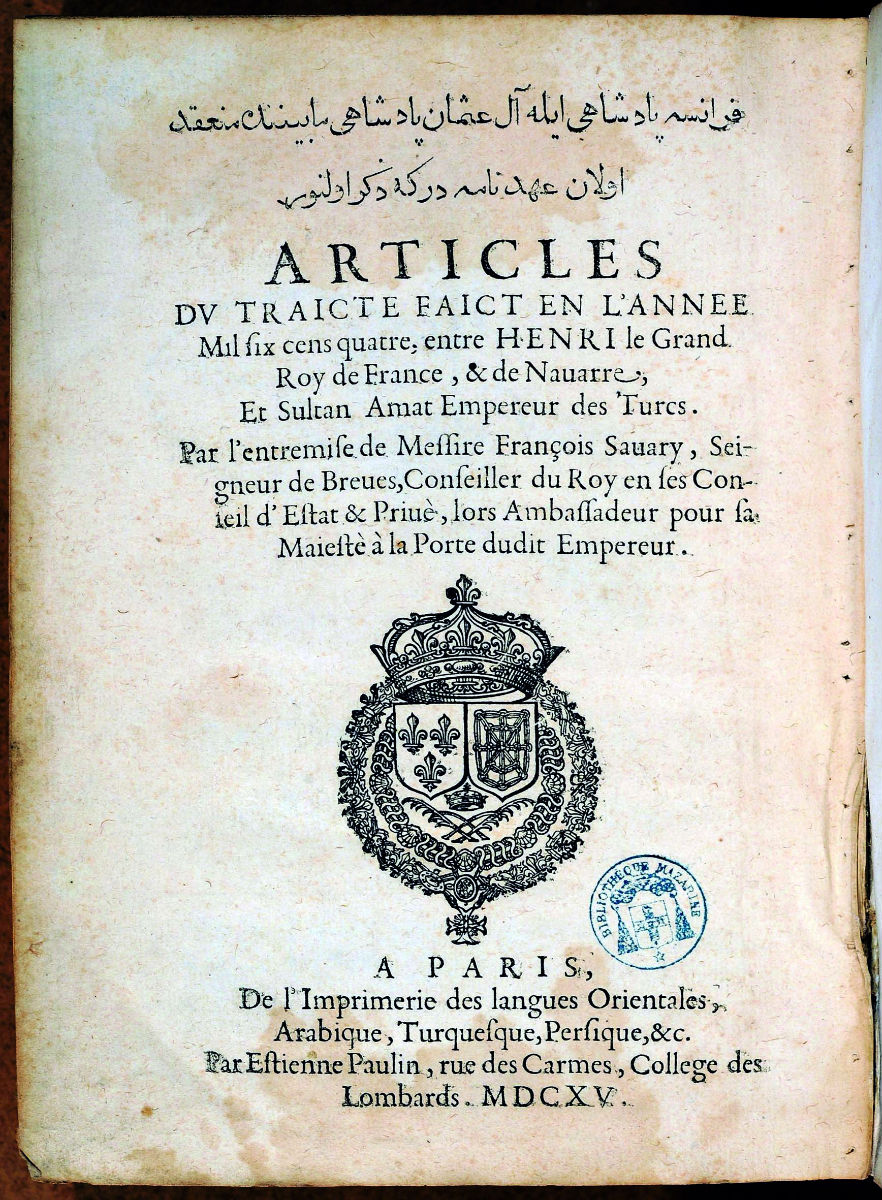
Bilingual Franco-Turkish translation of the 1604 Franco-Ottoman Capitulations between Sultan Ahmed I and Henry IV, published by Savary de Brèves in 1615.

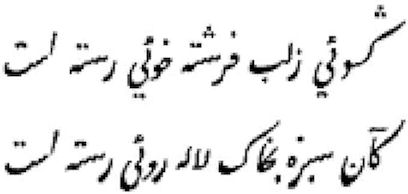
Persian characters developed by Savary de Brèves.

François Savary de Brèves (1560 in Melay – 22 April 1628 in Paris) was a French ambassador of the 16th and 17th centuries as well as an Orientalist.

== Diplomacy ==
In 1585, François Savary de Brèves accompanied to Constantinople his relative Jacques Savary de Lancosme, who became ambassador to the Porte. Savary de Lancosme associated himself with the Ligue and refused to recognize Henry IV of France, leading to his imprisonment by the Ottomans and the nomination of Savary de Brèves as interim ambassador.

From 1591 to 1605, Savary de Brèves was French ambassador to the Ottoman Court in Constantinople. He tried to incite the Sultan to wage war against Philip II and to limit the activities of Barbary pirates on the French coasts of Provence, but in vain, leading to tense relations between France and the Porte.

Savary de Brèves spoke Turkish and Arabic and was famed for his knowledge of Ottoman culture. Through his efforts, Capitulations were signed between Henry IV of France and Sultan Ahmed I on 20 May 1604, giving a marked advantage for French trade, against that of the English and the Venetians. In these capitulations, the protection of the French king over Jerusalem and the Holy Land is also recognized. These contact stemmed from the Franco-Ottoman alliance developed between France and the Ottoman Empire under Francis I of France.

In 1607, Savary de Brèves became ambassador to Rome. He married Anne de Thou, a relative of historian Jacques Auguste de Thou in 1607.

Savary de Brèves was then sent to Tunisia in 1608 by Henry IV of France.

In 1609, he became French Consul at Alexandria in Egypt.

After that, from 1615, he became governor to the King's brother, the Duke of Anjou, until he fell out of favour in 1618.

== Oriental studies ==
Savary de Brèves was interested in establishing an Arabic printing press under his own account in order to introduce Oriental studies in France. He had Arabic, Turk, Persian and Syriac types cast in Italy. He also brought to France a large collection of Oriental manuscripts. These excellent types, followed those of Guillaume Le Bé at the end of the 16th century.

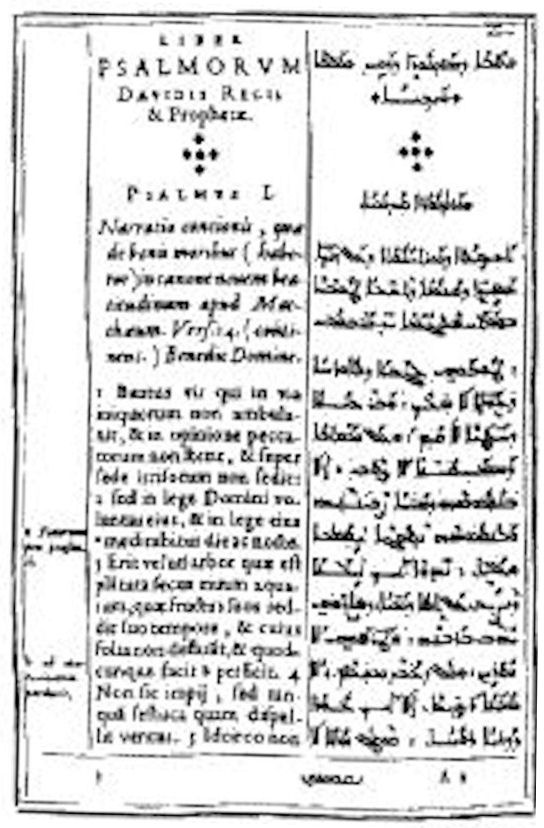
Latin-Syriac psalter by Gabriel Sionita, 1625, printed by Antoine Vitré with the fonts of François Savary de Brèves.

While in Rome he set up a publishing house, the Typographia Savariana, through which he printed a Latin-Arab bilingual edition of a catechism of Cardinal Bellarmino in 1613, as well as in 1614 an Arabic version of the Book of Psalms. For the editorial work and the translations, Brèves used the services of two Lebanese Maronite priests, former students of the Maronite College, Gabriel Sionita (Jibrā'īl aṣ-Ṣahyūnī) and Victor Scialac (Naṣrallāh Shalaq al-'Āqūrī).

In Paris, accompanied by an additional Maronite priest Johannes Hesronita (Yūḥannā al-Ḥaṣrūnī), he published the first part of a Grammatica Arabica maronitarum.

Savary de Breves also attempted to establish an Oriental college in Paris, but failed for lack of funds. He succeeded however in obtaining Royal pensions for Sionita and Scialac, as interpreters and professors of Arabic and Syriac at the Collège Royal.

Savary de Brèves' Arabic types would continue to be used by other printers of Arabic text in Paris, such as Antoine Vitré, the King's printer for Oriental languages (Linguarum Orientalium Regis Typographus), long after this death. From 1625, they were used to print the Paris Polyglot Bible printed by Antoine Vitré and edited by Guy Michel Lejay in 1645, which embraces the first printed texts of the Syriac Old Testament edited by Gabriel Sionita, the Book of Ruth by Abraham Ecchellensis, also a Maronite, the Samaritan Pentateuch and a version by Jean Morin (Morinus).

After the death of Savary de Brèves in 1627, the types were acquired by Richelieu for the kingdom of France in order to encourage the propagation of Catholicism in the Levant, and prevent such a tool to fall into Huguenot hands.

Savary de Brèves was also an inspiration for Thomas van Erpe.

Savary de Brèves' types were transferred to the Imprimerie Royale in 1656, and printing in Arabic was discontinued in France for the rest of the 17th century and most of the 18th century. Brèves' types were rescued from oblivion when they were reused by Joseph de Guignes in 1787.

== Works ==
- Relation des voyages tant en Grèce, Turquie et Aegypte..., Paris, 1628
- Discours sur l’alliance qu’a le roi avec le Grand Seigneur

Diplomatic posts
Preceded by Jacques Savary de Lancosme	French Ambassador to the Ottoman Empire; 1591–1605	Succeeded by Jean-François de Gontaut-Biron

== See also ==
- France-Asia relations
- Guillaume Postel
- Medici Oriental Press
