= Antoine Vitré =

French printer

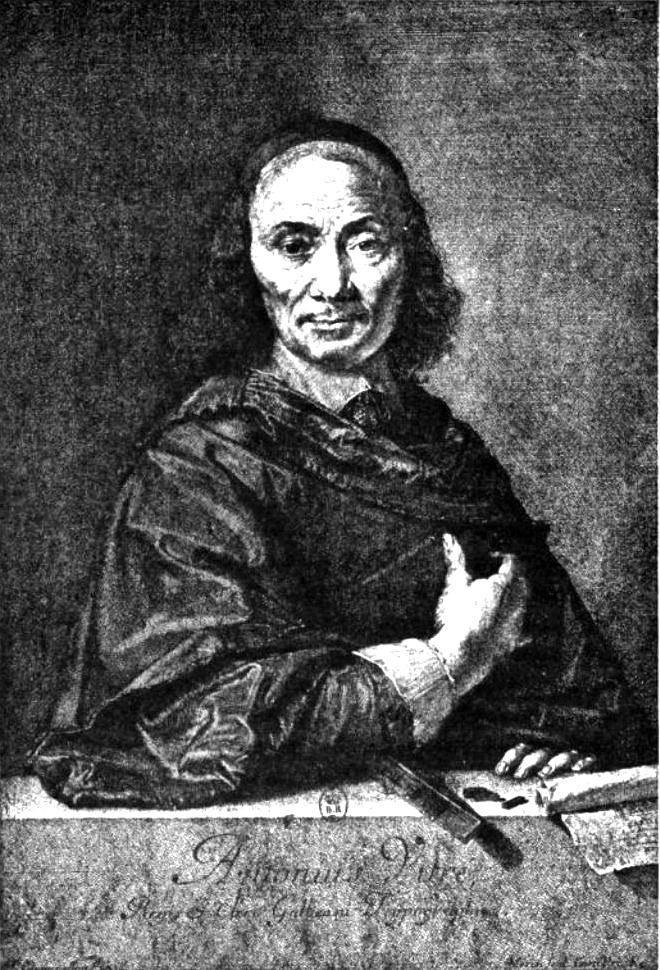
Antoine Vitré.

Antoine Vitré (1595–1674) was a French printer of the 17th century. He was the King's printer for Oriental languages (Linguarum Orientalium Regis Typographus).

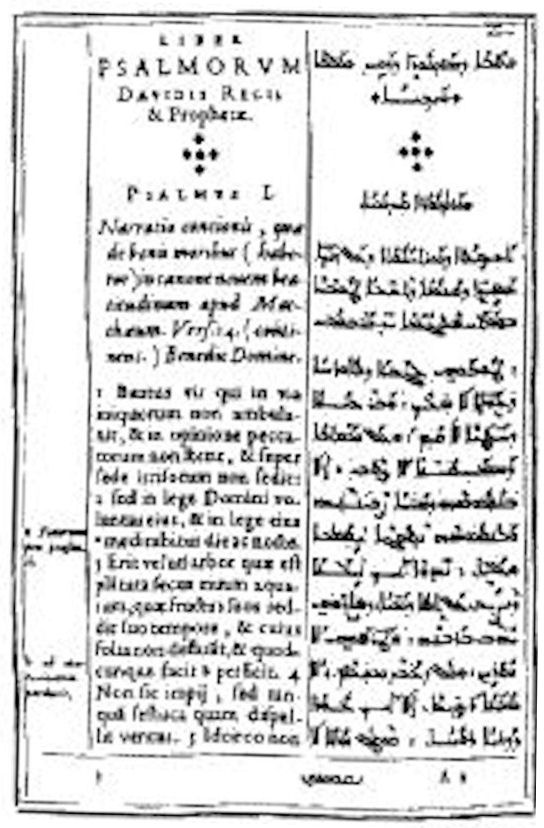
Latin-Syriac psalter by Gabriel Sionita, 1625, printed by Antoine Vitré with the fonts of François Savary de Brèves.

Antoine Vitré printed several works with Arabic font types, using the fonts developed by François Savary de Brèves. From 1625, Antoine Vitré used these types to print the Paris Polyglot Bible printed by Antoine Vitré and edited by Guy Michel Lejay in 1645, which embraces the first printed texts of the Syriac Old Testament edited by Gabriel Sionita, the Book of Ruth by Abraham Ecchellensis, also a Maronite, the Samaritan Pentateuch and a version by Jean Morin (Morinus).

== Printed works ==
- Le Broiement des moulins des Rochellois, 1621
- Dictionarium latino-arabicum, by Jean-Baptiste Du Val, 1622
- Psautier in Syriac and Latin, 1625
- Corpus juris avilis by Denys Godefroy, 1628
- Bible polyglotte, 1645
