= Masius =

Masius may refer to:

- Mons Masius, mountain range in Turkey
- Masius (genus), monotypic genus of bird
- Masius (surname)

== See also ==
- D'Arcy Masius Benton & Bowles, former American advertising agency
