= Oriental studies =

Study of Asian history and culture

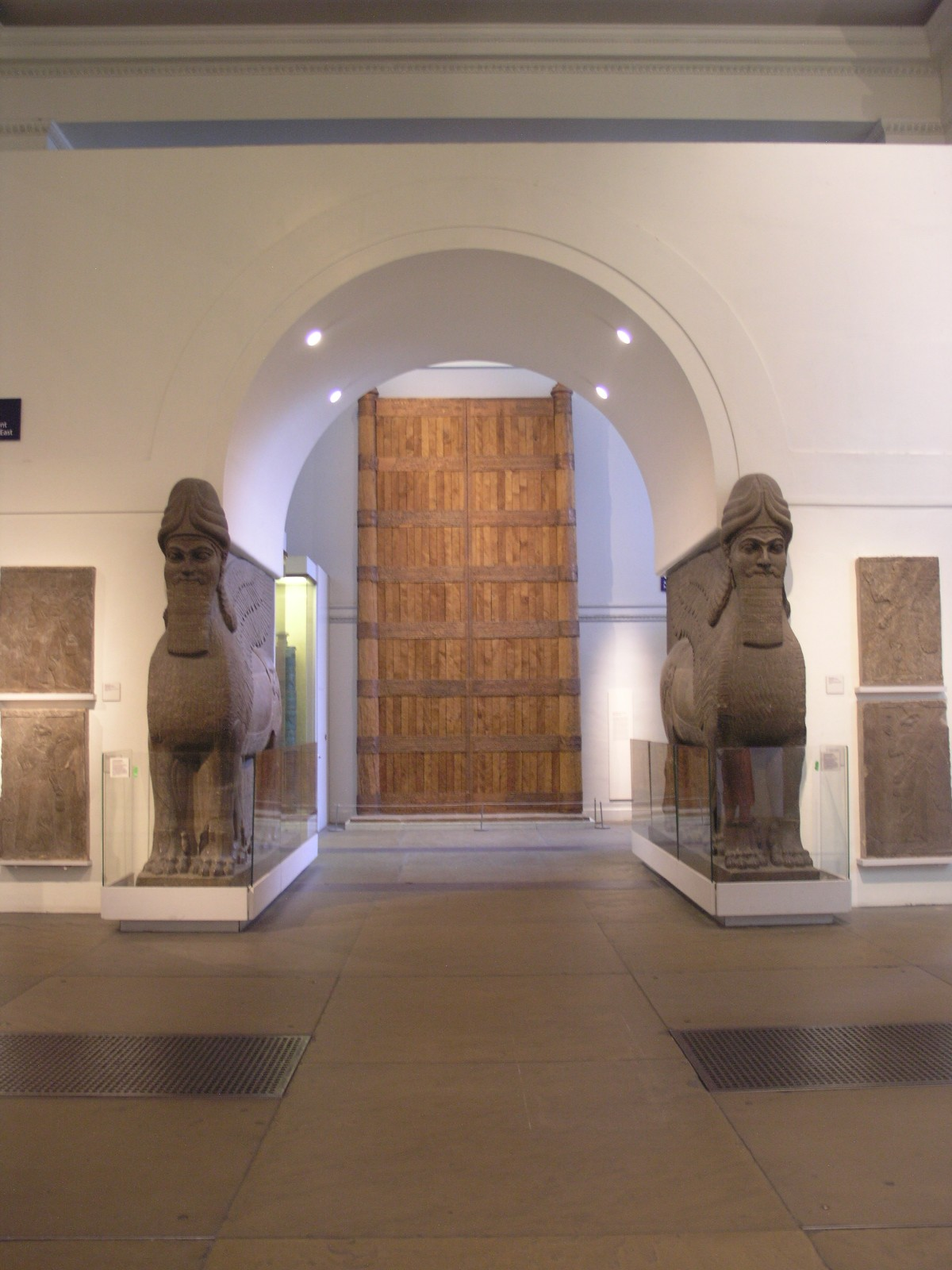
Ancient Assyrian antiquities in the British Museum. In the 19th century, the placing of spectacular antiquities in the new museums brought unusual interest from the general public to Oriental studies.

Oriental studies is the academic field that studies Near Eastern and Far Eastern societies and cultures, languages, peoples, history and archaeology. In recent years, the subject has often been turned into the newer terms of Middle Eastern studies and Asian studies. Traditional Oriental studies in Europe is today generally focused on the discipline of Islamic studies; the study of China, especially traditional China, is often called sinology. The study of East Asia in general, especially in the United States, is often called East Asian studies.

The European study of the region formerly known as "the Orient" had primarily religious origins, which have remained an important motivation until recent times. That is partly since the Abrahamic religions in Europe (Christianity, Judaism, and Islam) originated in the Middle East and because of the rise of Islam in the 7th century. Consequently, there was much interest in the origin of those faiths and of Western culture in general.

Learning from medieval Arabic medicine and philosophy and Greek translations into Arabic were important factors during the Middle Ages. Linguistic knowledge preceded a wider study of cultures and history, and as Europe began to expand its influence in the region, political and economic factors encouraged growth in its academic study. In the late 18th century, archaeology became a link from the discipline to the wider European public, as artefacts brought back through a variety of means went on display in museums throughout Europe.

According to Edward Said, modern Oriental studies were strongly influenced by imperialistic attitudes and interests, as well as by the fascination of Mediterranean and European writers and thinkers for the "exotic East". Captured in images by artists, this was embodied in a repeatedly surfacing theme in the history of ideas in the West called "Orientalism". Since the 20th century, scholars from the region itself have participated on equal terms in the discipline.

== History ==
=== Before Islam ===
The original distinction between the "West" and the "East" was crystalized by the Greco-Persian Wars in the 5th century BC, when Athenian historians made a distinction between their "Athenian democracy" and the Persian monarchy. An institutional distinction between East and West did not exist as a defined polarity before the Oriens- and Occidens-divided administration of Roman Emperor Diocletian in the late 3rd century AD, and the division of the Roman Empire into portions that spoke Latin and Greek. The classical world had an intimate knowledge of its Ancient Persian neighbours (and usually enemies) but very imprecise knowledge of most of the world farther east, including the "Seres" (Chinese). However, there was a substantial direct Roman trade with India, unlike that with China, during the Roman Empire.

=== Middle Ages ===
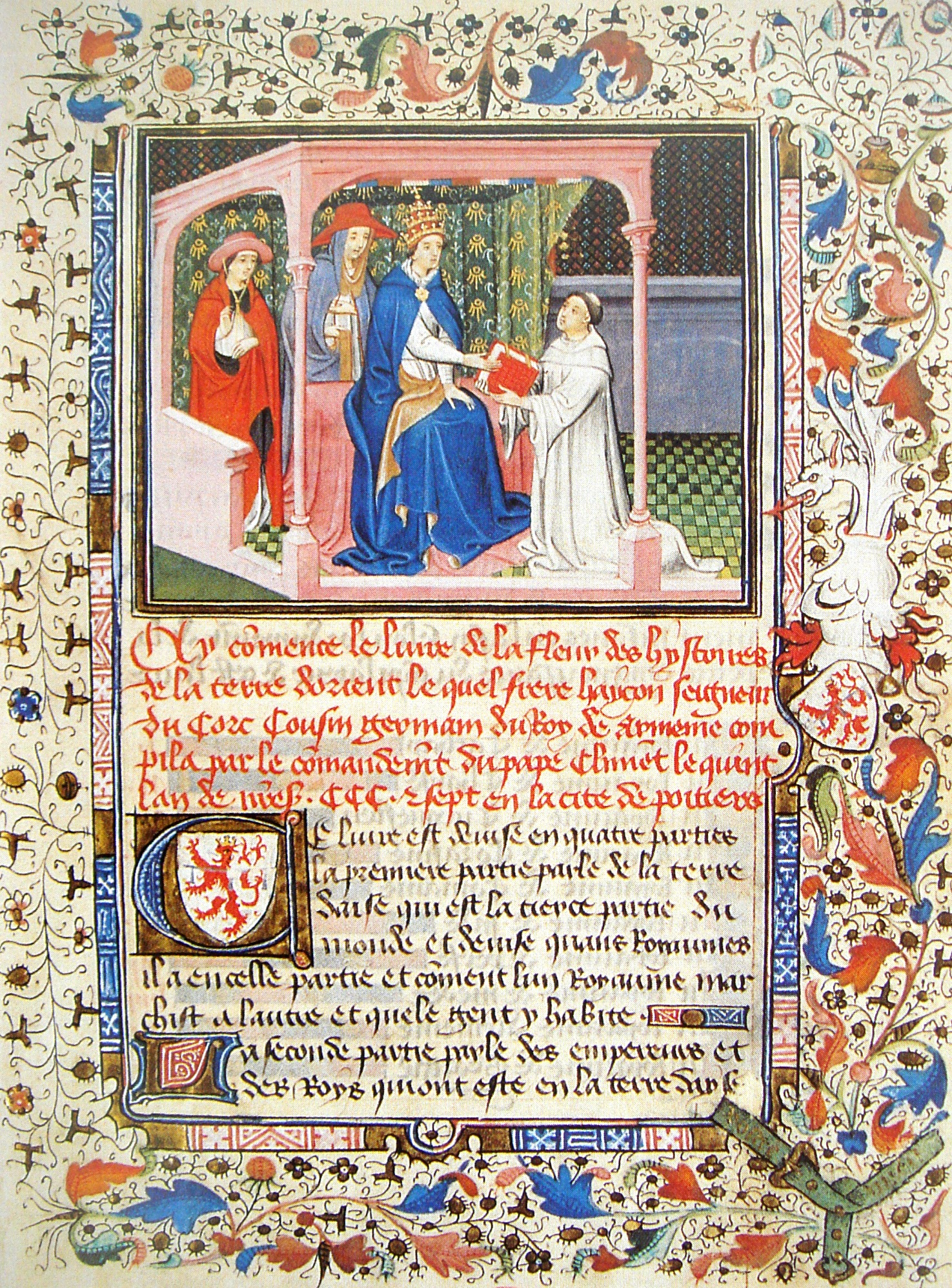
Hayton of Corycus remits his report on the Mongols to Pope Clement V in 1307.

The spread of Islam and the Muslim conquests in the 7th century established a sharp opposition or even a sense of polarity in the Middle Ages between European Christendom and the Islamic world, which stretched from the Middle East and Central Asia to North Africa and Andalusia. Popular medieval European knowledge of cultures farther east was poor and depended on the widely-fictionalized travels of Sir John Mandeville and the legends of Prester John, but the equally-famous account by Marco Polo was much longer and was more accurate.

Scholarly work was initially largely linguistic in nature, with primarily a religious focus on understanding both Biblical Hebrew and languages like Syriac with early Christian literature, but there was also a wish to understand Arabic works on medicine, philosophy, and science. That effort, also called the Studia Linguarum, existed sporadically throughout the Middle Ages, and the Renaissance of the 12th century witnessed a particular growth in translations of Arabic and Greek texts into Latin, with figures like Constantine the African, who translated 37 books, mostly medical texts, from Arabic to Latin, and Herman of Carinthia, one of the translators of the Qur'an. The earliest translation of the Qur'an into Latin was completed in 1143, but little use was made of it until it was printed in 1543. It was later translated into other European languages. Gerard of Cremona and others based themselves in Andalusia to take advantage of its Arabic libraries and scholars. However, as the Christian Reconquista in the Iberian Peninsula began to accelerate in the 11th century, such contacts became rarer in Spain. Chairs of Hebrew, Arabic, and Aramaic were briefly established at Oxford and in four other universities after the Council of Vienne (1312).

There was a vague but increasing knowledge of the complex civilisations of China and of India from which luxury goods (notably cotton and silk textiles as well as ceramics) were imported. Although the Crusades produced relatively little in the way of scholarly interchange, the eruption of the Mongol Empire had strategic implications for the Crusader kingdoms and for Europe itself, which led to extended diplomatic contacts. During the Age of Exploration, European interest in mapping Asia, especially the sea routes, became intense, but most was pursued outside the universities.

=== Renaissance to 1800 ===
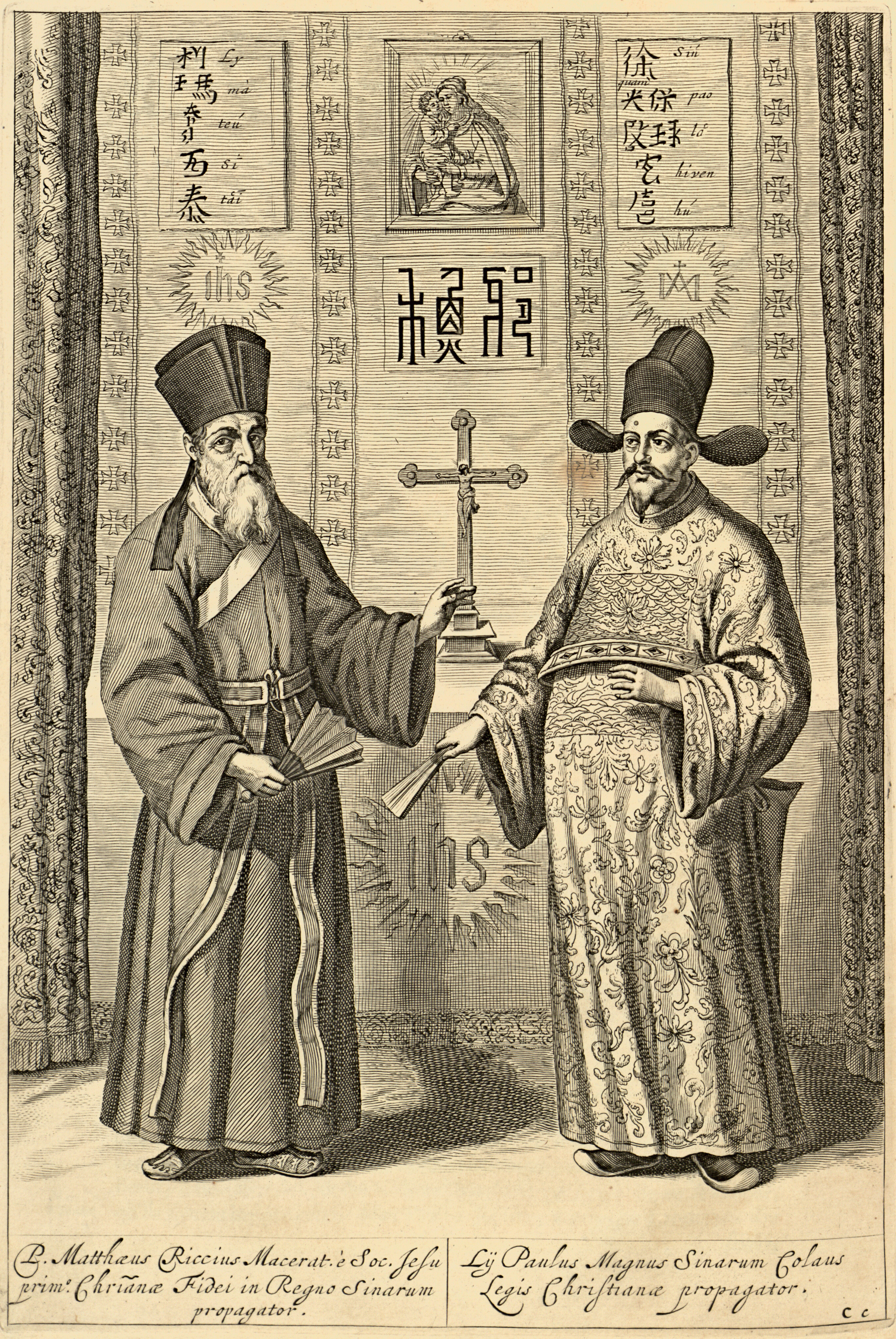
Matteo Ricci (left) and Xu Guangqi (徐光啟) (right) in the Chinese edition of Euclid's Elements (幾何原本) published in 1607

University Oriental studies became systematic during the Renaissance, with the linguistic and religious aspects initially continuing to dominate. There was also a political dimension, as translations for diplomatic purposes were needed even before the West engaged actively with the East beyond the Ottoman Empire. A landmark was the publication in Spain in 1514 of the first Polyglot Bible, containing the complete existing texts in Hebrew and Aramaic, in addition to Greek and Latin. At Cambridge University, there has been a Regius Professor of Hebrew since 1540 (the fifth-oldest regular chair there), and the university's chair in Arabic was founded in about 1643. Oxford followed for Hebrew in 1546 (both chairs were established by Henry VIII). One distinguished scholar was Edmund Castell, who published his Lexicon Heptaglotton Hebraicum, Chaldaicum, Syriacum, Samaritanum, Aethiopicum, Arabicum, et Persicum in 1669, and scholars like Edward Pococke had traveled to the East and wrote on the modern history and society of the Eastern peoples. The University of Salamanca had Professors of Oriental Languages at least in the 1570s. In France, Jean-Baptiste Colbert initiated a training programme for Les jeunes de langues (The Youth of Languages), young linguists in the diplomatic service, like François Pétis de la Croix, who, like his father and his son, served as an Arabic interpreter to the King. The study of the Far East was pioneered by missionaries, especially Matteo Ricci and others during the Jesuit China missions, and missionary motives were to remain important, at least in linguistic studies.

During the 18th century, Western scholars reached a reasonable basic level of understanding of the geography and most of the history of the region, but knowledge of the areas least accessible to Western travelers, like Japan and Tibet, and their languages remained limited. The Enlightenment thinkers characterized aspects of the pagan East as superior to the Christian West in Montesquieu's Lettres Persanes and Voltaire's ironic promotion of Zoroastrianism. Others, like Edward Gibbon, praised the relative religious tolerance of the Middle East over what they considered the intolerant Christian West. Many, including Diderot and Voltaire, praised the high social status of scholarship in Mandarin China.

The Università degli Studi di Napoli "L'Orientale" (English: University of Naples "L'Orientale"), founded in Naples in 1732, is the oldest school of Sinology and Oriental Studies of Continental Europe.

The late 18th century saw the start of a great increase in the study of the archaeology of the period, which was to be an ever-more important aspect of the field in the next century. Egyptology led the way and, as with many other ancient cultures, provide linguists with new material for decipherment and study.

=== 19th century ===
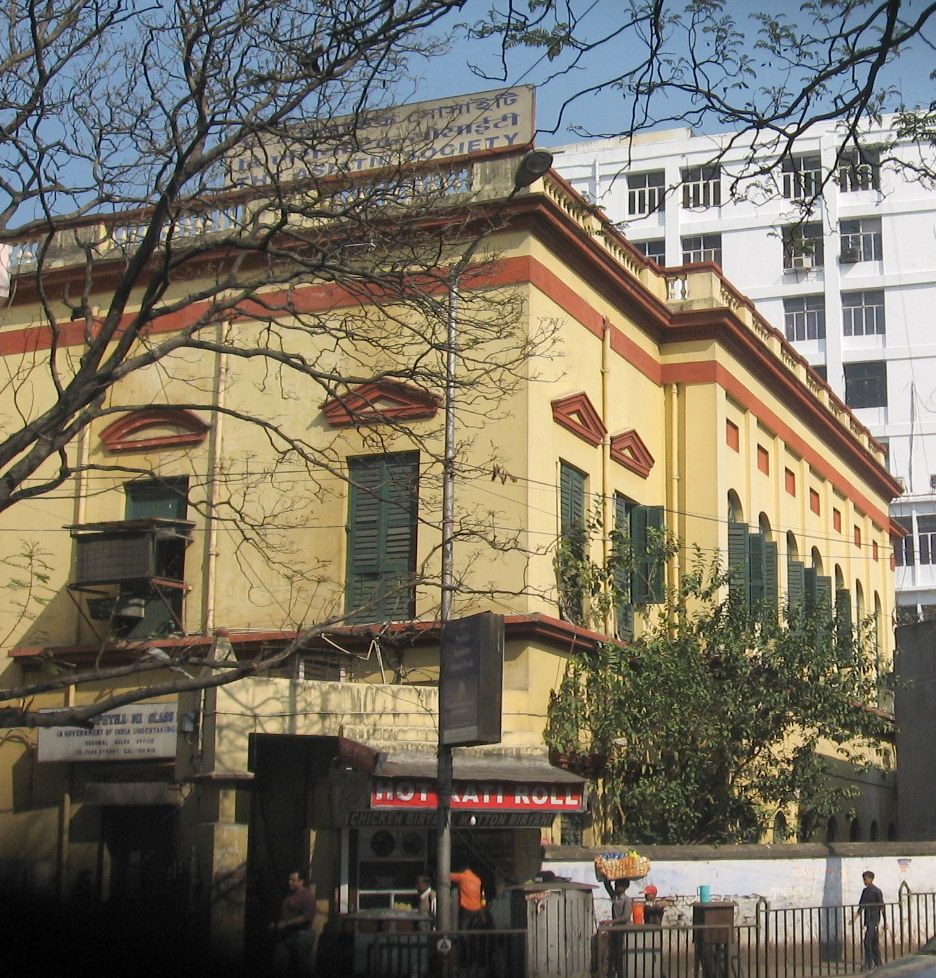
The old building of the Asiatic Society, in Calcutta, founded by William Jones in 1784

With a great increase in knowledge of Asia among Western specialists, the increasing political and economic involvement in the region, and particularly the realization of the existence of close relations between Indian and European languages by William Jones, there emerged more complex intellectual connections between the early history of Eastern and Western cultures. Some of the developments occurred in the context of Franco–British rivalry for the control of India. Liberal economists, such as James Mill, denigrated Eastern civilizations as static and corrupt. Karl Marx, himself of Jewish origin, characterized the Asiatic mode of production as unchanging because of the economic narrowness of village economies and the state's role in production. Oriental despotism was generally regarded in Europe as a major factor in the relative failure of progress of Eastern societies. The study of Islam was particularly central to the field since most people living in the geographical area that was termed as the Orient were Muslims. The interest in understanding Islam was fueled partly by economic considerations of the growing trade in the Mediterranean region and by the changing cultural and intellectual climate of the time.

During the course of the century, Western archeology spread across the Middle East and Asia, with spectacular results. In the 1850s, for example, the French government was determined to mount large-scale operations in Assyria and Mesopotamia to showcase its dominance in the region. An archaeological team, led by Victor Place, excavated the palace of the Assyrian King Sargon II in Khorsabad (formerly Nineveh), which was the first systematic excavation of the site. The expedition resulted in a pioneering publication, Ninevah and Assyria, which jointly authored by Victor Place and Felix Thomas and was published around 1867. New national museums provided a setting for important archaeological finds, most of which were then bought back to Europe, and they put Orientalists in the public spotlight as never before.

The first serious European studies of Buddhism and Hinduism were by the scholars Eugene Burnouf and Max Müller. The academic study of Islam also developed, and by the mid-19th century, Oriental studies had become a well-established academic discipline in most European countries, especially those with imperial interests in the region. Although scholastic study expanded, so did racist attitudes and stereotypes of Asian peoples and cultures, however, which frequently extended to local Jewish and Romani communities since they were also of Oriental origin and widely recognized as such. Scholarship often was intertwined with prejudicial racist and religious presumptions to which the new biological sciences tended to contribute until the end of the Second World War.

=== 20th century ===
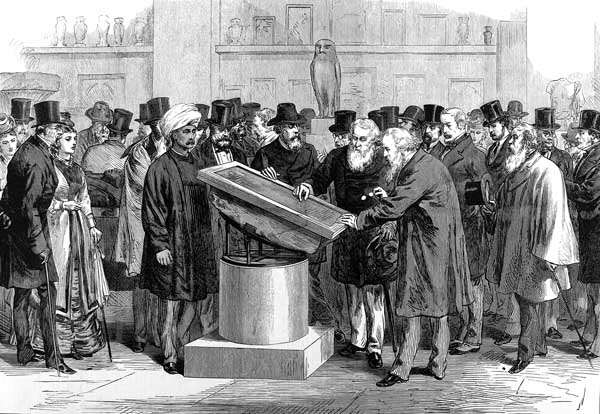
Experts inspecting the Rosetta Stone during the Second International Congress of Orientalists in London, 1874

The participation in academic studies by scholars from the newly-independent nations of the region itself inevitably changed the nature of studies considerably, with the emergence of post-colonial studies and Subaltern Studies. The influence of Orientalism in the sense used by Edward Said in his book of the same name in scholarship on the Middle East was seen to have re-emerged and risen in prevalence again after the end of the Cold War. It is contended that was partly a response to "a lacuna" in identity politics in international relations generally and within the 'West' particularly, which was brought about by the absence of Soviet communism as a global adversary. The end of the Cold War caused an era that has been marked by discussions of Islamist terrorism framing views on the extent to which the culture of the Arab world and of Islam is a threat to that of the West. The essence of the debate reflects a presupposition for which Orientalism has been criticized by the Orient being defined exclusively by Islam. Such considerations were seen to have occurred in the wider context of the way in which many Western scholars responded to international politics after the Cold War, and they were arguably heightened by the terrorist attacks of September 11, 2001.

Symbolic of that type of response to the end of the Cold War was the popularization of the clash of civilizations thesis. That particular idea of a fundamental conflict between East and West was first advanced by Bernard Lewis in his article "The Roots of Muslim Rage", which was written in 1990. Again, that was seen as a way of accounting for new forms and lines of division in international society after the Cold War. The clash of civilizations approach involved another characteristic of Orientalist thought: the tendency to see the region as being one homogenous civilization, rather than as comprising various different and diverse cultures and strands. It was an idea that was taken on more famously by Samuel P. Huntington in his 1993 article in Foreign Affairs, "The Clash of Civilizations?"

== Orientalism ==
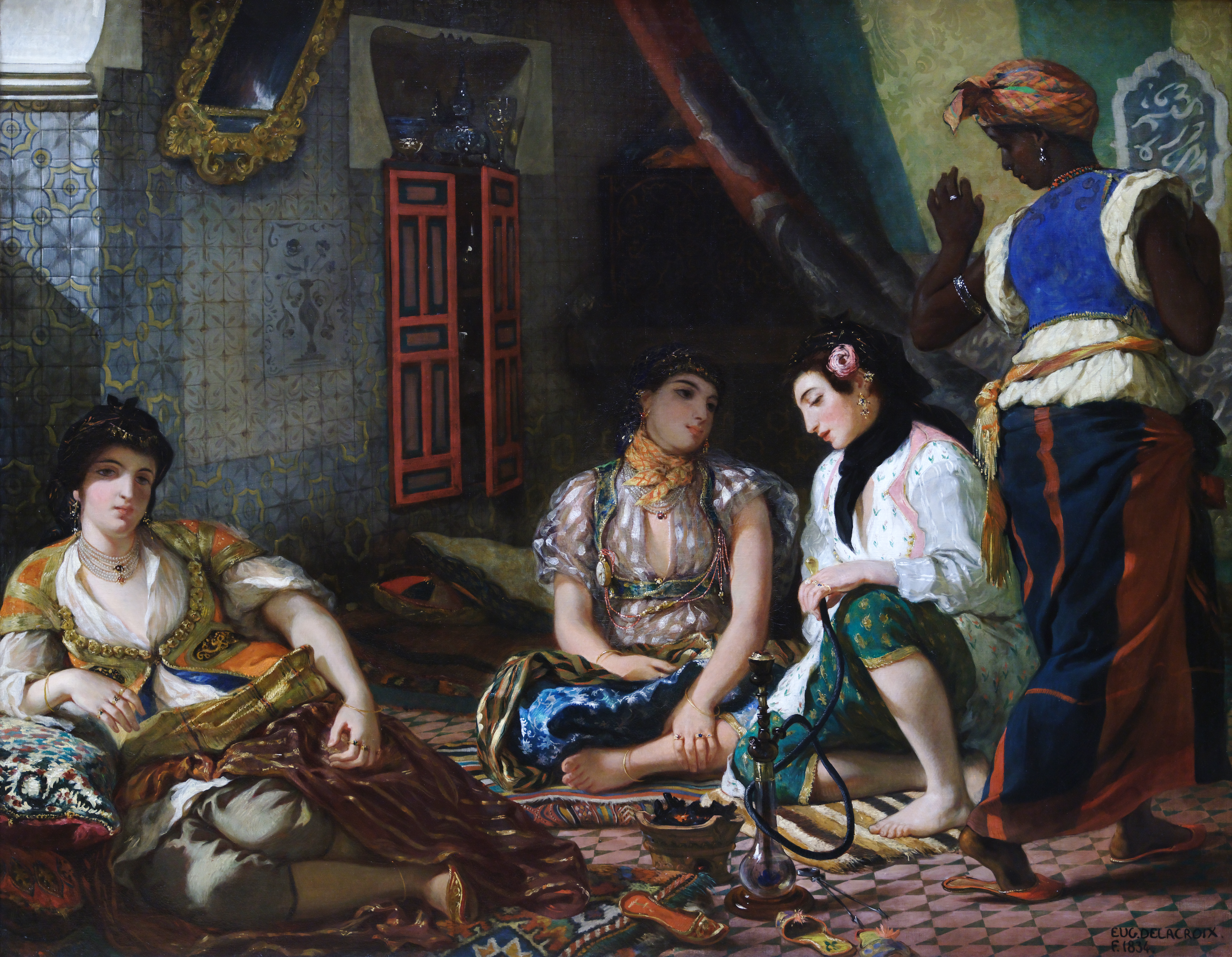
The Women of Algiers (1834) by Eugène Delacroix

The term Orientalism has come to acquire negative connotations in some quarters and is interpreted to refer to the study of the East by Westerners who are shaped by the attitudes of the era of European imperialism in the 18th and the 19th centuries. When used in that sense, the term often implies prejudiced outsider-caricatured interpretations of Eastern cultures and peoples. That viewpoint was most famously articulated and propagated by Edward Said in his Orientalism (1978), a critical history of that scholarly tradition. In contrast, the term has also been used by some modern scholars to refer to writers of the colonial era who had pro-Eastern attitudes, as opposed to those who saw nothing of value in non-Western cultures.

== From "Oriental studies" to "Asian studies" ==
Like the term Orient, Orientalism is a term that derives from the Latin word oriens (rising) and, equally likely, from the Greek word ('he'oros', the direction of the rising sun). "Orient" is the opposite of Occident, a term for the Western world. In terms of the Old World, Europe was considered the Occident (the West) and its farthest-known extreme as the Orient (the East). From the Roman Empire to the Middle Ages, what is now in the West considered the Middle East was then considered the Orient. However, the use of the various terms and senses derived from "Orient" has greatly declined since the 20th century, especially since trans-Pacific links between Asia and America have grown, and travel from Asia usually arrive in the United States from the west.

In most North American and Australian universities, the field of Oriental studies has now been replaced by that of Asian studies. In many cases, the field has been localised to specific regions, such as Middle Eastern or Near Eastern studies, South Asian studies, and East Asian Studies. That reflects the fact that the Orient is not a single monolithic region but rather a broad area, encompassing multiple civilizations. The generic concept of Oriental studies has to its opponents lost any use that it may have once had and is perceived as obstructing changes in departmental structures to reflect actual patterns of modern scholarship. In many universities, like the University of Chicago, the faculties and institutions have been divided. The Biblical languages may be linked with theological institutes, and the study of ancient civilizations in the region may come under a different faculty from that of the studies of modern periods.

In 1970, the Faculty of Oriental Studies at the Australian National University was renamed the Faculty of Asian Studies. In 2007, the Faculty of Oriental Studies at Cambridge University was renamed the Faculty of Asian and Middle Eastern Studies, and the University of Oxford followed suit in 2022, also renaming the former Faculty of Oriental Studies as the Faculty of Asian and Middle Eastern Studies. In April 2023, Chicago's Oriental Institute was renamed the Institute for the Study of Ancient Cultures, West Asia & North Africa, abbreviated as ISAC.

Elsewhere, names have remained the same, such as the School of Oriental and African Studies in London (though now referred to only by the acronym "SOAS") and the Pontifical Oriental Institute in Rome, among others.

Various explanations for the change to "Asian studies" are offered; a growing number of professional scholars and students of Asian Studies are themselves Asian or from groups of Asian origin (like Asian Americans). This change of labeling may be correlated in some cases to the fact that sensitivity to the term "Oriental" has been heightened in a more politically correct atmosphere, although it began earlier: Bernard Lewis' own department at Princeton University was renamed a decade before Said wrote his book, a detail that Said gets wrong. By some, the term "Oriental" has come to be thought offensive to non-Westerners. Area studies that incorporate not only philological pursuits but identity politics may also account for the hesitation to use the term "Oriental".

== See also ==
- Arabist
- Biblical studies
- Buddhist studies
- Hebraism
- Hebraist
- Hindu studies
- History of Christianity (mentions the beginnings and spread of Christianity in the Middle East and Asia)
- Indology
- Iranistics
- Japonism
- Jewish studies
- List of Islamic studies scholars
- Mongolian studies
- Orientalism in early modern France
- Philology
- Silk Road

=== Institutions ===
==== Americas ====
- American Oriental Society
- Oriental Club of Philadelphia
- Smithsonian Institution, Freer Gallery of Art

==== Asia ====
- Tōyō Bunko in Tokyo
- Khuda Bakhsh Oriental Public Library in India

==== Europe ====
- Institute of Oriental Studies of the Russian Academy of Sciences
- Institute of Oriental Manuscripts of the Russian Academy of Sciences
- International Institute for Asian Studies, Leiden University
