= Melay, Saône-et-Loire =

Melay
- Commune
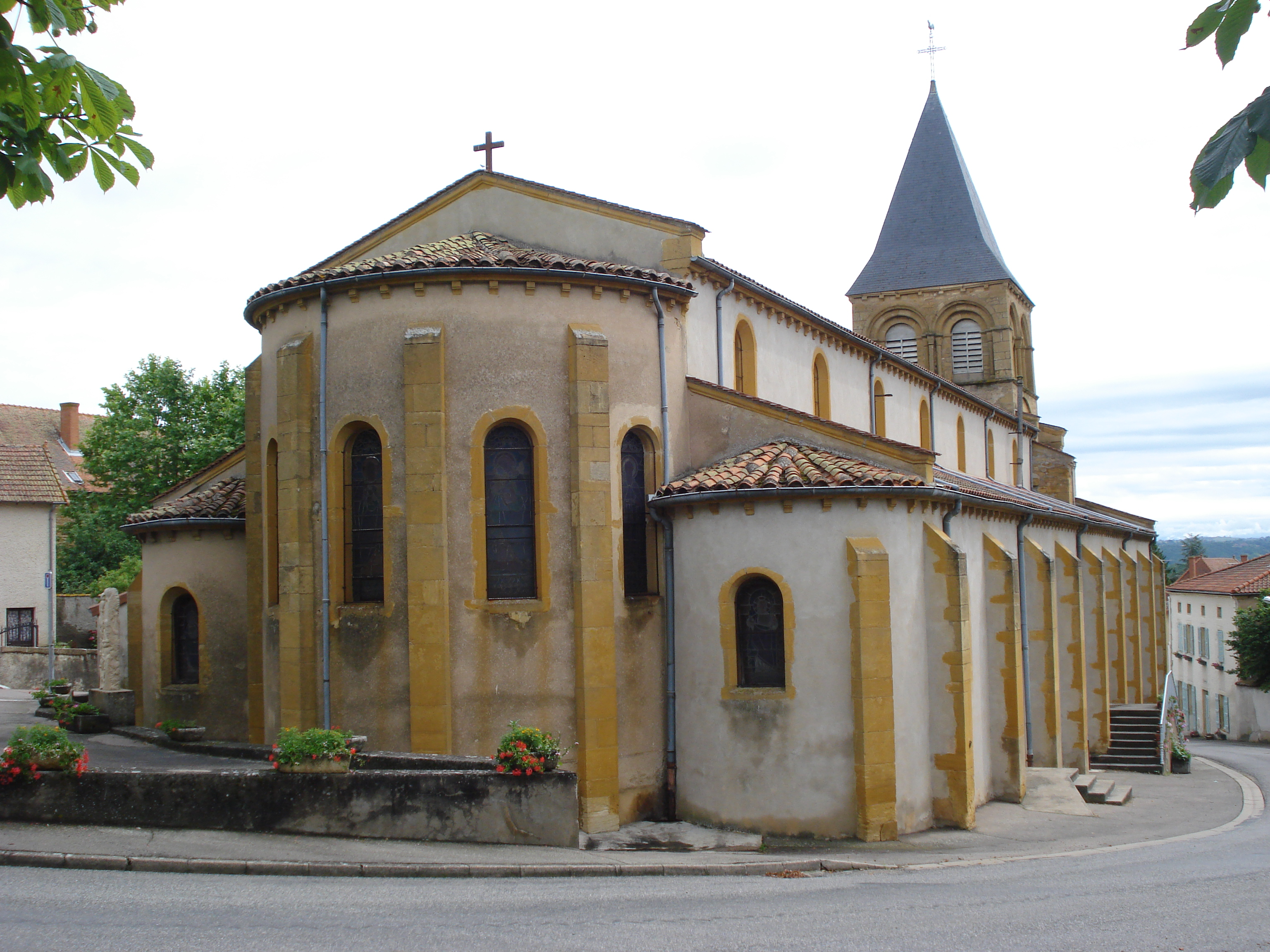
- The church in Melay
- Location of Melay
- Location within France Location within Bourgogne-Franche-Comté
- Coordinates: 46°12′52″N 4°01′04″E
- Country: France
- Region: Bourgogne-Franche-Comté
- Department: Saône-et-Loire
- Arrondissement: Charolles
- Canton: Paray-le-Monial
- Area^{1}: 36.5 km^{2} (14.1 sq mi)
- Elevation: 295 m (968 ft)
- Highest elevation: 353 m (1,158 ft)
- Lowest elevation: 245 m (804 ft)
- Population (2023): 967
  - Density: 26.5/km^{2} (68.6/sq mi)
- Time zone: UTC+01:00 (CET)
  - Summer (DST): UTC+02:00 (CEST)
- INSEE/Postal code: 71291 /71340
- ^{1} French Land Register data, which excludes lakes, ponds, glaciers > 1 km^{2} (0.386 sq mi or 247 acres) and river estuaries.

Melay (French pronunciation: [məlɛ]) is a commune in the Saône-et-Loire department in the region of Bourgogne-Franche-Comté in eastern France. The French orientalist François Savary de Brèves was born in Melay.

== See also ==
- Communes of the Saône-et-Loire department
