= Edmund Castell =

English orientalist

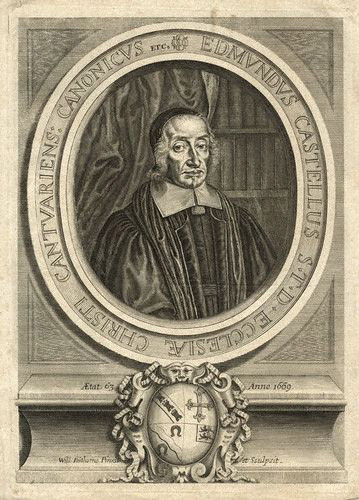
- Edmund Castell
- Born: 1606
- Died: 1685 (aged 78–79)

Edmund Castell (1606–1686) was an English orientalist.

He was born at Tadlow, in Cambridgeshire. At the age of fifteen he entered Emmanuel College, Cambridge, gaining his BA in 1624-5 and his MA in 1628. Appointed Professor of Arabic in 1666, with the full title 'Sir Thomas Adams Professor of Arabic'. He moved to St John's in 1671, because of the valuable library there. His great work, the Lexicon Heptaglotton Hebraicum, Chaldaicum, Syriacum, Samaritanum, Aethiopicum, Arabicum, et Persicum (1669) (a single multilingual dictionary lexicon of Latin, Hebrew, Aramaic, Syriac, Samaratin, Ethiopian, Arabic, and Persian) took him eighteen years to complete, working (according to his own account) from sixteen to eighteen hours a day. He employed fourteen assistants on the project, and spent £12,000, ruining himself in the process as there was little demand for his finished lexicon.

By 1667, he found himself in prison because he was unable to discharge his brother's debts, for which he had made himself liable. However, a volume of poems dedicated to the king brought him preferment. He was made prebendary of Canterbury Cathedral and professor of Arabic at Cambridge. Before undertaking the Lexicon Heptaglotton, Castell had helped Dr Brian Walton in the preparation of his Polyglott Bible. He died at Higham Gobion, Bedfordshire, where he was rector, and is buried there. He bequeathed his manuscripts to the University of Cambridge.

The Syriac section of the Lexicon was issued separately at Göttingen in 1788 by J.D. Michaelis, who made a tribute to Castell's learning and industry. Johann Friedrich Ludolf Trier published the Hebrew section in 1790–1792.
