= Chronicon orientale =

Anonymous universal history in Arabic, authored 1257–1260

The Chronicon orientale (or al-Taʾrīkh al-Sharqī, both meaning "eastern chronicle") is an anonymous universal history written in Arabic by an Egyptian Christian between 1257 and 1260. It was mistakenly attributed to Abū Shākir ibn Buṭrus al-Rāhib in the 17th century, an attribution that has been frequently repeated. Maged Mikhail refers to its author as Pseudo-Abū Shākir, and Adel Sidarus notes that he has often been referred to as Buṭrus (Petrus) ibn al-Rāhib, erroneously combining Abū Shākir's name with that of his father.

The work is essentially an abstract or epitome of the chronographical chapters (47–50) of Abū Shākir's much longer Kitāb al-tawārīkh, published in 1257. It was written before Abū Shākir's ordination as a deacon in or about 1260. The Chronicon has often been dismissed as a pale imitation of the Kitāb, but it does have some independent value. Its chronological ordering is generally trustworthy, but its absolute dates are not.

The chronology of the Chronicon is provided by the Old Testament down to the time of Jesus, then by the Roman emperors down to Muḥammad and finally by the rulers of Islamic Egypt and Syria down to his own day. It also includes a chronological history of the Caliphate and the Coptic patriarchate from Mark (AD 43–68) to Athanasius III (1250–1261). The information on the patriarchs is more substantial than that found in Jirjīs al-Makīn, with an emphasis on martyrdom. Besides Abū Shākir's Kitāb, the author of the Chronicon made independent use of the History of the Patriarchs of Alexandria.

The Catholic scholar Abraham Ecchellensis published a Latin translation of the text in 1651, bringing Coptic historiography to western readership for the first time. He did not know the identity of the author of the Chronicon. He added his own Historia orientalis supplementum as an appendix. In the same year, the Protestant theologian Johann Heinrich Hottinger published his own Historia orientalis. In 1729 Giuseppe Simone Assemani reprinted Ecchellensis's with some emendations based on the latter's notes and on a manuscript in the Vatican Library. He attributed it to Abū Shākir and included biographical notes about him.

== Editions ==
- Chronicon orientale, trans. Abraham Ecchellensis, Paris, 1651 (repr. Paris, 1685).
- Chronicon orientale Petri Rahebi Aegyptii ed. Giuseppe Simone Assemani, Venice, 1729.
- Petrus ibn Rahib: Chronicon orientale, ed. Louis Cheikho, Beirut, 1903 (repr. Leuven, 1955, 1960, 1963).

== Bibliography ==
- Frederick, Vincent (1991). "Chronicon orientale". In Aziz Suryal Atiya (ed.). The Coptic Encyclopedia. Vol. 2. New York: Macmillan Publishers. cols. 548a–548b.
- Hamilton, Alastair (2006). The Copts and the West, 1439–1822: The European Discovery of the Egyptian Church. Oxford University Press.
- Loop, Jan (2013). Johann Heinrich Hottinger: Arabic and Islamic Studies in the Seventeenth Century. Oxford University Press.
- Mikhail, Maged (2017). The Legacy of Demetrius of Alexandria 189–232 CE: The Form and Function of Hagiography in Late Antique and Islamic Egypt. Routledge.
- Sidarus, Adel Y. (2004). "Ibn al-Rāhib". In Bearman, P. J.; Bianquis, Th.; Bosworth, C. E.; van Donzel, E. & Heinrichs, W. P. (eds.). The Encyclopaedia of Islam, Second Edition. Volume XII: Supplement. Leiden: E. J. Brill. p. 396. ISBN 978-90-04-13974-9.
- Sidarus, Adel Y. (2012). "Ibn al-Rāhib". In David Thomas; Alex Mallett (eds.). Christian–Muslim Relations: A Bibliographical History. Vol. 4 (1200–1350). Brill. pp. 471–479.
- Sidarus, Adel Y. (2014). "Copto-Arabic Universal Chronography Between Antiquity, Judaism, Christianity and Islam: The K. al-Tawārīkh of N. al-Khilāfa Abū Shākir Ibn al-Rāhib (655 Heg. / 973 Mart. / 1257 Chr. / 1569 Alex. / 6750 AM)" (PDF). Collectanea Christiana Orientalia. 11: 221–250.
