= Studia Linguarum =

13th-century Catholic language schools

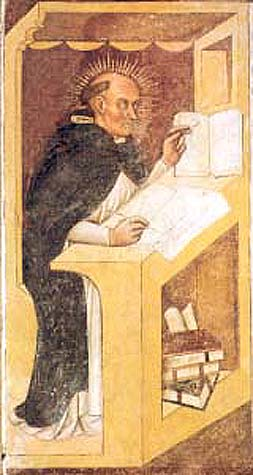
Raymond of Peñafort founded one of the first schools of the Studia Linguarum.

The Studia Linguarum (literally "Language Institutes") were the first attempt to study oriental languages by the Roman Catholic Church. The need to study oriental languages was affirmed by the General Chapter of the Dominican Order in Paris in 1236. The objective of the schools was to help the Dominicans liberate Christian captives in Islamic lands.

== Description ==
The first school of the Studia Linguarum was established in Tunis by Raymond of Peñafort in the early 13th century, where it was also designated as the Studium arabicum.It is known that in 1250, the Provincial chapter of Toledo sent 8 friars to the Tunis institute to study Arabic, including the famous Arabist Ramon Marti. The school permitted some students to learn Arabic during the second half of the 13th century.

As a side effect of the establishment of these institutes, some Arabic scientific works were also translated in European languages, such as the ophthalmological work Liber Oculorum of Ali Ibn Isa (Jesu Haly) by Friar Dominicus Marrochini of the Studium of Murcia.

In 1311, the Council of Vienne further decided to create schools for the study of oriental languages in the universities of Paris, Bologna, Oxford, Salamanca and Rome.

== See also ==
- Pontifical Council for Interreligious Dialogue
- Pope Gregory IX
- Orientalism in early modern France
