= Guy Michel Lejay =

Gui-Michel Lejay (Paris, 1588 - Vezelay, 1674) was an advocate at the French Parliament, best known for his Polyglot Bible, the Paris Polyglot 1645. The Lejay Bible was known for the beauty of its fonts for which new metal type was cast in Aramaic, Samaritan, and Arabic. Obstacles to Lejay's project at Rome were smoothed by his protector and sponsor Cardinal Pierre de Bérulle.

The Paris Polyglot (1645) contained the first printed texts of the Syriac Old Testament edited by Gabriel Sionita, a Maronite (with the exception of the Book of Ruth by Abraham Ecchellensis, also a Maronite) and of the Samaritan Pentateuch in a version by Jean Morin (Morinus). It contains also a compilation made from several Arabic versions.
