= Victor Scialac =

Victor Scialac (Syriac: Naṣrallāh Shalaq al-'Āqūrī) was a Maronite priest who collaborated with French Orientalist François Savary de Brèves in the 17th century.

Victor Scialac was a former students of the Maronite College in Rome, and together with Gabriel Sionita (Jibrā'īl aṣ-Ṣahyūnī) was recruited by François Savary de Brèves for editorial and translation work. Victor Scialac participated in Rome to the work of Brèves' publishing house, the Typographia Savariana, through which were printed a Latin-Arab bilingual edition of a catechism of Cardinal Bellarmino in 1613, as well as in 1614 a Syriac-Latin bilingual edition of the Book of Psalms.

Victor Scialac then accompanied Brèves to Paris, with an additional Maronite priest Johannes Hesronita (Yūḥannā al-Ḥaṣrūnī), to publish the first part of a Grammatica Arabica Maronitarum.

Brèves also attempted to establish an Oriental college in Paris, but failed for lack of funds. He succeeded however in obtaining Royal pensions for Sionita and Scialac, as interpreters and professors of Arabic and Syriac at the Collège Royal.

== See also ==
- List of Maronites
