= Abraham Ecchellensis =

Maronite Catholic philosopher and linguist

Ibrahim al-Haqilani (February 18, 1605 – July 15, 1664; Latinized as Abraham Ecchellensis) was a Maronite Catholic philosopher and linguist involved in the translation of the Bible into Arabic. He translated several Arabic works into Latin, the most important of which was the Chronicon orientale attributed to Ibn al-Rahib.

== Biography ==
Born in Haqil, Lebanon, his last name derived from his place of birth. Ibrahim was educated at the Maronite College in Rome. After taking his doctorate in theology and philosophy, he returned for a time to his native land.

Ibrahim was ordained as a deacon and later taught Arabic and Syriac, first in Pisa and then in Rome in the College of the Propaganda. In 1628, he published a Syriac grammar. Called to Paris in 1640 to assist Guy Michel Lejay in the preparation of his polyglot Bible, Ibrahim contributed to that work the Arabic and Latin versions of the Book of Ruth and the Arabic version of 3 Maccabees.

In 1646, Ibrahim was appointed professor of Syriac and Arabic at the Collège de France. Being invited by the Congregation of the Propaganda to take part in the preparation of an Arabic version of the Bible, Ibrahim went again in 1652 or 1653 to Rome. He published several Latin translations of Arabic works, of which the most important was the Chronicon Orientale of Ibnar-Rahib (1653), a history of the patriarchs of Alexandria.

Ibrahim engaged in an interesting controversy with John Selden about the historical grounds of episcopal polity, spurring him to publish his Eutychius vindicatus, sive Responsio ad Seldeni Origines (1661). With Giovanni Alfonso Borelli he wrote a Latin translation of the 5th, 6th and 7th books of the Conics by the geometrician Apollonius of Perga (1661). Ibrahim was also the first person to identify the Mandaeans of Iraq and Iran as descended from the Gnostic movements going back to the 1st century.
