= Gabriel Sionita =

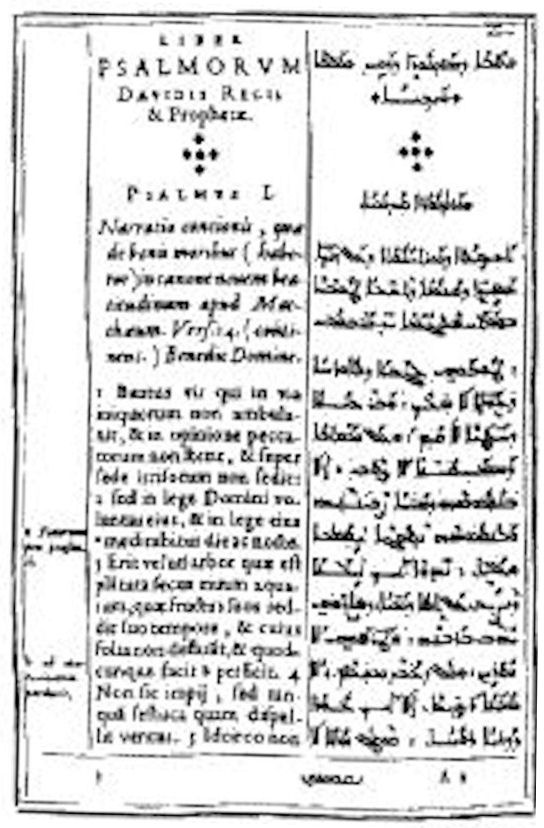
Latin-Syriac psalter by Gabriel Sionita, 1625

Gabriel Sionita (Syriac: Jibrā'īl aṣ-Ṣahyūnī; 1577 at Ehden in Lebanon – 1648 in Paris) was a learned Maronite priest, famous for his role in the publication of the 1645 Paris Polyglot of the Bible.

== Life ==
Gabriel Sionita was born Jibrayil al-Sahyuni Al Karami in Mount Lebanon, in the Maronite village of Ehden, to an old family of village notables and clerics, known today as the Karam family. Maronite Patriarch al-Rizzi or Sergius Risius (1581-1597) sent Sionita and nine other Maronite children to Rome at the age of seven to study in the new Maronite College. In Rome, he learnt Latin and Arabic on top of his native Syriac, and acquired a slight knowledge of Hebrew. He studied theology, but only went into the priesthood later, in Paris, aged 45.

Savary de Breves was French ambassador to Turkey and was interested in Oriental studies. When recalled from Rome, he took two Maronites with him to Paris, to assist in the publication of the polyglot under the auspices of de Thou, the royal librarian, and Cardinal Duperron. The two Maronites were Gabriel Sionita and John Hesronita, Gabriel being the more prominent of the two. They received an annual stipend of 600 livres, and Gabriel was appointed to the chair of Semitic languages at Sorbonne.

Both de Thou and Duperron died within four years, and serious financial difficulties arose. In 1619, the assembly of French clergy at Blois granted 8,000 livres to support the undertaking; but through some malversation of funds, this money was never actually paid; at least, such is the accusation brought by Gabriel in his preface to the Syriac Psalter, which he published. The Maronites seem to have become involved in pecuniary embarrassments, which led to feuds with the leaders of the undertaking. In 1619, however, by royal diploma, Gabriel's stipend had been raised to 1,200 livres. The following year he received the a doctorate, and two years later, the priesthood.

In 1626, as Gabriel held no classes owing to the lack of students, his stipend was curtailed. After some time, however, he was paid on the original offer; and in 1629, his salary was increased to 2,000 livres. In 1630, he recommenced work on the polyglot. He did not apply himself fully to the work, and was even accused of carelessness in the work. He again found himself in difficulties.

In the quarrel which ensued, Richelieu supported the editor, Guy Michel Lejay, against the Maronites. As it was feared that Gabriel might leave the country, the cardinal had him imprisoned in Vincennes (1640). He was released after three months, when he had signed an undertaking and given sureties that he would prepare the texts for the polyglot. He completed his great task some time before his death, at the age of 71.

== Works ==
Gabriel's work in the polyglot included revising and correcting almost all of the Syriac and Arabic texts. He translated the Arabic and Syriac texts into Latin, with the exceptions of the Book of Ruth. But he only made a revision and not a fresh translation of the Gospels into Latin, nor did he translate from Syriac into Latin the Sapiential Books or the Apocalypse. Together with John Hesronita and Victor Sciala, he published a Latin translation of the (Arabic) Psalter in 1614. In 1616, he published a document on Arabic grammar, of which one division (Liber I) appeared, containing the rules for reading.

In 1619, his Geographia Nubiensis (meaning a translation of the Maronite editions of the same) of Edrisi's geography, with a small treatise as an appendix, "De nonnullis Orient. urb. nec non indig. relig. ac. moribus". In 1634, he was issued a Poema enigmaticum in praise of Divine wisdom by an ancient Syrian philosopher.

1630 saw the publication of his Testamentum et pactiones inter Mohammedem et Christianae fidei cultores, an edition of the medieval Arabic document, the Achtiname of Muhammad, with Latin translation.

Finally, three small pamphlets appeared between 1640 and 1642, one in Latin and two in French, containing his defence in the actions of Le Jay and Vitre.
