= Polyglot (book) =

Multilingual book or manuscript

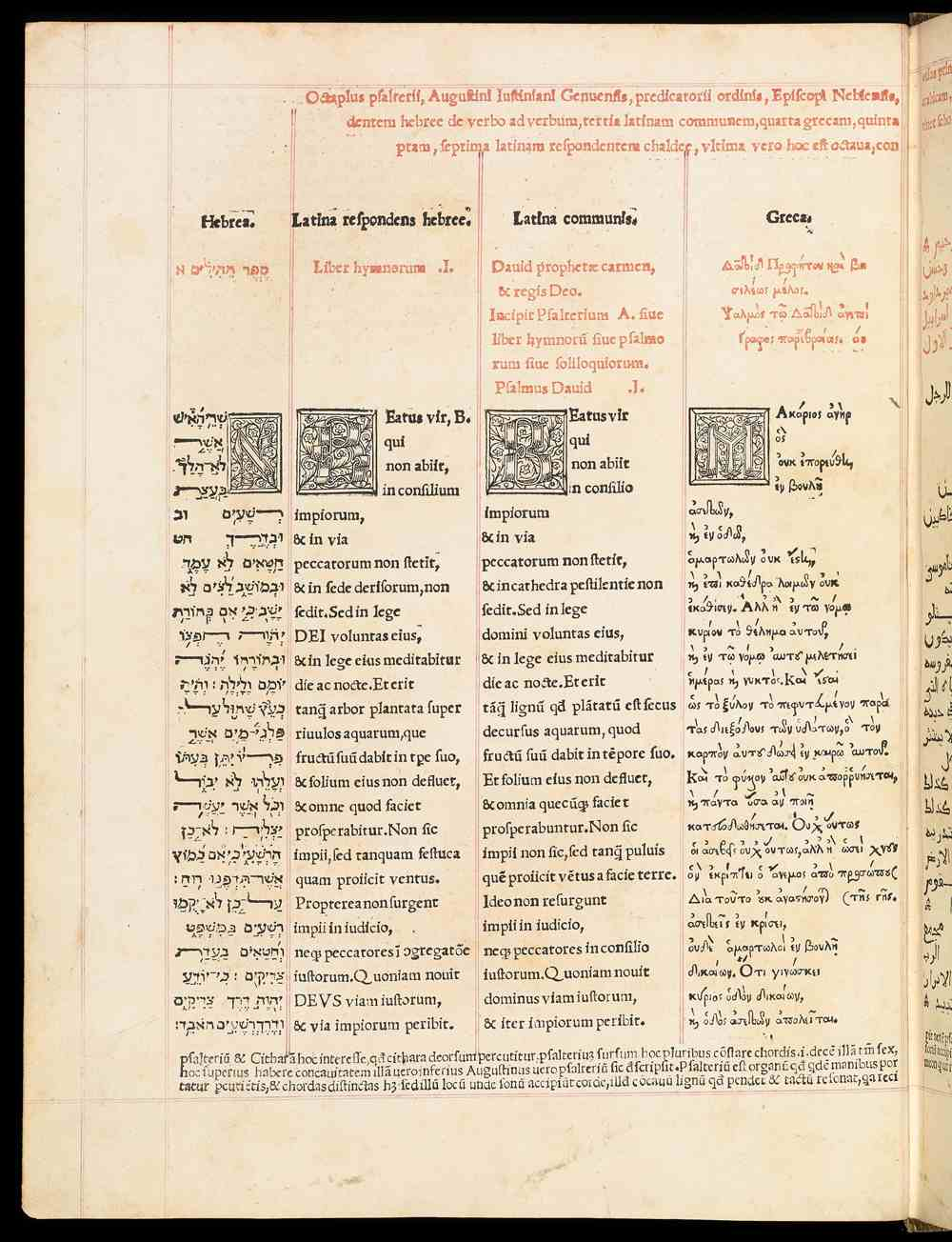
Genoa psalter of 1516, edited by Agostino Giustiniani, Bishop of Nebbio

A polyglot is a book that contains side-by-side versions of the same text in several different languages.

Some editions of the Christian Bible or its parts are polyglots, in which the Hebrew and Greek originals are exhibited along with historical translations. Polyglots are useful for studying the history of the text and its interpretation.

== Origen's Hexapla ==
The first enterprise of this kind is the famous Hexapla of Origen of Alexandria (c. 250).

In this document, the Old Testament Scriptures were written in six parallel columns, the first containing the Hebrew text, the second a transliteration of this in Greek letters, the third and fourth the Greek translations by Aquila of Sinope and by Symmachus the Ebionite, the fifth the Septuagint version as revised by Origen, and the sixth the translation by Theodotion. However, as only two languages, Hebrew and Greek, were employed, the work should perhaps be called a diglot rather than a polyglot in the usual sense.

== Printed polyglots ==
Layouts

After the invention of printing and the revival of philological studies, polyglots became a favourite means of advancing the knowledge of Middle Eastern languages, for which no good references were available, as well as for the study of Scripture. In the 16th and 17th century, four well-known Biblical polyglots were published in Europe.

=== Complutensian Polyglot ===
The series began in 1514, with the Complutensian printed by Axnaldus Guilielmus de Brocario at the expense of Cardinal Ximenes. It was named after its place of translation, the Complutense University of Madrid at Alcalá de Henares. The first volume of this, containing the New Testament in Greek and Latin, was completed on 10 January 1514. In Volumes 2-5 (finished on 10 July 1517), the Hebrew text of the Old Testament was printed in the first column of each page, followed by the Latin Vulgate and then by the Septuagint version with an interlinear Latin translation. Below these stood the Chaldee, again with a Latin translation. The sixth volume containing an appendix is dated 1515. However, the death of supporter Cardinal Francisco Ximénez de Cisneros, and the delay in receiving a papal sanction until March 1520, meant that the series was apparently not issued until 1522. The chief editors were Juan de Vergara, López de Zúñiga (Stunica), Hernán Núñez (Pincianus), Antonio de Nebrija (Nebrissensis), and Demetrius Ducas.

=== Antwerp Polyglot ===
About half a century after the Complutensian came the Antwerp Polyglot, printed by Christopher Plantin (1569-1572, in eight volumes folio). The principal editor was Arias Montanus. He was aided by Guido Fabricius Boderianus, Raphelengius, Masius, Lucas of Bruges, and others. This work was under the patronage of Philip II of Spain. It added a new language to those of the Complutensian by including the Syriac New Testament; and, while the earlier polyglot had only the Targum of Onkelos on the Pentateuch, the Antwerp Bible had also the Targum on the Prophets, and on Esther, Job, Psalms, and the Salomonic writings.

=== Paris Polyglot ===
Next came Guy Michel Lejay's Paris Polyglot (1645). This was published in nine volumes. This embraces the first printed texts of the Syriac Old Testament (edited by Gabriel Sionita, a Maronite, but the Book of Ruth by Abraham Ecchellensis, also a Maronite) and of the Samaritan Pentateuch and version by Jean Morin (Morinus). It has also an Arabic version, or rather a series of various Arabic versions.

=== London Polyglot ===
The last great polyglot is Brian Walton's (London, 1654-1657). This is more complete in various ways than Le Jay's, including, among other things, the Syriac of Esther and of several apocryphal books for which it is wanting in the Paris Bible, Persian versions of the Pentateuch and Gospels, and the Psalms and New Testament in Ethiopic. Walton was aided by able scholars and used much new manuscript material. His prolegomena and collections of various readings mark an important advance in biblical criticism. It was in connection with this polyglot that Edmund Castell produced his famous Heptaglott Lexicon (two volumes folio, London, 1669), a monument of industry and erudition even when allowance is made for the fact that for the Arabic translating, he had used the great manuscript lexicon compiled and left to the University of Cambridge by William Bedwell. The six volume work was funded by public subscriptions.

The liberality of Cardinal Ximenes, who is said to have spent half a million ducats on it, removed the Complutensian polyglot from the risks of commerce. The other three editions all brought their promoters to the verge of ruin.

Subsequent polyglots are of little scholarly importance, the best recent texts having been confined to a single language; but at least into the early 20th century many biblical students still used Walton and, if it was available, Le Jay.

== Genoa psalter ==
The numerous polyglot editions of parts of the Bible include the Genoa psalter of 1516, also known as the Octaplum Psalter, as it showed eight languages; this was edited by Agostino Giustiniani, bishop of Nebbio. This is in Hebrew, Latin, Greek, Aramaic, and Arabic, and is interesting from the character of the Chaldee text, being the first specimen of Western printing in the Arabic writing system, and from a curious note on Christopher Columbus and the discovery of America on the margin of Psalm xix.

== See also ==
- Parallel text
- Early editions of the Hebrew Bible
