= Ibn al-Rāhib =

Coptic polymath and encyclopaedist

Abū Shākir ibn al-Rāhib (c. 1205 – c. 1295) was a Coptic polymath and encyclopaedist from the golden age of Christian literature in Arabic. He is a "towering figure" in Coptic linguistics and made important contributions to Coptic historiography.

== Family and career ==
Nushūʾ al-Khilāfa Abū Shākir ibn Sanāʾ al-Dawla al-Rāhib Abu ʾl-Karam Buṭrus ibn al-Muhadhdhib was born to a distinguished Coptic family of Old Cairo probably in the first decade of the 13th century, at least before 1235. His kin were mostly clergymen and officials of the Ayyūbid regime. His father, al-Shaykh al-Muʾtaman al-Sanāʾ Anbā Buṭrus al-Rāhib, was a prominent scribe in the Coptic community. He served as the finance minister of Egypt under the Ayyūbids and also de facto administrator of the patriarchate of Alexandria towards the end of the long vacancy of 1216–1235. He led the opposition to the patriarchate of Cyril III in 1235–1243. In old age, after the death of his wife, he became a monk, whence his nickname rāhib (monk) that appears in his son's nasab (patronymic). While a monk, he was appointed presbyter of the Church of Saint Sergius in Cairo.

In 1260, Ibn al-Rāhib was appointed deacon of the famous Hanging Church by Patriarch Athanasius III, whose election he had opposed. He served in the department of the army under the Ayyūbids. He seems to have left public life around the time the Mamlūks came to power (1250). All of his writing took place during the period from 1257 to 1270/1271. In the last two decades of his life he only edited his works. He is known to have been a contemporary of the patriarchs Cyril III, Athanasius III, Gabriel III, John VII and Theodosius III, whose pontificate lasted from 1294 to 1300. According to Adel Sidarus, he died between 1290 and 1295.

== Writings ==
Ibn al-Rāhib wrote on all the topics about which a Copt of his time could know: astronomy, chronology, history, philology, philosophy, theology and hermeneutics. Although appreciated for his original contributions, he is more valued today for his use and quotation of a very wide variety of sources, classical Greek, patristic and Islamic. Four of his works are known:

1. The Kitāb al-Tawārīkh (Book of Histories) is his most famous work. It is known from three manuscripts. It is divided into 51 chapters. The first 47 are devoted to chronology and astronomy, followed by one chapter each on world history, Islamic history, the history of the patriarchate of Alexandria and the seven ecumenical councils plus later councils accepted by the Copts. His work on the chronology of the patriarchs demonstrates his mathematical proficiency and is highly valuable to the historian.
  This book was highly influential. It was cited extensively by the Coptic historian Jirjīs al-Makīn, and then also by the Muslim historians al-Maḳrīzī and Ibn Khaldūn, although they are apparently reliant on al-Makīn. In the early 16th century, it was translated into Ethiopic by ichege Enbaqom. A chronological manual based on this text is known as the Abushaker (Abū Shākir). Already in the 13th century, an anonymous writer composed an epitome of the three historical chapters (48–50). This text, known as the Chronicon orientale, has been mis-attributed to Ibn al-Rāhib since the 17th century.
2. In 1263, he completed a work on the Coptic language, including a rhymed vocabulary and a grammar. Only the prologue and the grammar survive. Written in the tradition of Arabic lexicography, his grammar is superior to the other Coptic manuals of his time.
3. The Kitāb al-shifāʾ (Book of Healing), completed in 1267–68, is a work of Christology based exclusively on Biblical exegesis. It is a massive work structured around the notion of the Tree of Life with three trunks, each with three branches, each loaded with fruit. He quotes extensively from patristic sources and other Biblical commentaries, notably those of Ibn al-Ṭayyib.
  An autograph copy of this is preserved in the Bibliothèque nationale de France in Paris. It is dated to anno mundi 984, which corresponds to anno Domini 1268. A copy of this work dated AM 1398 (AD 1611) is also preserved in the patriarchal library in Cairo.
4. The Kitāb al-Burhān (Book of Evidence), completed in 1270–71, is a work of canon law, theology, ethics and philosophy in 50 chapters. The theodicy of Ibn al-Rāhib is taken from the Persian Muslim theologian Fakhr al-Dīn al-Rāzī. There is copy dated AM 987 (AD 1270) in the patriarchal library.

== See also ==
- Abu ʾl-Barakāt ibn Kabar
