= Masius (surname) =

Masius is a surname. Notable people with the surname include:

- Andreas Masius (1514–1573), Catholic priest and humanist
- Ghisbertus Masius
- Hector Gottfried Masius, German-Danish Lutheran theologian
- Hermann Masius (1818–1893), German educator
- Joannes Masius
- John Masius (1950–2025), American writer
- Morton Masius, German-American physical chemist
