= Jean Morin (theologian) =

French theologian and biblical scholar (1591–1659)

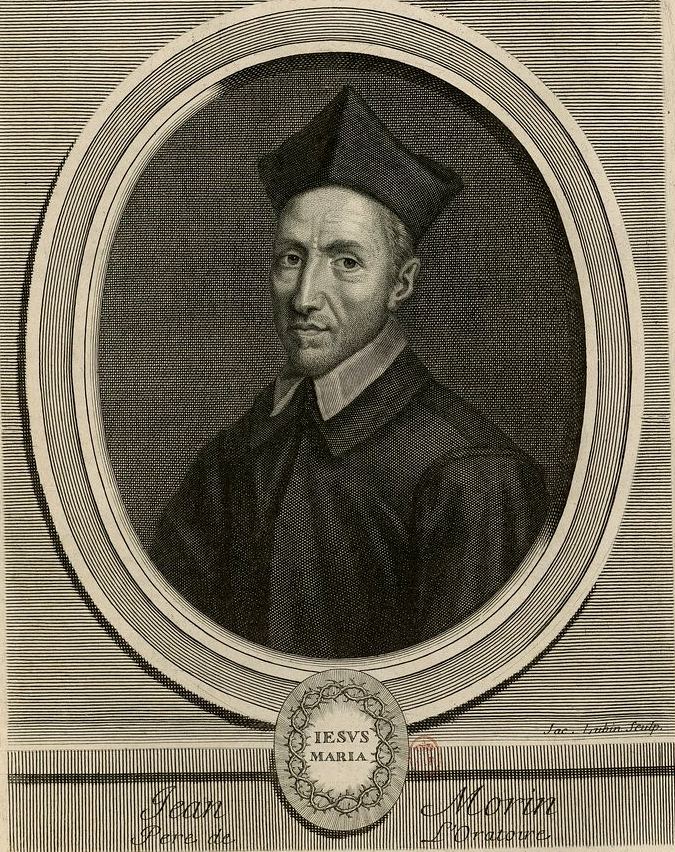
- Born: 1591; Blois, Kingdom of France
- Died: February 28, 1659 (aged 67–68); Paris, Kingdom of France
- Occupation(s): Theologian and biblical scholar
- Known for: Joannis Morini Congrefationis Oratorii Jesu Presbyteri

Jean Morin (Latin: Joannes Morinus) (1591 – 28 February 1659) was a French theologian and biblical scholar. His linguistic studies of biblical manuscript material, newly available, were taken to polemical lengths.

== Life ==
He was born in Blois, to Calvinist parents. He learned Latin and Greek at La Rochelle, and continued his studies in Leiden, subsequently moving to Paris. His conversion to the Catholic Church is ascribed to Cardinal du Perron.

In 1618 he joined the congregation of the Oratory, and in due course took priest's orders. At first he was superior in houses of his congregation at Orléans and Angers. In 1625 he visited England in the train of Henrietta Maria; in 1640 he was at Rome, on the invitation of Pope Urban VIII, who received him with special favor. He was, however, soon recalled to Paris by Richelieu, and the rest of his life was spent in incessant literary labor.

== Works ==
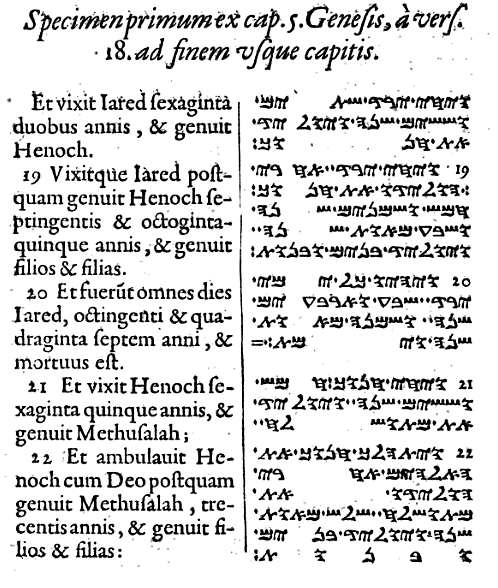
Genesis 5:18–22 as published by Jean Morin in 1631 in the first publication of the Samaritan Pentateuch

The Histoire de la délivrance de l'Église chrétienne par l'empereur Constantin, et de la grandeur et souveraineté temporelle donnée a l'Église romaine par les rois de France (1630) gave great offence at Rome, and a Declaration (1654), directed against faults in the administration of the Oratory, was strictly suppressed.

Morin is best known for his biblical and critical work. By his editing of the Samaritan Pentateuch and Targum, in the Paris Polyglott, he gave the first impulse in Europe to the study of this dialect, which he acquired without a teacher (framing a grammar for himself) by the study of manuscripts newly brought to Europe. Not unnaturally, he formed a very exaggerated view of the value of the Samaritan tradition of the text (Exercitationes ecclesiasticae in utrumque Samaritanorum Pentateuchum, 1631). A similar tone of extreme depreciation of the Masoretic Hebrew text, colored by polemical bias against Protestantism, affects his major work, the posthumous Exercitationes biblicae de hebraeici graecique textus sinceritate (1660), in which, following in the footsteps of Cappellus, he brought arguments against the then current theory of the absolute integrity of the Hebrew text and the antiquity of the vowel points.

== Publications ==
- Histoire de la délivrance de l'Église par l'empereur Constantin, et de la grandeur et souveraineté temporelle donnée à l'Église romaine par les rois de France, Paris, 1630.
- Commentarius historicus de disciplina in administratione sacramenti Poenitentiae tredecim primis seculis in ecclesia occidentali, et huc usque in orientali observata, in decem libros distinctus, Henri Fricx, Bruxelles, 1685. (1re éd. à Paris en 1651).
- Antiquitates Ecclesiae Orientalis, Clarissimorum Virorum... Dissertationibus Epistolicis enucleatae; Nunc ex Ipsis Autographis Editae, Geo. Wells, London 1682. Published by Richard Simon.
- Commentarius de sacris Ecclesiae ordinationibus secundum antiquos et recentiores Latinos, Graecos, Syros et Babylonios in tres partes distinctos, first edition 1655, second edition Amsterdam 1695.
- Exercitationes ecclesiastiae in utrumque Samaritorium Pentateuchum (Paris, 1631). In it Morin argued for the superiority of the Samaritan text of the Septuagint over the Hebrew, a thesis to which he returned in Exercitationes biblicae de Hebraei Graecique textus sinceritate (Paris, 1663,1669, 1686).
- Commentarius historicus de disciplina in administratione sacramenti Poenitentiae XIII primus saeculis (Paris, 1651)
- Commentarius sacris Ecclesiae ordinationibus (Paris 1655, Antwerp 1695, Rome, 1751).
