= Copto-Arabic literature =

Literature written by Copts in Arabic

A bilingual book of prayers from the 17th or 18th century, with Coptic and Arabic text

Copto-Arabic literature is the literature of the Copts written in Arabic. It is distinct from Coptic literature, which is literature written in the Coptic language.

Copto-Arabic literature began in the 10th century, had its golden age in the 13th and declined in the late medieval and early modern period before experiencing a revival in the 19th century.

== History ==
Arabic was introduced to Egypt after the Arab conquest in 641. Coptic was used alongside Arabic in the administration of the country and some bilingual documents were produced in the 7th century. In 705, however, Arabic became the sole official language for administrative purposes. It gradually replaced Coptic as both the spoken and literary language of the Copts in a process that took several centuries. This process was much slower in Egypt than in Syria and Palestine, where the populace spoke Aramaic, a language much closer to Arabic. Palestinian Christian writing in Arabic precedes Egyptian by two centuries. There is little evidence of Copto-Arabic writing prior to the 10th century.

=== Origins ===
The first Copto-Arabic authors are the Melkite patriarch Eutychius (d. 940) and the Coptic Orthodox bishop Sāwīrus ibn al-Muqaffaʿ (d. 987). Eutychius wrote a universal history down to the caliphate of al-Rāḍī (934–940). This work was later continued by Yaḥyā ibn Saʿīd al-Anṭākī. Eutychius also wrote an apologetic treatise defending the Melkite faith against both Coptic Orthodoxy and Islam, entitled Kitāb al-jadal bayn al-mukhālif wa-l-Naṣrānī.

Sāwīrus wrote a refutation of Eutychius treaty from an Orthodox perspective. He wrote at least 38 identifiable works in Arabic, mostly on Christian matters but also on psychology, medicine and Arabic proverbs. He is the most important early figure in Copto-Arabic literature. Sāwīrus's friend and contemporary, Būluṣ ibn Rajāʾ, a convert from Islam, wrote in Arabic a critique of his old faith, the Kitāb al-wāḍiḥ bi-l-ḥaqq, that was later translated into Latin and had a major influence in the West.

=== Golden age ===
By the late 11th century, Arabic was beginning to supersede Coptic and there was a clear decline in the knowledge of Coptic among Egyptian Christians. The Confession of the Fathers was compiled around 1078 in Arabic from Coptic sources. A Copto-Arabic translation movement flourished in the 11th and 12th centuries under the Fatimids.

Under the Ayyubids in the early 13th century, Copto-Arabic experienced a renaissance. This was spearheaded by four prominent brothers, the Awlād al-ʿAssāl. One of the products of this period was a new translation of the New Testament into Arabic based on the original Greek, Coptic translations and Syriac translations. The brothers al-ʿAssāl also wrote in defence of the literary merit of the New Testament and produced a bilingual Coptic–Arabic dictionary and a Coptic grammar in Arabic. They developed their own "Asʿadī" style of handwriting.

Copto-Arabic historiography also experienced a rebirth under the late Ayyubids. The major work was begun by al-Makīn Jirjis ibn al-ʿAmīd and continued in the Mamluk period by al-Mufaḍḍal ibn Abi ʾl-Faḍāʾil. The "peak of the golden age" was reached in the writings of Ibn Kabar, who died in 1324.

The first Arabic translations of hymns and other liturgical texts from Coptic probably took place in the 13th or 14th century. These were necessitated by the decline in the use of Coptic among the people. Coptic texts, however, remained the norm in the monasteries.

=== Decline and revival ===
The encyclopaedic work of Ibn Sibāʿ (c. 1300) on the offices and traditions of the Coptic church marks the start of a decline of Copto-Arabic writing. The nadir of Copto-Arabic corresponds to that of Egyptian Islamic culture under the Ottoman Empire from 1518 to 1798. It was Pope Cyril IV (d. 1861) who reformed Copto-Arabic writing by establishing schools.

In the early 20th century, there were two Coptic newspapers, al-Waṭan and Miṣr. There was a flowering of modern Coptic literature in Arabic following the assassination of the Prime Minister Boutros Ghali in 1910 and the Congress of Asyūṭ in 1911. This was a period which saw unity of purpose between Coptic and Muslim Egyptians against the British regime, culminating in the Egyptian Revolution of 1919.

== Genres ==
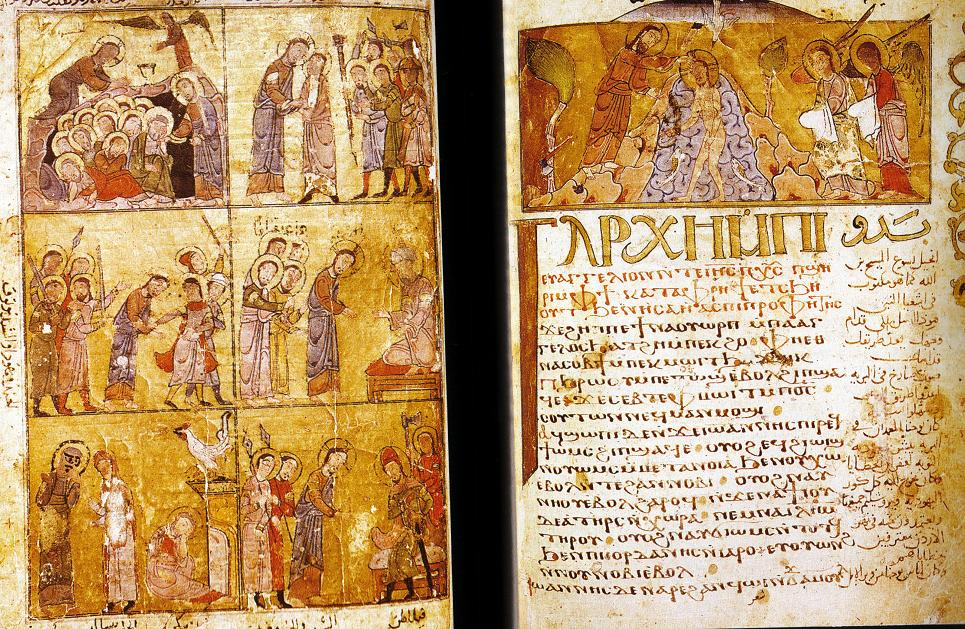
A 13th-century illuminated bible in Coptic and Arabic

=== Apocalyptic ===
Several Coptic-language apocalypses were later translated into Arabic. These include the Apocalypse of Pseudo-Athanasius, Apocalypse of Samuel of Kalamoun, Letter of Pseudo-Pisentius and Visions of Shenute. There were also apocalyptic texts composed in Arabic. Copto-Arabic apocalyptic was usually pseudonymous served to allow criticism of Islamic authorities from the safety of (feigned) temporal distance. It incorporated the legend of the Last Roman Emperor, but always portrayed the Coptic church was triumphant over the Chalcedonian.

=== Canon law ===
Ibn al-Rāhib and Pope Cyril III (d. 1243) both wrote works on canon law. In addition, at least six Coptic nomocanons were written in Arabic. Only five these are preserved today, one by Pope Gabriel II (d. 1145) being lost. The 13th-century nomocanon of al-Ṣafī ibn al-ʿAssāl forms the basis of the Ethiopian Fetha Nagast.

=== Catechesis ===
There is a sequence of catechetical texts in Arabic from the 10th or 11th century through the 13th. The first is the Kitāb al-īḍāḥ, written in a straightforward style. Its preface notes how Islamic terminology was becoming better known in Christian circles than traditional Christians terminology. Next in sequence is the anonymous Kitāb al-muʿallim wa-l-tilmīdh, which is divided into ten questions. It contains a distinct Copto-Arabic version of the Jesus Prayer: "My Lord Jesus, have mercy on me. My Lord Jesus, help me. My Lord Jesus, I praise and worship you." Two similarly titled works followed, one in eight questions by Marqus ibn al-Qunbar and one in twenty-two chapters by the future Cyril III.

=== Coptic linguistics ===
The first Coptic grammars were written in Arabic in the 13th century. There was no prior history of grammatical writing in Coptic or in earlier Egyptian. Copto-Arabic grammatical writing was inspired entirely by the existing Arabic linguistic tradition practised among Muslims.

Coptic lexicography in Arabic originates around the same time as grammar, but it has antecedents in Coptic and Greek going back to late antiquity. One 13th-century Copto-Arabic lexicographical treatise, al-Sullam al-ḥāwī ("The Comprehensive Ladder"), contains as an appendix an Arabic–Old French glossary with the French in Coptic script.

=== Hagiography ===
Many early Coptic saints' lives were translated into Arabic. Many new Arabic lives were also written.

The Copto-Arabic Synaxarion is a collection of short biographies of saints, especially martyrs, perhaps first collected in the early 13th century, but attaining a final form only in the 14th. It is a synaxarion, the biographies intended to be read as part of the service of any given day.

=== Historiography ===
The annals of Eutychius are the first work of Arabic Egyptian historiography. The continuation of Yaḥyā may have been started in Egypt, but was finished in 10334 in Syria. Yaḥyā also composed a work of computus, known through quotation by Ibn al-Rāhib.

Two early works of Coptic-language historiography were translated into Arabic. John of Nikiu's chronicle had little influence. Both the Coptic and Arabic versions are lost; only an Ethiopic version survives. Much more influential was the Taʾrīkh baṭārikat al-Iskandariyya l-Qibṭ, a series of biographies of the Coptic Orthodox patriarchs. The Arabic translation was undertaken in the late 11th century by Mawhūb ibn Manṣūr ibn Mufarrij. It was subsequently continued with original, short biographical notices in Arabic.

In the late 12th century, Abū al-Makārim began a guidebook on the churches and monasteries of Egypt. It was expanded in the early 13th century with the addition of numerous historical notices into the History of the Churches and Monasteries of Egypt. Also from the 13th century is a lost universal history ending in 1217–1218 by a certain Bishop Abrīm. This might be the same work as the Tārīkh li-baʿḍ al-Ṣaʿīdiyyīn mentioned by Ibn al-Rāhib.

=== Poetry ===
Copto-Arabic poetry is known from as early as the 13th century. The early 20th century saw a surge in production, but there are no Coptic poets in Arabic comparable to the best Egyptian Muslim poets.

=== Theology and philosophy ===
Copto-Arabic theology prior to the 13th century was primarily didactic, pastoral and apologetico-polemic (directed at either other Christian denominations or Islam). In the 13th century there was a turn towards a more systematic, even encyclopaedic, approach based in logic and philosophy and heavily influenced by Islamic kalām. Theologians of this period produced works very similar in style to the summae being produced at the same time in the Latin West.

The most prominent theologians of the Copto-Arabic renaissance were al-Ṣafī ibn al-ʿAssāl, al-Muʾtaman ibn al-ʿAssāl, Ibn al-Rāhib, Ibn Kabar, al-Makīn Jirjis ibn al-ʿAmīd and Yūḥannā ibn Sabbāʿ.

== Allography ==
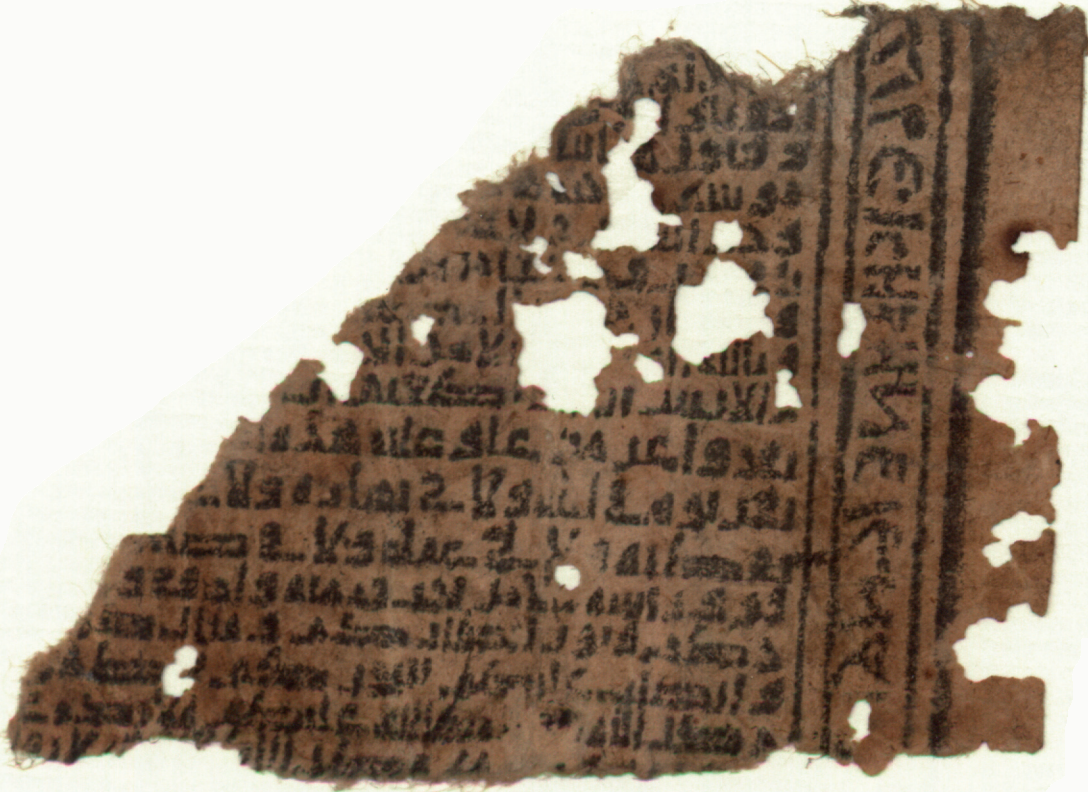
Fragment of a printed amulet with Arabic text, including a border in Coptic script (vertical text on the right)

William Worrell argues that Coptic went through three stages in its contact with Arabic. First, it borrowed the odd Arabic word. Second, while Coptic was still a living language, some texts were written in Arabic but in Coptic script (a practice known as allography). Finally, after having been completely supplanted as the spoken language by Arabic, Coptic was rendered as needed in Arabic script.

There is a fragmentary 13th-century manuscript in Arabic in Coptic script containing some of the Sayings of the Desert Fathers. It provides valuable information about the vernacular pronunciation of Arabic in Egypt at that time. The same practice in the case of Syriac script is known as Garshuni. The Copto-Arabic Sayings was probably created by one who spoke Arabic but was either educated in and more comfortable writing in Coptic or else saw Coptic script as the prestige written form for a religious work.

Medieval Arabic blockprinting produced some examples of amulets with Coptic lettering of Arabic text.

== List of writers ==
- Eutychius of Alexandria
- Sāwīrus ibn al-Muqaffaʿ
- Būluṣ ibn Rajāʾ
- Mawhūb ibn Manṣūr ibn Mufarrij al-Iskandarānī
- Ibn al-Qulzumī
- Mark III of Alexandria
- Abu Ṣāliḥ Yuʾannīs
- Ibn Mammātī
- Abū al-Makārim
- Abū Ṣāliḥ al-Armanī
- Maʿānī Abi ʾl-Makārim ibn Barakāt
- Marqus ibn al-Qunbar
- Cyril III of Alexandria
- al-Asʿad ibn al-ʿAssāl
- al-Muʾtaman ibn al-ʿAssāl
- al-Ṣafī ibn al-ʿAssāl
- al-Makīn Jirjis ibn al-ʿAmīd the Elder
- al-Makīn Jirjis ibn al-ʿAmīd the Younger
- al-Mufaḍḍal ibn Abi ʾl-Faḍāʾil
- Būlus al-Būshī
- Ibn al-Rāhib
- Ibn Kabar
- Ibn Kātib Qayṣar
- Yūḥannā ibn Sabbāʿ
- Ibn Sibāʿ
- Yūsāb of Fuwwa
- Athanasius of Qus
- Cyril IV of Alexandria
- 'Abd al-Masīḥ Ṣalīb al-Masū'dī
- Ḥabīb Jirjis
- Ya'qub Nakhla Rufayla

== List of works ==
=== Anonymous works ===
- Arabic–Old French glossary
- Copto-Arabic Sibylline prophecy
- Copto-Arabic synaxarion
- Chronicon orientale
- Kitāb al-īḍāḥ
- Kitāb al-muʿallim wa-l-tilmīdh
- Kebra Nagast
- History of the Churches and Monasteries of Egypt

=== Translations from Coptic ===
- Apocalypse of Pseudo-Athanasius
- Apocalypse of Samuel of Kalamoun
- Apocalypse of Shenute
- Arabic Homily of Pseudo-Theophilus of Alexandria

== Bibliography ==
- Aslanov, Cyril (2006). Evidence of Francophony in Mediaeval Levant: Decipherment and Interpretation (MS. Paris BnF Copte 43). Hebrew University Magnes Press.
- Atiya, Aziz Suryal (1991). "Literature, Copto-Arabic". In Aziz Suryal Atiya (ed.). The Coptic Encyclopedia. Vol. 5. New York: Macmillan Publishers. cols. 1460a–1467b.
- Baraz, Daniel (1993). "Coptic–Arabic Collections of Western Marian Legends: The Reception of a Western Text in the East – A Case of Intercultural Relations in the Late Middle Ages". In David W. Johnson (ed.). Acts of the Fifth International Congress of Coptic Studies. Vol. 2. The International Association for Coptic Studies. pp. 23–32.
- Bertaina, David (2020). "The Arabic Version of the Liber Denudationis: How Fāṭimid Controversies Shaped Medieval European Views of Islam". Islam and Christian–Muslim Relations. 31 (4): 425–443. doi:10.1080/09596410.2021.1872925. S2CID 231741701.
- Cöln, Franz Joseph (2013) [1917]. The Nomocanonical Literature of the Copto-Arabic Church of Alexandria. Gorgias Press.
- Gabra, Gawdat (2009). The A to Z of the Coptic Church. Scarecrow Press.
- Heijer, Johannes den (1994). "Apologetics in Copto-Arabic Historiography: The Life of Afraham Ibn Zurʿah, 62nd Patriarch of Alexandria". In Samir Khalil Samir; Jørgen Nielsen (eds.). Christian Arabic Apologetics during the Abbasid Period (750–1258). Brill. pp. 192–202.
- Moawad, Samuel (2014). "Coptic Arabic Literature: When Arabic Became the Language of Saints". In Lois F. Farag (ed.). The Coptic Christian Heritage: History, Faith, and Culture. Routledge. pp. 224–236.
- Richardson, Kristina (2021). Roma in the Medieval Islamic World: Literacy, Culture, and Migration. Bloomsbury Academic.
- Richter, Tonio Sebastian (2009). "Greek, Coptic and the 'language of the Hijra': The Rise and Decline of the Coptic Language in Late Antique and Medieval Egypt". In Hannah M. Cotton; Robert G. Hoyland; Jonathan J. Price; David J. Wasserstein (eds.). From Hellenism to Islam: Cultural and Linguistic Change in the Roman Near East. Cambridge University Press. pp. 401–446.
- Schwarb, Gregor (2014). "The 13th-Century Copto-Arabic Reception of Fakhr al-Dīn al-Rāzī: Al-Rashīd Abū l-Khayr Ibn al-Ṭayyib's Risālat al-Bayān al-aẓhar fī l-radd ʿalā man yaqūlu bi-l-qaḍāʾ wa-l-qadar". Intellectual History of the Islamicate World. 2 (1): 143–169. doi:10.1163/2212943X-00201010.
- Sidarus, Adel Y. (1978). "Coptic Lexicography in the Middle Ages: The Coptic Arabic Scalae". In R. McL. Wilson (ed.). The Future of Coptic Studies. E. J. Brill. pp. 125–142.
- Sidarus, Adel Y. (2002). "The Copto-Arabic Renaissance in the Middle Ages: Characteristics and Socio-Political Context" (PDF). Coptica. 1: 141–160.
- Sidarus, Adel Y. (2005). "Medieval Coptic Grammars in Arabic: The Coptic Muqaddimāt" (PDF). Journal of Coptic Studies. 3: 63–79. doi:10.2143/JCS.3.0.503607.
- Sidarus, Adel Y. (2014). "Copto-Arabic Universal Chronography Between Antiquity, Judaism, Christianity and Islam: The K. al-Tawārīkh of N. al-Khilāfa Abū Shākir Ibn al-Rāhib (655 Heg. / 973 Mart. / 1257 Chr. / 1569 Alex. / 6750 AM)". Collectanea Christiana Orientalia. 11: 221–250. doi:10.21071/cco.v11i.204. hdl:10396/13742. S2CID 191188192.
- Sidarus, Adel Y. (2018). "Medieval Copto-Arabic Historiography (13th–14th c.)". Collectanea Christiana Orientalia. 15: 157–183. doi:10.21071/cco.v15i.1074. hdl:10400.14/32760. S2CID 165267469.
- Sobhy, George P. G. (1926). "Fragments of an Arabic MS. in Coptic Script". In H. G. Evelyn White (ed.). The Monasteries of Wadi ʾn Natrûn, Part 1: New Coptic Texts from the Monastery of Saint Macarius. New York. pp. 231–269.
- Swanson, Mark (2014). "Copto-Arabic Literature". In Gawdat Gabra (ed.). Coptic Civilization: Two Thousand Years of Christianity in Egypt. The American University in Cairo Press. pp. 153–161.
- Worrell, William H. (1934). Coptic Sounds. University of Michigan Press.
