= Garshunography =

Using the script of one language to write another

Start of a 16th-century Garshuni copy of the Arabic Sibylline prophecy

Garshunography is the use of "the script of one language to write utterances of another language which already has a script associated with it sociolinguistically". The phenomenon has also been called allography or heterography, although both these terms have other uses, the former to denote different shapes of the same grapheme and the latter to denote different spellings of homophones. In French, the term métagrammatisme has also been proposed. The term "garshunography" comes from Garshuni, a term of uncertain origin that refers to the writing of the Arabic language in the Syriac script.

== Concept ==
George Kiraz identifies two sociolinguistic conditions for garshunography: "the source language is associated with a script that is perceived to be its own" and "there exists readership which is either unfamiliar with the script of the source language or prefers ... to use the target script." The adoption and adaptation of an existing script designed for one language for use by another is not garshunographic if the source language lacks a script that can be considered its own. The use of Chinese characters to write Japanese, Korean and Vietnamese cannot be considered garshunography because the languages "had no indigenous writing system prior to contact with sinography".

Likewise, for Kiraz, writing can transition from garshunographic to nongarshunographic over time if the adopted script becomes dominant. Both transitions are apparent in the history of Anatolian Turkish, which first adopted a variety of Arabic script and then transitioned to a variety of Latin script. Other scholars may draw a distinction between allography in a broad sense, which excludes writing in "the usual script", and allography in a strict sense, which excludes only writing systems "created ad hoc" or "heavily evolved or reworked". Although in both senses, "allography is more common than might be assumed at first", in the strict sense it covers Old Nubian writing, which used only a lightly modified form of the Greek alphabet, and even modern English orthography, which makes use of the Latin alphabet.

Garshunography should be distinguished from alloglottography, which is the practice of writing text in one language and reading it in another, and transliteration, since garshunography need not involve approximate letter-for-letter conversion.

== Examples ==
The term Garshuni has often been extended to refer to writing any language other than Syriac in the Syriac script and even to writing Syriac in other scripts. The Armenian, Azerbaijani, Kurdish, Malayalam, Persian, Sogdian and Turkish languages have all been written at some point in Syriac script. Other examples of garshunography include aljamiado, the use of Arabic script to write Romance languages; Judaeo-Spanish, which was originally written in the Hebrew alphabet; and Yiddish, a variety of High German originally written in Hebrew. In each of these cases, the practice is associated with a religious minority preserving its distinct identity through its choice of writing system. Since at least the 13th century, Samaritans have written Arabic texts in Samaritan script in order to mark them as sacred. Besides aljamiado, there are other examples of Arabic script used for languages with scripts of their own, including Belarusian Arabitsa, Serbo-Croatian Arebica and Chinese Xiao'erjing.

The Coptic alphabet originated as a case of garshunography, the use of the Greek alphabet to write the Egyptian language. William Worrell argues that the Coptic Egyptian went through three stages in its contact with Arabic. First, it borrowed the odd Arabic word. Second, while still a living language, some texts were written in Arabic but in the Coptic alphabet. Finally, after having been completely supplanted as the spoken and written language by Arabic, Coptic was rendered as needed in Arabic script. There are surviving examples of blockprinted amulets containing Arabic words in the Coptic alphabet, probably intended to be sold to Coptic Christians. In the case of the Arabic–Old French glossary from the period of the Crusades, French was written in the Coptic alphabet.

== See also ==
- Heterogram (linguistics)

== Bibliography ==
- Ashurov, Barakatullo (2015). "Sogdian Christian Texts: Socio-cultural Observations". Archiv orientální. 83 (1): 53–70. doi:10.47979/aror.j.83.1.53-70. S2CID 255253638.
- Bremer-McCollum, Adam (2019). "Two Languages, Two Scripts, Three Combinations: A (Personal?) Prayer-book in Syriac and Old Uyghur from Turfan (U 338)". Ancient Jew Review.
- Briquel Chatonnet, Françoise (2015). "Un cas d'allographie: le garshuni". Écriture et communication. Actes des congrès nationaux des sociétés historiques et scientifiques. Éditions du Comité des travaux historiques et scientifiques. pp. 66–75. ISBN 9782735508655.
- D'Ottone Rambach, Arianna; Internullo, Dario (2017). "One Script for Two Languages: Latin and Arabic in an Early Allographica Papyrus". Rivista degli studi orientali. Nuova serie. 90 (Suppl. 1): 53–72. JSTOR 45113189.
- King, Ross (2021). "Editor's Preface: Vernacular Reading in the Sinographic Cosmopolis and Beyond". Literary Sinitic and East Asia: A Cultural Sphere of Vernacular Reading. Brill. pp. ix–xl.
- Kiraz, George A. (2014). "Garshunography: Terminology and Some Formal Properties of Writing One Language in the Script of Another" (PDF). In Johannes den Heijer; Andrea Schmidt; Tamara Pataridze (eds.). Scripts beyond Borders: A Survey of Allographic Traditions in the Euro-Mediterranean World. Peeters. pp. 65–74.
- Kiraz, George A. (2015). "Note on the Term 'Garshunography'". Hugoye. 17 (2): 191–194. doi:10.31826/hug-2015-170111. S2CID 212687863.
- Kiraz, George A. (2019). "A Functional Approach to Garshunography". Intellectual History of the Islamicate World. 7 (2–3): 264–277. doi:10.1163/2212943X-00702003.
- Luffin, Xavier (2001). "Le phénomène du métagrammatisme dans le monde musulman: approche d'une étude comparative" (PDF). Acta Orientaba Academia Scientiarium Hungaricae. 54 (2–3): 339–360. doi:10.1556/AOrient.54.2001.2-3.7.
- Mengozzi, Alessandro (2010). "The History of Garshuni as a Writing System: Evidence from the Rabbula Codex". In F. M. Fales; G. F. Grassi (eds.). CAMSEMUD 2007: Proceedings of the 13th Italian Meeting of Afro-Asiatic Linguistics, held in Udine, May 21–24, 2007. S.A.R.G.O.N. Editrice e Libreria. pp. 297–304.
- Palombo, Cecilia (2022). "Embedding Conquest: Naturalizing Muslim Rule in the Early Islamic Empire" (PDF). Medieval Worlds. 17: 198–216. doi:10.1553/medievalworlds_no17_2022s198. S2CID 254356682.
- Richardson, Kristina (2022). Roma in the Medieval Islamic World: Literacy, Culture, and Migration. I.B. Tauris. ISBN 9781784537319. OCLC 1331904351.
- Schorch, Stefan (2020). "The Allographic Use of Hebrew and Arabic in the Samaritan Manuscript Culture". Intellectual History of the Islamicate World. 8 (1): 1–38. doi:10.1163/2212943X-00702008. S2CID 214451823.
- Worrell, William H. (1934). Coptic Sounds. University of Michigan Press.
