= Amid (disambiguation) =

Amid is an alternate name of Diyarbakır, a city in Turkey.

Amid may also refer to:

- Amid, West Azerbaijan, Iran
- ʿamīd, a title of rank
- Hasan Amid (1910–1979), Iranian lexicographer
- Maryam Amid (c. 1882–1919), Iranian journalist

== See also ==
- Ibn al-'Amid (disambiguation)
