= Tiburtine Sibyl =

Roman Sibyl

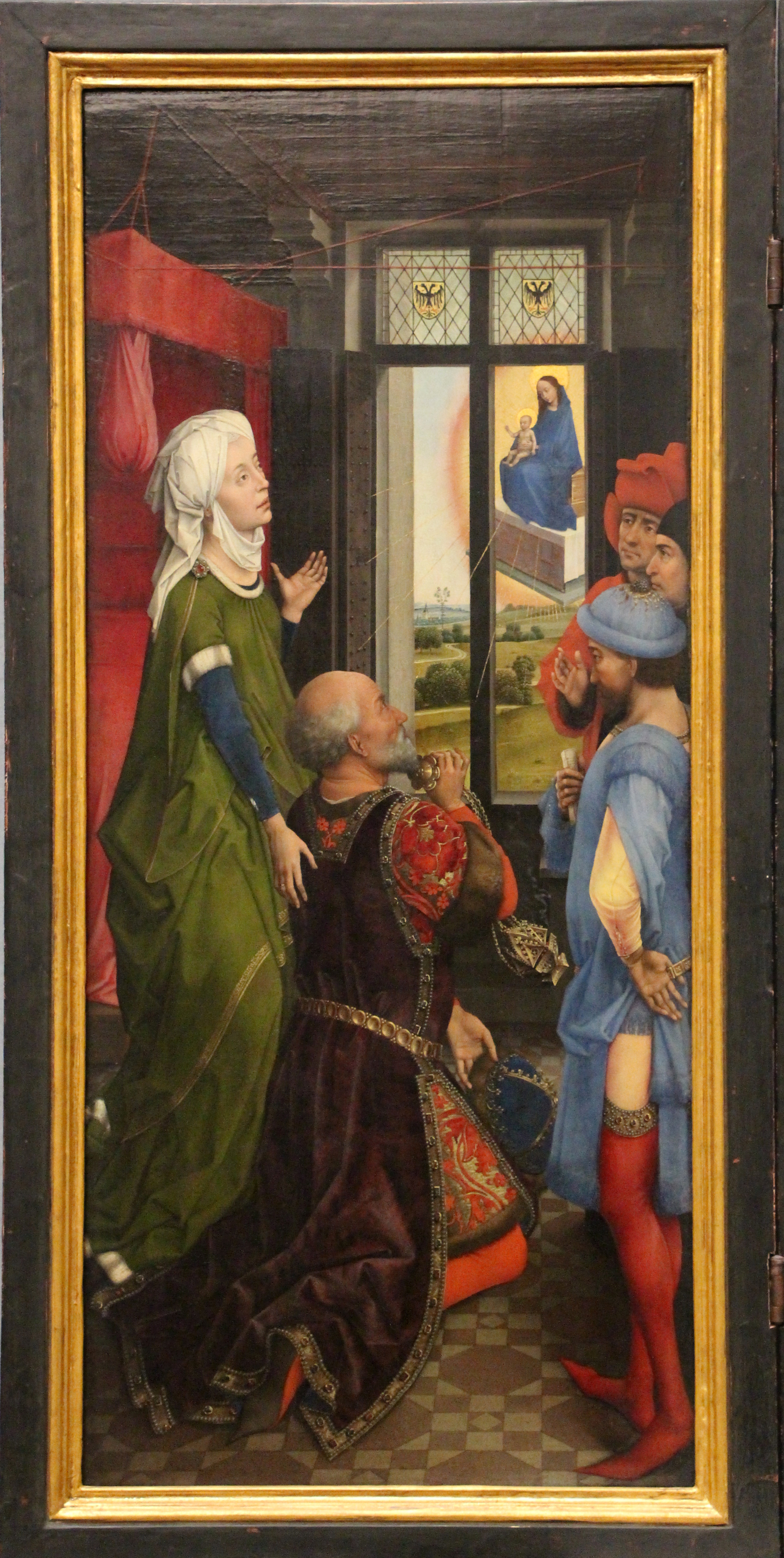
Rogier van der Weyden, wing of the Bladelin Altarpiece, c. 1450

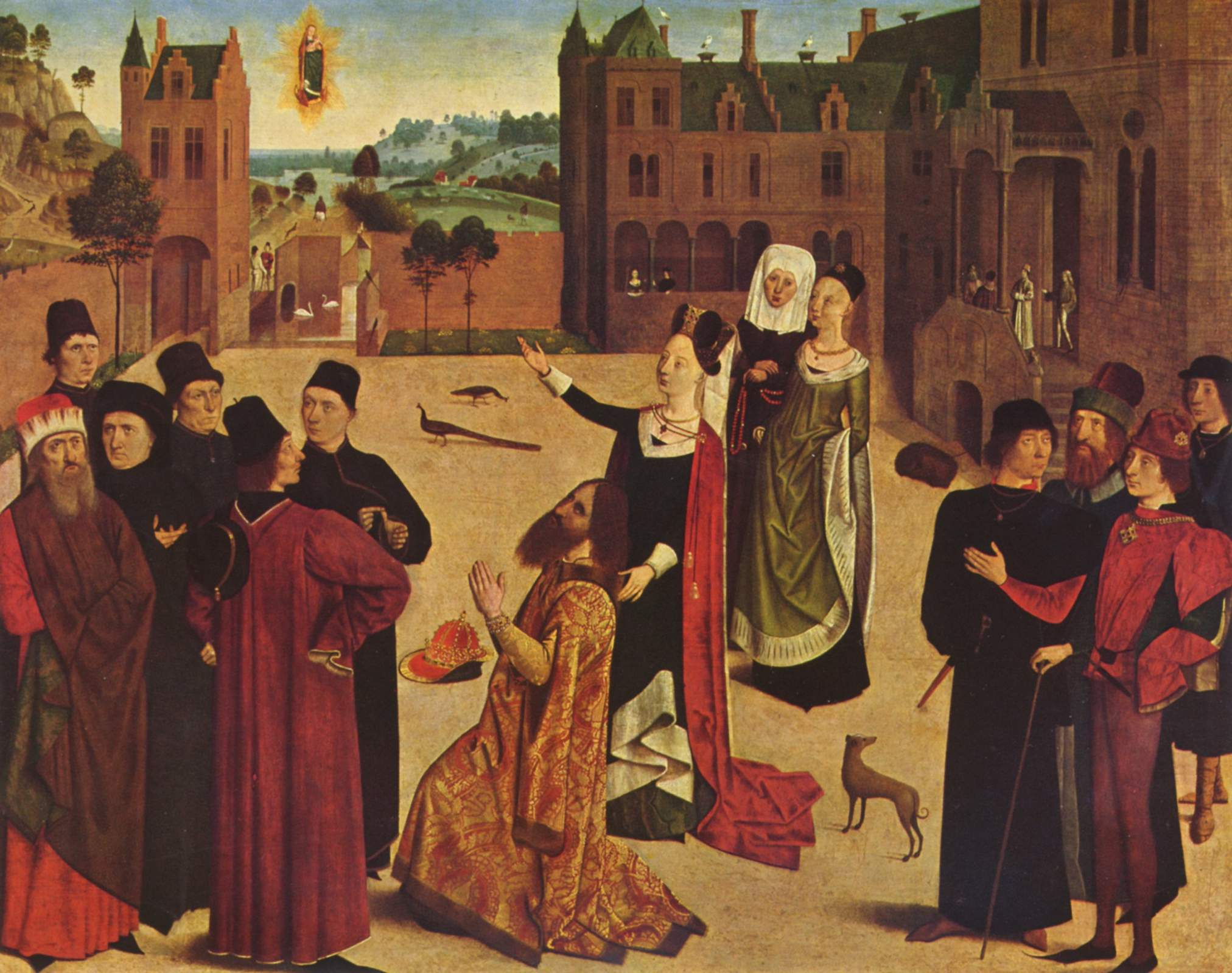
The Tiburtine Sibyl meets Augustus, Master of the Tiburtine Sibyl, Städelsches Kunstinstitut, Frankfurt.

The Tiburtine Sibyl, also called Albunea, was a Roman sibyl, whose seat was the ancient town of Tibur (modern Tivoli).

The mythic meeting of Augustus with the Sibyl, of whom he inquired whether he should be worshiped as a god, was often depicted by artists from the late Middle Ages onwards. In the versions known to the later Middle Ages, such as the account in the Golden Legend, Augustus asked the Sibyl whether he should be worshipped as a god, as the Roman Senate had ordered. She replied by showing him a vision of a young woman with a baby boy high in the sky, and a voice from the heavens said, "This is the virgin who shall conceive the saviour of the world", who would eclipse all of the Roman gods. The episode was regarded as a prefiguration of the Biblical Magi's visit to the new-born Jesus and connected Ancient and Christian Rome, implying foreknowledge of the coming of Christ by the greatest of Roman emperors.

Whether the sibyl in question was the Sibyl of Tibur or the Greek Sibyl of Cumae is not always clear. The Christian author Lactantius identified the sibyl in question as the Tiburtine sibyl and gave a circumstantial account of the pagan sibyls, which is useful mostly as a guide to their identifications as seen by 4th-century Christians:

The Tiburtine Sibyl, by name Albunea, is worshiped at Tibur as a goddess, near the banks of the Anio, in which stream her image is said to have been found, holding a book in her hand. Her oracular responses the Senate transferred into the capitol.

— Divine Institutes I.vi

== Prophecy of the Tiburtine Sibyl ==
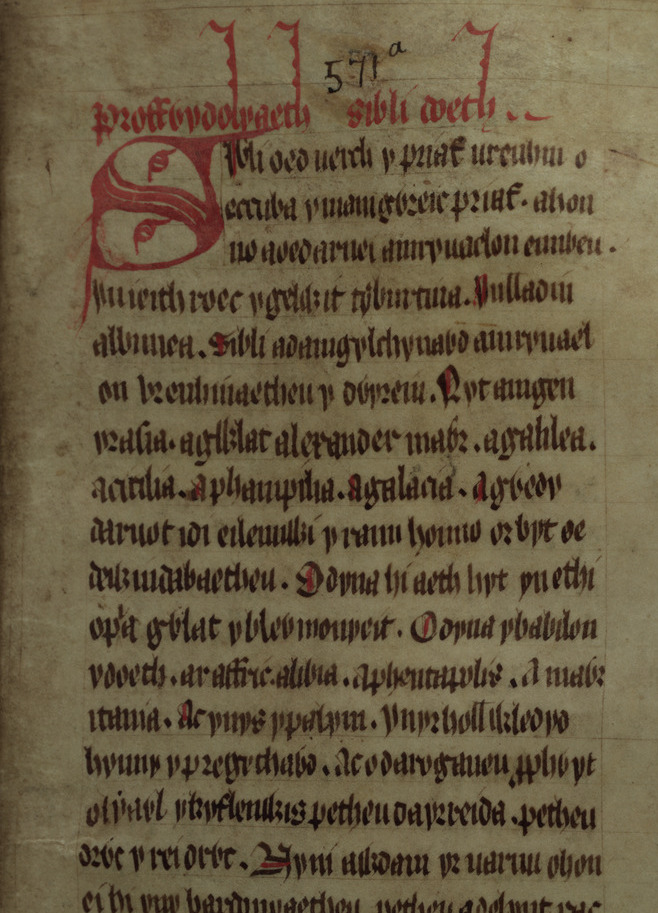
The opening lines of Proffwydoliaeth Sibli Ddoeth. Tiburtine Sibyl was adapted in Welsh in the 13th century and preserved within Llyfr Coch Hergest at Jesus College, Oxford, MS 111 (1385–1420).

An apocalyptic pseudo-prophecy exists among the Sibylline Oracles, which was attributed to the Tiburtine Sibyl. Its earliest version may date from the 4th century, but in the form that survives today, it was written in the early 11th century and was influenced by the Apocalypse of Pseudo-Methodius. Its first version in Latin dates from the 10th century and may have come from Lombardy though it was quickly picked up (and rewritten) by the Salian dynasty and the Hohenstaufens. It proved a useful rhetorical tool, valuable for many a ruler; the lists that it contains of emperors and kings were revised to fit the circumstances, and hundreds of versions remain from the Middle Ages.

Its conclusion purports to prophesy the advent in the world's ninth age of a final Emperor vanquishing the foes of Christianity (heavily dependent on the Apocalypse of Pseudo-Methodius):

Then will arise a king of the Greeks whose name is Constans. He will be king of the Romans and the Greeks. He will be tall of stature, of handsome appearance with shining face, and well put together in all parts of his body ...

This Emperor's reign is characterized by great wealth, victory over the foes of Christianity, an end of paganism and the conversion of the Jews. The Emperor having vanquished Gog and Magog,

After this he will come to Jerusalem, and having put off the diadem from his head and laid aside the whole imperial garb, he will hand over the empire of the Christians to God the Father and to Jesus Christ his Son.

In doing so, he will give way to the Antichrist:

At that time the Prince of Iniquity who will be called Antichrist will arise from the tribe of Dan. He will be the Son of Perdition, the head of pride, the master of error, the fullness of malice who will overturn the world and do wonders and great signs through dissimulation. He will delude many by magic art so that fire will seem to come down from heaven. ... When the Roman Empire shall have ceased, then the Antichrist will be openly revealed and will sit in the House of the Lord in Jerusalem.

The prophecy relates that Antichrist would be opposed by the Two Witnesses from the Book of Revelation, identified with Elijah and Enoch; after having killed the witnesses and started a final persecution of the Christians,

the Antichrist will be slain by the power of God through Michael the Archangel on the Mount of Olives.

== Frescoes at the Villa d'Este ==
Ippolito II d'Este rebuilt the Villa d'Este at Tibur, the modern Tivoli, from 1550 onward and commissioned elaborate fresco murals in the Villa that celebrate the Tiburtine Sibyl, as prophesying the birth of Christ to the classical world.

== Gallery ==
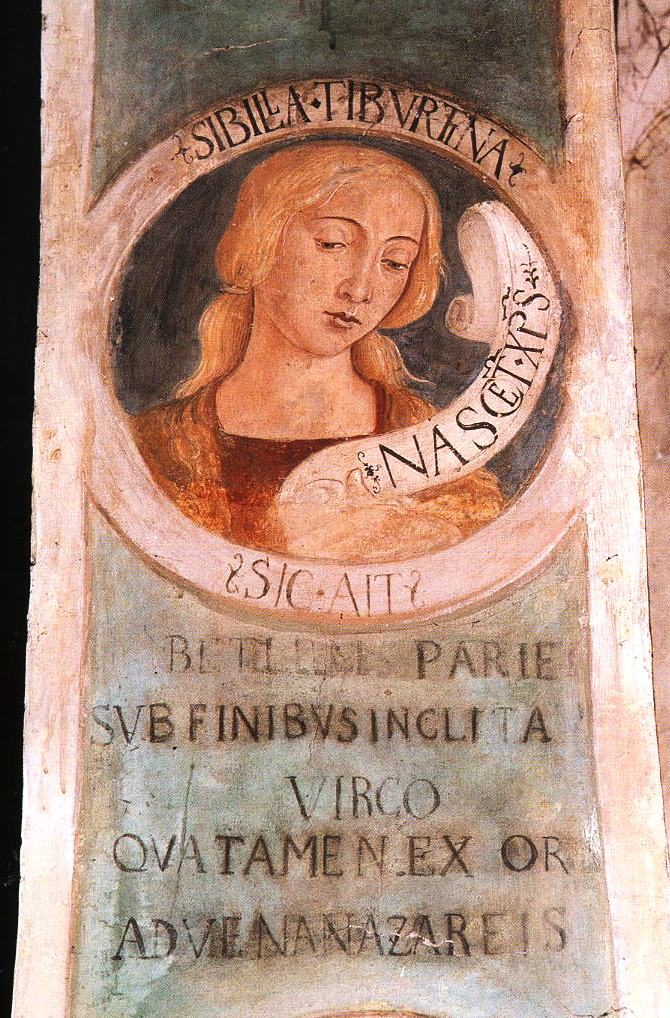
Fresco in the Church of St. John the Evangelist at Tivoli, 1483

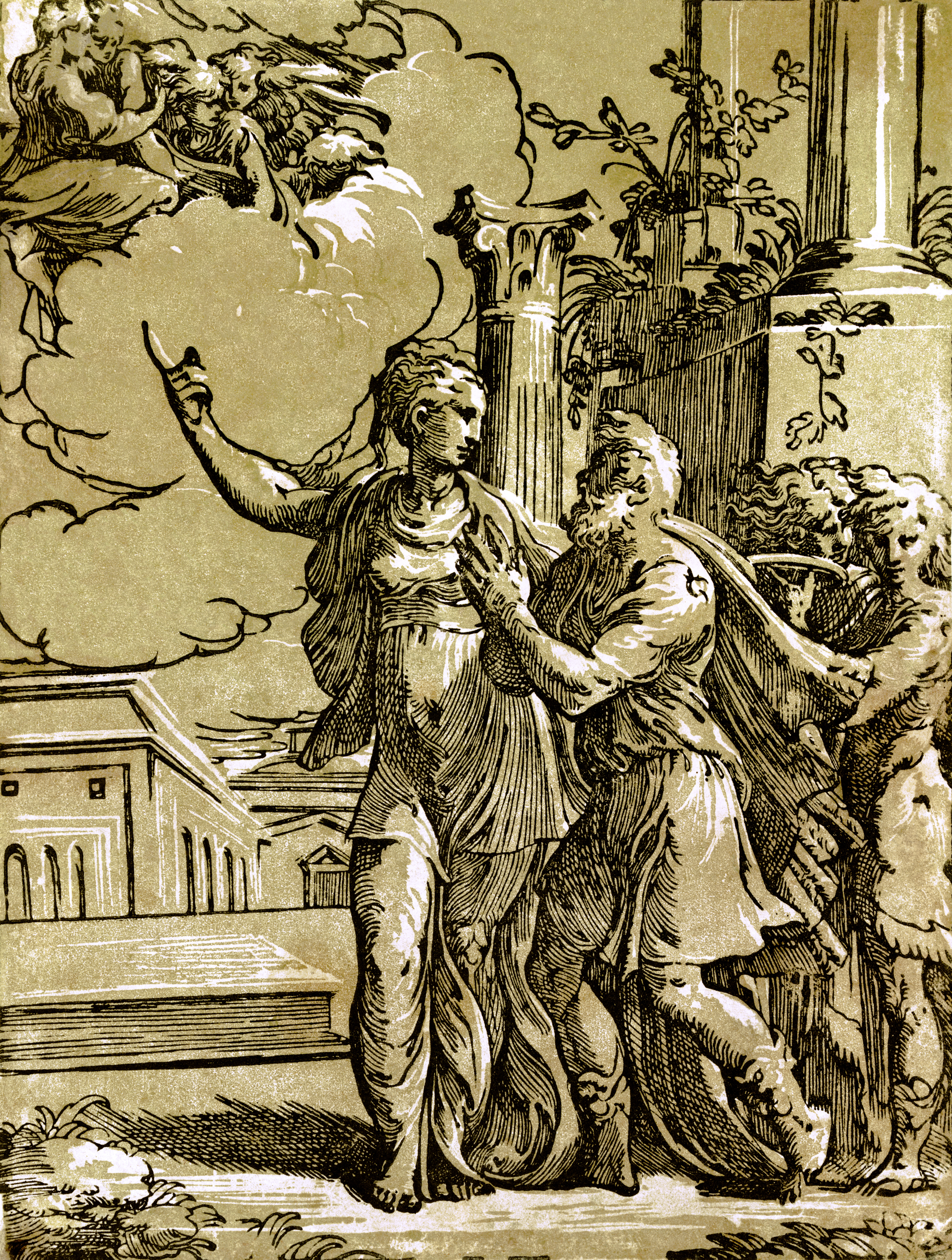
The Tiburtine sibyl and the Emperor Augustus, a 16th-century chiaroscuro woodcut by Antonio da Trento

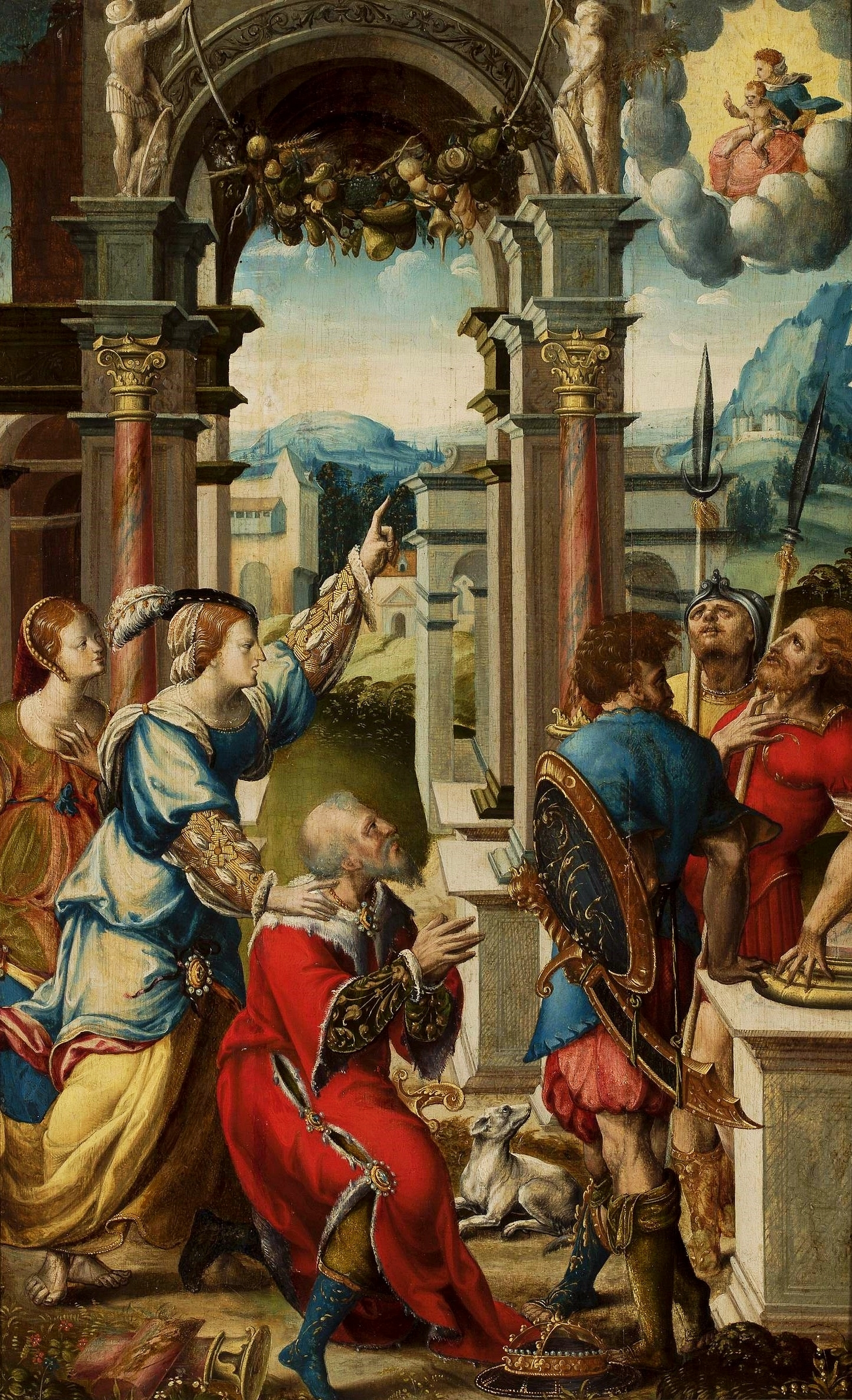
Emperor Augustus and the Sibyl of Tibur, 1520s painting by circle of Jan van Scorel, National Museum in Warsaw

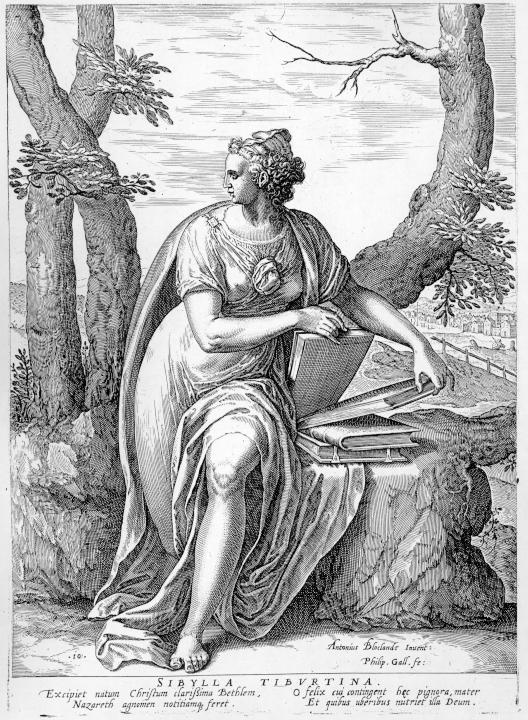
Engraving of the Tiburtine Sibyl by Philip Galle, after a design by Antony van Blokland, Antwerp, 1575.

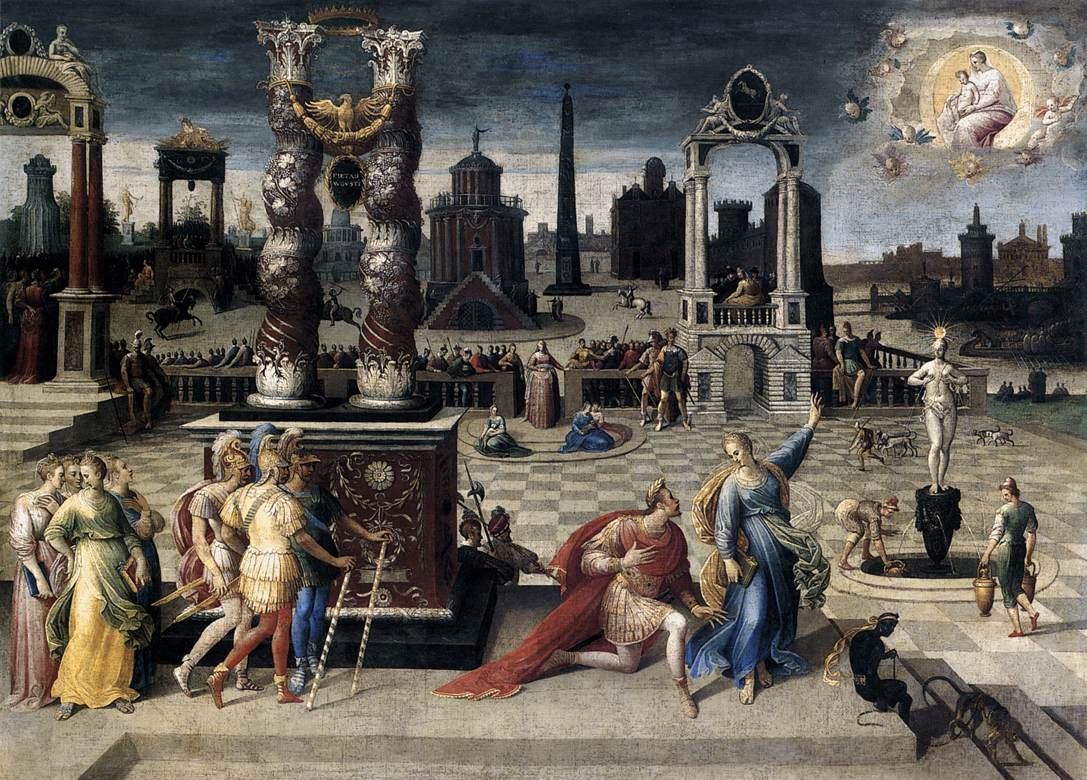
Augustus and the Sibyl, by Antoine Caron, Louvre Museum

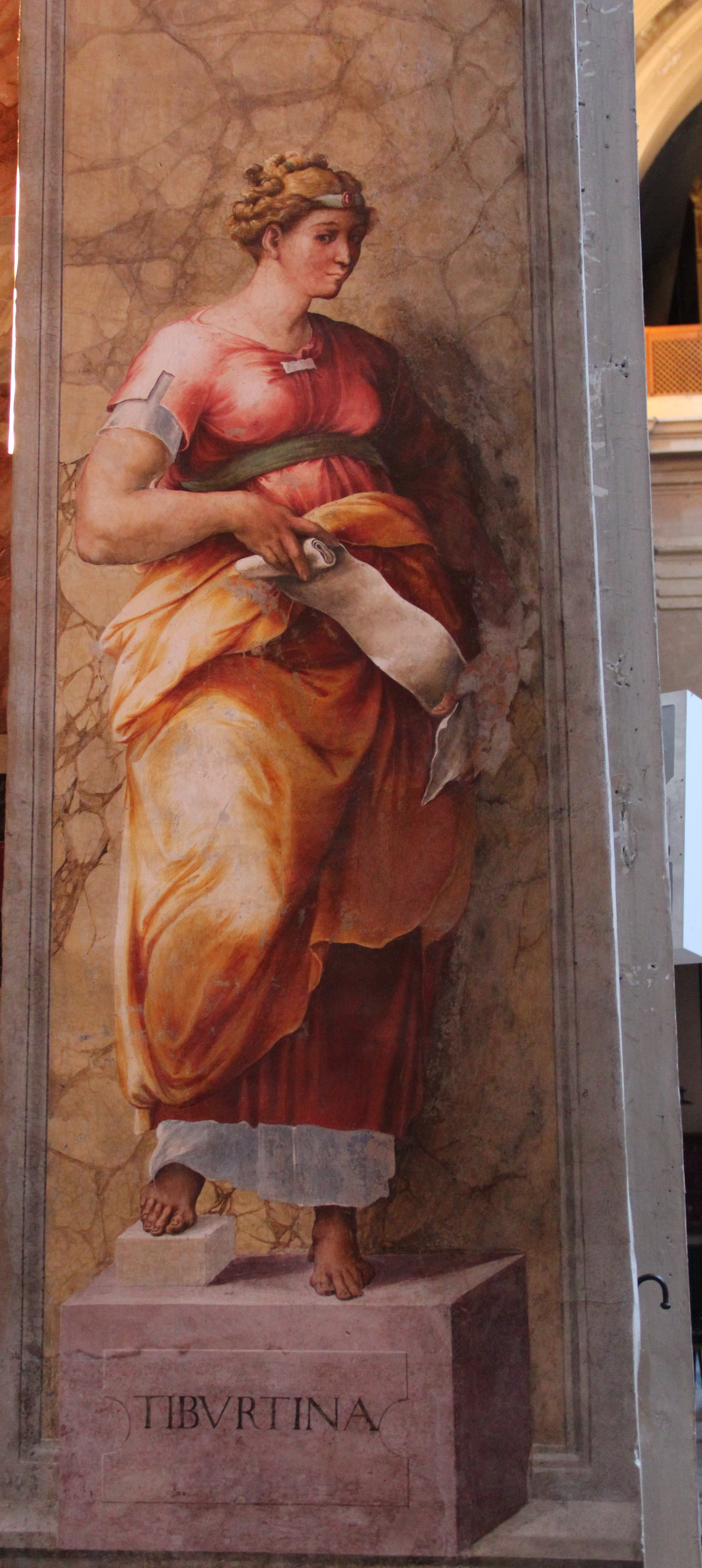
The Tiburtine Sibyl, Chapel Marciac, Church of Santissima Trinità dei Monti, Rome, sixteenth century. The work is of an anonymous artist.

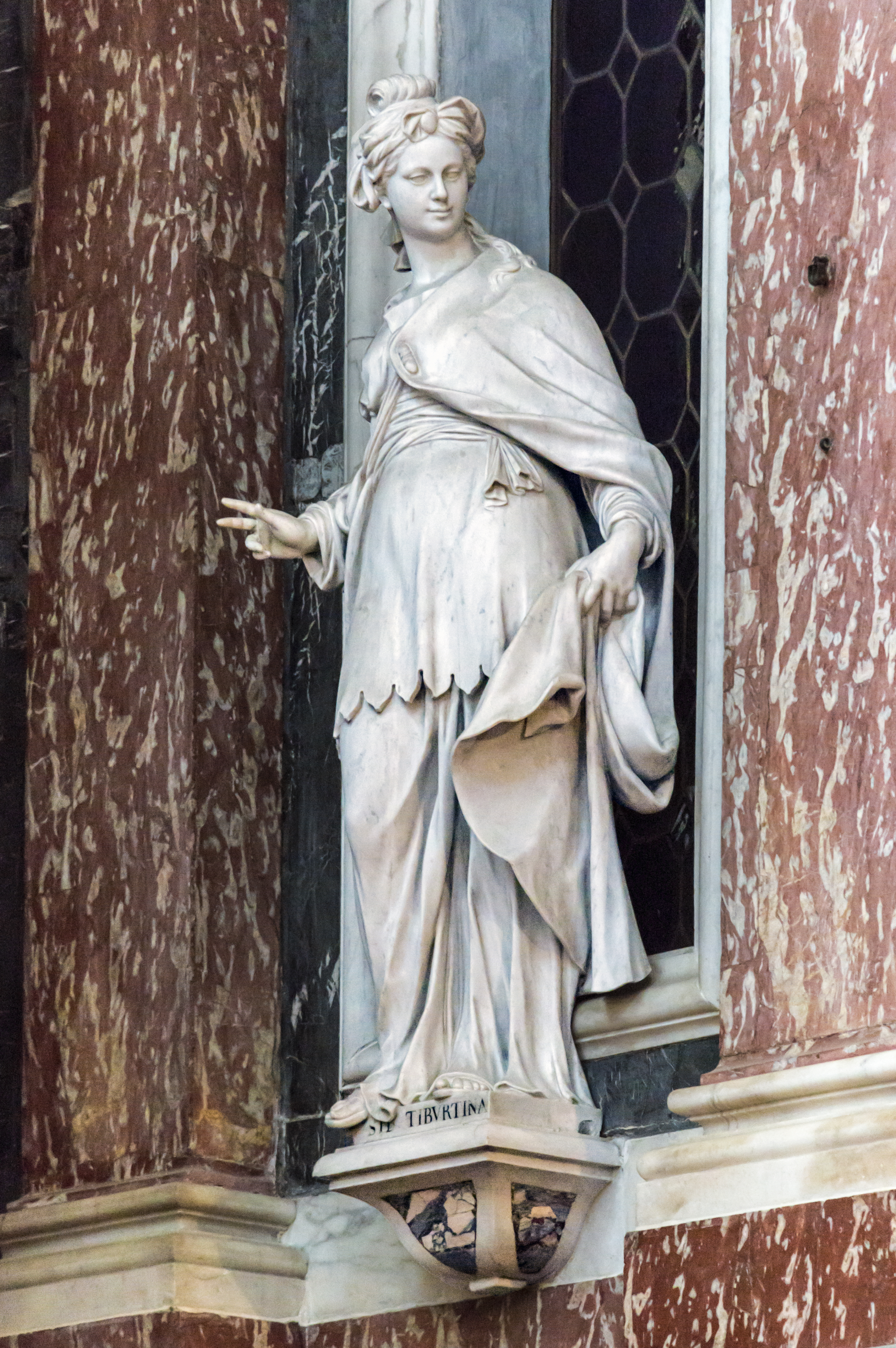
Statue of the Tiburtine Sibyl in Church of the Scalzi

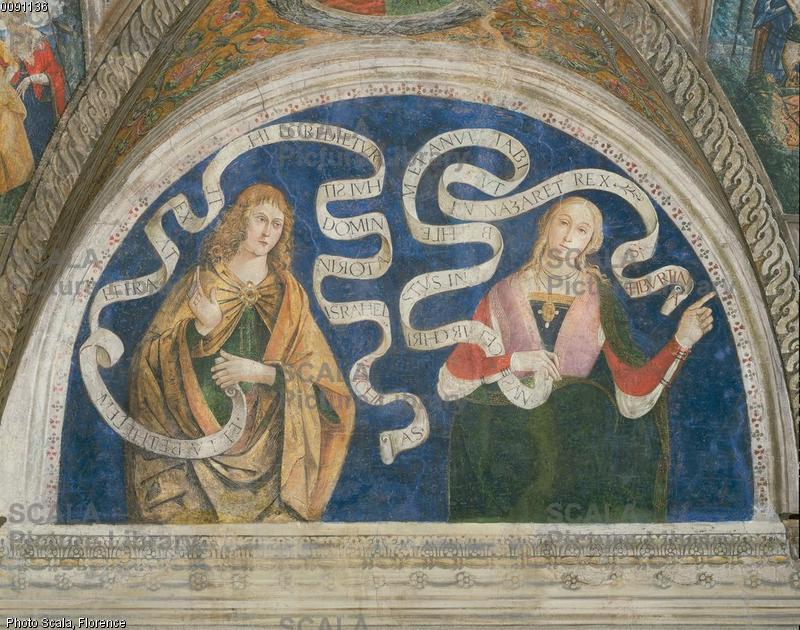
Micah and the Tiburtine Sibyl by Pinturicchio

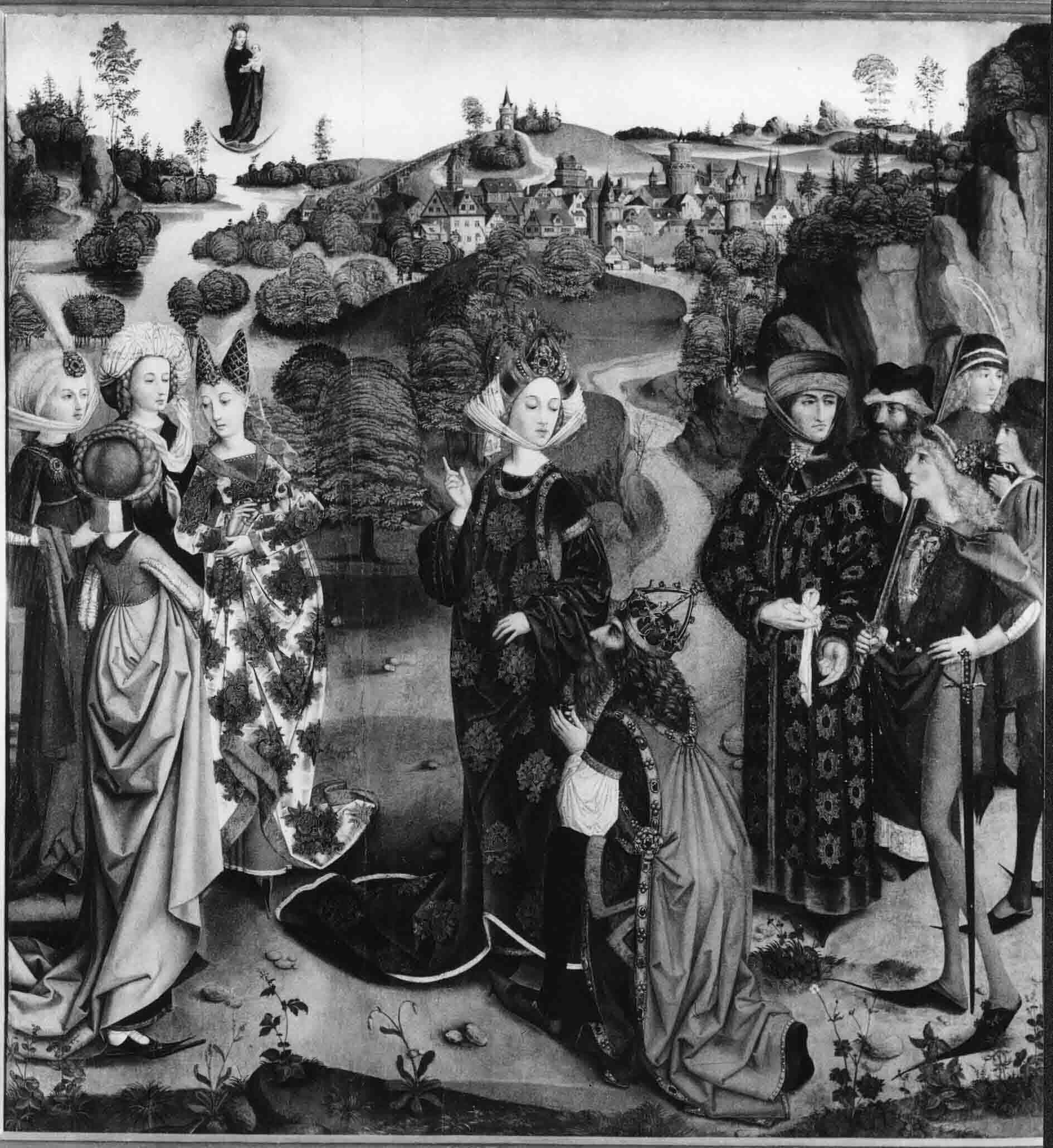
Augustus and the Tiburtine Sibyl by Wolfgang Katzheimer

== See also ==
- Arabic Sibylline prophecy
- Apocalypse of Pseudo-Methodius
- Temple of the Sibyl
