= Ugo da Carpi =

Italian painter

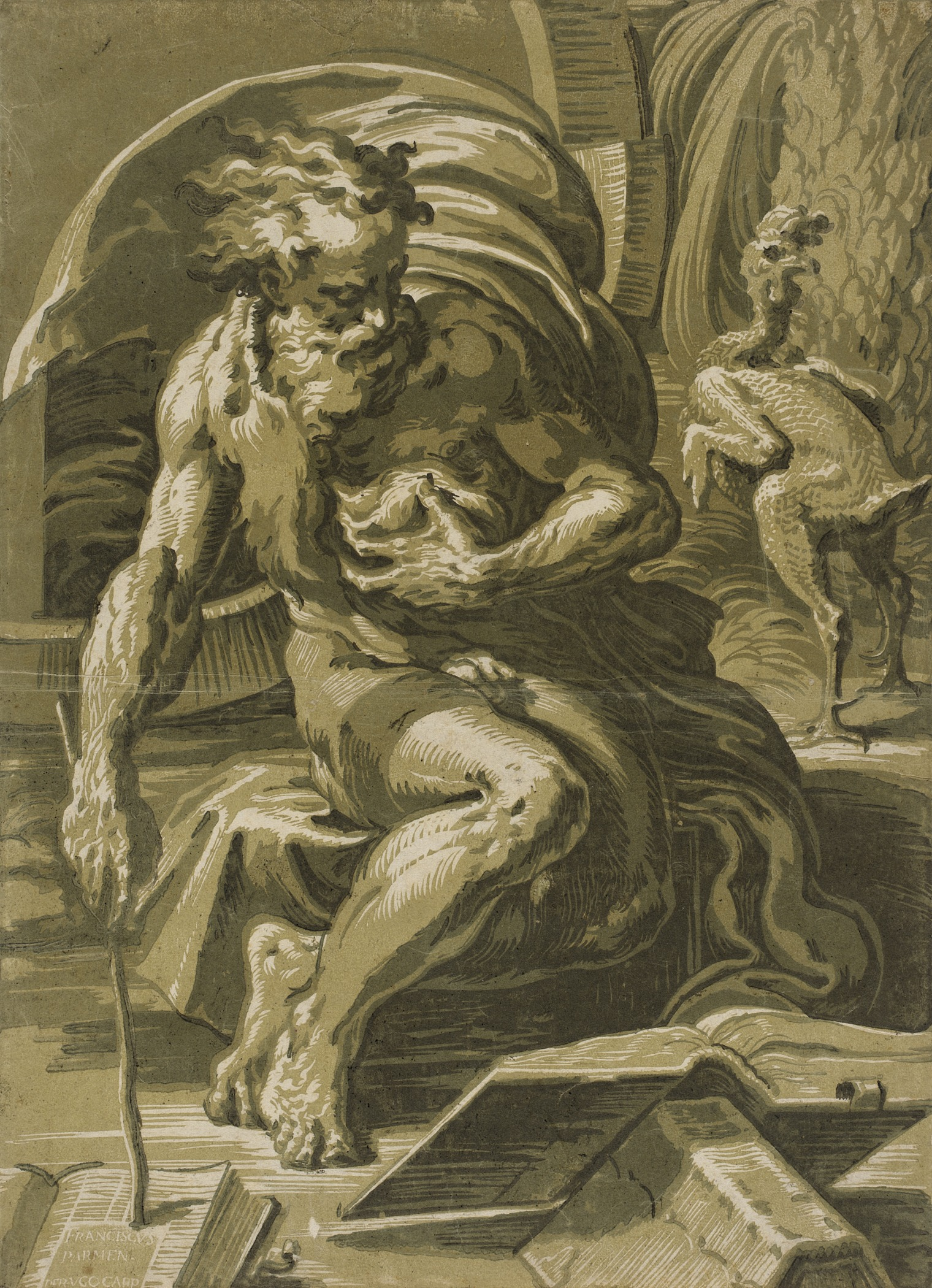
- Diogenes, chiaroscuro woodcut from 4 blocks
- Born: Ugo Panico c. 1450–1480 (sources vary); Carpe, Modena, Italy
- Died: c. 1523–1532 (aged 42–82); Bologna, Italy
- Known for: printmaking; chiaroscuro woodcut

Ugo da Carpi (c. 1450–1480 – c. 1523–1532) was an Italian printmaker active between 1502 and 1532 in the cities of Venice, Rome and Bologna. He is known for his technical and stylistic contributions to the chiaroscuro woodcut, a printmaking technique using blocks of different colours. Ugo claimed to be the first to use this technique, seeking a copyright first from the Venetian senate, and later from Pope Leo X. Although he did not create the chiaroscuro woodcut technique, he was one of the first Italian practitioners. He contributed to its development through his powerful style, focus on tonality and interpretive skills. One of his most famous works is a print of Diogenes. In addition to his numerous prints, he produced a writing book, and is also known to have produced at least one painting, the altarpiece of Saint Veronica in Saint Peter's Basilica in Rome.

== Biography ==
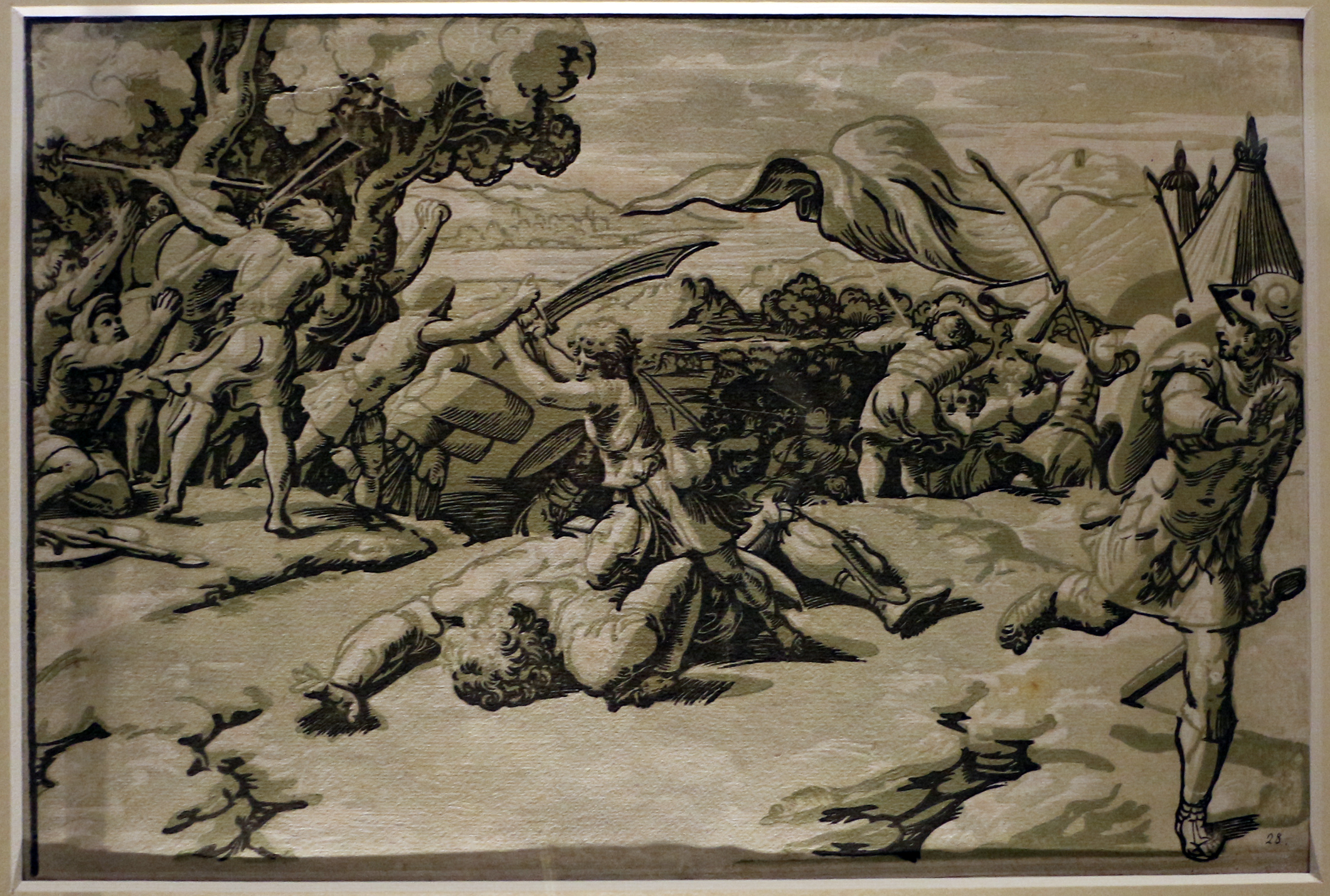
David Slaying Goliath, c. 1520, after Raphael, chiaroscuro woodcut with 3 blocks

=== Early life ===
Ugo da Carpi’s exact birth date is unknown. Some scholars estimate it to be as early as 1450, although others claim it is closer to 1480. He was the 10th of the 13 children of Count Astolfo da Panico and Elisabetta da Dallo. He was born in Carpi, a town in the province of Modena. He was known as Ugo Panico early in his life, only becoming Ugo da Carpi, which literally translates to "Ugo from Carpi", when he moved away from Carpi later in his life. The first historical evidence of Ugo is in the last will and testament of his father in 1490. There are records of Ugo buying and selling land in Carpi in 1495, 1496, and 1503. In 1509, records cite that his older brother carried out a land transaction for him, leading scholars to believe that Ugo left Carpi for Venice between 1503 and 1509. His wife, Cassandra Solieri, and two daughters stayed behind in Carpi.

=== Artistic career ===
There is no evidence that Ugo received any formal training. He was most likely self-taught or possibly taught by local painters. His first work as a carver was in 1502, when he signed a contract with the Modenese typographers Benedetto Dolcibelli and Niccolo Bissoli to carve characters and punches. In 1503, records refer to "Ugo's pupils" and reference him as a "maestro" for the first time, indicating he may have started a workshop. There is also evidence that before Ugo left Carpi he may have been commissioned to complete some paintings, since he hired Saccacino as a "painting assistant." Carpi went through a period of cultural and urban development in the late 1400s and early 1500s. Although there are no records of Ugo's involvement, scholars believe he may have helped in the production of some pieces during this time.

Ugo lived in Venice from 1509 to 1517, mostly working as a blockcutter for woodcut book illustrations. Venice was a leading publishing centre, particularly the printing of illustrated books. In 1511, a number of woodcut book illustrations bearing the signature “Ugo” were published in Venice. In July 1516, Ugo requested a patent from the Venetian senate for what he claimed to be his unique chiaroscuro technique. In his request he described the process as a "new manner of printing light and dark." He requested the copyright for an undefined period of time, and for all designs and woodcuts he had made and would make. Although Ugo was an early Italian practitioner of chiaroscuro, there is evidence that this method had been previously used by German and Venetian printers.

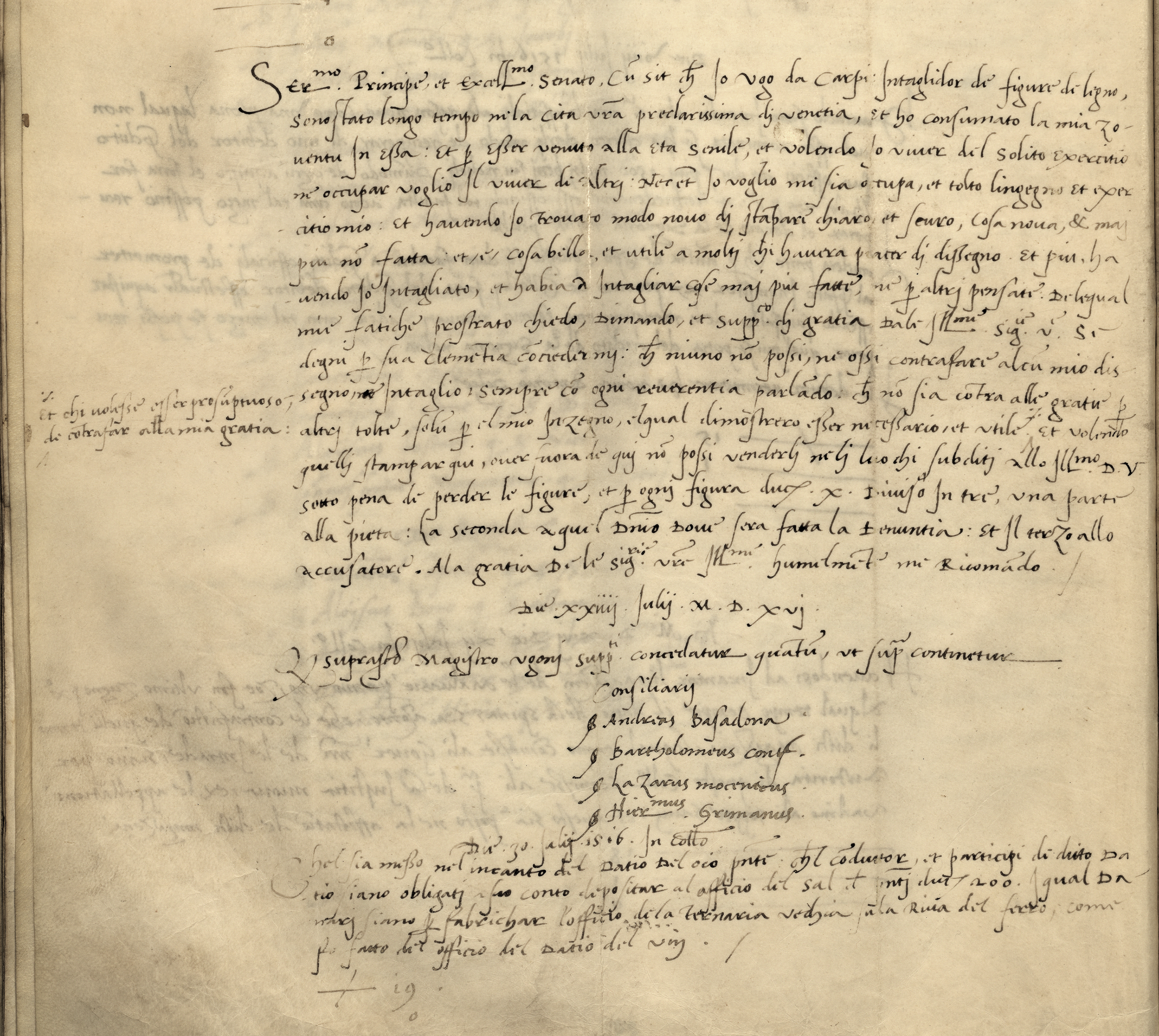
Ugo Da Carpi's request for a patent for the chiaoscuro technique, 1516

Ugo moved to Rome in 1517. There was a large printmaking circle in Rome and high demand for prints of Raphael’s work. There was a circle of engravers working around Raphael, whose prints were issued by a professional publisher, il Baviera, Raphael's former assistant, who had gained control of his plates at his death. Due to il Baviera's tight control on the original copper plates used to print Raphael's engravings, creating pirated copies of Raphael's work became a common activity amongst engravers and printers in Rome. Ugo settled in Rome near Raphael's studio, but he worked independently of il Baviera.

He set up a workshop in his house and printed and published blocks in his own shop. In 1518, he received a copyright from Pope Leo X for his four-block print The Death of the Ananias. This work, along with many more of Ugo's chiaroscuro works from this time period, are considered by scholars to be the best examples of "truly reproductive prints." Although Ugo was focused on reproducing and replicating sketches, engravings, and prints by other artists while in Rome, he began to develop his own unique style. An early example of this is present in Ugo's replications of Raphael's sketches, where he chose colours for his prints dissimilar to the ones used by Raphael.

In 1527 the sack of Rome forced Ugo to flee to Bologna. It is believed he may have run a workshop in Bologna due to the existence of numerous prints that are technically and stylistically similar to Ugo's work, yet also have some notable differences. He is known to have worked with the famous carvers Antonio da Trento, Arrighi and Eustachio Celebrino. Ugo also produced a writing-book while in Bologna. Writing books were common in Italy in the 16th and 17th centuries and contained pages of letters printed using woodcuts. These books were manuals and attempted to teach others how to write in a similar way to Renaissance humanist manuscripts.

=== Death ===
There remains no consensus about the date of Ugo da Carpi's death. Some scholars cite his year of death as 1523, since that year he was described as “fu Ugone” in a testimony by his daughter. However, a few months later, a different document claimed Ugo was alive, indicating his family may have mistakenly thought he was dead. In January 1532, Ugo was referenced in attendee records from his daughter’s baptism, but in October of that year he was again described as deceased.

== Works ==
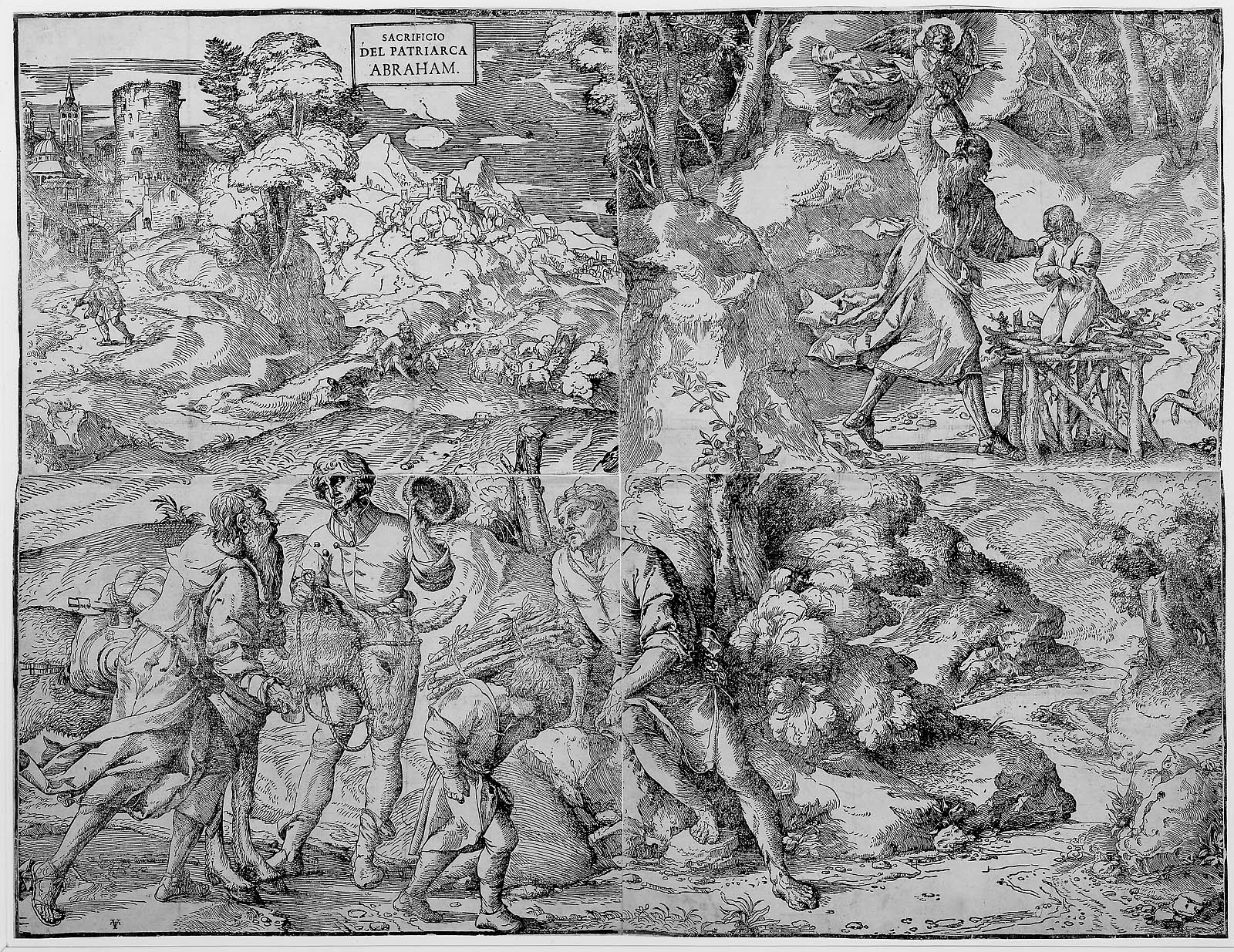
Sacrifice of Abraham, c. 1515. Conventional woodcut, on four blocks, over a metre in each dimension.

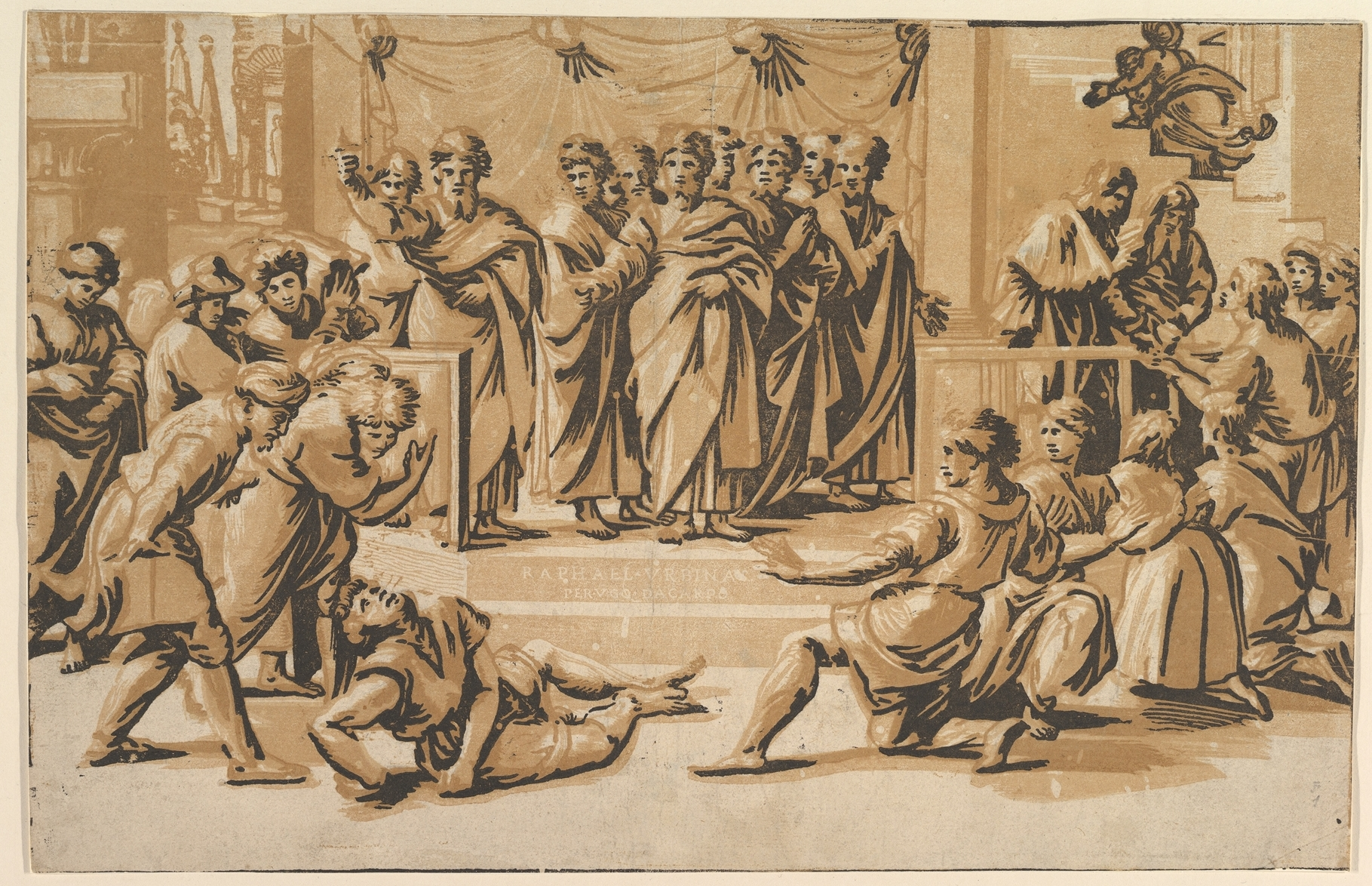
The Death of Ananias, aftyer one of the Raphael Cartoons.

One of Ugo's important early commissions, about 1515, was the Sacrifice of Abraham from the Venetian publisher Bernardino Benalius. It was a large black and white print on four joined sheets. As framed, it measures 110.5 x 138.4 x 1.9 cm (43 1/2 x 54 1/2 x 3/4 in.). It is thought to be one of only a few prints designed by Ugo himself, and contains stylistic elements borrowed from Dürer and Titian. It was following this first commission that he requested a patent for his technique.

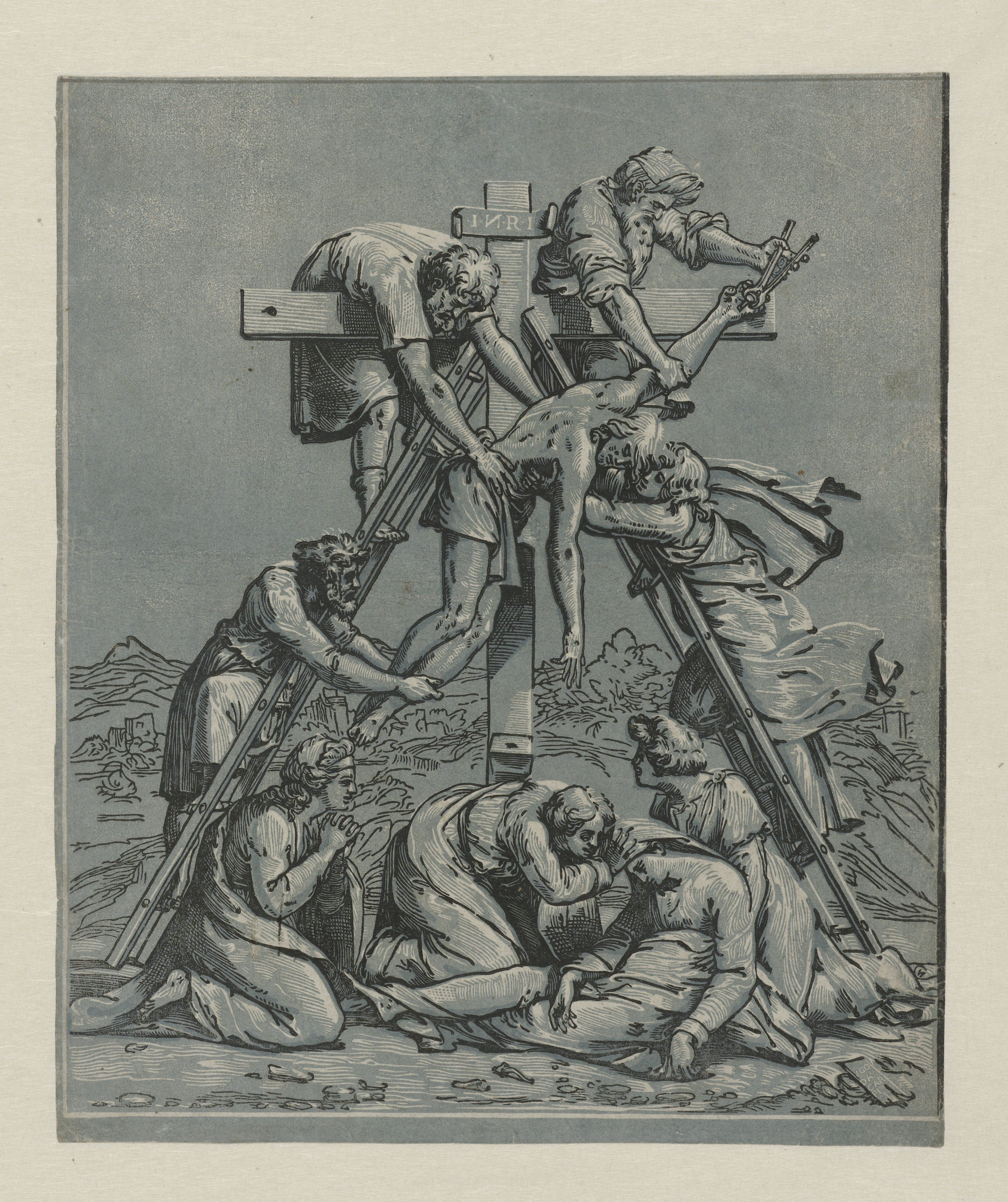
Descent From the Cross, after Raphael, with line block and two tone blocks

Over the years Ugo reproduced designs by numerous artists, including Raphael, Baldassare Peruzzi, and Parmigianino. According to Vasari, Ugo da Carpi even taught the print-making process to Parmigianino. The majority of Ugo's carvings are copies or reproductions of other works. Although Ugo's works are interpretations and not exact copies, it is unlikely that Ugo invented the design for many of his woodcuts. In all surviving prints and inscriptions, Ugo has signed the work as "the cutter" or "the printer," speaking to his focus on copying other works. However, this was not uncommon, since replicating other artistis' work was the focus of the engraving and printing communities at this time.

Ugo's prints were probably often used as wall decorations, serving as inexpensive substitutes for paintings. This is suggested by the variety of their sizes and the fact that they were printed on thick paper designed to sustain heavy wear. Despite this, few prints have survived in good condition.

=== Diogenes ===
It is believed that Ugo carved Diogenes in Bologna between 1527 and 1530. The initial design for this print came from Parmigianino, who Vasari incorrectly reported also created the woodcut. Caraglio, who often created engravings for Parmigianino, produced an engraving based on his sketch. Although the majority of scholars agree that Ugo's woodcut was based on Caraglio's engraving, some experts, such as David Laundau, believe that Ugo worked directly with Parmigianino to produce his woodcut. There are three reasons scholars believe this is a possibility. First, Caraglio's engraving (287 mm x 218 mm) is significantly smaller than Ugo's woodcut (490 mm x 354 mm). Most copies in Rome at this time were almost identical in size, and Ugo's woodcuts always corresponded in size to the models. Therefore, Ugo may have copied this image from a sketch closer in size to his final work. Additionally, whenever Ugo's models can be identified, he never omits, adds or changes important details, as he does in Diogenes. This also makes it more likely that Ugo was working more closely with Parmigianino than often believed. Finally, as Landau describes it "There is no precedent for Ugo making what can only be called a powerful image from so weak a model. This is Ugo's masterpiece and he must have had Parmigianino's hand very close to his woodblock when he produced it."

When comparing Caraglio's engraving and Ugo's woodcut, there are notable differences in both content and style. Caraglio's engraving includes additional details, such as landscape elements and a lantern. Ugo substantially reduced these details, keeping the barrel, the fowl, the book, the movement and the swirling cloth. Parmigianino scholar Florence Kossof notes: "He has reduced and simplified Caraglio's wealth of detail but has managed to increase the sense of vigor and energy."

Diogenes was highly renowned in Renaissance Italy. In Lives of the Artist, Vasari praises it as a “most beautiful print.” The print consists of a sophisticated four block design and intricate carving. In the print, the design is built up through areas of colour instead of detailed line work, making it look more like a painting than a print.

=== David Slaying Goliath ===
This woodcut is thought to have been carved around 1552 and is based on a design by Raphael. Marcantonio Raimondi also created an engraving based on this print. It is unclear if the woodcut is based on the engraving, the engraving is based on the woodcut, or if they are both based on a sketch by Raphael. This engraving is notable because Ugo reversed the composition of the initial painting, which speaks to his interpretive skills as a carver. He used four blocks to create this print.

=== Raphael and His Mistress or Penelope and Odysseus ===
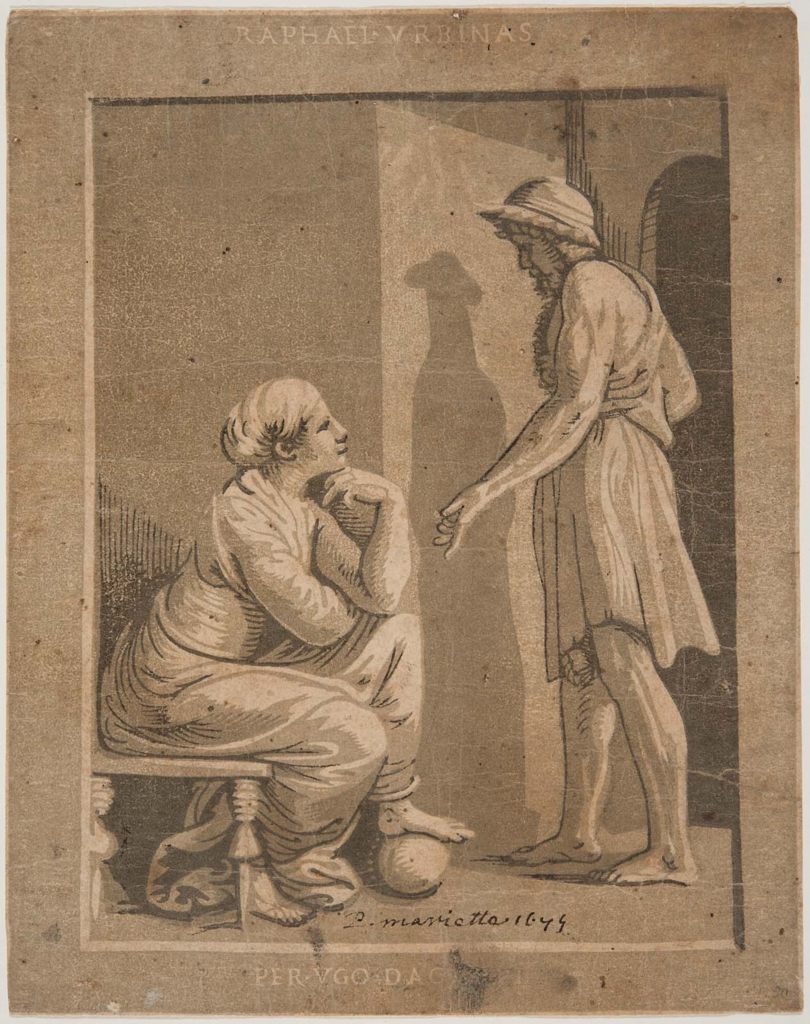
Raphael and His Mistress or Penelope and Odysseus

Ugo collaborated directly with Raphael to create this print. It is one of Ugo's smaller prints, at only 181 mm by 144 mm. Given its small size and intimate subject detail, this print has been the subject of much study and speculation, with some scholars considering it to be one of Ugo's most daring and original works. The quiet and intimate setting is reminiscent of Raphael's drawings of Mother and Child, and the title of Raphael and his Mistress given by Bartsch likely arose from Ugo's access to Raphael's workshop. More recently, however, Peter Parshall has proposed that the woodcut represents the scene from The Odyssey in which Odysseus is finally reunited with his wife Penelope. In this context, the ball on which the seated female figure rests her foot has been identified as the ball of yarn that represented Penelope's fidelity and cunning, while the depiction of Odysseus can be compared with his description in The Odyssey as lit by the light of a fire and silhouetted against a wall.

=== Saint Veronica Altarpiece ===
The Saint Veronica Altarpiece is the only painting known to be Ugo's work. It is thought to have been finished between 1524 and 1527, and was originally located in Saint Peter's Basilica in Rome. The painting was placed on an altar directly below the chamber that housed the Veil of Veronica, one of the most important relics in Saint Peter's. The Veil of Veronica is one of the most famous achierpoita, or Christian relics which bear a likeness of Christ not made by human hand. According to the Bible of Argenteuil, this acheiropoetos was produced when Veronica wiped the sweat and blood from Christ's face with a linen cloth and Christ's face left an imprint on this cloth. It is still debated among scholars why Ugo, who was not a well-known or especially talented painter, was chosen to create the altar painting for such a famous relic.

The painting itself was likely based on a sketch produced by Parmigianino. Vasari reported that Ugo painted this work using his hands, due to the fact that Ugo signed the painting: ‘Per Vgo / da Carpi Intaiatore / fata senza / penello" or "Ugo da Carpi, woodcut engraver, made without the brush." Ugo's signature is misleading, as he did use brushes to produce the altarpiece, but also has an interesting double meaning. The vera icon was considered an acheiropoetos, an image ‘made without human hands.’ Ugo's signature ‘made without the brush’ plays on the creation and understanding of the relic itself. The signature is also a deliberate nod to his identity as a carver. Up until this point, he hadn’t worked with a brush, but with his hands. Although Ugo used brushes in the painting's production, the altarpiece also has fingernail and finger marks. Scholars speculate that due to Ugo's lack of painting experience he used his fingers and fingernails to fix mistakes.

== Style ==
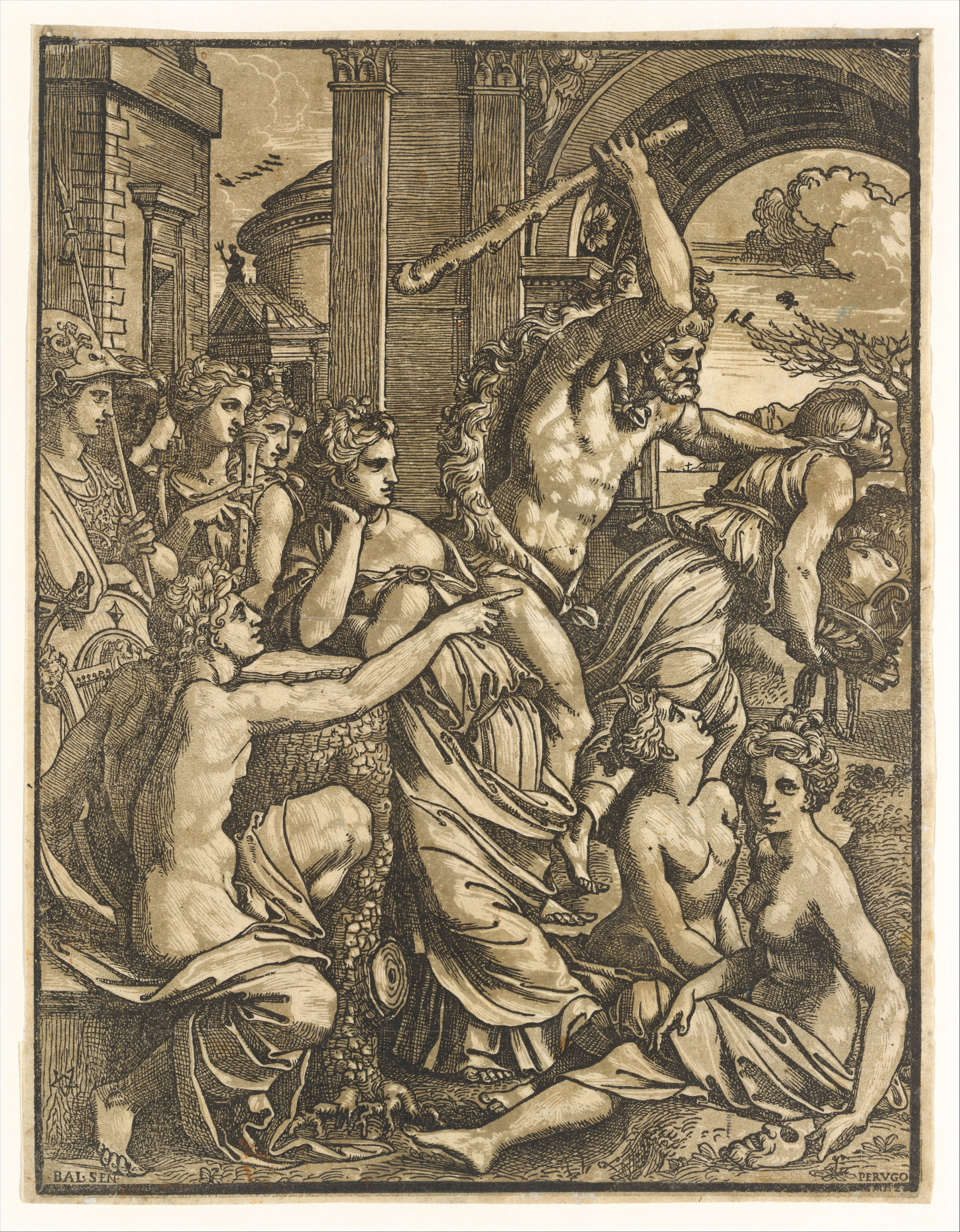
Hercules chasing Avarice from the Temple of the Muses, after Peruzzi

In the chiaroscuro technique, multiple blocks were cut and inked with different colours so the resulting print resembles a pen-and-ink sketch. The paper served as the middle tone, and then highlights (chiara) were added with white gouache, and darkness (scuro) and shadow was created by adding crosshatching in pen or a dark wash with a brush. Woodcuts would consist of a key, or line block, which consisted of the contours and crosshatching and a varying number of tone blocks. The key block sometimes stood alone as a black and white print. The more blocks, the more tones the final product contained, and the more complex the printing and carving process became.

Ugo quickly progressed from the basic two block print to working with three blocks. In three different prints of Hercules over the course of 1515, his development is evident. He uses increasingly flexible lines and more complex and nuanced shading. The Massacre of the Innocents was his first work that contained 4 different blocks and he utilized between 3 and 5 blocks for the rest of his prints. Ugo didn't rely on the key blocks to define his prints' composition. Instead, Ugo built his images using multiple blocks with different variations on one tone.

Ugo's own printings of his woodcuts use a distinctive palette of soft blues and greens. Ugo utilized translucent inks in similar colours, which created nuanced and fluid transitions between one block and the next. Ugo's striking Diogenes carving was printed in green and gold.

One of the most distinctive features of Ugo’s carvings, and why he is much better known than other carvers of this time, is that he signed his work. Ugo’s signature is often cleverly incorporated into his prints, as can be seen in the Diogenes print. Diogenes grips a stick in his right hand, directing the viewers’ attention to an open book where the names of both the designer and the printmaker are inscribed. His signatures often acknowledge his identity as an engraver, a printer or a copier.

== List of Works ==
- Sybil Reading, Facing Right. Chiaroscuro woodcut from two blocks, 287 x 240 mm, Metropolitan Museum of Art, New York.
- Raphael and His Mistress. Chiaroscuro woodcut from three blocks, 181 x 144 mm, Metropolitan Museum of Art, New York.
- Three Marys Lamenting the Dead Christ. Woodcut, 218 x 172 mm. British Museum, London.
- Hercules Chasing Avarice from the Temple of the Muses. Chiaroscuro woodcut from two blocks (first version), 312 x 237 mm. Albertina, Vienna.
- Hercules Chasing Avarice from the Temple of the Muses. Chiaroscuro woodcut from two blocks (second version), 297 x 228 mm. British Museum, London.
- Diogenes. Chiaroscuro woodcut from four blocks, 490 x 354 mm, Albertina, Vienna.
- David Slaying Goliath. Chiaroscuro woodcut from three blocks, 265 x 392 mm, Minneapolis Institute of Art, Minneapolis.
- Saint Veronica Altarpiece. Tempera and charcoal on panel, 1580 × 1450 mm, Archivio della Fabbrica di San Pietro, Vatican.
