= Ibn al-'Amid =

Ibn al-ʿAmīd may refer to:

- two Buyid viziers, father and son:
  Abu'l-Fadl ibn al-Amid (died 970)
  Abu'l-Fath Ali ibn Muhammad ibn al-Amid (died 977)
- members of the Coptic Banū al-ʿAmīd family:
  Al-Makīn Jirjis ibn al-ʿAmīd the Elder (died 1273), historian
  Al-Makīn Jirjis ibn al-ʿAmīd the Younger (died after 1398), theologian
