= Antonio da Trento =

Italian printmaker (1508–1550)

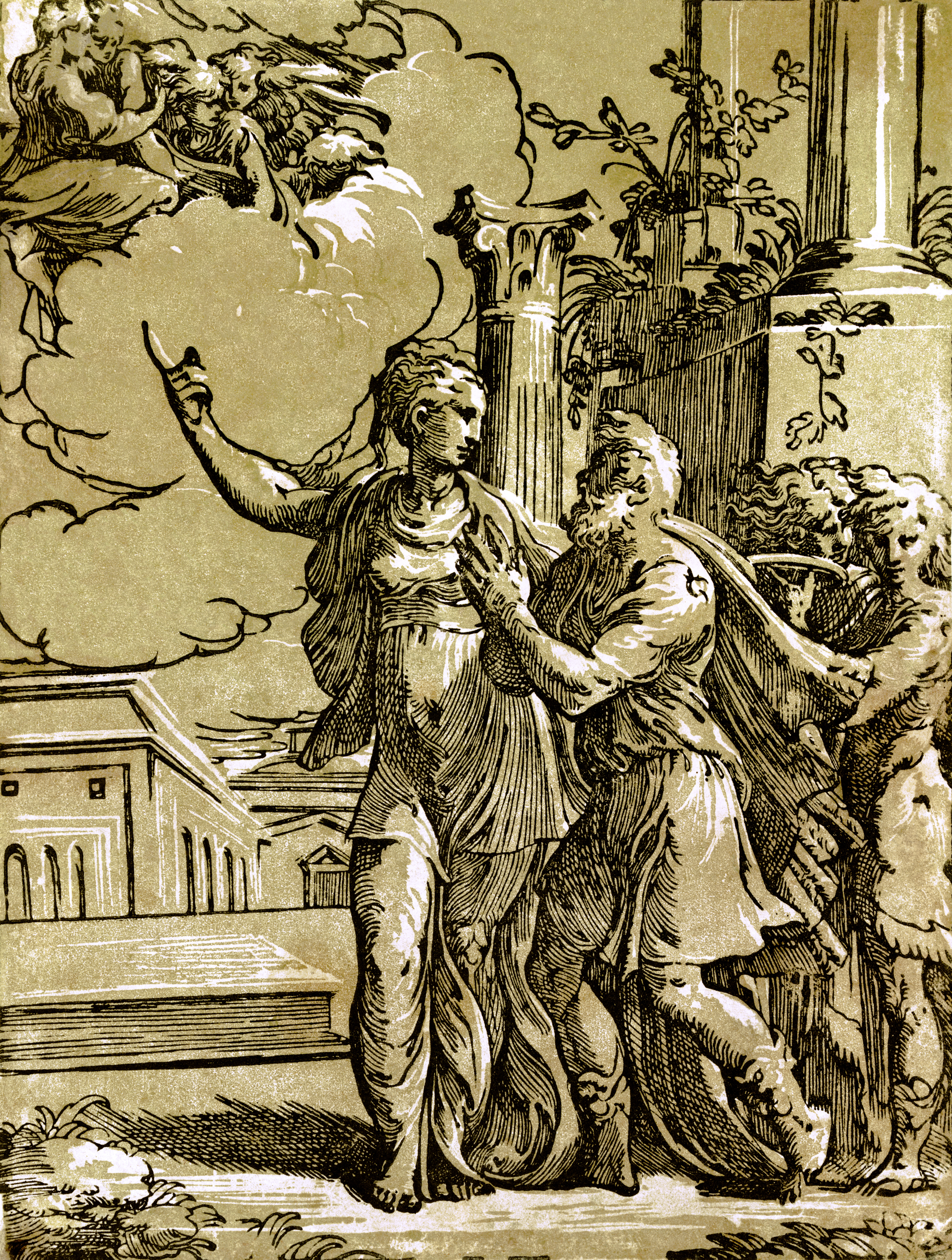
Antonio da Trento, Tiburtine Sibyl and the Emperor Augustus

Antonio da Trento (1508–1550) was an Italian printmaker, born in Trento. He specialized in chiaroscuro woodcuts, especially of religious subjects. Da Trento probably first learned wood engraving from Ugo da Carpi. He was later a disciple of Parmigianino, and afterwards within the School of Fontainebleau.

Da Trento's technique involved creating three separate blocks for each print. The first was for the outlines, the second for shadows, and the third was for the lighter tints. Three documented works of his are The Beheading of St. Peter and St. Paul, The Tiburtine Sibyl showing the Virgin Mary, with the Infant Christ, and Psyche Saluted by the People with the Honors of Divinity.
