= Al-Makīn Jirjis ibn al-ʿAmīd the Younger =

- جرجس المكين ابن العميد الأصغر
- Born: 14th century (exact date unknown); Fustat (Old Cairo), Mamluk Sultanate, Egypt
- Died: After 1398/1399
- Occupations: Priest; theologian; physician; civil servant
- Writing career
- Notable work: al-Ḥāwī (religious encyclopedia)

Al-Makīn Jirjis ibn al-ʿAmīd (fl. 1390s), called the Younger, was a Coptic priest, theologian, physician and civil servant in the Mamluk Sultanate.

== Life ==
Jirjis (George) was probably born in Old Cairo in the first half of the 14th century. He held a high position under the Mamluks, which he probably inherited. The title al-makīn means "the powerful" and had been held by an earlier member of the family, the historian Jirjis ibn al-ʿAmīd. The sobriquet "the Younger" serves to distinguish the two, who have often been confused by modern authors. Their family is called the Banū al-ʿAmīd ("sons of the ʿamīd"). Jirjis's brother, al-Asʿad Ibrāhīm, served as the secretary (kātib) of the Mamluk dīwān al-jaysh (army council).

Jirjis retired to live as a hermit in the monastery of Dayr al-Qusayr in the Ṭura south of Cairo. There he composed the work known as al-Ḥāwī. There existed an autograph copy dated 1398/1399. He died sometime after that.

== Works ==
Jirjis wrote in Arabic. His main work, commonly known as al-Ḥāwī, goes by several different titles and subtitles in the manuscripts. It is a religious encyclopedia. In a modern copy, it runs to about 800 pages. It consists of two parts. The first contains an introduction on Christology followed by five chapters and the second contains a further six chapters. Each chapter is subdivided into three sections. It contains extensive biblical exegesis, as well as Coptic apologetics against Judaism, Islam, the Melkites and the Dyophysites. It contains a refutation of astrology and the theory of taḥrīf, the corruption of the Christian Bible. He argues that Christianity has grace instead of a sharīʿa.

Towards the end of the 15th century, al-Ḥāwī was translated into Ethiopic under the title Tälmid. In the Ethiopic tradition, it is attributed to "George, disciple of Antony the Syrian".

== Bibliography ==
- Sidarus, Adel; Swanson, Mark N. (2013). "Al-Makīn Jirjis ibn al-ʿAmīd". In David Thomas; Alex Mallett (eds.). Christian–Muslim Relations: A Bibliographical History. Vol. 5 (1350–1500). Brill. pp. 254–261. doi:10.1163/1877-8054_cmri_COM_25697.
- Sidarus, Adel (2013). "Families of Coptic Dignitaries (buyūtāt) under the Ayyūbids and the Golden Age of Coptic Arabic Literature (13th cent.)" (PDF). Journal of Coptic Studies. 15: 189–208.
