= Amid Dictionary =

1963 book by Hasan Amid

- Author: Hasan Amid
- Language: Persian
- Published: 1963
- Pages: 1114

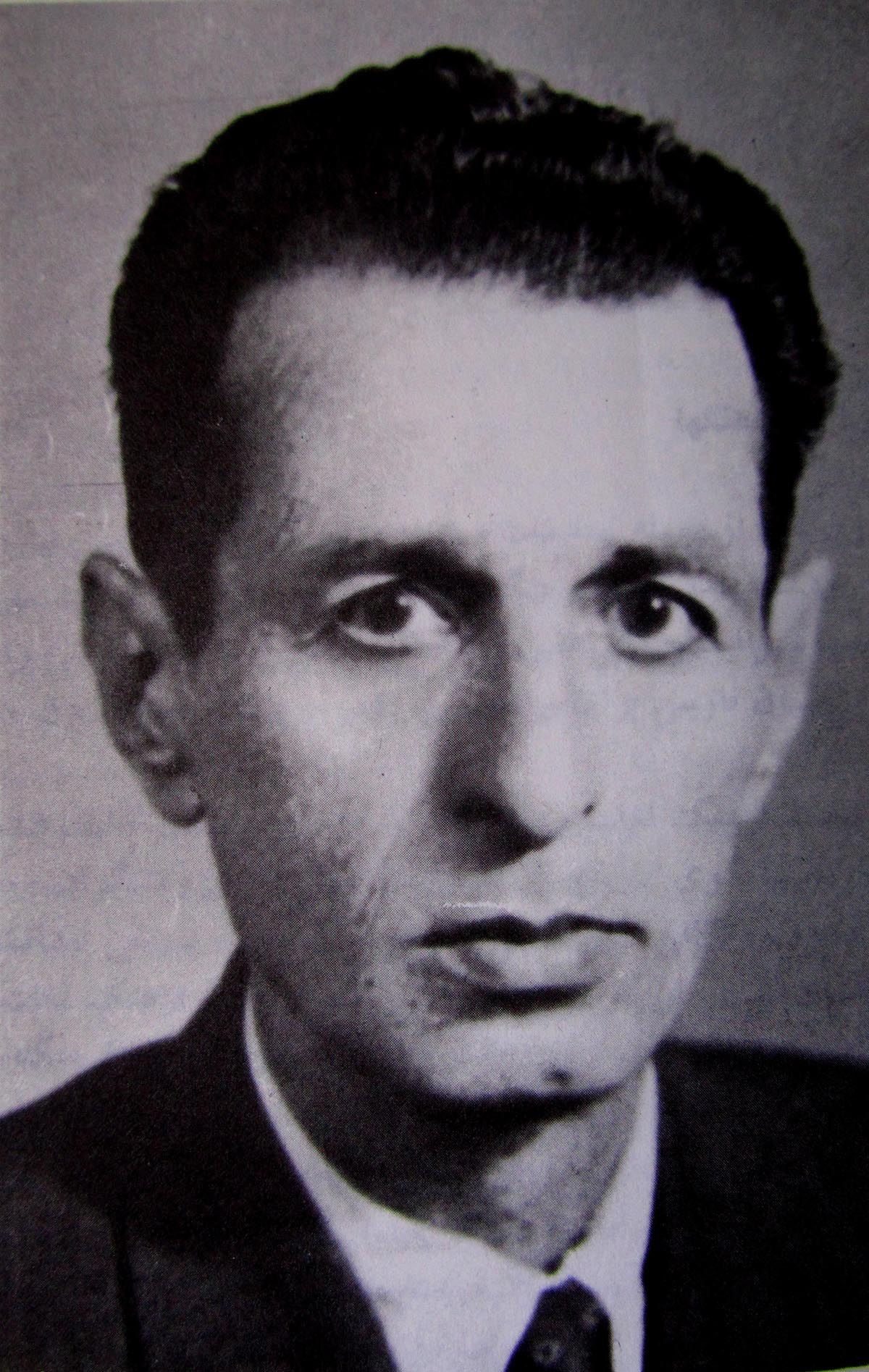
Hasan Amid, the author of Amid Dictionary

Amid Dictionary or Amid Persian Dictionary (Persian: فرهنگ فارسی عمید, known also as فرهنگ عمید) is a two volume dictionary of Persian language, written by Hasan Amid.

The dictionary was first published in 1963. Hasan Amid had previously published a dictionary titled Farhang-e No (lit. 'New Dictionary') in 1954, but the most complete version of the dictionary published by him is Amid Dictionary (1963). It was republished in 2010 under the supervision of Farhad Ghorbanzadeh, who was a researcher at Dehkhoda Dictionary Institute.
