= Apocalypse of Pseudo-Athanasius =

Coptic Orthodox sermon (715–744 CE)

The Apocalypse of Pseudo-Athanasius is an apocalyptic sermon authored between 715 and 744 during the Umayyad Caliphate. Very popular, the work was found in multiple Coptic manuscripts and in Arabic translations. The text most likely served as an influence for both Coptic and Copto-Arabic writings and is also a rare witness to the reaction of Copts towards the Muslim conquest of Egypt. Though Islamic practices of faith are absent from the text, it still provides the author's Coptic perspective to the fundamental historic changes in their country and the everyday-lives of the inhabitants.

== Narrative overview ==
The sermon is addressed to the monks and clergy of Egypt concerning the Copts' current condition under Muslim rule. The author elaborates that punishments are being sent on the world from God because of the sins committed by the monks and priests; they mislead the people with evil words and deeds. Except for the miaphysite Coptic Church, the correct faith was denied by all the other churches after the conclusion of the Council of Chalcedon. Only the Coptic Church would prevail.

== MS New York, Morgan Library & Museum – M 602 ==
Written in Coptic and dated to the ninth century, MS New York, Morgan Library & Museum – M 602 is the oldest and most complete manuscript. The Apocalypse consists of fifty-one pages of fols 51v-76v; Muslims and their rule over Egypt are only present in 68v-73v. Additionally, there are two passages but were inserted later pertaining to Michael. Despite the damage of the codex which has created many intervals, the manuscript serves as the basis for all editions.

== Authorship ==
Though the text is attributed to Athanasius of Alexandria, the actual author is unknown. The author can only be identified as a Coptic monk living in an Egyptian monastery in the first half of the eighth century based on the only available evidence, the text itself. The author is knowledgeable in the Coptic Church's ecclesiastical canons, biblical texts, and by the Coptic hagiographical works about the Church Fathers, the historical Athanasius. Accusing adversaries of heresy within their own church and fighting against all other denominations, the author fought for the Coptic miaphysite creed. The text evidently proves that apocalyptic expectations still existed in Egyptian society in the eighth century.

== Eschatology ==
Alluding much to biblical texts and using apocalyptic eschatology, the author interprets the direction of history; and similarly corresponding with the four beast of the apocalypse from Daniel 7:1-27, the four succession empires in the text. The first beast, the Roman Empire; the second beast, the Byzantine Empire; and after the Coptic Church who are the only remaining faithful, God punishes the non-faithful by the Persians who are the third beast. God ends Persian rule though after they transgressed the Law and immeasurable impiety is promulgated from them. God gives power to the Arabs who are the fourth beast, and the Coptic people continue to accept the evil committed by the monks and priests. Therefore, God sends war, pestilence, and natural disasters on Egypt then the world. The dominion of the Antichrist is announced and the Last Judgment after.

== Bibliography ==
- Matheou, Nicholas S.M.; Kampianaki, Theofili; Bondioli, Lorenzo M. (2016). From Constantinople to the Frontier: The City and the Cities. BRILL. ISBN 9789004307742.
- Thomas, David Richard; Roggema, Barbara; Sala, Juan Pedro Monferrer (2009). Christian-Muslim Relations: A Bibliographical History (600-900). BRILL. ISBN 9789004169753.
