= Arabic–Old French glossary =

Two pages of the glossary: French in Coptic script on the left and Arabic on the right

An Arabic–Old French glossary (or phrase book) occupies the final thirteen pages of the 16th-century manuscript Paris, Bibliothèque nationale de France, Copte 43, where it functions as an appendix to an Arabic treatise on Coptic lexicography entitled al-Sullam al-ḥāwī ('the comprehensive ladder'). The manuscript is a later copy. The glossary itself was probably compiled in the 13th century for Copts travelling in Outremer, where French was widely spoken. The manuscript contains two dates, 1296 and 1310, but the glossary was probably compiled before the fall of Acre in 1291, since it refers to that city and to the Latin Patriarch of Jerusalem.

The glossary contains a list of Old French words and phrases written in Coptic script with their Arabic equivalents in Arabic script. There are 228 lemmata. The great majority are single words. There are only a few sentences. Coptic was probably chosen to represent the French because, unlike Arabic, it has characters for vowels. Only 27 of 31 Coptic letters are actually used, but this is more than the 22 Latin letters typically used for Old French.

The format of the glossary is the same as that of the preceding Sullam al-ḥāwī. The Coptic text, written left to right, is on the left and the right-to-left Arabic is on the right. This indicates that French was the source language and Arabic the target. The words and phrases are arranged thematically, the themes being religion, numerals, days of the week, occupations, metals, everyday phrases, fruits, animals, navigation, weather, musical instruments, weapons, celestial bodies and cardinal directions. Some of the Old French terms are derived from Arabic and in the glossary translated back into Arabic.

The Copto-French orthography is based on the pronunciation of the Bohairic (north Egyptian) dialect of Coptic. According to Aslanov the French is a koiné specific to the Levant. It is most closely related to Walloon and in one case (ⲗⲱⲥⲑ, lōsth, 'the east') contains a Flemish loanward. There is evidence of codeswitching with Italian in a few phrases, and one sentence is entirely Italian: ⲥⲑⲁⲛⲡⲁϣ, stanpaš = stai in pace, 'be quiet'. There is also a set of words written in Coptic script in an unidentified language. Their Arabic translations are the names of numbers, but the source words are not from French.

The glossary is evidence that some Copts learned French in Acre. It has often been overlooked in crusader studies. Jacques-Joseph Champollion-Figeac published the Coptic text with transcription and modern French translation in 1829. The full text was edited and published by first Gaston Maspero in 1888 and subsequently by Cyril Aslanov in a 2006 monograph with commentary.

== Bibliography ==
- Aslanov, Cyril (2000). "Interpreting the Language-mixing in Terms of Codeswitching: The Case of the Franco-Italian Interface in the Middle Ages". Journal of Pragmatics. 32 (9): 1273–1281. doi:10.1016/S0378-2166(99)00100-9.
- Aslanov, Cyril (2002). "Languages in Contact in the Latin East: Acre and Cyprus". Crusades. 1: 155–181. doi:10.1080/28327861.2002.12220537.
- Aslanov, Cyril (2006). Evidence of Francophony in Mediaeval Levant: Decipherment and Interpretation (MS. Paris BnF Copte 43). Hebrew University Magnes Press.
- Aslanov, Cyril (2012). "Crusaders' Old French". In D. L. Arteaga (ed.). Research on Old French: The State of the Art. Studies in Natural Language and Linguistic Theory. Vol. 88. Springer. pp. 207–220. doi:10.1007/978-94-007-4768-5_11. ISBN 978-94-007-4767-8.
- Champollion-Figeac, Jacques-Joseph (1829). Charte de Commune en langue romane, pour la ville de Gréalou en Quercy; publiée avec sa traduction française et des recherches sur quelques points de l'histoire de la langue romane en Europe et dans le Levant. Firmin Didot.
- Kedar, Benjamin Z. (2006) [1998]. "Latins and Oriental Christians in the Frankish Levant, 1099–1291". Franks, Muslims and Oriental Christians in the Latin Levant: Studies in Frontier Acculturation. Variorum. pp. 209–222.
- Maspero, Gaston (1888). "Le vocabulaire français d'un Copte du XIII^{e} siècle". Romania. 17 (68): 481–512. doi:10.3406/roma.1888.6028.
- Minervini, Laura (2010). "Le français dans l'Orient latin (XIII^{e}–XIV^{e} siècles): Éléments pour la caractérisation d'une scripta du Levant". Revue de linguistique romane. 74 (293–294): 119–198. doi:10.5169/seals-781695.
- Rubin, Jonathan (2018). Learning in a Crusader City: Intellectual Activity and Intercultural Exchanges in Acre, 1191–1291. Cambridge University Press.
