= Arabic Sibylline prophecy =

Set of Christian apocalyptic texts

Start of a 16th-century Garshuni copy on paper

The Arabic Sibylline prophecy is a set of Christian apocalyptic texts based on the tradition of the Tiburtine Sibyl. The original version of the prophecy was probably composed in the late 8th century by Melkites in ʿAbbāsid Syria. It is an example of vaticinia ex eventu (prophecies after the fact) and was composed "to give encouragement and hope to Christians living under Islamic rule, especially during periods of political instability." The prophecy is possibly the oldest apocalyptic text composed in Arabic.

== Recensions and manuscripts ==
There are five recensions of the prophecy that fall into three groups. The first or "primitive" group is represented by the recension known as Arab I. It is of Melkite origin. The later "post-Hārūn" group contains recensions Arab II, Arab III and Arab IV. The third group, recension Arab V, is of Coptic origin. The Copto-Arabic version was also epitomized and incorporated into chapter 70 of the Majmūʿ usūl al-dīn of al-Muʾtaman ibn al-ʿAssāl.

The oldest manuscript of the Arabic Sibylline prophecy is fragmentary: a single folio from Sinai, Monastery of Saint Catherine, MS Ar. 461, dating to the 9th or 10th century. Another manuscript from Sinai (Ar. NF pap. 34) is dated to 1002. All other manuscripts date to the 15th century or later. There are copies of the prophecy written in Garshuni, that is, Arabic in the Syriac script.

Nothing is known about the author or redactors of the prophecy save what can be gleaned from the texts themselves and the manuscript history. The Arabic prophecy belongs to the same Sibylline tradition as the Greek Oracle of Baalbek and the Latin Sibylla Tiburtina, but it is not directly related to those texts. The Ethiopic version of the Sibylline prophecy is based on a Melkite recension of the Arabic prophecy.

== Synopsis ==
=== Primitive version ===
In common with the Graeco-Latin tradition, the Arabic Sibylline prophecy recounts how the Sibyl, a pagan prophetess, interprets a vision of nine suns dreamt at the same time by one hundred sages of Rome. The suns are said to represent the progressive ages of human history. The eighth age covers recent history and the ninth the end times. It is in their description of the eighth age that the different versions take on distinctiveness.

All versions of the prophecy refer to Christ elliptically as "he who was hung upon the cross". In the primitive recension, Muḥammad is not named, but the Arabs are referred to as "a people that comes out from the mountains" who will reign over "the kings of the Byzantines [and] the Copts" for a generation.

=== Subsequent redactions ===
The primitive version was updated following the death of the Caliph Hārūn al-Rashīd in 809. The recensions Arab II, III and IV refer to Muḥammad as "a man from the south" and give his name in the form of a numerical code (40-8-40-4). His appearance ushers in the eighth age. There are clear references to the reign of Hārūn and to the crisis and disorder that followed his death. Arab III and Arab IV are historically important as the only texts from the ʿAbbāsid caliphate that refer to ʿAbbāsid–Frankish diplomacy. Arab III was probably written in 811–813, while the Frankish emperor Charlemagne was still alive.

The Copto-Arabic version was composed in the late 11th century in Egypt. It updates the prophecy with references to events from the reign of the Fātimid Caliph al-Mustanṣir (r. 1035–1094). The last datable event it refers to is the victory of Badr al-Jamālī over the invasion of Egypt by Atsız bin Uvak in 1077. It does not refer to the caliph's death and so was probably written before 1094.

== Bibliography ==
- Ebied, Rifaat Y.; Young, Michael J. L. (1976). "A Newly-Discovered Version of the Arabic Sibylline Prophecy". Oriens Christianus. 60: 83–94.
- Ebied, Rifaat Y.; Young, Michael J. L. (1977). "An Unrecorded Arabic Version of a Sibylline Prophecy". Orientalia Christiana Periodica. 43 (2): 297–307.
- Graf, Georg (1944). Geschichte der Christlichen Arabischen Literatur. Vol. 1. Biblioteca Apostolica Vaticana.
- Ottewill-Soulsby, Samuel (2019). "ʿAbbāsid–Carolingian Diplomacy in Early Medieval Arabic Apocalypse". Millennium. 16 (1): 213–231. doi:10.1515/mill-2019-0011. S2CID 207892673.
- Swanson, Mark N. (2009). "The Arabic Sibylline Prophecy". In David Thomas; Barbara Roggema (eds.). Christian-Muslim Relations: A Bibliographical History. Vol. 1. Brill. pp. 492–497.
- van Lent, Jos (2011). "The Copto-Arabic Sibylline Prophecy". In David Thomas; Alex Mallett (eds.). Christian-Muslim Relations: A Bibliographical History. Vol. 3 (1050–1200). Brill. pp. 270–273.
