= Apocalypse of Shenute =

Short 7th-century Coptic text

The Apocalypse of Shenute is a short Coptic apocalyptic text which purports to be a prophecy of Shenute from Christ about the eschaton (last days). The Coptic Apocalypse of Elijah greatly influenced the text. It is the oldest miaphysite Coptic apocalypse to survive from the Islamic period, a rare contemporary witness to Coptic–Muslim relations in the earliest period, one of the earliest miaphysite Coptic sources to mention the Islamic rejection of the crucifixion of Christ, and a response to the Islamic conversion of Copts.

== Textual impression ==
The stigmatization of Muslims being evil and to deny their religious claims is the purpose of the text as the text implies it was counter-written to Islamic conversion, stating the world will be deceived by the Muslim rulers who are implicitly compared with the Antichrist; claiming to be Christ, then later revealing himself to be the actual oppressor. The antichrist's imminent reign is signaled by Muslim rule and their confiscation of property, harassments, and apostasy of Christians. Simultaneously though, those who imitate the "pure ones" by resisting the terror and temptations of the deceiver, will receive God's eternal reward: the text implies believers not abandon their faith but resist present trials.

== Manuscripts ==
The Apocalypse of Shenute is preserved both in the Ethiopian and Arabic Life of Shenute and in Sahidic fragments. It was most likely composed in Coptic as the Arabic presents signs of it being translated from Coptic and likely authored in the White Monastery by a miaphysite Copt. The consensus is that the original was a Coptic Life of Shenute dated 685–695. The Ethiopian text relies on the Arabic yet still differs in textual content, and there is also the possibility of the text originally authored in Greek because of the text being dated at an early period. A critical English translation based on the Arabic was published in J. van Lent's Coptic apocalyptic writings from the Islamic period and a French translation from the Ethiopian in G. Colin's La version éthiopienne de la vie de Schenoudi.

== Date ==
The text is estimated to be authored in the 690s as the text most likely alluded to the Dome of the Rock and its starting-construction or completion in 691–692 from the passage that the Arabs will, "rebuild the Temple that is in Jerusalem", and the afflicted Egyptian society from refugee problems in the start of the new century are nonexistent. The text could possibly be authored not long after 693-94 of the tax reform by Governor Abd al-Azīz as recorded in Eutychius of Alexandria's Eutychii Annales (i, p. 41), along with the expanding political and religious assertiveness of Islam that possibly incited fear of a major apostasy outbreak.

== Bibliography ==
- Pratt, Douglas; Tieszen, Charles L. (2020). Christian-Muslim Relations. A Bibliographical History Volume 15 Thematic Essays (600-1600). BRILL. ISBN 9789004423701.
- Shoemaker, Stephen J. (2021). A Prophet Has Appeared: The Rise of Islam Through Christian and Jewish Eyes. University of California Press. ISBN 9780520299610.
- Thomas, David Richard; Roggema, Barbara; Sala, Juan Pedro Monferrer (2009). Christian-Muslim Relations: A Bibliographical History (600-900). BRILL. ISBN 9789004169753.
