= Hasan Amid =

Iranian lexicographer (1910–1979)

Hasan Amid حسن عمید
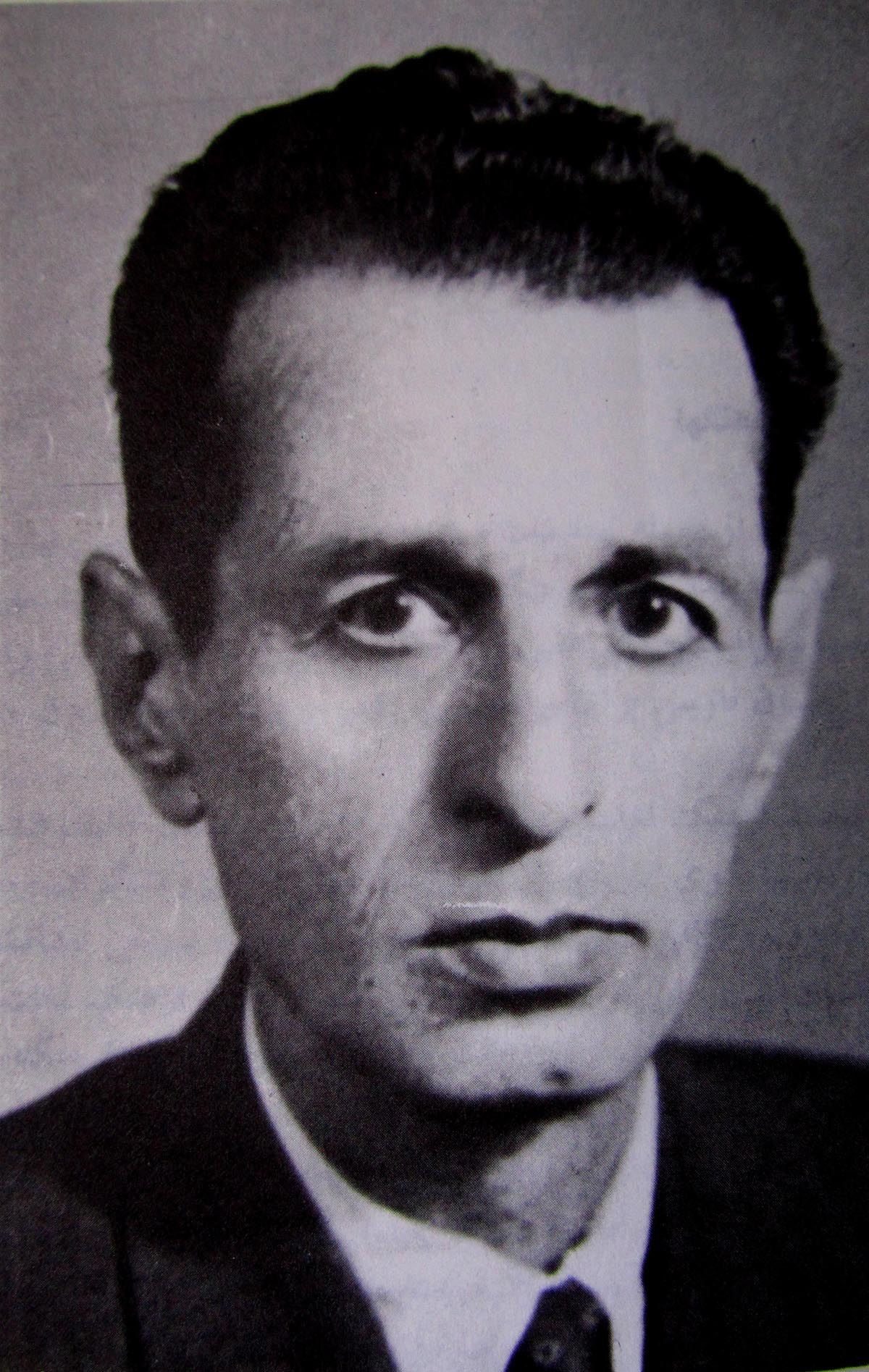
- Hasan Amid
- Born: 1910; Mashhad, Iran
- Died: 10 September 1979 (aged 69); Tehran, Iran
- Occupations: Lexicographer, writer, journalist
- Writing career
- Notable work: Amid Dictionary

Hasan Amid (Persian: حسن عمید; 1910–1979) was an Iranian lexicographer, writer, and journalist.

== Life and activities ==
Hasan Amid was born in 1910 in Mashhad, Khorasan province of Iran. He completed his education in Mashhad, and became a member of Anjoman-e Adabi ("the Literary Community"). He started his career in journalism, writing, and lexicography in those years. Among his most important activities in Mashhad was being editor-in-chief of Khorasan yearbook and Tus newspaper.

During the Anglo-Soviet invasion of Iran, when the Soviet forces captured Mashhad, Amid was exiled to Tehran.

Hasan Amid spent decades of his life on research centering on dictionaries and lexicography. He wrote multiple Persian dictionaries in these years, the most notable being Amid dictionary (Wāźenāmeye Amid, Farrhang-e Amid). He died on 10 September 1979.

== Works ==
- Amid, Hasan (1963). Farhang-i Farsi 'Amid (Persian Dictionary). ISBN 978-9-648-21627-1. Amid dictionary
- Farhang-e No (1929)
- Farhang-e Koochak-e Amid
- Farhang-e Mofasal-e Amid
- Farhang-e Bargozide-ye Amid
- Farhang-e Jibi-ye Amid
- Farhang-e Dabirestani-ye Amid
- Farhang-e Tarikh va Joghrafia-ye Amid
- Gross Errors in Persian Dictionaries
- Nikookaran (1936)
- Khorasan Yearbook
- On the Ruins of Persepolis (1931)
- Magnetism Mysteries
- Tebb-e Jadid
- Amid, Hasan (2008). Hasan Amid: Einsprachiges Wörterbuch Persisch. p. 1309. ISBN 978-9-640-00131-8.
