= ʿamīd =

ʿAmīd (plural ʿumadā, meaning "mainstay, support") was an Arabic title used in Greater Iran under the rule of the Samanids, Buyids, Ghaznavids and Seljukids. It was reserved for a high rank of civilian (as opposed to military) official. It was the highest civilian title under the Ghaznavids. The office of ʿāmil (governor, tax collector) was usually filled from the ranks of ʿumadā. Persons with the name Ibn al-ʿAmīd claimed descent from members of this class of officials.

The term ʿamīd was also used in compound titles. Under the Buyids, the forms ʿamīd al-dawla, ʿamīd al-dīn and ʿamīd al-juyūsh are attested. Under the Ghaznavids, the ṣāḥib al-barīd (head of the postal service) held the title ʿamīd al-mulk. This title was used as a laqab by the vizier al-Kundurī. The title ʿamīd declined in the 12th century and was not used after the fall of Baghdad to the Mongols in 1258.
