= Jirjis al-Makin Ibn al-'Amid =

Egyptian historian

Jirjis al-Makīn ibn al-ʿAmīd
- جرجس المكين ابن العميد
- Born: 1205; Cairo, Ayyubid Sultanate (Present-day Egypt)
- Died: 1273 (aged 67–68); Damascus, Mamluk Sultanate (Present-day Syria)
- Occupations: Historian; civil official
- Known for: Synthesizing Biblical, Classical, and Islamic sources into a universal chronicle widely used by later historians
- Style: Chronicle-style universal history compendium

Academic work
- Notable works: Kitāb al-Taʾrīkh (also known as al-Majmūʿ al-Mubārak)

Jirjis al-Makīn (Arabic: جرجس المكين; 1206–after 1280, maybe 1293), known by his nasab Ibn al-ʿAmīd (Arabic: ابن العميد), was a Coptic Christian historian who wrote in Arabic. His name is sometimes anglicised as George Elmacin (Latin: Georgius Elmacinus).

== Life ==
Several details about his ancestors and some biographical elements are provided in his own history. He is also mentioned in the biographical dictionary of Ibn al-Ṣuqāʿī (d. 1325) and in a polemical tract by Ibn al-Wāsiṭī (d. 1312). He was born in Cairo in Ayyubid Egypt on February 18, 1206. His full name in Arabic was Jirjis (George) ibn al-ʿAmīd Abī l-Yāsir ibn Abī l-Makārim ibn Abī l-Ṭayyib al-Makīn ("the Powerful One"). His great-grandfather was a merchant from Tikrit in Iraq who settled in Egypt.

He was a Coptic Christian, and held high office in the military (dīwān al-jaysh) in Damascus. Such a position carried risks. He was twice imprisoned, possibly because of links to the unrest in Syria at the time of the Mongol invasion; in one case for over a decade. While in prison, he began to write his chronicle.

He died in Damascus: the date given by his biographer Ibn al-Ṣuqāʿī is 1273, but this is likely to be a mistake for 1293 (respectively, 672 and 692 of the Hijri calendar: 7 and 9 are often confused in Arabic manuscripts).

== Works ==
He is the author of a world chronicle in two parts. It is traditionally known as al-Majmu` al-Mubarak (The blessed collection), but in fact its real title is simply Kitāb al-Taʾrīḫ (Book of History/Chronology). The first portion runs from Adam down to the 11th year of Heraclius and consists of a series of 166 numbered biographies, in some manuscripts ending with a list of the Patriarchs of the Church of Alexandria. The second half is devoted to Islamic history, from the time of Muḥammad to the accession of the Mamluk Sultan Baybars in 1260. This second half is mainly derived from al-Ṭabarī, as the author tells us, through Ibn Wāṣil.

The Kitāb al-Taʾrīḫ is essentially a learned compilation of earlier sources: the Bible first and foremost, the world chronology of Ibn al-Rahib, but also the works of the Melkite authors Ibn Biṭrīq (Eutychius of Alexandria) and Agapius (al-Manbiǧī), the Josippon, hermetic sources, and a mysterious Rūzbihān, who is credited with a history of pre-Islamic Persia. The book proved influential among different readerships: Eastern Christians, Muslim historians, and early modern Arabists. It is preserved in more than 40 manuscripts in different recensions. In particular, it was used by the 14-15th century Mamluk historians Ibn Khaldūn, al-Qalqashandī, and al-Maqrīzī.

The second half of the Kitāb al-Taʾrīḫ was published in Arabic with Latin translation in Leiden in 1625. It was chiefly the work of Thomas Erpenius, although it was completed and published posthumously by his disciple Golius. The Historia Saracenica, as Erpenius entitled it, was a breakthrough in European knowledge of Islamic history and it was soon translated into French by Pierre Vattier as L'Histoire mahométane (Paris, 1657). An abbreviated English translation was also made from the Latin by Samuel Purchas as early as 1626. The edition and translation by Erpenius was one of the first ever made of an Arabic text in early modern Europe and suffers accordingly from the lack of lexica. It has been only partially emended by a new Egyptian edition by ʿAlī Bakr Ḥasan (Cairo, 2010, unfortunately on the same two manuscripts that were used by Erpenius).

The work is still partly unedited. In 2023 Martino Diez published a critical edition with English translation of the first quarter, from Adam to the end of the Achaemenids, which is expected to be followed by a second volume from Alexander the Great to Heraclius. The last part, from the author's birth to the end of the work, was edited by Claude Cahen and translated into French by Anne-Marie Eddé and Françoise Micheau.

An Ethiopic translation of the whole work also exists. From the manuscript British Library, Oriental 814, E. Wallis Budge translated the chapter on Alexander the Great, which contains verbatim extracts from the old Arabic Hermetic work al-Isṭimākhīs.

Muffaḍḍal ibn Abī l-Faḍāʾil, who may have been the author's great-nephew, wrote a continuation of the chronicle to the death of al-Nāṣir Muḥammad ibn Qalāwūn in 1341. This appendix mainly covers secular history, with only limited references to events in the Coptic community. The continuation was apparently written for personal use and has been edited and translated in European languages: from the beginning to 1317 by Edgar Blochet, in French; from 1317 to the end by Samira Kortantamer, in German.
