= William H. Worrell =

William Hoyt Worrell (28 April 1879 – 3 December 1952) was Professor of Near Eastern Studies at the University of Michigan, specializing in Semitic studies and an authority on the Copts.

== Biography ==
Worrell was born in Toledo and attended the University of Michigan in Ann Arbor, graduating with an A.B. in 1903. He then pursued graduate studies in America and Europe, receiving a Ph.D. at the University of Strassburg in 1909. Between 1910 and 1924, he was at the Hartford Seminary Foundation, initially as an instructor in Oriental Languages and Hellenistic Greek and later as Professor and of Phonetics. He moved to the Middle East, where he studied several dialects of Arabic, and, in 1919, he was appointed director of the American School of Oriental Research in Jerusalem. Worrell returned to Michigan in 1925 and was chairman of the Department of Oriental Languages and. Literatures from 1944 until his retirement in 1948.

== Selected publications ==
- The Coptic Manuscripts in the Freer Collection (1923)
- The Proverbs of Solomon in Sahidic Coptic, according to the Chicago Manuscript (1931)
- A Study of Races in the Ancient Near East
- Coptic Sounds
- A Short Account of the Copts (1945)
- Coptic Texts in the University of Michigan Collection (1942).
