= Woodcut =

Relief printing technique

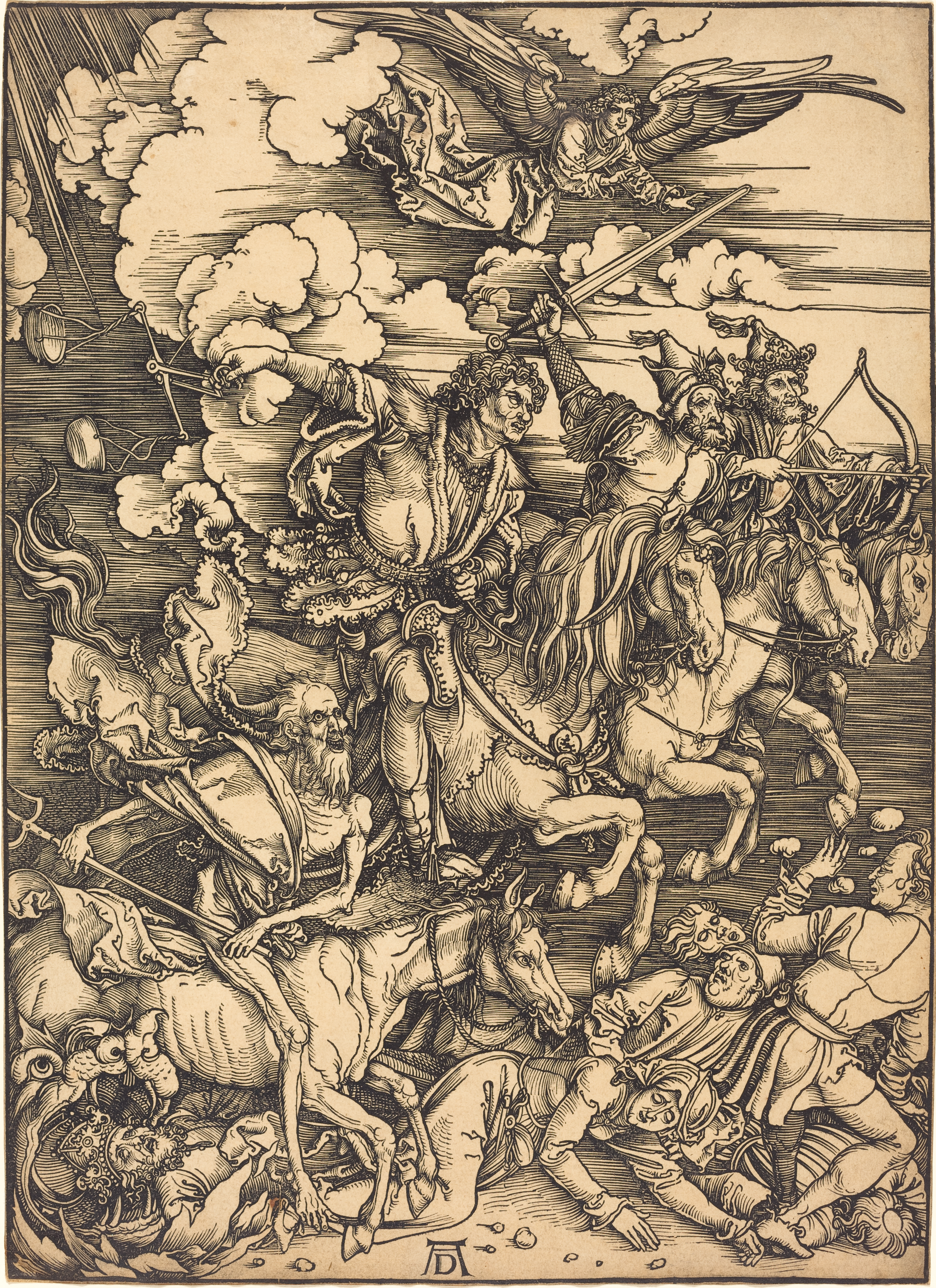
The Four Horsemen c. 1496–98 by Albrecht Dürer, depicting the Four Horsemen of the Apocalypse

Woodcut is a relief printing technique in printmaking. An artist carves an image into the surface of a block of wood—typically with gouges—leaving the printing parts level with the surface while removing the non-printing parts. Areas that the artist cuts away carry no ink, while characters or images at surface level carry the ink to produce the print. The block is cut along the wood grain (unlike wood engraving, where the block is cut in the end-grain). The surface is covered with ink by rolling over the surface with an ink-covered roller (brayer), leaving ink upon the flat surface but not in the non-printing areas.

Multiple colours can be printed by keying the paper to a frame around the woodblocks (using a different block for each colour). The art of carving the woodcut can be called xylography, but this is rarely used in English for images alone, although that term and xylographic are used in connection with block books, which are small books containing text and images in the same block. They became popular in Europe during the latter half of the 15th century. A single-sheet woodcut is a woodcut presented as a single stand alone image or print, as opposed to a book illustration.

The older East Asian technique is usually called woodblock printing, covering both carved text and images, typically on the same block. Short books in a similar technique in Europe, mostly made in the 15th century, are called blockbooks. "Woodcut" usually refers to images only and has spread around the world from Europe to other parts of Asia, and to Latin America.

== Division of labour ==
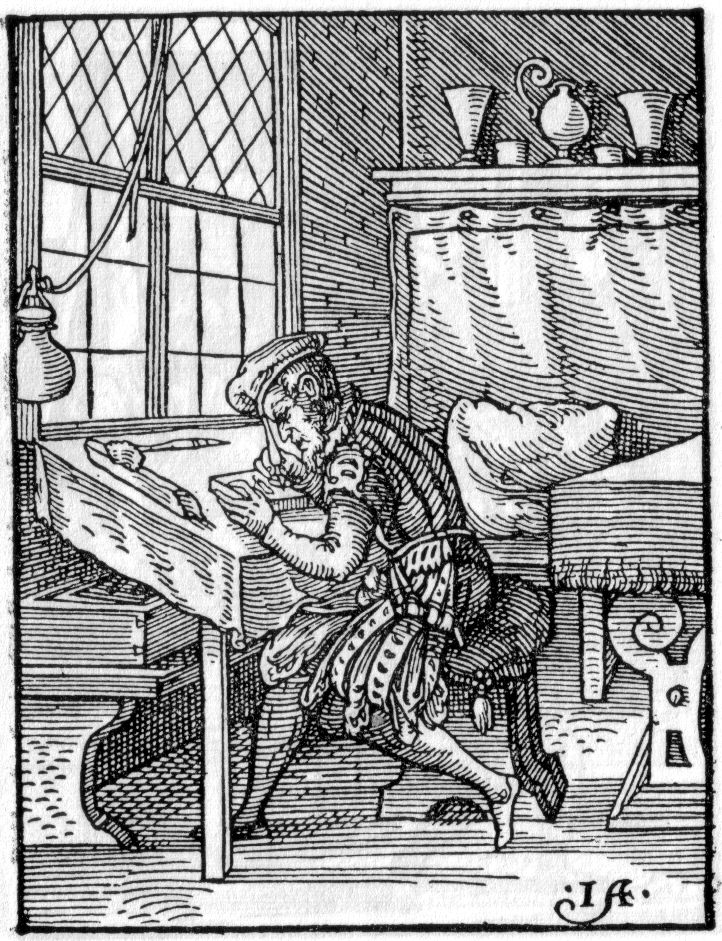
Block Cutter at Work woodcut by Jost Amman, 1568

In both Europe and East Asia, traditionally the artist only designed the woodcut, and the block-carving was left to specialist craftsmen, called formschneider or block-cutters, some of whom became well known in their own right. Among these, the best-known are the 16th-century Hieronymus Andreae (who also used "Formschneider" as his surname), Hans Lützelburger and Jost de Negker, all of whom ran workshops and also operated as printers and publishers. The formschneider in turn handed the block on to specialist printers. There were further specialists who made the blank blocks.

This is why woodcuts are sometimes described by museums or books as "designed by" rather than "by" an artist; but most authorities do not use this distinction. The division of labour had the advantage that a trained artist could adapt to the medium relatively easily, without needing to learn the use of woodworking tools.

There were various methods of transferring the artist's drawn design onto the block for the cutter to follow. Either the drawing would be made directly onto the block (often whitened first), or a drawing on paper was glued to the block. Either way, the artist's drawing was destroyed during the cutting process. Other methods were used, including tracing.

In both Europe and East Asia in the early 20th century, some artists began to do the whole process themselves. In Japan, this movement was called sōsaku-hanga (創作版画, creative prints), as opposed to shin-hanga (新版画, new prints), a movement that retained traditional methods. In the West, many artists used the easier technique of linocut instead.

== Methods of printing ==
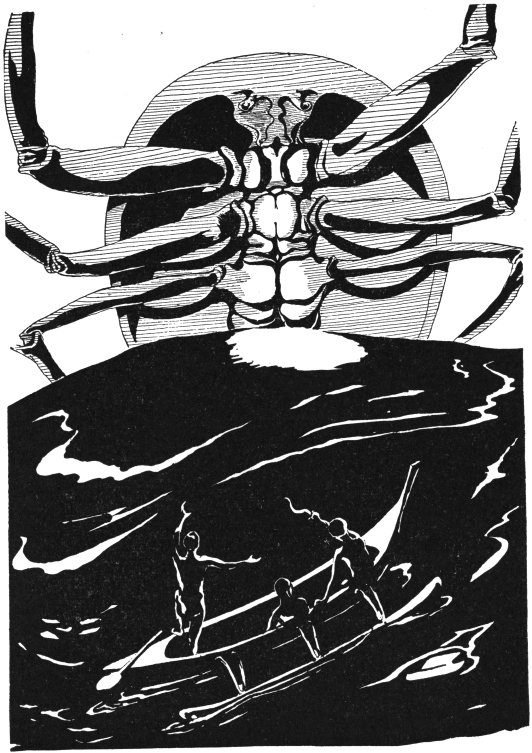
The Crab that played with the sea, Woodcut by Rudyard Kipling illustrating one of his Just So Stories (1902). In mixed white-line (below) and normal woodcut (above).

Compared to intaglio techniques like etching and engraving, only low pressure is required to print. As a relief method, it is only necessary to ink the block and bring it into firm and even contact with the paper or cloth to achieve an acceptable print. In Europe, a variety of woods including boxwood and several nut and fruit woods like pear or cherry were commonly used; in Japan, the wood of the cherry species Prunus serrulata was preferred.

There are three methods of printing to consider:

- Stamping: Used for many fabrics and most early European woodcuts (1400–40). These were printed by putting the paper/fabric on a table or other flat surface with the block on top, and pressing or hammering the back of the block.
- Rubbing: Apparently the most common method for Far Eastern printing on paper at all times. Used for European woodcuts and block-books later in the fifteenth century, and very widely for cloth. Also used for many Western woodcuts from about 1910 to the present. The block goes face up on a table, with the paper or fabric on top. The back is rubbed with a "hard pad, a flat piece of wood, a burnisher, or a leather frotton". A traditional Japanese tool used for this is called a baren. Later in Japan, complex wooden mechanisms were used to help hold the woodblock perfectly still and to apply proper pressure in the printing process. This was especially helpful once multiple colours were introduced and had to be applied with precision atop previous ink layers.
- Printing in a press: presses only seem to have been used in Asia in relatively recent times. Printing-presses were used from about 1480 for European prints and block-books, and before that for woodcut book illustrations. Simple weighted presses may have been used in Europe before the print-press, but firm evidence is lacking. A deceased Abbess of Mechelen in 1465 had "unum instrumentum ad imprintendum scripturas et ymagines ... cum 14 aliis lapideis printis"—"an instrument for printing texts and pictures ... with 14 stones for printing". This is probably too early to be a Gutenberg-type printing press in that location.

== History ==
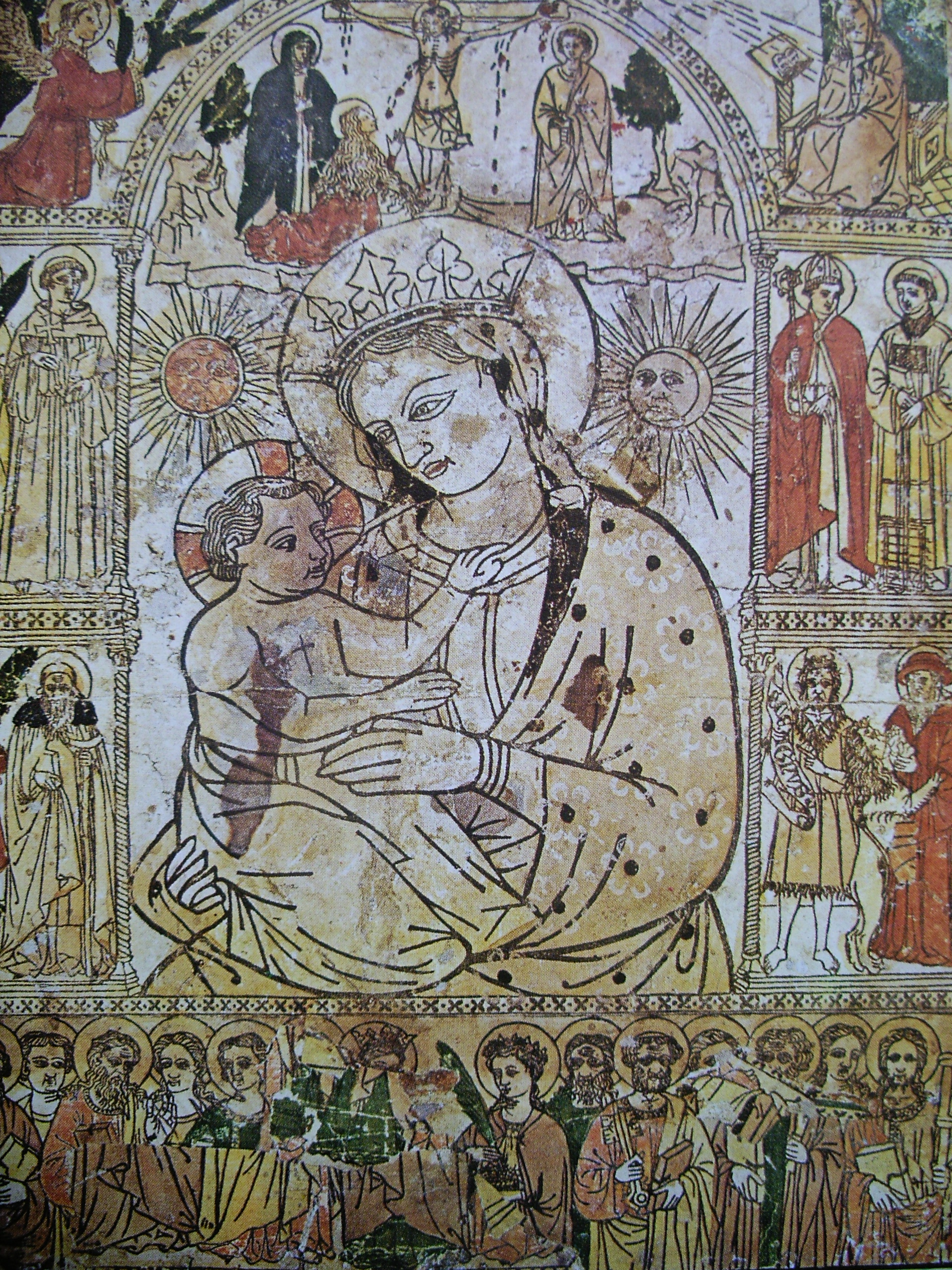
Madonna del Fuoco (Madonna of the Fire, c. 1425), Cathedral of Forlì, in Italy

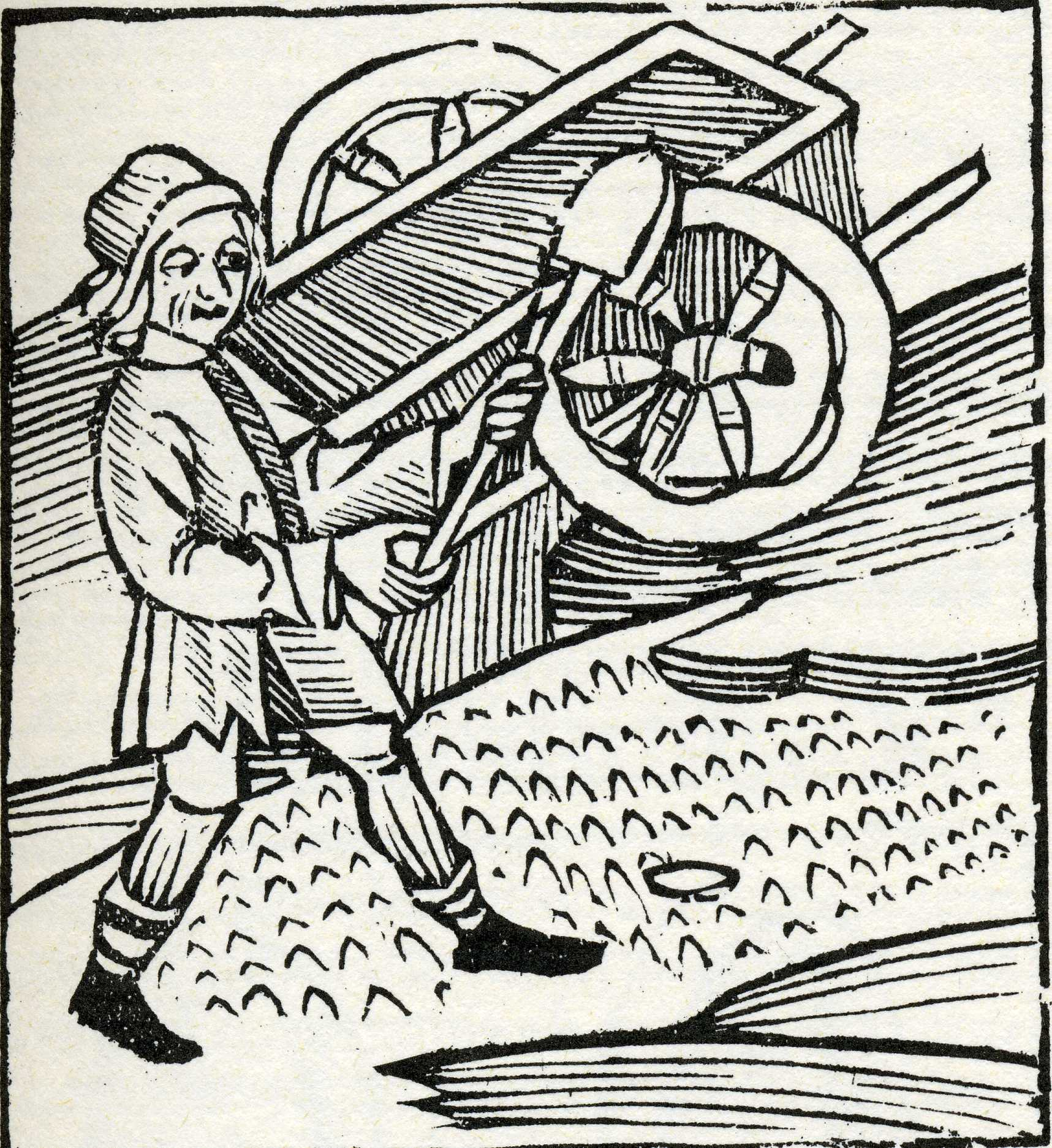
A less sophisticated woodcut book illustration of the Hortus Sanitatis lapidary, Venice, Bernardino Benaglio e Giovanni de Cereto (1511)

Woodcut originated in China in antiquity as a method of printing on textiles and later on paper. The earliest woodblock printed fragments to survive are from China, from the Han dynasty (before 220), and are of silk printed with flowers in three colours. "In the 13th century the Chinese technique of blockprinting was transmitted to Europe." Paper arrived in Europe, also from China via al-Andalus, slightly later, and was being manufactured in Italy by the end of the thirteenth century, and in Burgundy and Germany by the end of the fourteenth. The Islamic world may have further provided Europe with the technique of blockprinting via Egyptian Romani migrating into Bavaria and Bohemia at the start of the 15th century. They had experience in ṭarsh printing since the 10th century, and there are numerous similarities between early European woodcuts and the ṭarsh, such as the focus on religious iconography, the lack of workshop identifiers, and being impressed on a single side of a page, with a yellow, red, brown and green color palette.

In Europe, woodcut is the oldest technique used for old master prints, developing about 1400, by using, on paper, existing techniques for printing. One of the more ancient single-leaf woodcuts on paper that can be seen today is The Fire Madonna (Madonna del Fuoco, in the Italian language), in the Cathedral of Forlì, in Italy. Initially religious subjects, often very small indeed, were by far the most common. Many were sold to pilgrims at their destination, and glued to walls in homes, inside the lids of boxes, and sometimes even included in bandages over wounds, which was superstitiously believed to help healing.

The explosion of sales of cheap woodcuts in the middle of the century led to a fall in standards, and many popular prints were very crude. The development of hatching followed on rather later than engraving. Michael Wolgemut was significant in making German woodcuts more sophisticated from about 1475, and Erhard Reuwich was the first to use cross-hatching (far harder to do than engraving or etching). Both of these produced mainly book-illustrations, as did various Italian artists who were also raising standards there at the same period. At the end of the century Albrecht Dürer brought the Western woodcut to a level that, arguably, has never been surpassed, and greatly increased the status of the "single-leaf" woodcut (i.e. an image sold separately). He briefly made it equivalent in quality and status to engravings, before he turned to these himself.

In the first half of the 16th century, high quality woodcuts continued to be produced in Germany and Italy, where Titian and other artists arranged for some to be made. Much of the interest was in developing the chiaroscuro woodcut, using multiple blocks printed in different colours.

Because woodcuts and movable type are both relief-printed, they can easily be printed together. Consequently, woodcut was the main medium for book illustrations until the late sixteenth century. The first woodcut book illustration dates to about 1461, only a few years after the beginning of printing with movable type, printed by Albrecht Pfister in Bamberg. Woodcut was used less often for individual ("single-leaf") fine-art prints from about 1550 until the late nineteenth century, when interest revived. It remained important for popular prints until the nineteenth century in most of Europe, and later in some places.

The art reached a high level of technical and artistic development in East Asia and Iran. Woodblock printing in Japan is called moku-hanga and was introduced in the seventeenth century for both books and art. The popular "floating world" genre of ukiyo-e originated in the second half of the seventeenth century, with prints in monochrome or two colours. Sometimes these were hand-coloured after printing. Later, prints with many colours were developed. Japanese woodcut became a major artistic form, although at the time it was accorded a much lower status than painting. It continued to develop through to the twentieth century.

== White-line woodcut ==
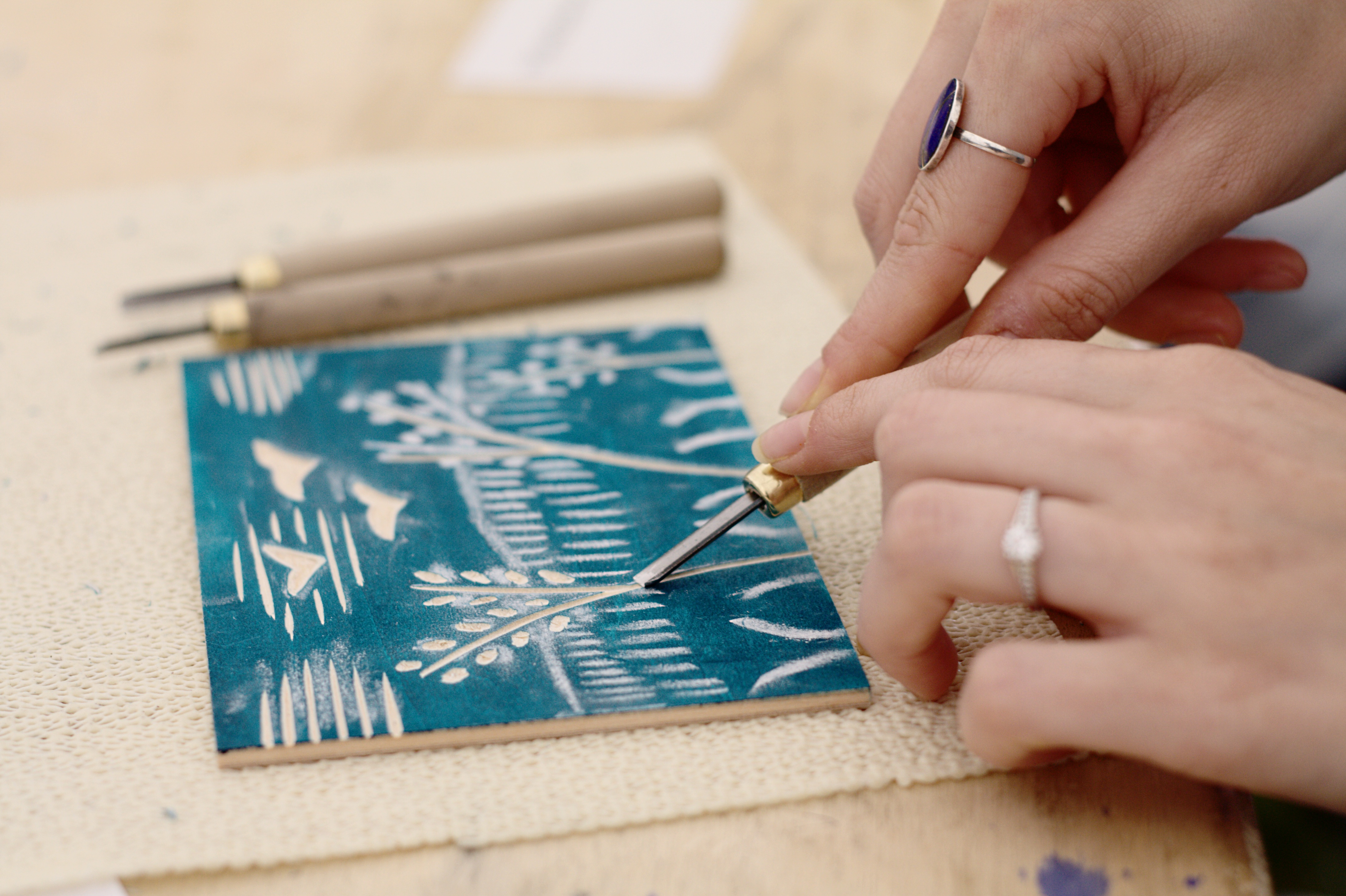
Using a handheld gouge to cut a "white-line" woodcut design into Japanese plywood. The design has been sketched in chalk on a painted face of the plywood.

This technique just carves the image in mostly thin lines, similar to a rather crude engraving. The block is printed in the normal way, so that most of the print is black with the image created by white lines. This process was invented by the sixteenth-century Swiss artist Urs Graf, but became most popular in the nineteenth and twentieth century, often in a modified form where images used large areas of white-line contrasted with areas in the normal black-line style. This was pioneered by Félix Vallotton. The early 20th-century American Provincetown Printers developed a type of white-line woodcut in colours.

== Japonism ==
In the 1860s, just as the Japanese themselves were becoming aware of Western art in general, Japanese prints began to reach Europe in considerable numbers and became very fashionable, especially in France. They had a great influence on many artists, notably Édouard Manet, Pierre Bonnard, Henri de Toulouse-Lautrec, Edgar Degas, Paul Gauguin, Vincent van Gogh, Félix Vallotton and Mary Cassatt. In 1872, Jules Claretie dubbed the trend "Le Japonisme".

Though the Japanese influence was reflected in many artistic media, including painting, it did lead to a revival of the woodcut in Europe, which had been in danger of extinction as a serious art medium. Most of the artists above, except for Félix Vallotton and Paul Gauguin, in fact used lithography, especially for coloured prints. See below for Japanese influence in illustrations for children's books.

Artists, notably Edvard Munch and Franz Masereel, continued to use the medium, which in Modernism came to appeal because it was relatively easy to complete the whole process, including printing, in a studio with little special equipment. The German Expressionists used woodcut a good deal.

== Colour ==
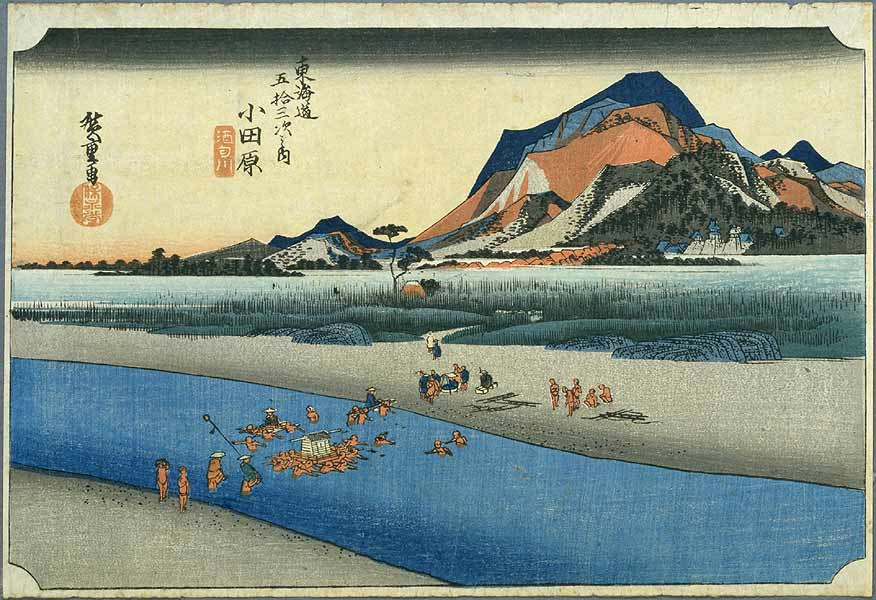
Odawara-juku in the 1830s by Hiroshige, from his series The Fifty-Three Stations of the Tōkaidō

Coloured woodcuts first appeared in ancient China. The oldest known are three Buddhist images dating to the 10th century. European woodcut prints with coloured blocks were invented in Germany in 1508, and are known as chiaroscuro woodcuts (see below). However, colour did not become the norm, as it did in Japan in the ukiyo-e and other forms.

In Europe and Japan, colour woodcuts were normally only used for prints rather than book illustrations. In China, where the individual print did not develop until the nineteenth century, the reverse is true, and early colour woodcuts mostly occur in luxury books about art, especially the more prestigious medium of painting. The first known example is a book on ink-cakes printed in 1606, and colour technique reached its height in books on painting published in the seventeenth century. Notable examples are Hu Zhengyan's Treatise on the Paintings and Writings of the Ten Bamboo Studio of 1633, and the Mustard Seed Garden Painting Manual published in 1679 and 1701.

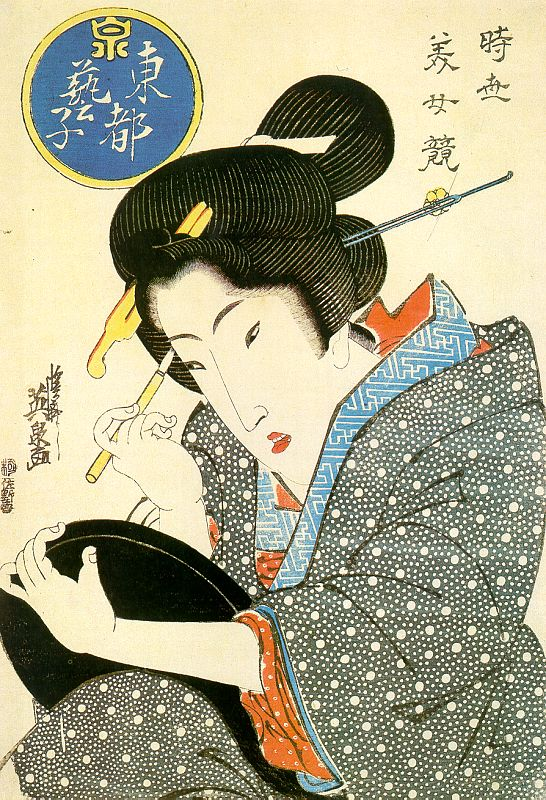
Bijin (beautiful woman) ukiyo-e by Keisai Eisen, before 1848

In Japan colour technique, called nishiki-e in its fully developed form, spread more widely, and was used for prints, from the 1760s on. Text was nearly always monochrome, as were images in books, but the growth of the popularity of ukiyo-e brought with it demand for ever-increasing numbers of colours and complexity of techniques. By the nineteenth century most artists worked in colour. The stages of this development were:

- Sumizuri-e (墨摺り絵, "ink printed pictures") – monochrome printing using only black ink
- Benizuri-e (紅摺り絵, "crimson printed pictures") – red ink details or highlights added by hand after the printing process; green was sometimes used as well
- Tan-e (丹絵) – orange highlights using a red pigment called tan
- Aizuri-e (藍摺り絵, "indigo printed pictures"), Murasaki-e (紫絵, "purple pictures"), and other styles that used a single colour in addition to, or instead of, black ink
- Urushi-e (漆絵) – a method that used glue to thicken the ink, emboldening the image; gold, mica and other substances were often used to enhance the image further. Urushi-e can also refer to paintings using lacquer instead of paint; lacquer was very rarely if ever used on prints.
- Nishiki-e (錦絵, "brocade pictures") – a method that used multiple blocks for separate portions of the image, so a number of colours could achieve incredibly complex and detailed images; a separate block was carved to apply only to the portion of the image designated for a single colour. Registration marks called kentō (見当) ensured correspondence between the application of each block.

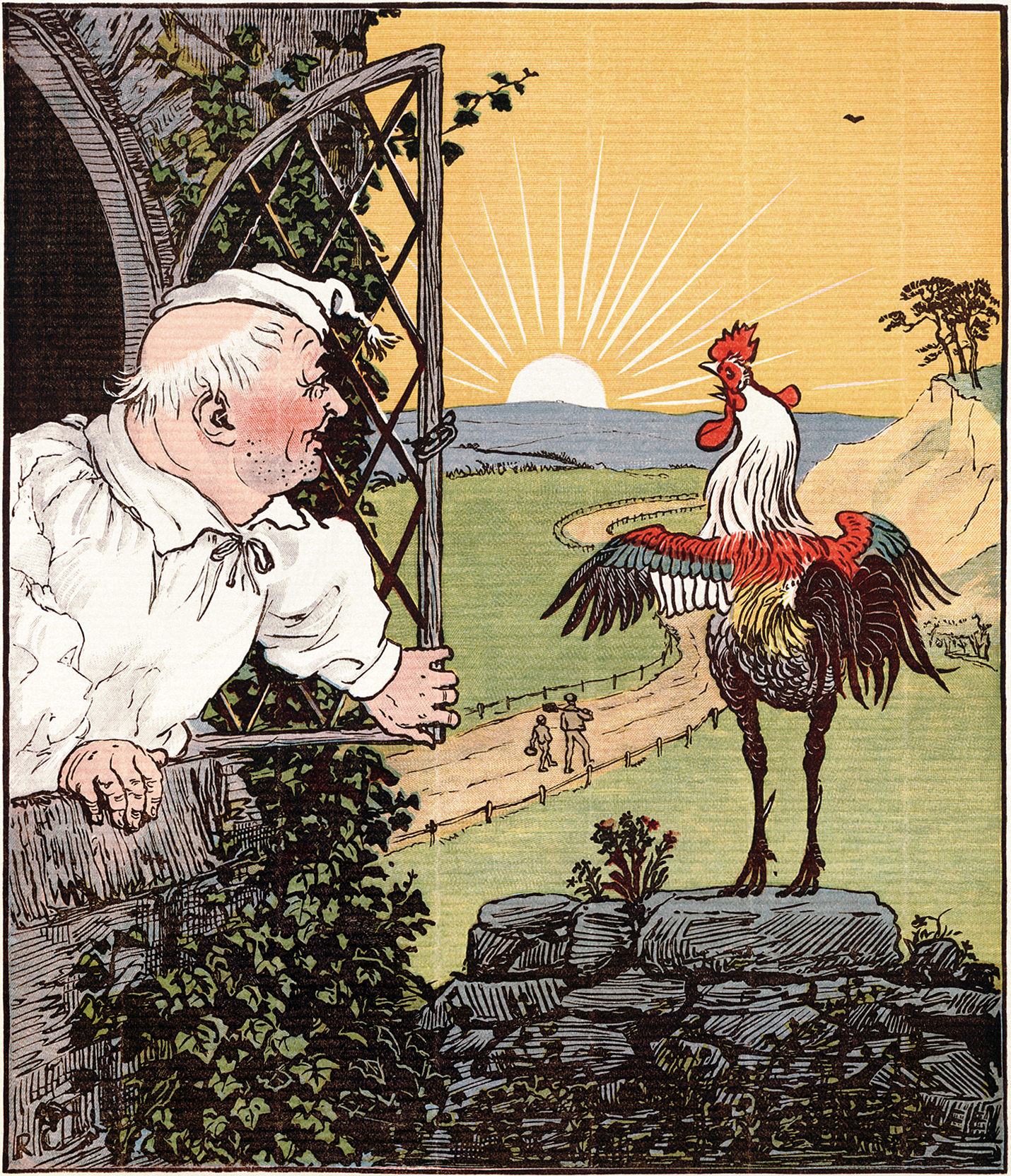
Children's book illustration by Randolph Caldecott; engraving and printing by Edmund Evans, 1887

A number of different methods of colour printing using woodcut (technically chromoxylography) were developed in Europe in the 19th century. In 1835, George Baxter patented a method using an intaglio line plate (or occasionally a lithograph), printed in black or a dark colour, and then overprinted with up to twenty different colours from woodblocks. Edmund Evans used relief and wood throughout, with up to eleven different colours, and latterly specialized in illustrations for children's books, using fewer blocks but overprinting non-solid areas of colour to achieve blended colours. Artists such as Randolph Caldecott, Walter Crane and Kate Greenaway were influenced by the Japanese prints now available and fashionable in Europe to create a suitable style, with flat areas of colour.

Malo-Renault colour woodcut for les Cent Bibliophiles 1922

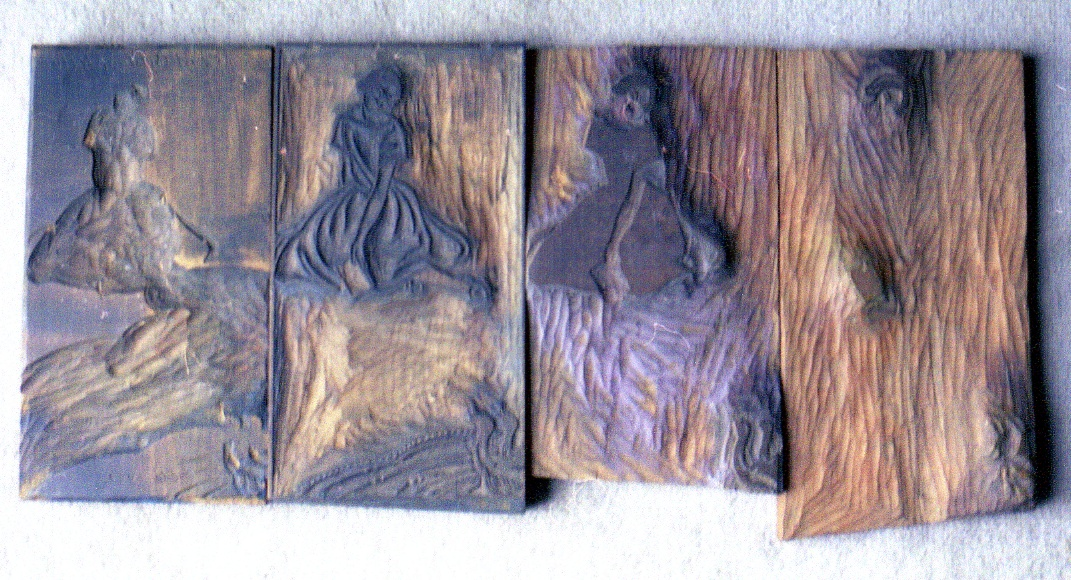
A matrix for each of the 4 colours

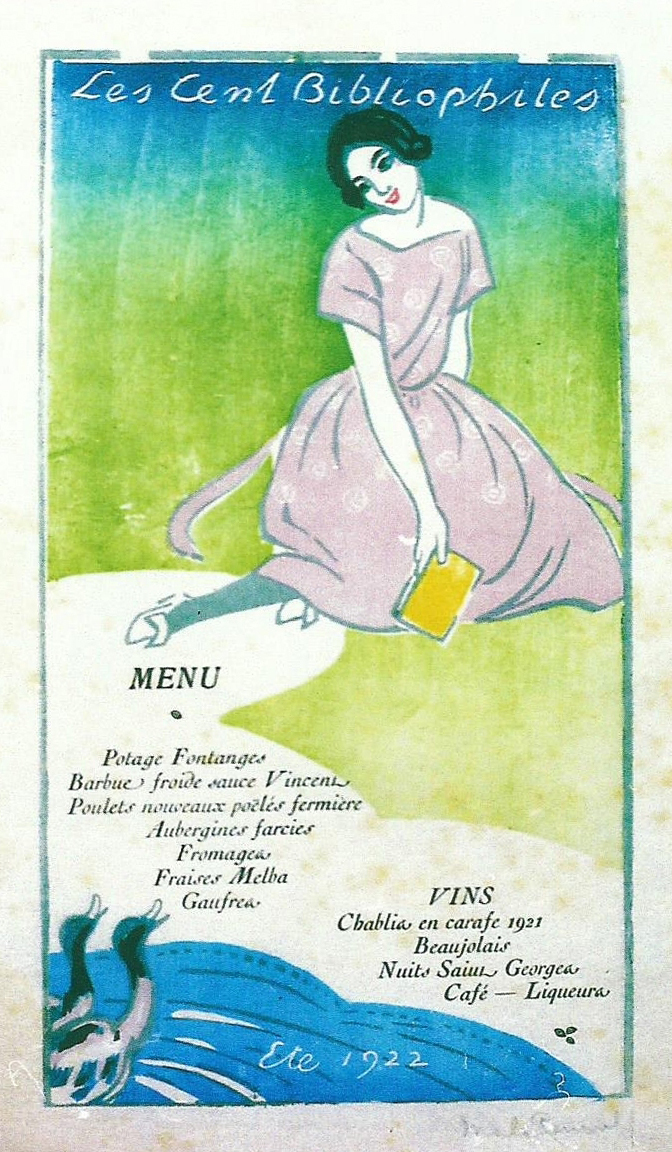
Colour printing registration

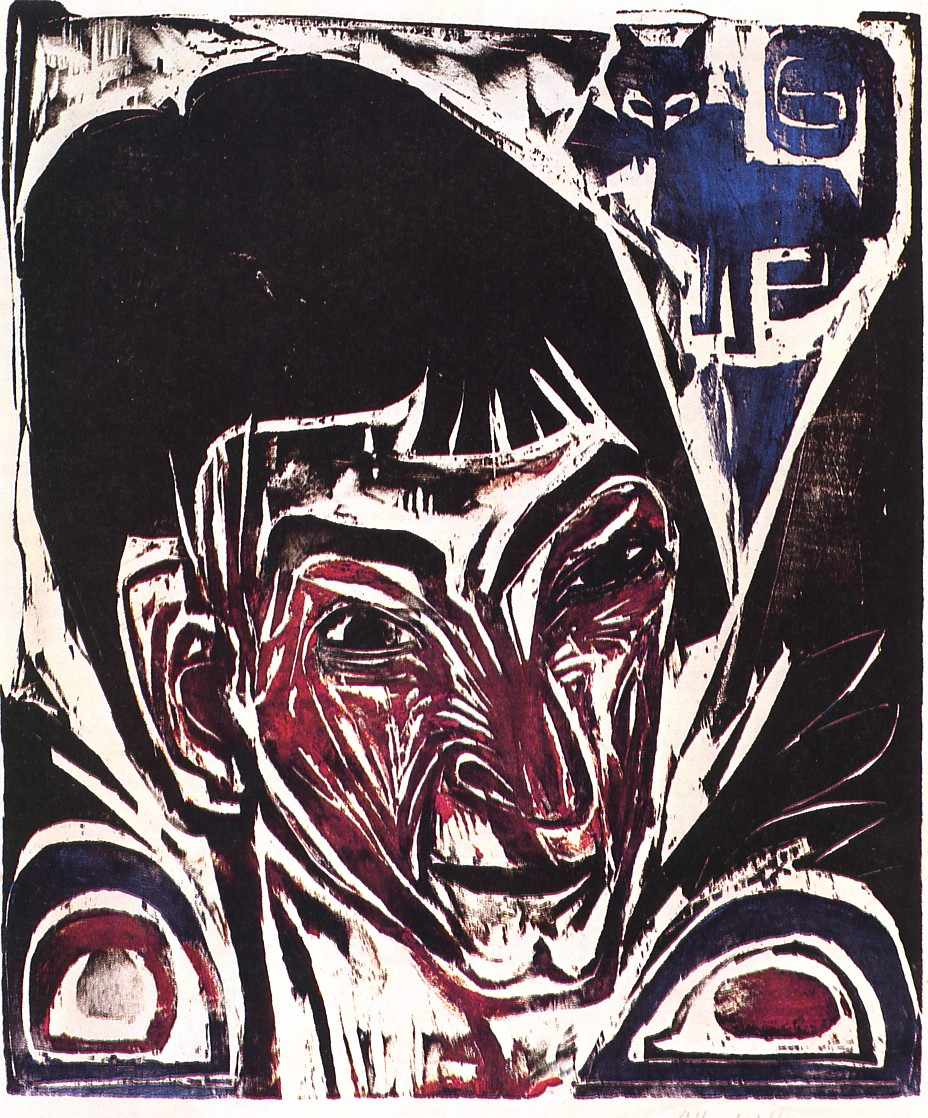
Ernst Ludwig Kirchner, Portrait of Otto Müller (1915)

In the 20th century, Ernst Ludwig Kirchner of the Die Brücke group developed a process of producing coloured woodcut prints using a single block applying different colours to the block with a brush à la poupée and then printing (halfway between a woodcut and a monotype). A remarkable example of this technique is the 1915 Portrait of Otto Müller woodcut print from the collection of the British Museum.

=== Gallery of East Asian woodcuts ===
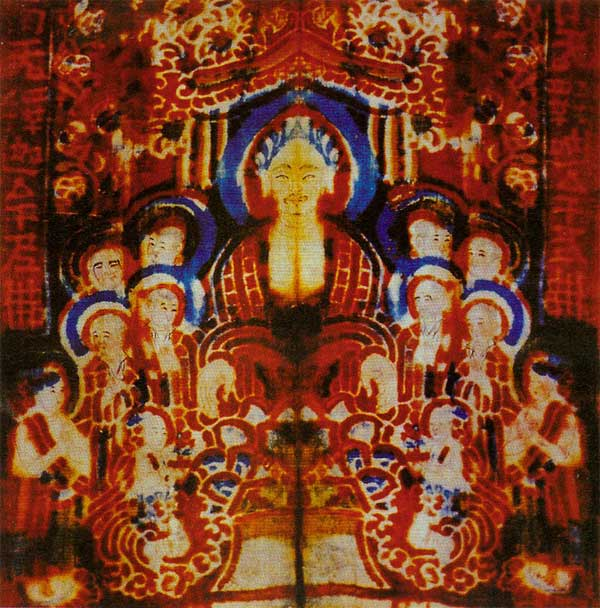
Coloured woodcut of Gautama Buddha, 10th century, China.

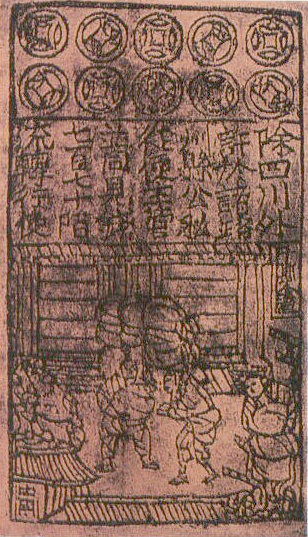
Jiaozi (currency), 10th century, Sichuan, China.

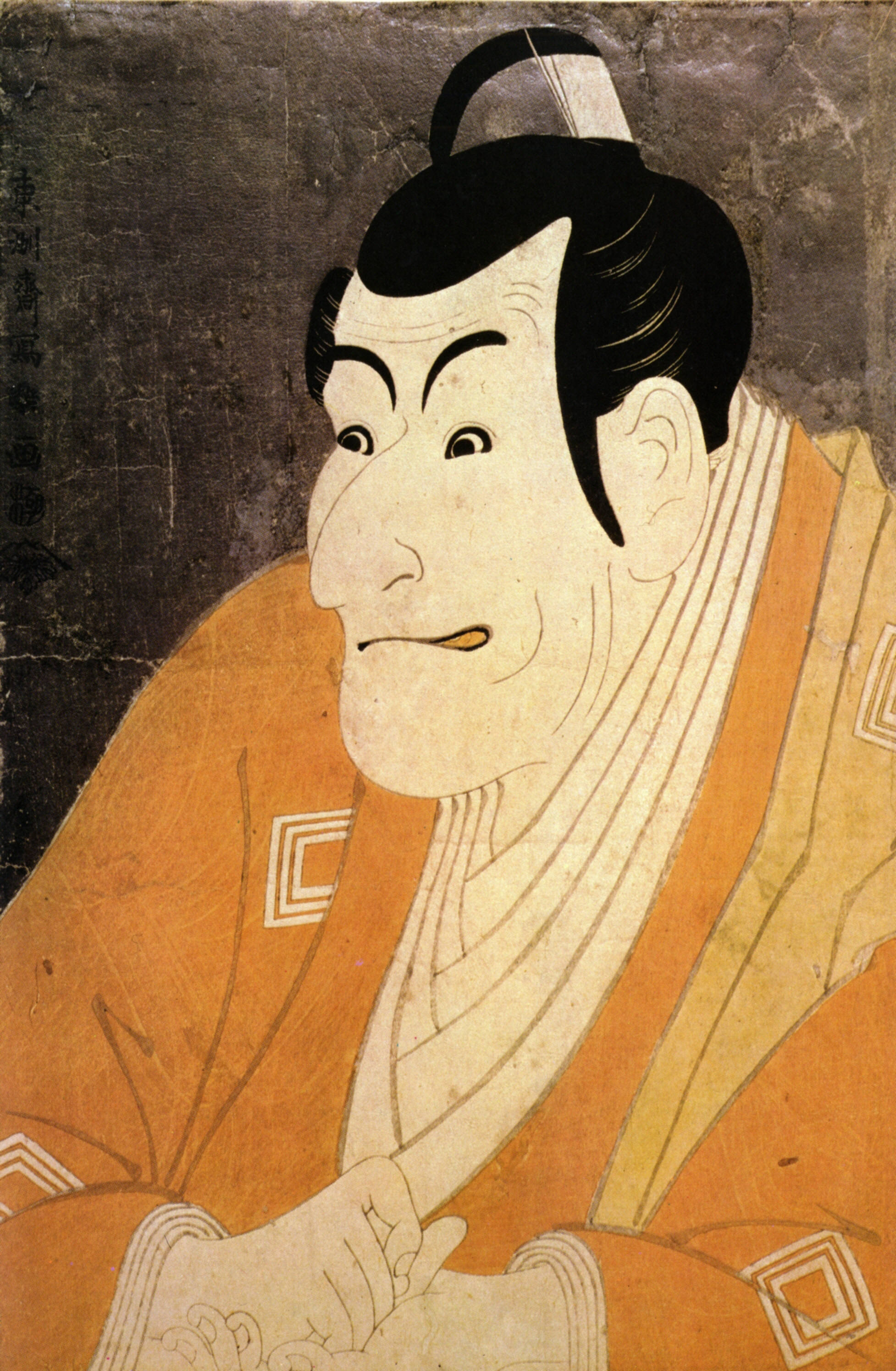
Actor Ichikawa Ebizō IV as Takemura Sadanoshin, Japanese woodcut by Sharaku, 1794.

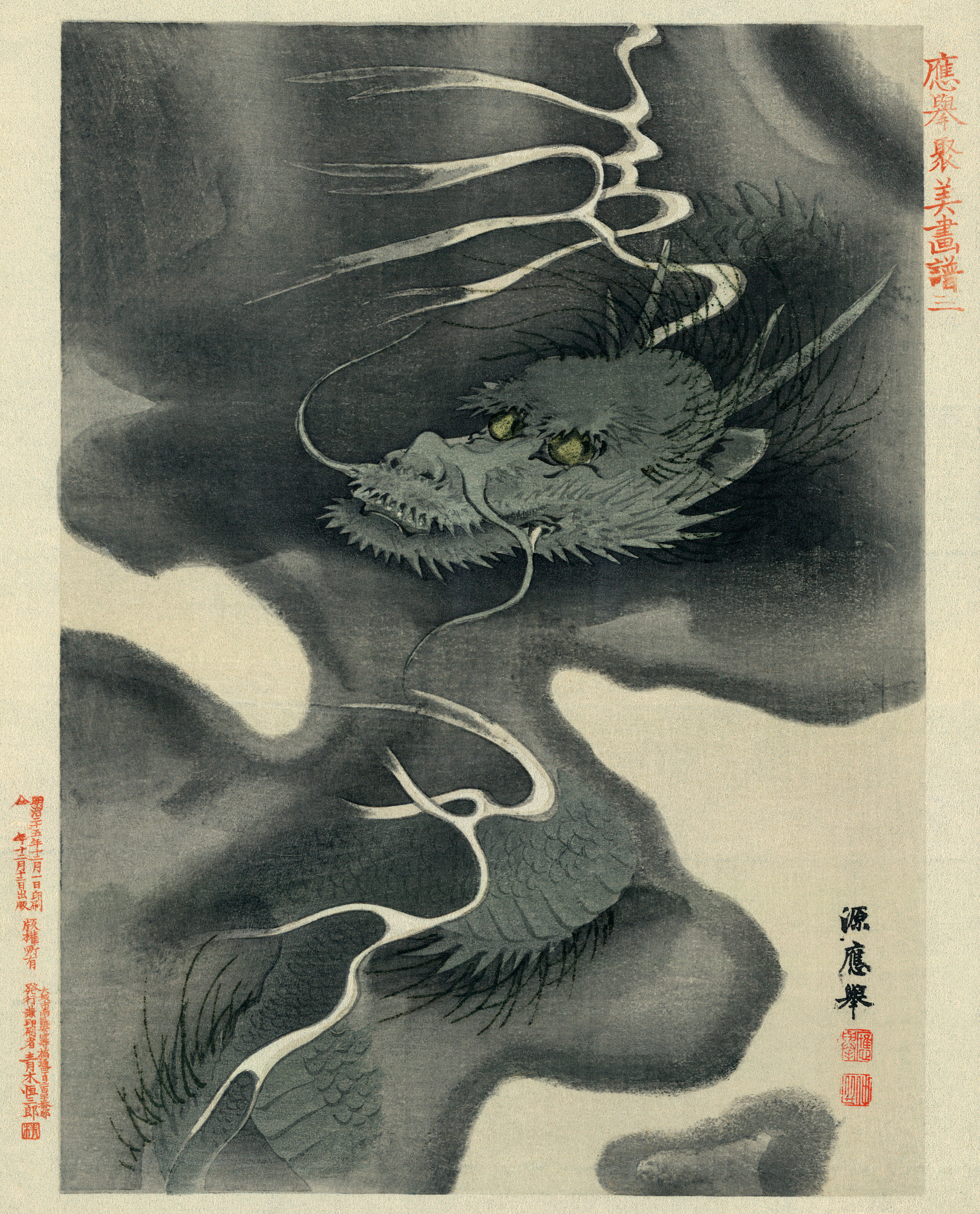
Dragon, Japanese woodcut by Yoshida Gen'ō, 1892.

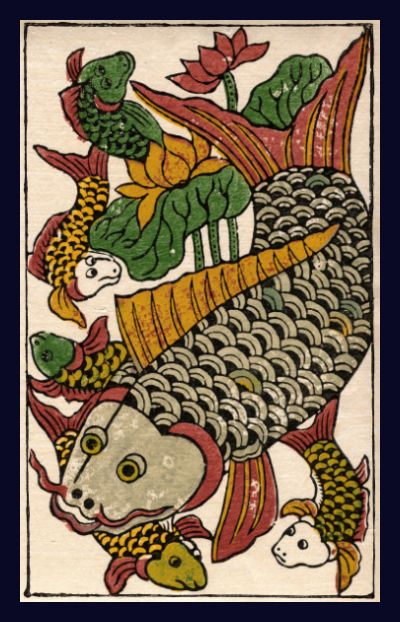
Modern woodcut Carp Painting, Đông Hồ painting, Vietnam.

== Chiaroscuro woodcuts ==
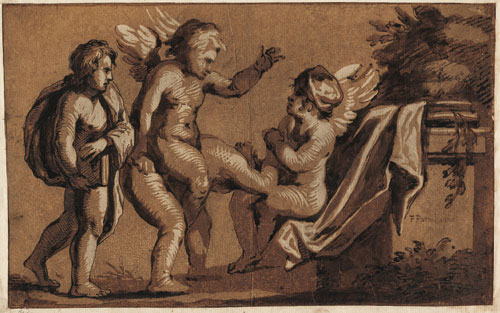
Chiaroscuro woodcut depicting Playing cupids by anonymous 16th-century Italian artist

Chiaroscuro woodcuts are old master prints in woodcut using two or more blocks printed in different colours; they do not necessarily feature strong contrasts of light and dark. They were first produced to achieve similar effects to chiaroscuro drawings. After some early experiments in book-printing, the true chiaroscuro woodcut conceived for two blocks was probably first invented by Lucas Cranach the Elder in Germany in 1508 or 1509, though he backdated some of his first prints and added tone blocks to some prints first produced for monochrome printing, swiftly followed by Hans Burgkmair. Despite Giorgio Vasari's claim for Italian precedence in Ugo da Carpi, it is clear that his, the first Italian examples, date to around 1516.

Other printmakers to use the technique include Hans Baldung and Parmigianino. In the German states the technique was in use largely during the first decades of the sixteenth century, but Italians continued to use it throughout the century, and later artists like Hendrik Goltzius sometimes made use of it. In the German style, one block usually had only lines and is called the "line block", whilst the other block or blocks had flat areas of colour and are called "tone blocks". The Italians usually used only tone blocks, for a very different effect, much closer to the chiaroscuro drawings the term was originally used for, or to watercolour paintings.

The Swedish printmaker Torsten Billman (1909–1989) developed during the 1930s and 1940s a variant chiaroscuro technique with several gray tones from ordinary printing ink. The art historian Gunnar Jungmarker (1902–1983) at Stockholm's Nationalmuseum called this technique "grisaille woodcut". It is a time-consuming printing process, exclusively for hand printing, with several grey-wood blocks aside from the black-and-white key block.

== Modern woodcut printing in Mexico ==
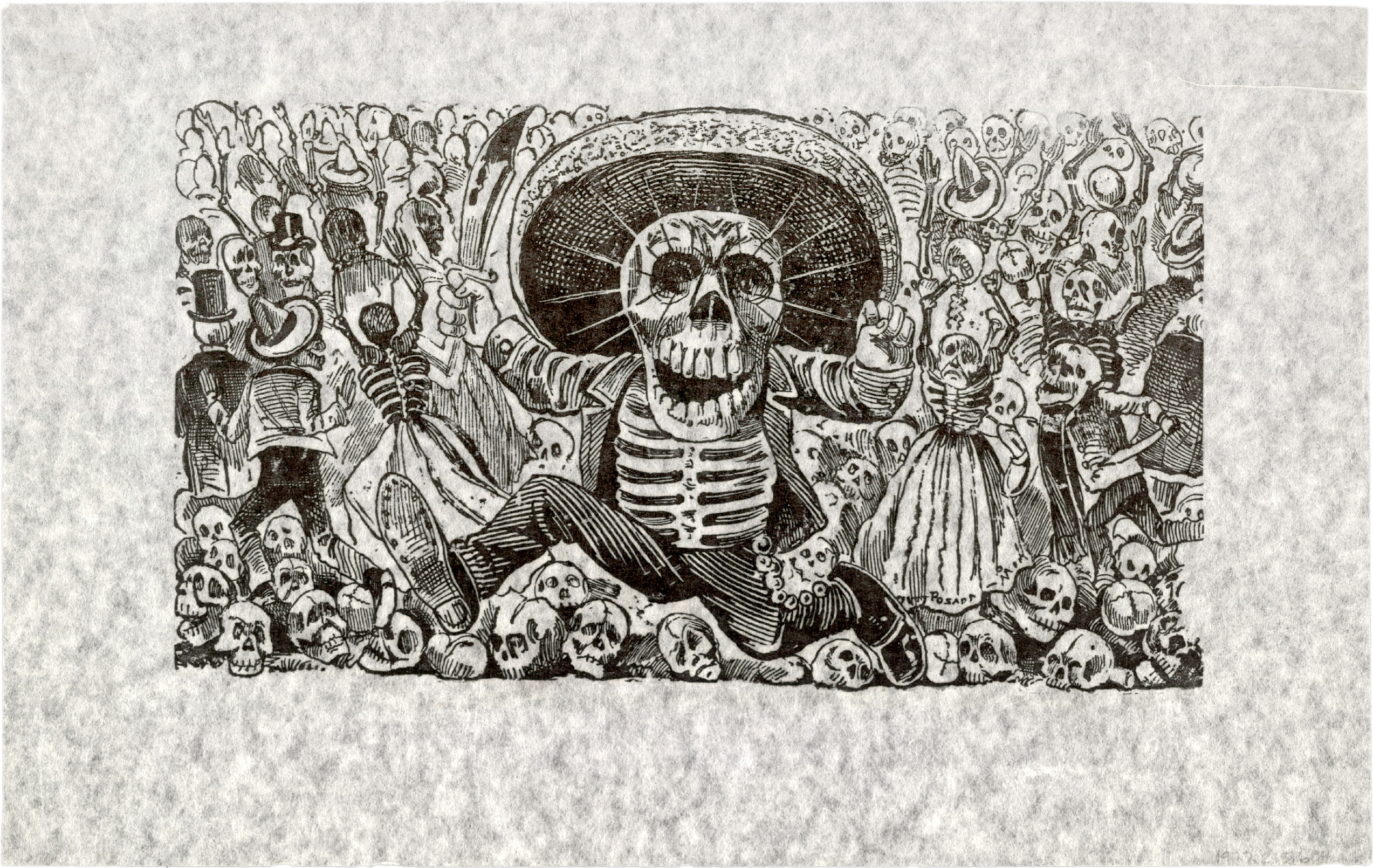
José Guadalupe Posada, Calavera Oaxaqueña, 1910

Woodcut printmaking became a popular art form in Mexico during the early to mid-20th century. The medium in Mexico was used to convey political unrest and was a form of political activism, especially after the Mexican Revolution (1910–1920). In Europe, Russia, and China, woodcut art was being used during this time as well to spread leftist politics such as socialism, communism, and anti-fascism. In Mexico, the art style was made popular by José Guadalupe Posada, who was known as the father of graphic art and printmaking in Mexico and is considered the first Mexican modern artist. He was a satirical cartoonist and an engraver before and during the Mexican Revolution and he popularized Mexican folk and indigenous art. He created the woodcut engravings of the iconic skeleton (calaveras) figures that are prominent in Mexican arts and culture today (such as in Disney Pixar's Coco). See La Calavera Catrina for more on Posada's calaveras.

In 1921, Jean Charlot, a French printmaker, moved to Mexico City. Recognizing the importance of Posada's woodcut engravings, he began teaching woodcut techniques at the open-air art schools in Coyoacán. Many young Mexican artists attended these lessons including the Fernando Leal.

After the Mexican Revolution, the country was in political and social upheaval, with worker strikes, protests, and marches. These events needed cheap, mass-produced visual prints to be pasted on walls or handed out during protests. Information needed to be spread quickly and cheaply to the general public. Many people were still illiterate during this time, and there was a push after the Revolution for widespread education. In 1910, when the Revolution began, only 20% of Mexican people could read. Art was considered to be highly important in this cause and political artists were using journals and newspapers to communicate their ideas through illustration. El Machete (1924–29) was a popular communist journal that used woodcut prints. The woodcut art served well because it was a popular style that many could understand.

Artists and activists created collectives such as the Taller de Gráfica Popular (TGP) (1937–present) and The Treintatreintistas (1928–1930) to create prints (many of them woodcut prints) that reflected their socialist and communist values. The TGP attracted artists from all around the world including African American printmaker Elizabeth Catlett, whose woodcut prints later influenced the art of social movements in the US in the 1960s and 1970s. The Treintatreintistas even taught workers and children. The tools for woodcutting are readily available, and the techniques are easy to learn. It was considered an art for the people.

Mexico at this time was trying to discover its identity and develop itself as a unified nation. The form and style of woodcut aesthetic allowed a diverse range of topics and visual culture to look unified. Traditional and avant-garde images shared a similar aesthetic when engraved into wood. An image of the countryside and a traditional farmer appeared similar to an image of a city. This symbolism benefited politicians who wanted a unified nation. The physical actions of carving and printing woodcuts also supported the values many held about manual labour and supporting workers' rights.

=== Current woodcut practices in Mexico ===
Today, in Mexico, the activist woodcut tradition is still alive. In Oaxaca, collectives formed during and after the 2006 Oaxaca protests continue to use woodcut art for social change. The Asamblea de Artistas Revolucionarios de Oaxaca (ASARO), Colectivo Subterráneos, Lapiztola, and Taller Artístico Comunitario produce relief prints addressing indigenous rights, migration, and political resistance, which they convert into wheat-paste posters applied to public walls. Artemio Rodriguez is another artist who lives in Tacambaro, Michoacán who makes politically charged woodcut prints about contemporary issues.

== Famous works in woodcut ==
Europe

- Ars moriendi
- Dürer's Rhinoceros
- Emblem books
- Four Horsemen of the Apocalypse
- Hypnerotomachia Poliphili
- Just So Stories
- Lubok prints
- Nuremberg Chronicle

Japan (Ukiyo-e)

- Takiyasha the Witch and the Skeleton Spectre
- The Dream of the Fisherman's Wife
- Thirty-six Views of Mount Fuji (includes The Great Wave off Kanagawa)

== Notable artists ==
The Prophet, woodcut by Emil Nolde, 1912, various collections

- Irving Amen
- Mary Azarian
- Aubrey Beardsley
- Hans Baldung
- Leonard Baskin
- Gustave Baumann
- Torsten Billman
- Carroll Thayer Berry
- Emma Bormann
- Erich Buchholz
- Hans Burgkmair
- Domenico Campagnola
- Ugo da Carpi
- Billy Childish
- Salvador Dalí
- Gustave Doré
- Albrecht Dürer
- M. C. Escher
- James Flora
- Antonio Frasconi
- Franz Gertsch
- Robert Gibbings
- Vincent van Gogh
- Urs Graf
- HAP Grieshaber
- Suzuki Harunobu
- Hiroshige
- Damien Hirst
- Jacques Hnizdovsky
- Hokusai
- Tom Huck
- Stephen Huneck
- Alfred Garth Jones
- Hussein El Gebaly
- Ernst Ludwig Kirchner
- Gaga Kovenchuk
- Käthe Kollwitz
- J.J. Lankes
- James Duard Marshall
- Frans Masereel
- Hishikawa Moronobu
- Edvard Munch
- Emil Nolde
- Giovanni Battista Palumba (Master I.B. with a Bird)
- Jacob Pins
- J. G. Posada
- Endi E. Poskovic
- Peter Roempert
- Hannah Tompkins
- Henriette Tirman
- Clément Serveau
- Paul Signac
- Eric Slater
- Marcelo Soares
- Utamaro
- Félix Vallotton
- Karel Vik
- Leopold Wächtler
- Sylvia Solochek Walters
- Susan Dorothea White

== Stonecut ==
In parts of the world (such as the arctic) where wood is rare and expensive, the woodcut technique is used with stone as the medium for the engraved image.

== See also ==
- Chiaroscuro – Use of strong contrasts between light and dark in art
- Cordel literature – Brazilian literary genre
- Linocut – Printmaking technique
- Metalcut – Early printmaking technique
- Old master print – Work of art made printing on paper in the West
- Rubber stamp – Small tool for over-printing
- Shin-hanga – Japanese art movement
- Sōsaku-hanga – Japanese art movement
- Wood carving – Form of working wood by means of a cutting tool
- Ukiyo-e – Genre of Japanese art
