= Iacob Felix =

Romanian physician and hygienist

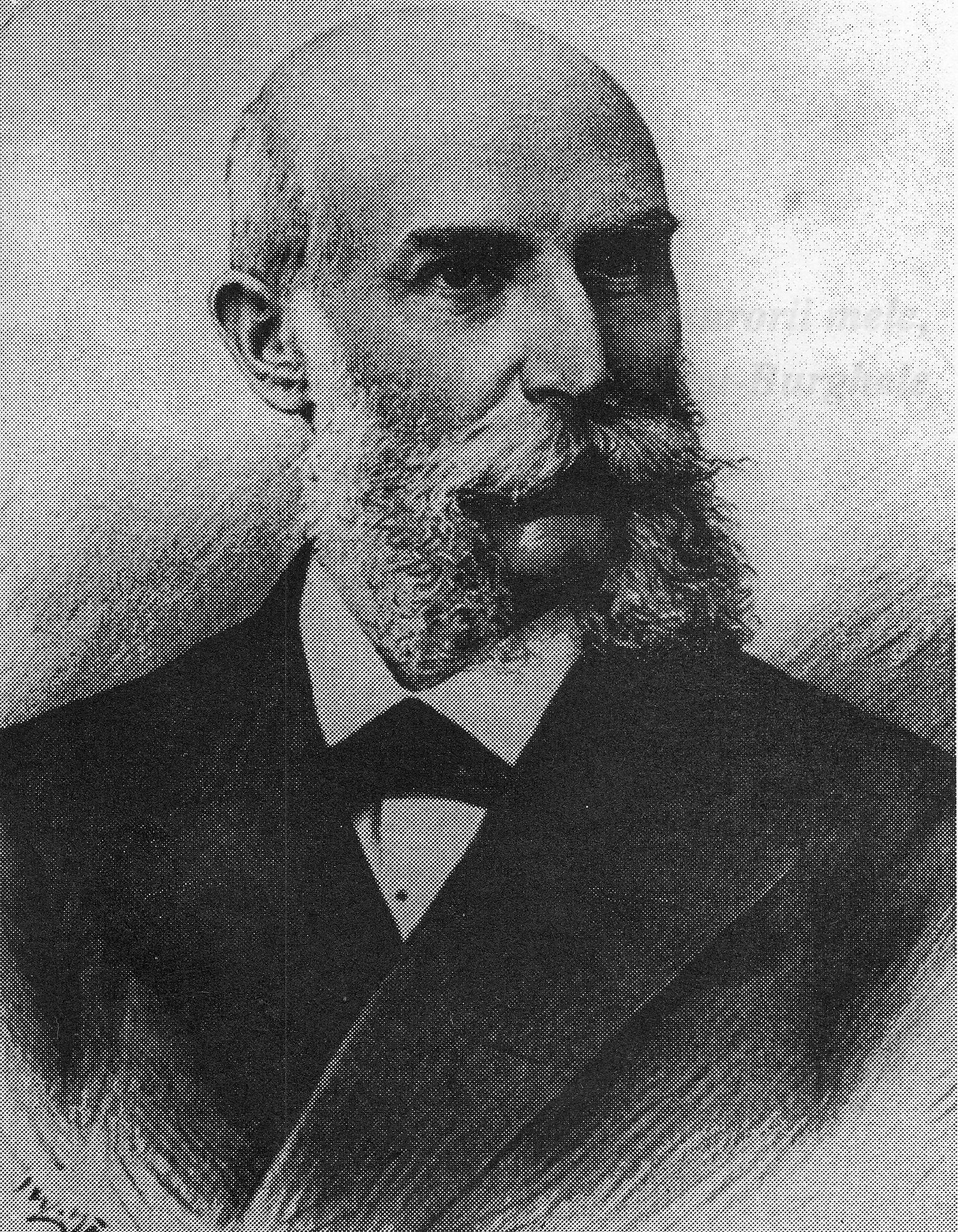
Iacob Felix

Iacob Dimitrie Felix (6 January 1832 – 19 January 1905) was a Romanian physician and hygienist.

== Biography ==
Born in Hořice in the Kingdom of Bohemia, he graduated from high school in Prague and enrolled in the medical faculty of the University of Vienna. There, he became a doctor in medicine and surgery, as well as a specialist in obstetrics. He came from a Jewish family but converted to Christianity during his university days. During the subsequent decades he lived in Romania, he neither discussed his Jewish background nor adopted an attitude suggesting a rejection of Jewishness.

After earning his degree, Felix emigrated to Wallachia, passing the practitioner's examination in August 1858. He worked as a doctor in Oltenița from 1858 to 1859 and in Muscel County from 1859 to 1861. His talent was noticed by Carol Davila, who invited Felix to Bucharest to teach hygienics and public health at the recently established national school of medicine and pharmacy, beginning with the 1861–1862 school year. The institution became the medical faculty of the University of Bucharest in 1869, when he was named head of the hygiene department, a position he held until 1889. Felix served as chief physician of Bucharest from 1865 to 1870 and from 1875 to 1892. He was granted Romanian citizenship in 1871.

In 1877–1878, during the Romanian War of Independence, he served as a combat medic, organizing military hospitals in the Turnu Măgurele area. In 1879, he was elected a titular member of the Romanian Academy. From 1883 to 1887, he was dean of the medical faculty, and from 1892 to 1899 served as director of Romania's public health service. In 1884, he was vice-president of the country's first physicians' congress. In 1898, and again from 1902 to 1904, he was vice-president of the academy's scientific section. In 1884, he was sent into the army reserves with the rank of colonel.

Felix is considered the founder of Romania's school of hygiene and public health, a reputation he acquired during his lifetime. He led one of Europe's first hygiene departments and authored the first epidemiology textbook based on Pasteurian principles.
