= Josephine Kryl =

American violinist (1897–1960)

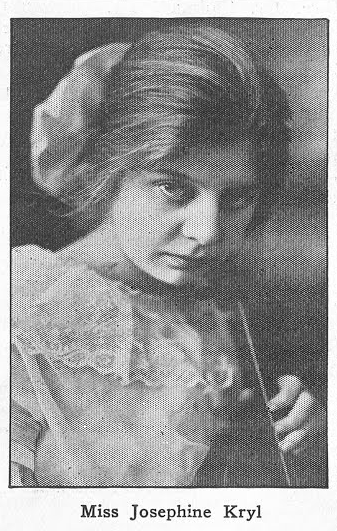
- Josephine Kryl, from a 1914 publication.
- Born: 1897; Indianapolis, Indiana, U.S.
- Died: November 20, 1960 (aged 62–63)
- Occupation: Violinist

Josephine Kryl (1897 – November 20, 1960) was an American violinist.

== Early life ==
Josephine Kryl was born in Indianapolis, Indiana, the daughter of Bohumir Kryl and Mary Jerabek Kryl. Her father was a cornetist from Bohemia. Her mother was born in Vienna, Austria. Her younger sister Marie Kryl also became a professional musician, as a pianist.

Josephine Kryl studied with Leon Semetini, Leopold Auer, and Eugène Ysaÿe.

== Career ==
The Kryls performed together through Josephine's adolescence, sometimes as a family, and sometimes just the sisters. At the start of World War I Josephine Kryl was a teenager, studying in Belgium with Ysäye. Before she could return to the United States, she heard bombardments nearby, saw spies arrested, and survived an attack on a train. After her marriage, she continued to appear with her father and sister in concert.

As a soloist, Josephine Kryl appeared with the Chicago Symphony Orchestra in 1915, in recitals with Emmy Destinn in 1917, and with the Rochester Symphony in the 1930s. "Josephine Kryl has many natural gifts of temperament and talent," noted one report in 1920. "To these she adds a firmly grounded knowledge of her instrument acquired in exhaustive study which was started at an early age."

== Personal life ==
Bohumir Kryl was wealthy. In 1921, he openly offered each daughter $100,000 if they would postpone marriage until they were thirty years old, hoping the publicized offer would give them incentive to make their music careers a priority. Josephine Kryl married composer and conductor Paul Thomas White in 1922, forfeiting that reward."Paul and I are going to do a great deal in music this year," she explained to reporters. "It is silly to say one has to give up music for love." They had four daughters. Josephine Kryl White died in 1960, aged 63 years, in Rochester, New York.

Her grandson Paul Yancich is principal timpani with the Cleveland Orchestra. Another grandson, Mark Yancich, is principal timpani with the Atlanta Symphony Orchestra.
