= Bohumir Kryl =

Background information
- Born: Bohumil Krill; May 3, 1875; Hořice, Bohemia, Austria-Hungary
- Died: August 7, 1961 (aged 86) Wilmington, New York, U.S. (buried Bohemian National Cemetery, Chicago)
- Genres: Concert band
- Occupations: Soloist, bandleader, sculptor, financial executive
- Instruments: Cornet
- Years active: 1890s–1950s
- Labels: Columbia, Edison, Pathe, Victor
- Formerly of: John Philip Sousa

Bohumir Kryl (May 3, 1875 – August 7, 1961) was a Czech-American financial executive and art collector who is most famous as a cornetist, bandleader, and pioneer recording artist, for both his solo work and as a leader of popular and Bohemian bands. He was one of the major creative figures in the era of American music known as the "Golden Age of the Bands".

== Biography ==
Bohumir Kryl (originally Bohumil Krill, also Bohumír Kryl) was born on May 3, 1875, at Hořice 230, Bohemia, Austria-Hungary. He was baptized Catholic 7 days later. His first instrument was the violin, which he studied at age 10. While attending school in Hořice he was classmates with Jan Kubelík, with whom he maintained correspondence. He spent time performing both the violin and the cornet for a circus band in Prague. He also performed as an aerialist acrobat with the Rentz Circus in Germany, but an accident in 1886 ended this line of work. His father was a sculptor, and Bohumir also studied this art. He emigrated to the United States in 1889, paying the fare in part by performing with the ship's orchestra. After he moved to Chicago, English sculptor H.R. Saunders furthered his profession there. Bohumir followed Saunders to Indianapolis and was soon employed, along with his brother, as a sculptor by General Lew Wallace and also working on the Soldiers' and Sailors' Monument. Simultaneously he joined the When Clothing Company Band, playing the cornet and soloing on this instrument. Before long he was hired by John Philip Sousa, but was fired in 1898 by Sousa because he copied some of the band's music for his own personal use. He then joined Thomas Preston Brooke's Chicago Marine Band, where he spent the next two years. During this time he studied with Weldon of Chicago's Second Regiment Band. In 1901 he spent some time with Phinney's United States Band, but he joined the Duss Band permanently that year. This group was based at Madison Square Garden, at $800 per-month and became its assistant conductor in 1903. This band, led by Frederick Innes, was not as well known, but he was hired as soloist, and the heavy touring schedule and two solos per concert gained him wide exposure. His solos would result in requests for multiple encores. Studying bandleaders Creatore and Vessela, he adopted a wild "lionesque" hairstyle that became his trademark. He became acquainted with Joseph Jiran, who owned a Czechoslovak music store in Chicago. With Jiran's encouragement, he formed his own band in 1906 styled as Kryl's Bohemian Band by 1910 with the Cimera brothers. This group worked for Columbia, Victor, and Zonophone, recording works by such composers as Smetana, Dvorak, and Safranek. He earned the distinction of the first Czech musician to record on phonograph cylinders. Kryl's older brother František Xaverský (Frank) Kryl became a band-leader in Chicago. An even older brother Jan Křtitel (John) was president of the Pilsen Foundry & Iron Works there.

World War I interrupted his professional career, as he was serving in the U.S. Military. Here he attained the rank of Lieutenant and was given the title "Bandmaster of all the Military Camp Bands in the country". Immediately after the war he was touring with his bands, including many appearances on the Chautauqua circuit. This activity continued until he dismantled the band in 1931. From 1926 to 1929 he would spend winters at his mansion in Tarpon Springs, Florida. He built a bandshell on his property and would give numerous concerts each year. Through his compositions and band touring, he became a millionaire by the mid-1920s. He was a victim of an extortion attempt in 1929, but the perpetrator was caught and sentenced to prison. The Great Depression did not affect his personal affluence as much as others, as he was a bank president and a known financier in 1932. He later formed a "Women's Symphony Orchestra" that featured daughter Josephine on violin and daughter Marie on piano. He also formed and conducted the "Kryl Symphony Orchestra", which featured soloists such as Florian ZaBach and vocalist Mary McCormic. His public musical career ended in the late 1940s, when he had difficulties with the American Federation of Musicians, because although his musicians were well taken care of, he did not pay scale. His last groups played popular dance music as well as "heavier classics". Before his musical retirement, he had traveled more than one million miles and soloed more than 12,000 times. His touring included many small towns such as Albany, Oregon and Bend, Oregon, where his orchestra was the first appearance by any symphony orchestra. Aside from the United States, he toured Canada, Cuba, and Mexico with his bands and orchestras and America and Europe with his daughters. He later formed booking agency and a music bureau. An Honorary Doctor of Letters was given to him in 1957.

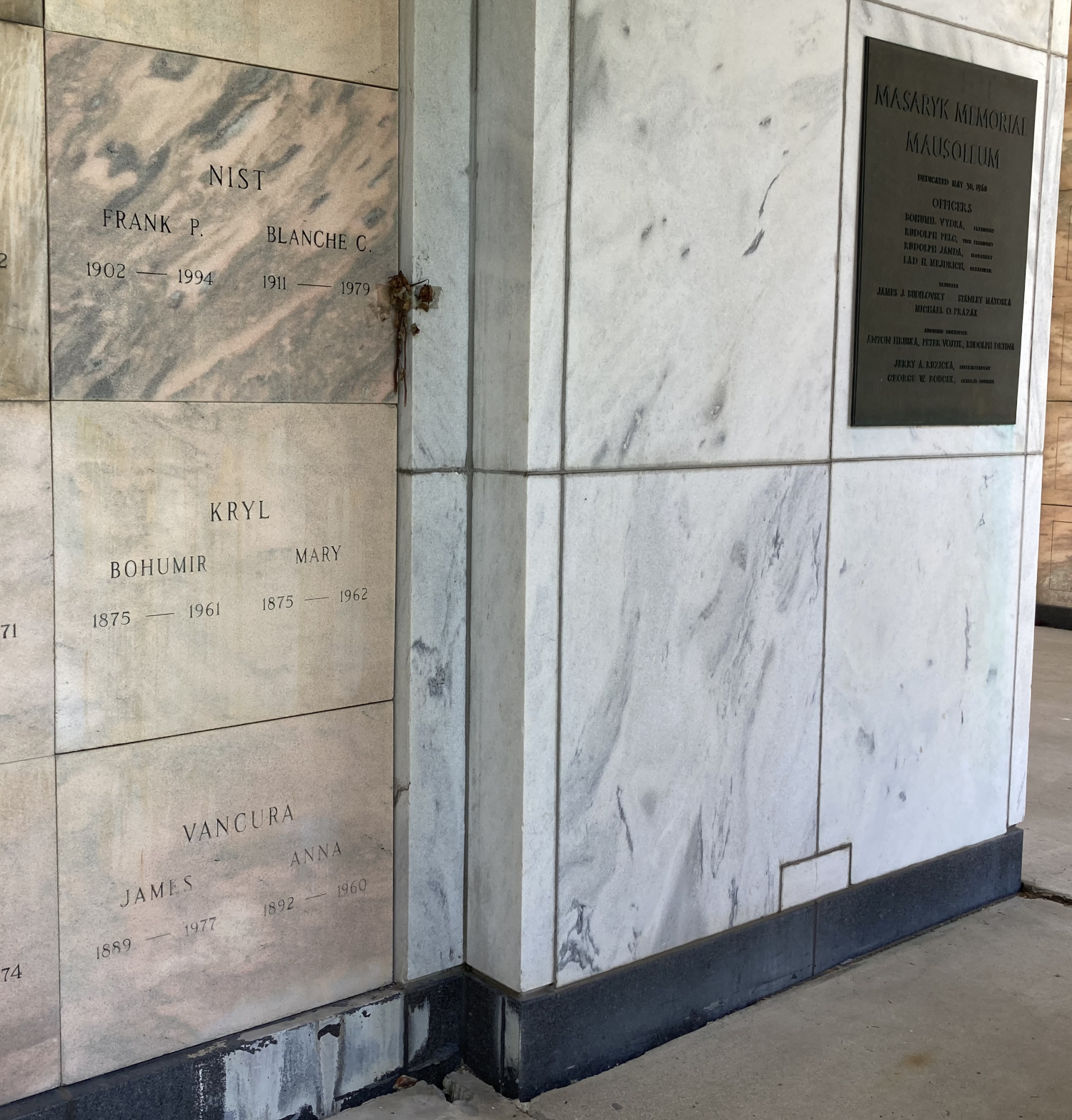
Kryl's grave at Bohemian National Cemetery

Before his death he was President of the Berwyn (Illinois) National Bank, and was also involved in several savings and loans around the Chicago area. He died at his summer home in Wilmington, New York, on August 7, 1961, leaving an estate valued at over 1 million dollars. He was interred at Masaryk Memorial Mausoleum in Bohemian National Cemetery in Chicago. His widow was Mary Jerabek Kryl, originally of Vienna.

== Musical style ==
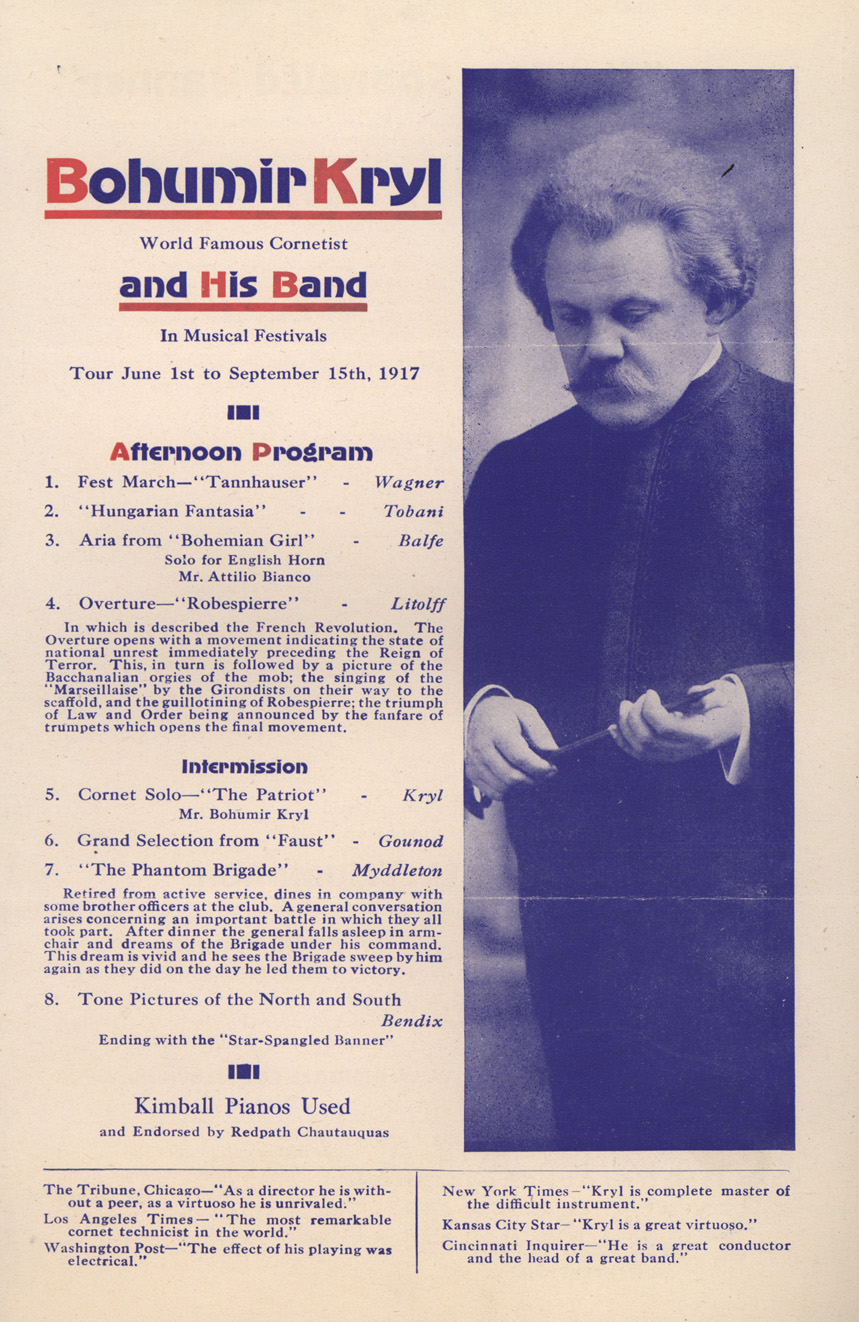
Program page from 1917 US tour

Kryl was one of the few musicians who enjoyed successful dual careers as a mainstream musical artist and as an ethnic recording artist. He transitioned from a star soloist with the Sousa outfit to a leader of ethnic Czech music, and made the transition back to the broader national audience. Because of his solo ability, he was branded "the Caruso of the cornet". He was a master of producing pedal tones and the technique of multiphonic effects. He would hold a high note for a duration of one minute. As a conductor, he was well regarded, and known for his disuse of a score and baton.

== Legacy ==
While never a jazz player, his technique was an influence on Louis Armstrong and Harry James.

Kryl became known as the "robber baron of the music field" because of his business talent and frugality. Upon not receiving his full fee, he was known to cancel concerts with audience members seated.

Kryl's two daughters became established musicians, performing with Bohumir's "Bohemian Band" as early as 1912. Kryl was insistent that his daughters become professional musicians. He offered each $100,000 if they were to remain single until the age of 30, so that their careers would not be stalled by the distractions of romance. Josephine Kryl (1897–1960), a pupil of Eugène Ysaÿe, spurned this offer in order to marry Dr. Paul White, director of the Rochester Civic Orchestra, in 1924, even though Bohumir managed to delay the wedding twice. Marie initially took the same course of action when she became engaged to Greek Count Spiro Hadji-Kyriacos. However, Marie broke her engagement and was able to collect the full amount from her father. Marie did wed at age 35 to composer and NBC conductor Michel Gusikoff. (Note: Marie's age stated as unknown in article, they assumed she had not yet reached age 30, Other articles mistakenly refer to her as being 26 years old, but in fact she was 35, having been born in 1897. See New York Times obituary. Given the number of articles that cite her age as 26, it is likely the story was largely a publicity stunt by Kryl, and her true age was disguised. It is otherwise possible the birth-date found in her obituary is incorrect.) Both daughters continued their musical careers after marriage.

A popular Conn cornet model formally named the "Conn-queror" was nicknamed the "Kryl Model."

His band furthered the career of many Czech musicians, including Vlasta Sedlovská, Jaroslav Cimera on trombone, Leo Zelenka-Lerando on harp, František Kuchynka on double-bass, J. Frnkla on French horn, Jaroslav Kocián on violin, and multi-instrumentalist Alois Bohumil Hrabák.

At one point, Kryl was considered to have one of the best private art collections in the United States. Kryl donated 16 paintings to St. Joseph's College.

== Compositions ==
- King Carnival, published 1909 by Carl Fischer Music
- Hoch Habsburg Marsch
- Josephine Waltz, published 1909 by Carl Fischer

== Partial discography ==
=== As soloist ===
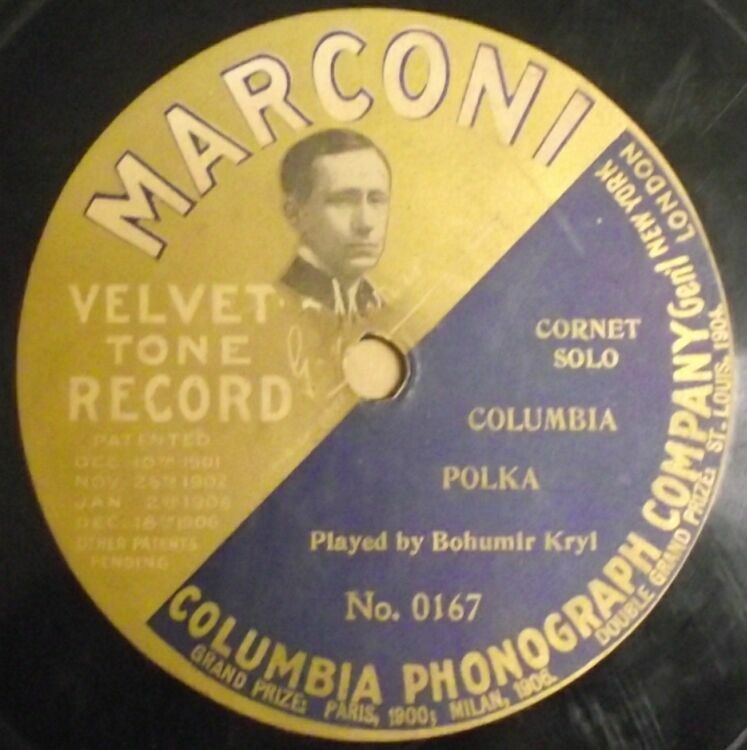
Bohumir Kryl as solo artist on Marconi Velvet Tone Record 0167

Label	Catalog #	Title	Format	Year	Notes
Columbia	1091	Alice, Where Art Thou?	7-inch 78 rpm	–	duet with Leroy Haines on trombone. take 1 issued
Columbia	1091	Alice Where Art Thou	10-inch 78 rpm	–	duet with Leroy Haines on trombone. takes 1 and 5 issued Also appeared on Oxford 1091.
Columbia	32031	Alice Where Art Thou	2-minute wax cylinder	1903	duet with Leroy Haines on trombone
Zonophone	5226	Alice Where Art Thou	7 and/or 9-inch 78 rpm	~1903	duet with Leroy Haines on trombone
Edison	50613	Aloha Oe	10-inch vertical-cut 78 rpm	~1919	Great 78 Project entry
Edison	80523	Ambassador polka	10-inch vertical-cut 78 rpm	~1917	
Edison	3833	The Ambassador polka	4-minute celluloid cylinder	1919	
Edison	8254	Answer	2-minute wax cylinder	1902	
Zonophone	5218	Answer	7 and/or 9-inch 78 rpm	~1903	
Columbia	31324	Arbucklenian Polka	2-minute wax cylinder	1901	
Edison	8327	Arbucklenian Polka	2-minute wax cylinder	1902	
Edison	822	At the Mill	4-minute wax cylinder	1911	Re-issued on Blue Amberol 1995
Zonophone	5219	Be My Own	7 and/or 9-inch 78 rpm	~1903	
Edison	3547	Ben Bolt	4-minute celluloid cylinder	1918	
Columbia	32021	Birds of the Forest	2-minute wax cylinder	1903	
Columbia	32124	Birds of the Forest	2-minute wax cylinder	1903	duet with Leroy Haines, trombone.
Columbia	1189	Birds of the Forest	10-inch 78 rpm	~February 1903	duet with Leroy Haines, trombone. also appears on Columbia A221
Edison	8253	Carnival of Venice	2-minute wax cylinder	1902	
Victor	2598	Carnival of Venice	10-inch 78 rpm	1903	euphonium solo
Columbia	32123	Carnival of Venice	2-minute cylinder	1903	Composer: Benedict
Columbia	1188	Carnival of Venice	10-inch 78 rpm	~February 1903	also appears on Columbia A213
Zonophone	5220	Carnival of Venice	7 and/or 9-inch 78 rpm	~1903	
Victor	35298	Carnival of Venice	12-inch 78 rpm	May 17, 1911	with Kryl's Bohemian Band. take 3 issued
Edison	80718	Carnival of Venice: Variations	10-inch vertical-cut 78 rpm	–	
Pathé	29216	Carnival of Venice	11.5-inch vertical-cut 78 rpm	~1918	
Edison	8609	Cary waltz	2-minute wax cylinder	1903	
Zonophone	5769	Cary waltz	7 and/or 9 inch 78 rpm	~1903	
Edison	80412	Cleopatra Polka	10-inch vertical-cut 78 rpm	~1917	
Edison	8307	Columbia	2-minute wax cylinder	1903	
Zonophone	5616A	Columbia, Fantasia Polka	10-inch 78 rpm	–	Also released on Oxford 5616A
Columbia	1081	Columbia Polka	10-inch 78 rpm	~1903	also appears on Columbia A226 and Marconi 167
Zonophone	5221	Columbian Fantasie	7 and/or 9-inch 78 rpm	~1903	
Victor	63578B	Děvčátko darovalo mi prstýnek	10-inch 78 rpm	May 16, 1911	ethnic series. with Kryl's Bohemian Band. take 2 issued
Zonophone	5221	Down Deep Within the Cellar	7 and/or 9-inch 78 rpm	~1903	
Columbia	32130	Du, Du with Variations	2-minute cylinder	1903	Composer: Levy
Columbia	1204	Du Du with Variations	7-inch 78 rpm	-	
Victor	2595	Du, Du	10-inch 78 rpm	1903	euphonium solo
Zonophone	613	Du, Du, with variations	10-inch 78 rpm	~1906	
U.S. Everlasting	1305	Du, Du	2-minute celluloid cylinder	1909	
Columbia	32029	Facilita	2-minute cylinder	1903	Composer: Hartmann
Columbia	1089	Facilita	7-inch 78 rpm	–	take 3 issued
Columbia	31326	Fantaisie, from "Fra Diavolo"	2-minute cylinder	1901	Composer: Auber
Zonophone	638	Gobble Duet from "The Mascot"	10-inch 78 rpm	–	duet with Jaroslav Cimero, trombone. Also released on Oxford 5346B
Victor	35195	Grand trio (Attila. Te sol quest'anima) (Verdi)	12-inch 78 rpm	May 16, 1911	take 1 issued. Also on Victor 68316
Zonophone	5227	Il Trovatore: Miserere	7 and/or 9-inch 78 rpm	~1903	duet with Leroy Haines, trombone
Columbia	1094	Il Trovatore: Miserere	10-inch 78 rpm	~Nov. 1902	duet with Leroy Haines, also appears on Columbia A187, Oxford 1094 and Silvertone 1094
Columbia	32034	Il Trovatore: Miserere	2-minute cylinder	1903	
Edison	8308	Inflamatus from Stabat Mater	2-minute wax cylinder	1903	
Columbia	1090	Im Reize Von 16 Jahren	7-inch 78 rpm	~Nov. 1902	
Zonophone	5223	Inflamatus from Stabat Mater	7 and/or 9-inch 78 rpm	~1903	
Pathé	29216B	Irish Fantasies medley	11.5-inch vertical-cut 78 rpm	~1918	
Pathé	20381	Killarney	10-inch 78 rpm	–	
Victor	2596	King Carnival	10-inch 78 rpm	1903	on euphonium
Edison	8663	King Carnival polka	2-minute wax cylinder	1903	
Edison	8745	Kryl's favorite	2-minute wax cylinder	1904	
Columbia	1199	Last Rose of Summer	7-inch 78 rpm	-	
Columbia	1199	Last Rose of Summer	10-inch 78 rpm	–	also issued (take 5) on Columbia A187, Oxford 1199, and Aretino D621
Edison	9860	Lvi silon	4-minute celluloid cylinder	1913	Bohemian series
Zonophone	5616B	Miserere	10-inch 78 rpm	–	
Columbia	31327	My Lodging Is on the Cold Ground	2-minute cylinder	1901	Title originally released by W. S. Mygrants
Columbia	31325	My Pretty Jane	2-minute cylinder	1901	Composers: Fitzball - Bishop. Title originally released by W. S. Mygrants
Edison	9861	Na prej	4-minute celluloid cylinder	1913	Bohemian series
Edison	8482	National fantasia	2-minute wax cylinder	1903	
Edison	9005	O Promise Me	2-minute wax cylinder	1905	
Zonophone	89	Oh, How Delightful	10-inch 78 rpm	~1905	Also released on Oxford 89
Columbia	31313	One I Love, Two I Love	2-minute cylinder	1901	
Edison	9812	Orly Polskie	4-minute wax cylinder	–	Bohemian series, Re-issued on Blue Amberol 9862
Zonophone	5228	The Palms	7 and/or 9-inch 78 rpm	~1903	duet with Leroy Haines, trombone
Edison	9807	Pode mlejnem	4-minute wax cylinder	–	Bohemian series, Re-issued on Blue Amberol 9857
Edison	9813	Povidky s. Vidensky lesu	4-minute wax cylinder	–	Bohemian series, Re-issued on Blue Amberol 9863
Edison	790	Praise Ye	4-minute wax cylinder	–	Re-issued on Blue Amberol 2054
Berliner	03451	Robin Adair	7-inch 78 rpm	March 1899	
Victor	35239	Rigoletto quartet	12-inch 78 rpm	May 18, 1911	"Brass Quartet." take 1 issued. Also on Victor 68346
Edison	8208	Russian fantasia	2-minute wax cylinder	1902	
Columbia	32023	Russian Fantasia	2-minute cylinder	1903	Composer: Portnoff
Zonophone	5225	Russian Fantasie	7 and/or 9-inch 78 rpm	~1903	
Victor	2597	Serenade Pierne	10-inch 78 rpm	1903	euphonium solo
Columbia	32120	Short and Sweet Polka	2-minute cylinder	–	duet with Leroy Haines, trombone
Columbia	1185	Short and Sweet Polka	10-inch 78 rpm	–	duet with Leroy Haines, trombone
Zonophone	90	Short and Sweet Polka	10-inch 78 rpm	~1905	duet with Leroy Haines, trombone. Also released on Zonophone 5346A
Edison	8418	Sing, Smile, Slumber	2-minute wax cylinder	1903	
Zonophone	111	Sing, Smile, Slumber	10-inch 78 rpm	~1905	Also released on Oxford 111
Victor	68338	Sweet Is the Dream	12-inch 78 rpm	May 17, 1911	with Jaroslav Cimera, trombone. Ethnic series. take 2 issued
Columbia	32030	Sweet Sixteen Waltz	2-minute cylinder	1903	Composer: Aronson
Edison	8811	Sweet Sixteen waltz	2-minute wax cylinder	1904	
Zonophone	P-5842	Sweet Sixteen	7-inch 78 rpm	-	
Columbia	32032	Theresa Polka	2-minute cylinder	1903	Composer: Waldron
Columbia	32035	Tyroleans, The	2-minute cylinder	1903	Composer: J. F. Frøhlich
Zonophone	5229	Tyroleans	7 and/or 9-inch 78 rpm	~1903	duet with Leroy Haines, trombone
Columbia	32033	Utility polka	2-minute wax cylinder	1903	duet with Leroy Haines, trombone
Zonophone	5230	Utility polka	7 and/or 9-inch 78 rpm	~1903	duet with Leroy Haines, trombone
Edison	80578	Where the River Shannon Flows	10-inch vertical-cut 78 rpm	–	
Pathé	20381	Where the River Shannon Flows	10-inch 78 rpm	–	
Edison	9808	Zeleny hajove	4-minute wax cylinder	–	Bohemian series, Re-issued on Blue Amberol 9858

=== As leader ===
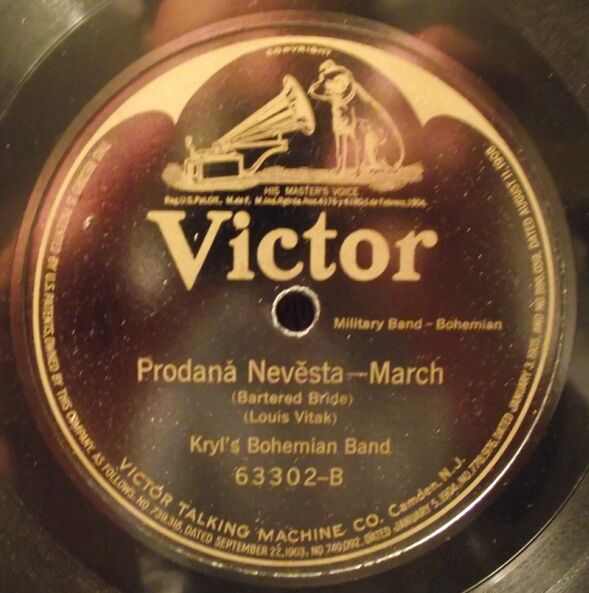
Kryl's Bohemian Band on Victor 63302 side B

Label	Catalog #	Title	Format	Year	Notes
Victor	68338	Bartered bride: Selection (Bedřich Smetana)	12-inch 78 rpm	May 18, 1911	
Victor	68335	Bartered bride: Sextette	12-inch 78 rpm	May 16, 1911	ethnic series. take 2 issued. Also on Gramophone 2–070003.
Victor	16891	Dance of the Wood Nymphs	10-inch 78 rpm	May 16, 1911	take 1 issued. Also on Victor 63472.
Victor	35195	Grand trio (Attila. Te sol quest'anima) (Verdi)	12-inch 78 rpm	May 16, 1911	"Brass trio with band" take 1 issued. Also on Victor 68316.
Victor	63578A	Kukačka valčik (Cuckoo waltz) (Antonín Dvořák)	10-inch 78 rpm	May 19, 1911	ethnic series. take 2 issued.
Victor	63645	Láska a život ve Vídni	10-inch 78 rpm	May 15, 1911	ethnic series. take 2 issued. Also on Gramophone 7–70013.
Victor	68335	Libuše overture	12-inch 78 rpm	May 19, 1911	ethnic series. take 1 issued. Also on Gramophone 2–070004.
Victor	63303B	Lvi silou pochod	10-inch 78 rpm	May 15, 1911	ethnic series. take 1 issued. Also on Gramophone 7–70001.
Victor	35298	Marche fantastique	12-inch 78 rpm	May 19, 1911	take 1 issued. Also on Gramophone 0427.
Victor	35258	Marche Indienne	12-inch 78 rpm	May 18, 1911	take 2 issued. Also on Gramophone 0387.
Victor	63782B	Na prej	10-inch 78 rpm	May 15, 1911	ethnic series. take 2 issued. Also on Gramophone 7–70008.
Victor	63302A	Národin kalop	10-inch 78 rpm	May 15, 1911	ethnic series. take 1 issued. Also on Gramophone 7–70011.
Victor	68296	Pepe polka	12-inch 78 rpm	May 16, 1911	ethnic series. take 2 issued. Also on Gramophone 2–070001.
Victor	63303A	Pode m'lejnem pochod	10-inch 78 rpm	May 15, 1911	ethnic series. take 2 issued. Also on Gramophone 7–70010.
Victor	63302B	Prodaná nevěsta: March	10-inch 78 rpm	May 15, 1911	ethnic series. take 2 issued. Also on Gramophone 7-7009*.
Victor	31832	Sakuntala overture (Carl Goldmark)	12-inch 78 rpm	May 16, 1911	take 2 issued.
Victor	68296	Směs českých písní	12-inch 78 rpm	May 17, 1911	ethnic series. take 1 issued.
Victor	63645	Sokol's triumphal march	10-inch 78 rpm	May 15, 1911	ethnic series. take 2 issued. Also on Gramophone 7–70006.
Victor	63782A	Zelený hájové march	10-inch 78 rpm	May 17, 1911	ethnic series. take 1 issued.
