= Hořice =

- Town
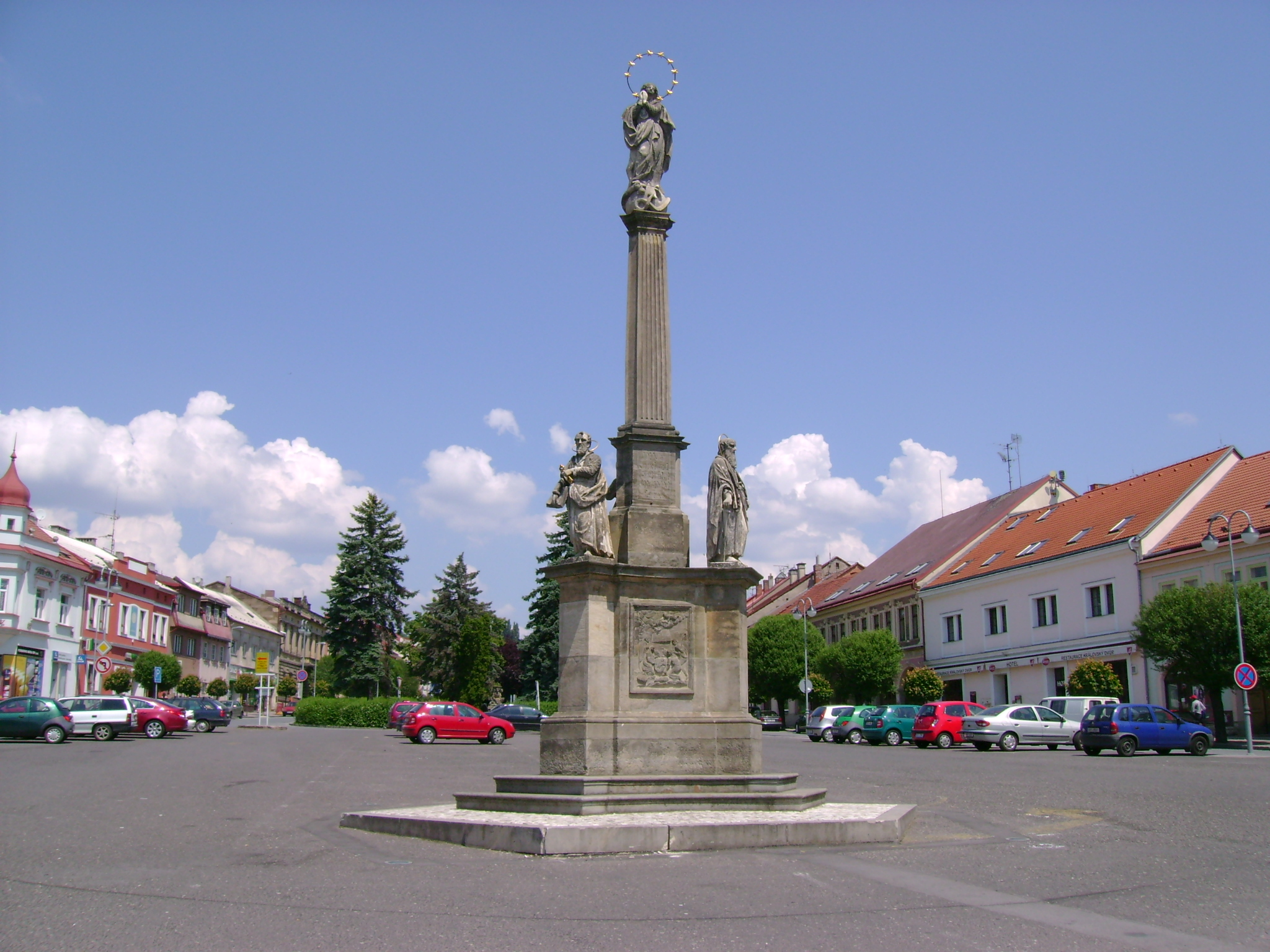
- The square Náměstí Jiřího z Poděbrad

- Flag Coat of arms

- Location in the Czech Republic
- Coordinates: 50°22′3″N 15°37′53″E
- Country: Czech Republic
- Region: Hradec Králové
- District: Jičín
- First mentioned: 1143

Government
  - Mayor: Martin Pour

Area
  - Total: 21.43 km^{2} (8.27 sq mi)
- Elevation: 311 m (1,020 ft)

Population (2026-01-01)
  - Total: 8,427
  - Density: 393.2/km^{2} (1,018/sq mi)
- Time zone: UTC+1 (CET)
  - Summer (DST): UTC+2 (CEST)
- Postal code: 508 01
- Website: www.horice.org

Hořice (Czech pronunciation: [ˈɦor̝ɪtsɛ]; German: Horschitz) is a town in Jičín District in the Hradec Králové Region of the Czech Republic. It has about 8,400 inhabitants. The town is located on the border between the Jičín Uplands and East Elbe Table, near the Bystřice River.

The history of Hořice is connected to the stone mining in the area, which caused its economic growth. The town is known for its secondary school of applied arts and for the production of the traditional confectionery Hořické trubičky.

== Administrative division ==
Hořice consists of seven municipal parts (in brackets population according to the 2021 census):

- Hořice (7,576)
- Březovice (92)
- Chlum (124)
- Chvalina (63)
- Doubrava (56)
- Libonice (274)
- Svatogothardská Lhota (0)

== Etymology ==
The name is probably derived from the surname Hora, meaning "the village of Hora's people", but it could be also derived from the word hořice, which is an Old Czech diminutive form of hora (i.e. 'mountain').

== Geography ==
Hořice is located about 21 kilometres (13 mi) southeast of Jičín and 21 km (13 mi) northwest of Hradec Králové. It lies on the border between a hilly landscape of the Jičín Uplands in the north, and a flat landscape of the East Elbe Table in the south. The highest point is at 440 m (1,440 ft) above sea level. The Bystřice River flows through the eastern part of Hořice's territory.

== History ==
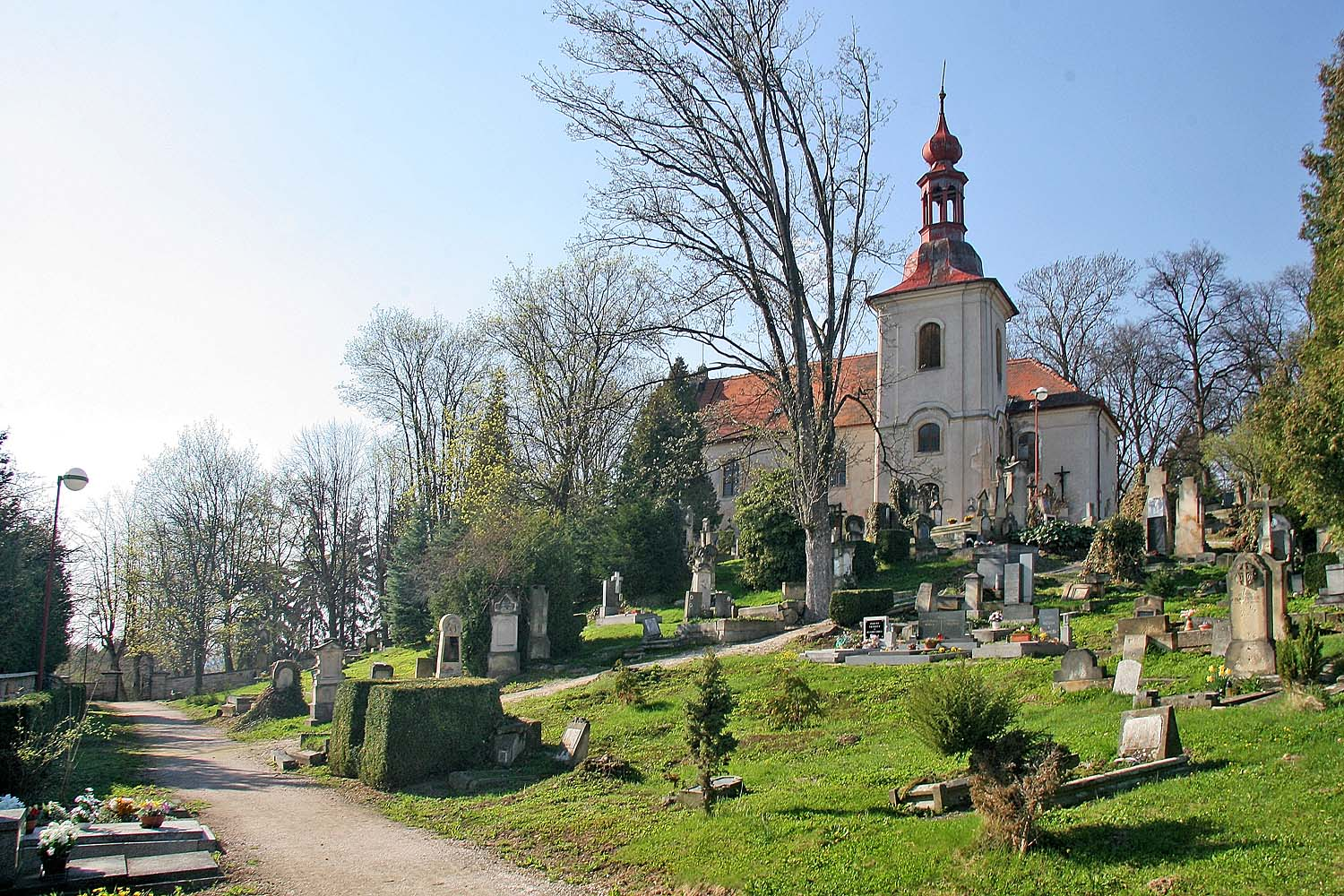
Church of Saint Gotthard

The first written mention of Hořice is from 1143 in the foundation deed of the Strahov Monastery. It was founded on a hill later named Gothard, which was named after the Church of Saint Gotthard founded here in the 12th century. In the 13th century, the settlement was moved to strategically more advantageous place below the hill. In 1365, it was first documented as a market town.

In 1423, Gothard hill was the site of a battle of the Hussite Wars. During the rule of the Smiřický noble family from the mid-16th century to the early 17th century, the town developed rapidly.

In 1846, the town square was damaged by a large fire, which destroyed most of the wooden houses. The wooden buildings were replaced by stone houses, which initiated stone quarrying in many local quarries. This has led to economic development and Hořice turned into a real town. Several factories were established, especially by Jewish entrepreneurs, and sandstone quarrying also developed. In 1882, the railway was built and connected the town with Hradec Králové and Jičín.

== Demographics ==
Historical population

Year	Pop.	±%
1869	6,710	—
1880	7,028	+4.7%
1890	7,894	+12.3%
1900	8,814	+11.7%
1910	9,897	+12.3%

Year	Pop.	±%
1921	9,787	−1.1%
1930	9,421	−3.7%
1950	7,700	−18.3%
1961	7,754	+0.7%
1970	8,090	+4.3%

Year	Pop.	±%
1980	9,251	+14.4%
1991	9,282	+0.3%
2001	9,091	−2.1%
2011	8,783	−3.4%
2021	8,185	−6.8%

Source: Censuses

== Economy ==
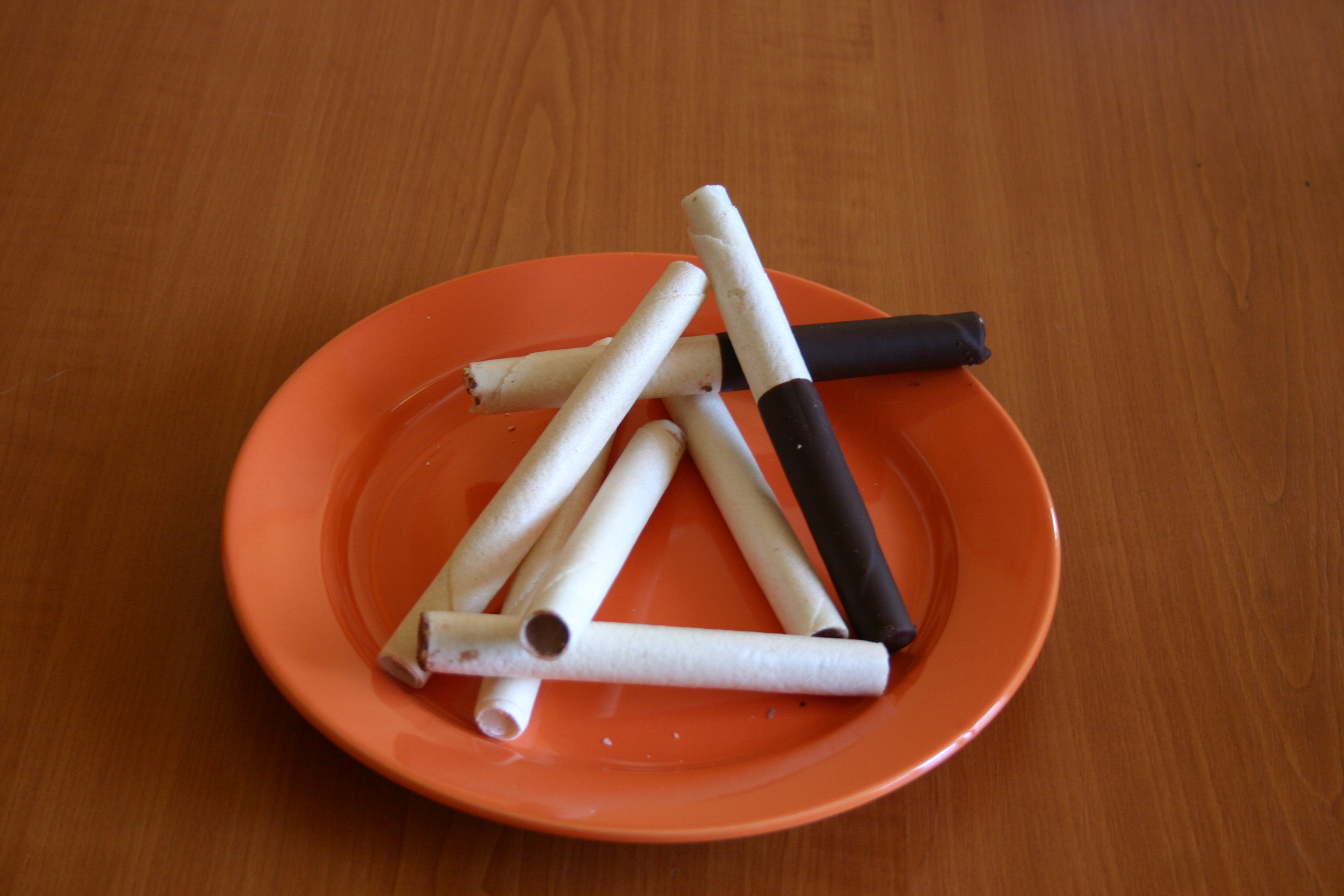
Hořické trubičky

The town is known for its production of Hořické trubičky ('Hořice rolls'), which is a traditional confectionery. The production started here in 1812. The manufactory is a protected geographical indication by the European Union.

== Transport ==
The I/35 road (the section from Hradec Králové to Jičín, part of the European route E442) runs next to the town.

Hořice is located on the railway line Hradec Králové–Turnov.

== Education ==
Hořice is known for its secondary school of applied arts. It was founded in 1884. It is a prestigious school that specialises primarily in working with stone. It is the alma mater of many prominent Czech sculptors and artists, but also offers technical fields dealing with stone mining and geology.

== Sights ==
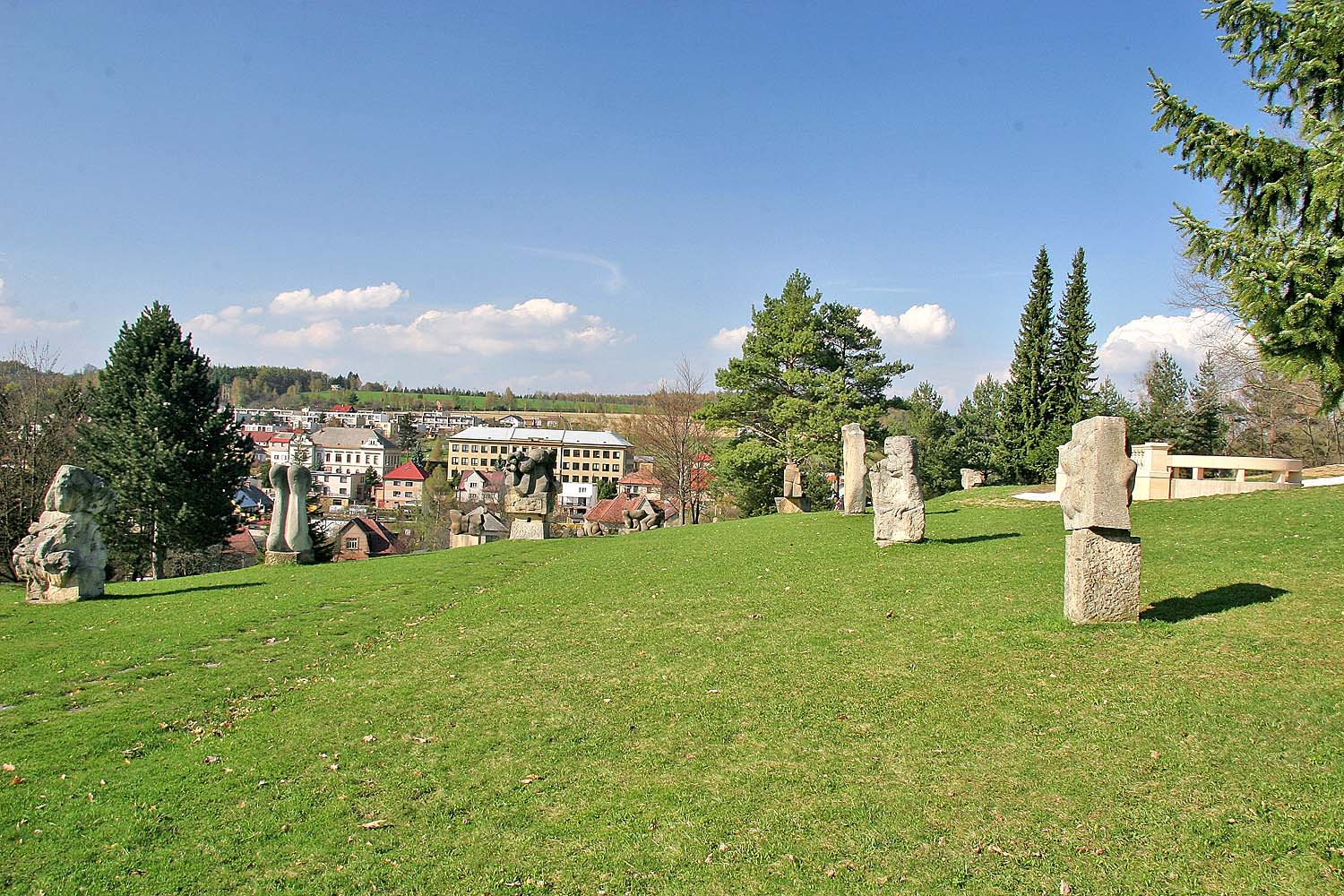
Sculpture park

Among the most valuable buildings is the Church of the Nativity of the Virgin Mary. It was built in the Baroque style by plans of Kilian Ignaz Dientzenhofer in 1738–1748. The Hořice Castle was created in the Baroque style in the mid-18th century by reconstruction of a Gothic fortress from 14th–15th century.

On the Gothard hill, there is the Church of Saint Gotthard. The original Romanesque cemetery church was rebuilt in the Baroque style in 1783. On the hill there are also remains of an old fortress with the first-ever Czech sculpture of Jan Žižka, former Jewish cemetery, and a sculpture park.

Among the main landmarks of Hořice is the Masaryk Independence Tower, located on the northern edge of the town. It is a place of remembrance and a memorial to the victims of both World Wars and the anti-communist resistance. It was built in 1926–1938 according to the design by František Blažek. The monument's tower was originally supposed to measure 40 metres (130 ft), but it remained unfinished due to the advent of World War II and was instead covered by an observatory dome. There is a small museum inside.

== Notable people ==
- Iacob Felix (1832–1905), Jewish doctor
- Fritz Mauthner (1849–1923), Jewish writer and philosopher
- Bohumir Kryl (1875–1961), Czech-American cornetist, bandleader and art collector
- Karel Vik (1883–1964), painter
- Irene Kirpal (1886–1977), politician
- Josef Matoušek (1906–1939), historian
- Stanislav Fišer (1931–2022), actor and voice actor
- Jaroslava Jehličková (born 1942), athlete

== Twin towns – sister cities ==
Hořice is twinned with:

- Jabłonka, Poland
- Kerepes, Hungary
- Strzegom, Poland
- Trstená, Slovakia
