= Karel Vik =

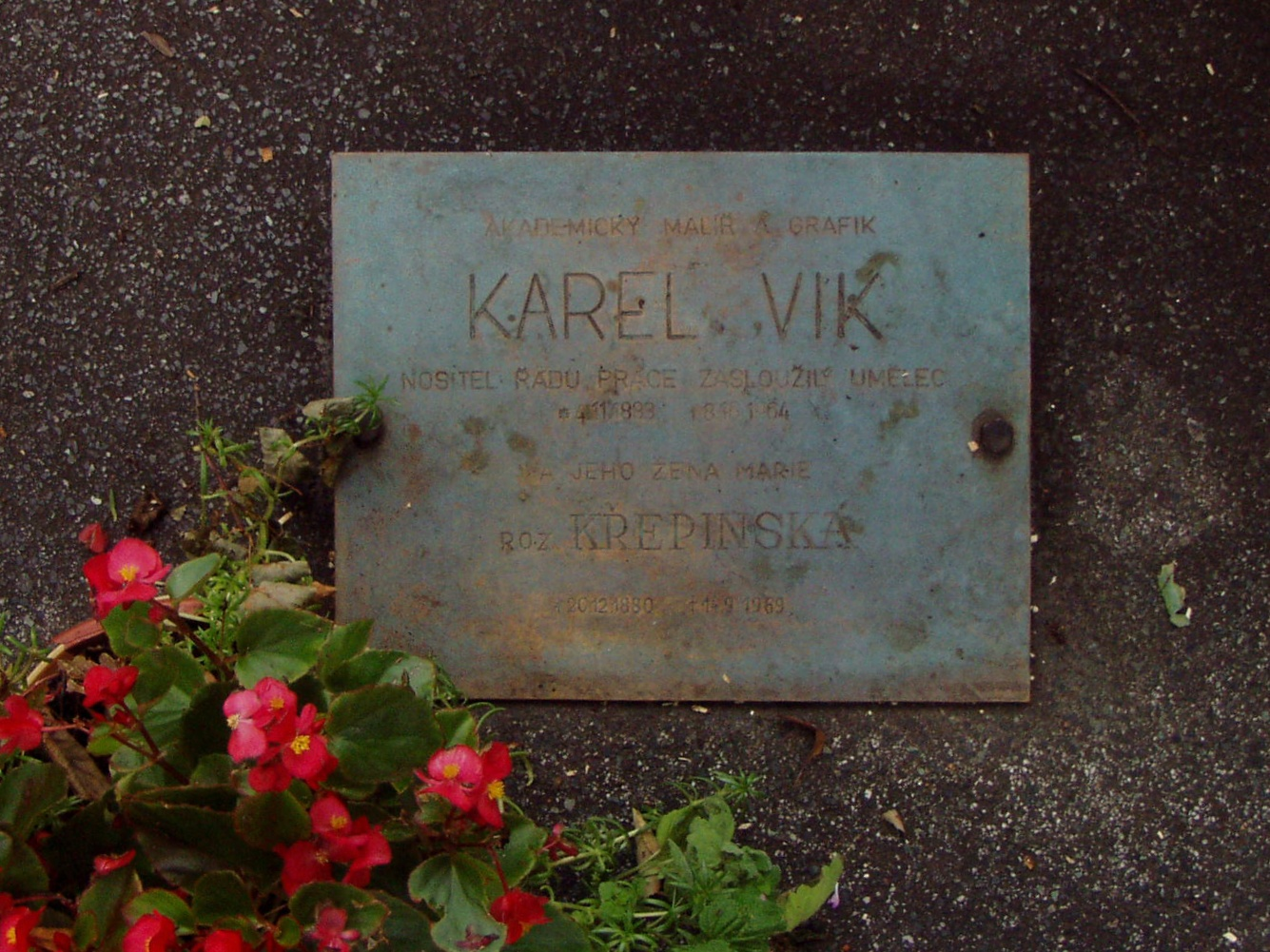
Vik's grave

Karel Vik (4 November 1883 – 8 October 1964) was a Czech painter, wood engraver and illustrator.

== Biography ==
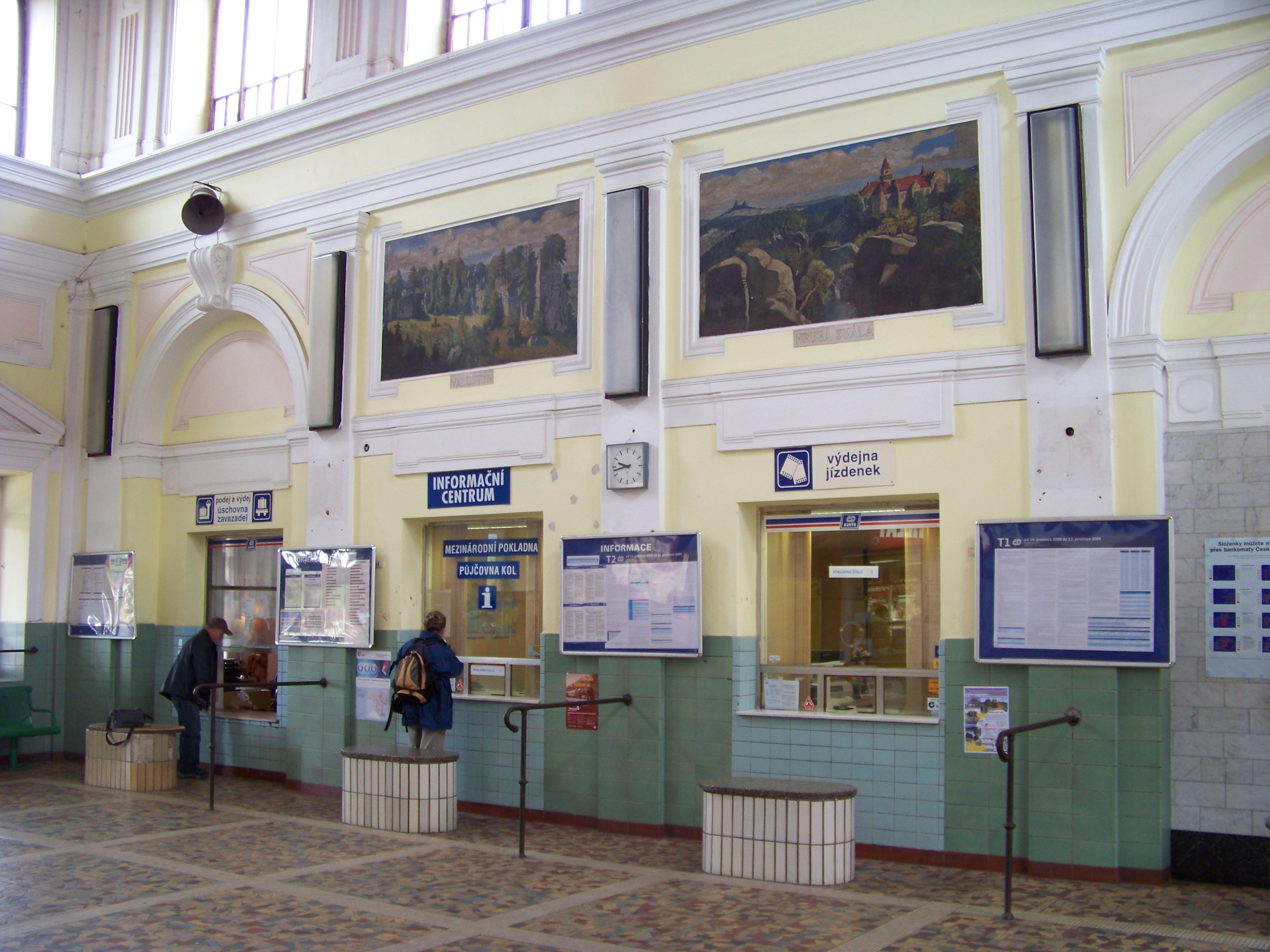
Vik's paintings hanging in the train station in Turnov, Czech Republic

Vik was born on 4 November 1883 in Hořice and died on 8 October 1964 in Turnov. His works are held by museums across Europe.

Karel Vik was a Czech visual artist who was born in 1883. Many works by the artist have been sold at auction, including 'House by the Golden Well' sold at Dorotheum, Prague 'Fine Art - Prague' in 2015. The artist died in 1964.
