= Romanization of Arabic =

Representation of Arabic in Latin script

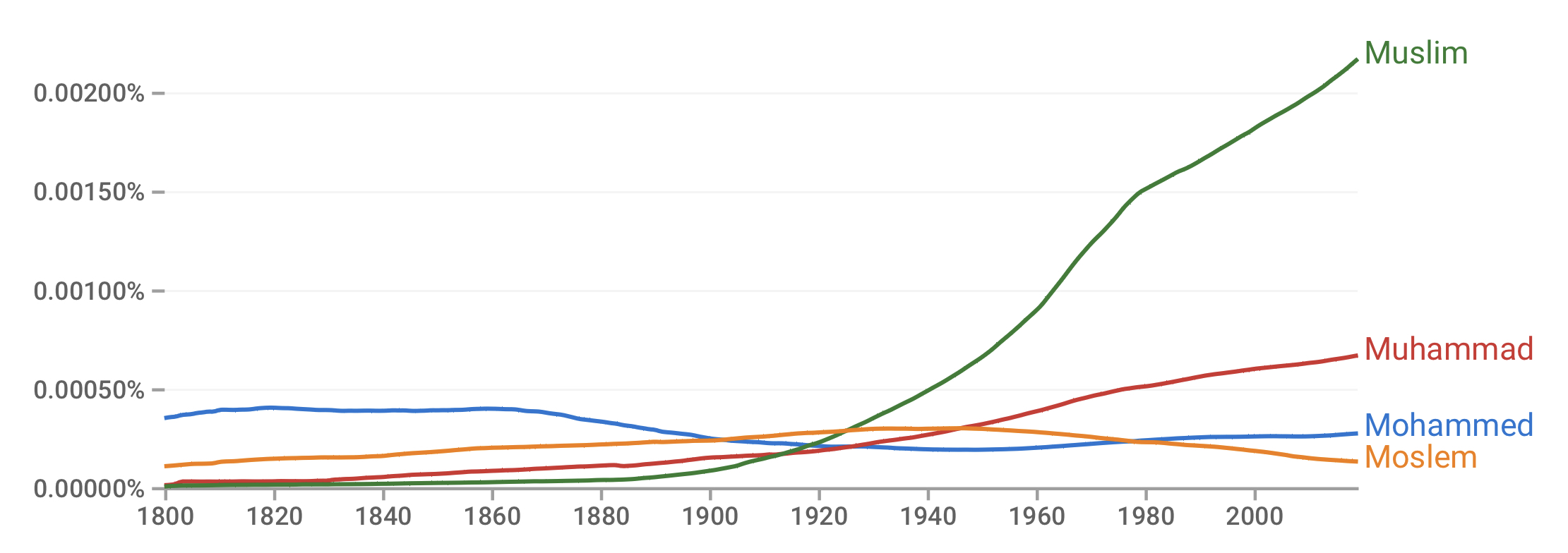
Google Ngrams chart showing the changing English romanization of the Arabic short vowels between the 19th and 20th centuries, using the words Muslim and Muhammad as examples

The romanization of Arabic is the systematic rendering of written and spoken Arabic in the Latin script. Romanized Arabic is used for various purposes, among them transcription of names and titles, cataloging Arabic language works, language education when used instead of or alongside the Arabic script, and representation of the language in scientific publications by linguists. These formal systems, which often make use of diacritics and non-standard Latin characters, are used in academic settings for the benefit of non-speakers, contrasting with informal means of written communication used by speakers such as the Latin-based Arabic chat alphabet.

Arabic transcription methods can be divided into ad hoc and systematic types. Ad hoc transcription is common in everyday uses such as loanwords and names of people and places, as well as electronic communication in Arabic using Latin script. It does not use a fixed system, borrowing inconsistent orthographic rules from the host language (e.g. representing ش as sh in English, ch in French, or sch in German) and usually omitting diacritics. Ad hoc forms are thus often ambiguous and vary widely: a well-known example is that of the name Muammar Gaddafi (معمر القذافي) – a 1986 column by The Straight Dope lists 32 spellings known from the US Library of Congress, while ABC identified 112 possible spellings – examples include common variants such as Qaddafi, Qadhafi and Gadhafi, or rarely used systematic romanizations such as Qaḏḏāfī (DIN, Wehr, ISO) or Qadhdhāfī (ALA-LC). Systematic transcription provides an unambiguous mapping, often with diacritics, to permit precise reconstruction of the original.

Early Arabic–European dictionaries typically used vocalized Arabic script without transcription (Jacobus Golius, 1653; Georg Freytag, 1837), but some exceptions such as Franciscus a Mesgnien Meninski (1780) provided a system - in the latter, transcription was likely needed because Turkish pronunciation was not always clear from Arabic script. In the 19th century, scholarly study of linguistics generated multiple transcription systems and “universal alphabets”, but Arabic adoption was slow; journals either printed Arabic directly or used ad hoc or journal-specific schemes. A common alphabet was presented in 1895 at the 10th International Congress of Orientalists, yet practices remained fluid into the 20th century despite established features (dotted emphatic consonants; macrons/circumflexes for long vowels). The most recent international standardization attempt was made in 1935 at the 19th International Congress of Orientalists, which adopted the Deutsche Morgenländische Gesellschaft (DMG) system.

Today, three main scientific systems are now standard: the ALA-LC system, the DMG system, and the French IGN system. Additional standards (e.g. DIN 31635, ISO 233, UN geographic system) exist but are little used, hard to access, or closely align with the main systems. The Encyclopaedia of Islam uses its own 19th-century-based system.

Different systems and strategies have been developed to address specific problems inherent in rendering various Arabic varieties in the Latin script. Examples of such problems are the symbols for Arabic phonemes that do not exist in English or other European languages; the means of representing the Arabic definite article, which is always spelled the same way in written Arabic but has numerous pronunciations in the spoken language depending on context; and the representation of short vowels (usually i u or e o, accounting for variations such as Muslim and Moslem or Mohammed, Muhammad and Mohamed).

== Method ==
Romanization is often termed "transliteration", but this is not technically correct (especially for abjads). Transliteration is the direct representation of foreign letters using Latin symbols, while most systems for romanizing Arabic are actually transcription systems, which represent the sound of the language, since short vowels and geminate consonants, for example, do not usually appear in Arabic writing. As an example, the following rendering "munāẓaratu l-ḥurūfi l-ʿarabiyyah" of Arabic: مناظرة الحروف العربية is a transcription, indicating the pronunciation; an example of transliteration would be mnaẓrḧ alḥrwf alʻrbyḧ.

== Romanization standards and systems ==
=== Early Romanization systems ===
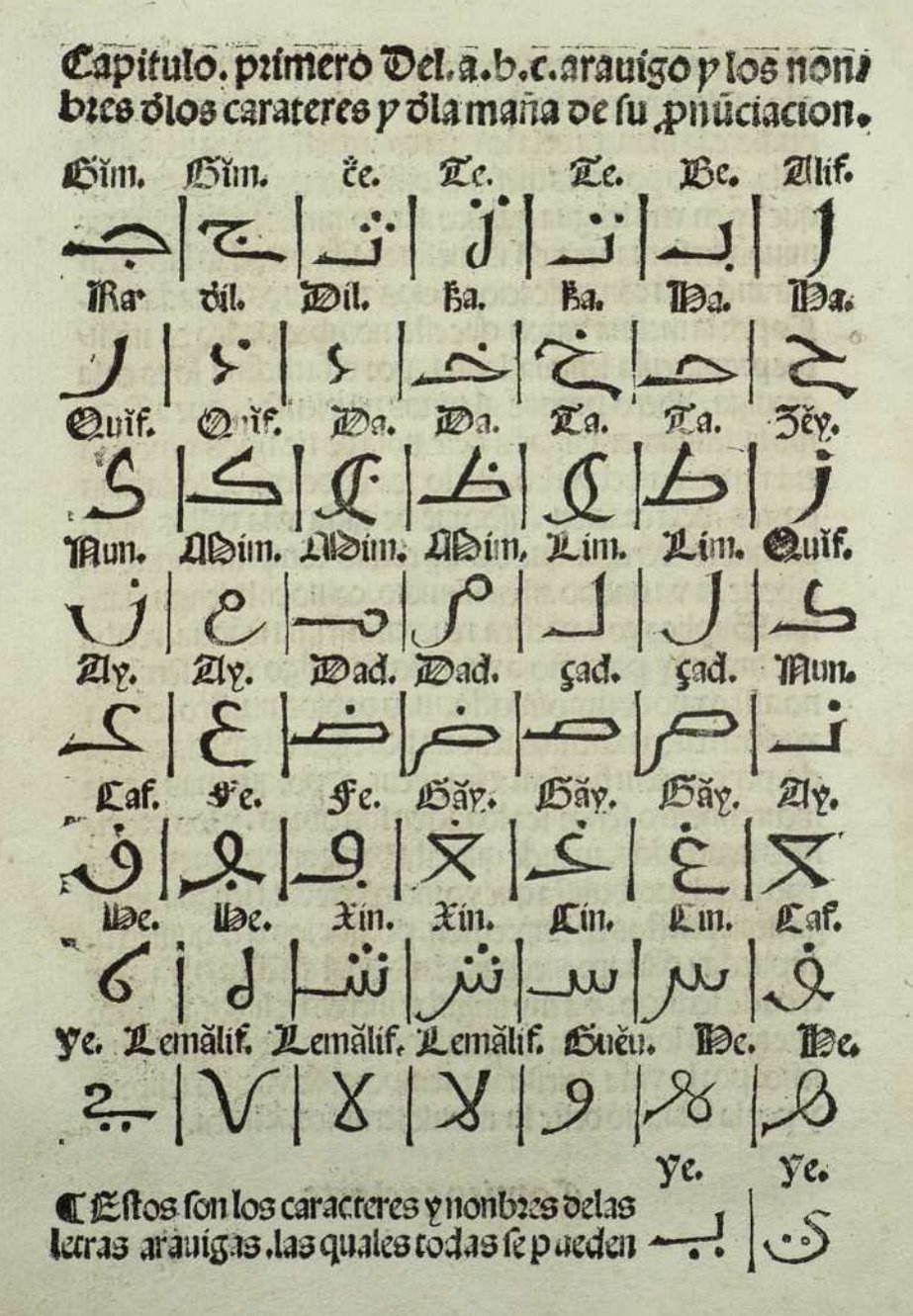
De Alcalá's work has been called the "first Western system of Arabic scientific transcription".

Early Romanization of the Arabic language was variable across the most widely read bilingual Arabic-European dictionaries of the 17–19th centuries:

- 1505: Pedro de Alcalá, Vocabulista. A Spanish–Arabic glossary using a systematic transcription.
- 1612: Valentin Schindler, Lexicon Pentaglotton: Hebraicum, Chaldicum, Syriacum, Talmudico-Rabbinicum, et Arabicum. Arabic lemmas were printed in Hebrew characters.
- 1613: Franciscus Raphelengius, Lexicon Arabicum, Leiden. The first printed dictionary of the Arabic language in Arabic characters.
- 1653: Jacobus Golius, Lexicon Arabico-Latinum, Leiden. The dominant Arabic dictionary in Europe for almost two centuries.
- 1830–1837: Georg Freytag, Lexicon Arabico-Latinum, praesertim ex Djeuharii Firuzubadiique et aliorum libris confectum I–IV, Halle
- 1863–1893: Edward William Lane, Arabic–English Lexicon, 8 vols, London-Edinburgh. Highly influential, but incomplete (stops at Kaf)

=== 19th and 20th century standardization ===
1895 Report of the 10th International Congress of Orientalists' Transliteration Committee on Arabic Alphabets

In 1889, the Damascene scholar Elias al-Qudsi published in Beirut-based magazine al-Muqtataf a method for writing Arabic words and names in the Latin script, using diacritics. In the same year, the editors of al-Muqtataf, Yaqub Sarruf and Faris Nimr, developed a different model for writing Arabic in Latin letters, partly in response to al-Qudsi’s system.

In 1892, Egyptian Minister of Education Ahmad Zaki Pasha proposed creating a commission to standardise the rendering of Arabic words in English and French, and French words in Arabic, because of inconsistency in official correspondence. Zaki Pasha provided examples from the official government bulletin, the Arabic-French bilingual Al-Waqa'i' al-Misriyya, in which the French "Capitaine" was rendered as both "qabudān" and "qabṭān", and the French word "poste" was rendered as both "al-busta" and "al-busṭa".

In 1890, orientalist scholar Monier Monier-Williams published a "Proposal for Promoting a Uniform International Method of Transliteration" in the Journal of the Royal Asiatic Society, with respect to Indian and Arabic scripts. With respect to Arabic he noted:

…evidently much disagreement still prevails in regard to certain Arabic symbols, as may be seen by comparing Professor Nöldeke's method with that of our scholars… As to the names of persons occurring in Indian languages… that of the Arabian prophet (Muhammad or Mohammed or Mohammed or commonly Mahomed, Mahomet), and names connected with him (Ahmad or Ahmed? Muslim or Moslem? Kurăn or Qurăn or commonly Koran? etc.).

The international committee suggested by Monier-Williams was formed. In 1895, the report of the 10th International Congress of Orientalists was published. It sought to establish a generally accepted system for the transliteration of both the Arabic and Sanskrit alphabets. In recommending the adoption of the report, the Council of the Royal Asiatic Society wrote:

The Council is of opinion that it is advisable to take this opportunity of recommending the system thus placed before the world. Much care and pains have been taken over the subject, and there does not seem any probability of further steps being taken, at all events for some years to come… the Council… earnestly recommends all connected with this country who are engaged in Oriental studies to set aside their own individual feelings and predilections, and, as far as possible, to employ this method of transliteration, in order that the very great benefit of a uniform system may be gradually adopted, and Oriental studies may thereby be facilitated.

In 1915, Egyptian magazine al-Hilal reported criticism by the American orientalist William H. Worrell of inconsistent pronunciation of Latin-script street signs, citing the Arabic word for “street”, shāriʿ, which appeared as "chareh", and thus pronounced as "chary," "shary," or "kary" respectively by English, French, and Italian readers. al-Hilal published a chart of what they described as a common transliteration method, including Arabic diacritics, which was similar to the 1895 International Congress of Orientalists version. In the same year, the British established a government commission in Egypt to revise and standardise the transliteration of Arabic terms in English, particularly for maps and official reports – the commission had been primarily concerned with toponyms, whereby "a Frenchman would write a name down in one way, an Englishman in another, and Italian or German according to his own mother tongue and so on".

=== Modern systems: mixed digraphic and diacritical ===
- BGN/PCGN romanization (1956).
- UNGEGN (1972). United Nations Group of Experts on Geographical Names, or "Variant A of the Amended Beirut System". Adopted from BGN/PCGN.
  - IGN System 1973 or "Variant B of the Amended Beirut System", that conforms to the French orthography and is preferred to the Variant A in French-speaking countries as in Maghreb and Lebanon.
  - ADEGN romanization (2007) is different from UNGEGN in two ways: (1) ظ is d͟h instead of z̧; (2) the cedilla is replaced by a sub-macron (_) in all the characters with the cedilla.
- ALA-LC (first published 1991), from the American Library Association and the Library of Congress. This romanization is close to the romanization of the Deutsche Morgenländische Gesellschaft and Hans Wehr, which is used internationally in scientific publications by Arabists.
  - IJMES, used by International Journal of Middle East Studies, very similar to ALA-LC.
  - EI, Encyclopaedia of Islam (1st ed., 1913–1938; 2nd ed., 1960–2005).

=== Fully diacritical ===
- DMG (Deutsche Morgenländische Gesellschaft, 1935), adopted at the 19th International Congress of Orientalists in Rome.
  - DIN 31635 (1982), developed by the German Institute for Standardization (Deutsches Institut für Normung).
  - Hans Wehr transliteration (1961, 1994), a modification to DIN 31635.
  - EALL, Encyclopedia of Arabic Language and Linguistics (edited by Kees Versteegh, Brill, 2006–2009).
  - Spanish romanization, identical to DMG/DIN with the exception of three letters: ǧ > ŷ, ḫ > j, ġ > g.
- ISO 233 (1984), letter-to-letter; vowels are transliterated only if they are shown with diacritics, otherwise they are omitted.
  - ISO 233-2 (1993), simplified transliteration; vowels are always shown.
- BS 4280 (1968), developed by the British Standards Institution.

=== ASCII-based ===
- ArabTeX (since 1992) has been modelled closely after the transliteration standards ISO/R 233 and DIN 31635.
- Buckwalter Transliteration (1990s), developed at ALPNET by Tim Buckwalter; does not require diacritics.
- Arabic chat alphabet: an ad hoc solution for conveniently entering Arabic using a Latin keyboard.

== Comparison table ==
Letter	Unicode	Name		IPA	Mixed digraphs/diacritics				Diacritical					ASCII	
Letter	Unicode	ALA	ISO	IPA	BGN/ PCGN	UNGEGN	ALA-LC	EI	Wehr ^{1}	EALL	BS	DIN	ISO	ArabTeX	Arabizi ^{2}
ء ^{3}	0621	hamzah	hamzah	ʔ	ʼ ^{4}			ʾ	ʼ ^{4}	ʾ	ʼ ^{4}	ʾ	ˈ, ˌ	'	2
ا	0627	ʼalif	ˈalif	aː	ā								ʾ	A	a/e/é/æ
ب	0628	bāʼ	bāˈ	b	b										
ت	062A	tāʼ	tāˈ	t	t										
ث	062B	thāʼ	ṯāˈ	θ	th ^{5}			t͟h ^{5}	ṯ					_t	s/th/t/þ
ج ^{12}	062C	jīm	ǧīm	d͡ʒ (ɡ~ʒ)	j			d͟j ^{5}	j ^{6}		ǧ			^g	j/g/dj/gh/gi/ż/ž
ح	062D	ḥāʼ	ḥāˈ	ħ	ḩ ^{7}		ḥ							.h	7/h
خ	062E	khāʼ	ẖāˈ	x	kh ^{5}			k͟h ^{5}	ḵ ^{6}	x	ẖ	ḫ	ẖ	_h	kh/7'/5/j
د	062F	dāl	dāl	d	d										
ذ	0630	dhāl	ḏāl	ð	dh ^{5}			d͟h ^{5}	ḏ					_d	z/dh/th/d/ð
ر	0631	rāʼ	rāˈ	r	r										
ز	0632	zāy	zāy	z	z										
س	0633	sīn	sīn	s	s										
ش	0634	shīn	šīn	ʃ	sh ^{5}			s͟h ^{5}	š					^s	sh/ch/$/ș/š
ص	0635	ṣād	ṣād	sˤ	ş ^{7}		ṣ							.s	s/9/S
ض	0636	ḍād	ḍād	dˤ	ḑ ^{7}		ḍ							.d	d/9'/D
ط	0637	ṭāʼ	ṭāˈ	tˤ	ţ ^{7}		ṭ							.t	t/6/T
ظ	0638	ẓāʼ	ẓāˈ	ðˤ (zˤ)	z̧ ^{7}	d͟h ^{5}	ẓ			ḏ̣/ẓ^{11}	ẓ			.z	z/dh/6'/th/Ð
ع	0639	ʻayn	ʿayn	ʕ	ʻ ^{4}			ʿ	ʽ ^{4}	ʿ				`	3
غ	063A	ghayn	ġayn	ɣ	gh ^{5}			g͟h ^{5}	ḡ ^{6}	ġ	ḡ	ġ		.g	gh/3'/8/ġ
ف ^{8}	0641	fāʼ	fāˈ	f	f										
ق ^{8}	0642	qāf	qāf	q	q										2/g/q/8/9
ك	0643	kāf	kāf	k	k										
ل	0644	lām	lām	l	l										
م	0645	mīm	mīm	m	m										
ن	0646	nūn	nūn	n	n										
ه	0647	hāʼ	hāˈ	h	h										
و	0648	wāw	wāw	w, uː	w; ū									w; U	w/ou/oo/u/o
ي ^{9}	064A	yāʼ	yāˈ	j, iː	y; ī									y; I	y/i/ee/ei/ai
آ	0622	ʼalif maddah	ˈalif maddah	ʔaː	ā, ʼā					ʾā			ʾâ	'A	2a/aa
ة	0629	tāʼ marbūṭah	tāˈ marbūṭah	h, t	h; t				—; t	h; t			ẗ	T	a/e(h); et/at
ال	06270644	ʼalif lām	ˈalif lām	(var.)	al- ^{10}								ʾal	al-	el/al/æl
ى ^{9}	0649	ʼalif maqṣūrah	ˈalif maqṣurah	aː	á			ā					ỳ	_A	a/å
Vocalization
ـَ	064E	fatḥah		a	a										a/e/é
ـِ	0650	kasrah		i	i										i/e/é
ـُ ^{13}	064F	ḍammah		u	u										ou/o/u
ـَا	064E0627	fatḥah alif		aː	ā								aʼ	A/aa	a/ā
ـِي	0650064A	kasrah yāʼ		iː	ī								iy	I/iy	i/ee/ī
ـُو ^{13}	064F0648	ḍammah wāw		uː	ū								uw	U/uw	ou/oo/u/ū
ـَي	064E064A	fatḥah yāʼ		aj	ay										ay/ai/ey/ei/ă
ـَو	064E0648	fatḥah wāw		aw	aw										aw/aou/ø
ـً ^{14}	064B	fatḥatān		an	a^{n}		an						á	aN	an/ã
ـٍ ^{14}	064D	kasratān		in	i^{n}		in						í	iN	in/en/ĩ
ـٌ ^{14}	064C	ḍammatān		un	u^{n}		un						ú	uN	oun/on/oon/un/ũ

- ^1 Hans Wehr transliteration does not capitalize the first letter at the beginning of sentences nor in proper names.
- ^2 The chat table is only a demonstration and is based on the spoken varieties which vary considerably from Literary Arabic on which the IPA table and the rest of the transliterations are based.
- ^3 Review hamzah for its various forms.
- ^4 Neither standard defines which code point to use for hamzah and ʻayn. Appropriate Unicode points would be modifier letter apostrophe 〈ʼ〉 and modifier letter turned comma 〈ʻ〉 (for the UNGEGN and BGN/PCGN) or modifier letter reversed comma 〈ʽ〉 (for the Wehr and Survey of Egypt System (SES)), all of which Unicode defines as letters. Often right and left single quotation marks 〈'⟩, ⟨'⟩ are used instead, but Unicode defines those as punctuation marks, and they can cause compatibility issues. The glottal stop (hamzah) in these romanizations is not written word-initially.
- ^5 In Encyclopaedia of Islam digraphs are underlined, that is t͟h, d͟j, k͟h, d͟h, s͟h, g͟h (or t̲h̲, d̲j̲, k̲h̲, d̲h̲, s̲h̲, g̲h̲). On the contrary the sequences ـتـهـ, ـكـهـ, ـدهـ, ـسهـ may be romanized with middle dot as t·h, k·h, d·h, s·h respectively in BGN/PCGN, with the prime symbol tʹh, kʹh, dʹh, sʹh respectively in ALA-LC.
- ^6 In the original German edition of his dictionary (1952) Wehr used ǧ, ḫ, ġ for j, ḵ, ḡ respectively (that is all the letters used are equal to DMG/DIN 31635). The variant presented in the table is from the English translation of the dictionary (1961).
- ^7 BGN/PCGN allows use of underdots instead of cedilla.
- ^8Fāʼ and qāf are traditionally written in Northwestern Africa as ڢ and ڧـ ـڧـ ـٯ, respectively, while the latter's dot is only added initially or medially.
- ^9 In Egypt, Sudan, and sometimes in other regions, the standard form for final-yāʼ is only ى (without dots) in handwriting and print, for both final /-iː/ and final /-aː/. ى for the latter pronunciation, is called ألف ليّنة alif layyinah [ˈʔælef læjˈjenæ], 'flexible alif'.
- ^10 The sun and moon letters and hamzat waṣl pronunciation rules apply, although it is acceptable to ignore them. The UN system and ALA-LC prefer lowercase a and hyphens: al-Baṣrah, ar-Riyāḍ; BGN/PCGN prefers uppercase A and no hyphens: Al Baṣrah, Ar Riyāḍ.
- ^11 The EALL suggests ẓ "in proper names" (volume 4, page 517).
- ^12 BGN/PCGN, UNGEGN, ALA-LC, and DIN 31635 use a normal ⟨g⟩ for ⟨ج⟩ when romanizing Egyptian names or toponyms that are expectedly pronounced with /ɡ/.
- ^13 BGN/PCGN, UNGEGN, ALA-LC, and DIN 31635 use the French-based ⟨ou⟩ for /u(:)/ in Francophone Arabic speaking countries in names and toponyms.
- ^14 Nunation is ignored in all romanizations in names and toponyms.

== Romanization issues ==
Any romanization system has to make a number of decisions which are dependent on its intended field of application.

=== Vowels ===
One basic problem is that written Arabic is normally unvocalized; i.e., many of the vowels are not written out, and must be supplied by a reader familiar with the language. Hence unvocalized Arabic writing does not give a reader unfamiliar with the language sufficient information for accurate pronunciation. As a result, a pure transliteration, e.g., rendering قطر as qṭr, is meaningless to an untrained reader. For this reason, transcriptions are generally used that add vowels, e.g. qaṭar. However, unvocalized systems match exactly to written Arabic, unlike vocalized systems such as Arabic chat, which some claim detracts from one's ability to spell.

=== Transliteration vs. transcription ===
Most uses of romanization call for transcription rather than transliteration: Instead of transliterating each written letter, they try to reproduce the sound of the words according to the orthography rules of the target language: Qaṭar. This applies equally to scientific and popular applications. A pure transliteration would need to omit vowels (e.g. qṭr), making the result difficult to interpret except for a subset of trained readers fluent in Arabic. Even if vowels are added, a transliteration system would still need to distinguish between multiple ways of spelling the same sound in the Arabic script, e.g. alif ا vs. alif maqṣūrah ى for the sound /aː/ ā, and the six different ways (ء إ أ آ ؤ ئ) of writing the glottal stop (hamza, usually transcribed ʼ ). This sort of detail is needlessly confusing, except in a very few situations (e.g., typesetting text in the Arabic script).

Most issues related to the romanization of Arabic are about transliterating vs. transcribing; others, about what should be romanized:

- Some transliterations ignore assimilation of the definite article al- before the "sun letters", and may be easily misread by non-Arabic speakers. For instance, "the light" النور an-nūr would be more literally transliterated along the lines of alnūr. In the transcription an-nūr, a hyphen is added and the unpronounced /l/ removed for the convenience of the uninformed non-Arabic speaker, who would otherwise pronounce an /l/, perhaps not understanding that /n/ in nūr is geminated. Alternatively, if the shaddah is not transliterated (since it is strictly not a letter), a strictly literal transliteration would be alnūr, which presents similar problems for the uninformed non-Arabic speaker.
- A transliteration should render the "closed tāʼ" (tāʼ marbūṭah, ة) faithfully. Many transcriptions render the sound /a/ as a or ah and t when it denotes /at/.
  - ISO 233 has a unique symbol, ẗ.
- "Restricted alif" (alif maqṣūrah, ى) should be transliterated with an acute accent, á, differentiating it from regular alif ا, but it is transcribed in many schemes like alif, ā, because it stands for /aː/.
- Nunation: what is true elsewhere is also true for nunation: transliteration renders what is seen, transcription what is heard, when in the Arabic script, it is written with diacritics, not by letters, or omitted.

A transcription may reflect the language as spoken, typically rendering names, for example, by the people of Baghdad (Baghdad Arabic), or the official standard (Literary Arabic) as spoken by a preacher in the Mosque or a TV newsreader. A transcription is free to add phonological (such as vowels) or morphological (such as word boundaries) information. Transcriptions will also vary depending on the writing conventions of the target language; compare English Omar Khayyam with German Omar Chajjam, both for عمر خيام /ʕumar xajjaːm/, [ˈʕomɑr xæjˈjæːm] (unvocalized ʿmr ḫyām, vocalized ʻUmar Khayyām).

A transliteration is ideally fully reversible: a machine should be able to transliterate it back into Arabic. A transliteration can be considered as flawed for any one of the following reasons:

- A "loose" transliteration is ambiguous, rendering several Arabic phonemes with an identical transliteration, or such that digraphs for a single phoneme (such as dh gh kh sh th rather than ḏ ġ ḫ š ṯ) may be confused with two adjacent consonants—but this problem is resolved in the ALA-LC romanization system, where the prime symbol ʹ is used to separate two consonants when they do not form a digraph; for example: أَكْرَمَتْها akramatʹhā ('she honored her'), in which the t and h are two distinct consonantal sounds, or where the middle dot is used in the same way in the BGN/PCGN romanization.
- Symbols representing phonemes may be considered too similar (e.g., ʻ and ' or ʿ and ʾ for ع ʻayn and hamzah);
- ASCII transliterations using capital letters to disambiguate phonemes are easy to type, but may be considered unaesthetic.

A fully accurate transcription may not be necessary for native Arabic speakers, as they would be able to pronounce names and sentences correctly anyway, but it can be very useful for those not fully familiar with spoken Arabic and who are familiar with the Roman alphabet. An accurate transliteration serves as a valuable stepping stone for learning, pronouncing correctly, and distinguishing phonemes. It is a useful tool for anyone who is familiar with the sounds of Arabic but not fully conversant in the language.

One criticism is that a fully accurate system would require special learning that most do not have to actually pronounce names correctly, and that with a lack of a universal romanization system they will not be pronounced correctly by non-native speakers anyway. The precision will be lost if special characters are not replicated and if a reader is not familiar with Arabic pronunciation.

== Examples ==
Examples in Literary Arabic:

Arabic	أمجد كان له قصر	إلى المملكة المغربية
Arabic with diacritics (normally omitted)	أَمْجَدُ كَانَ لَهُ قَصْر	إِلَى الْمَمْلَكَةِ الْمَغْرِبِيَّة
IPA	/ʔamdʒadu kaːna lahuː qasˤr/	/ʔila‿l.mamlakati‿l.maɣribij.jah/
ALA-LC	Amjad kāna lahu qaṣr	Ilá al-mamlakah al-Maghribīyah
Hans Wehr	amjad kāna lahū qaṣr	ilā l-mamlaka al-maḡribīya
DIN 31635	ʾAmǧad kāna lahū qaṣr	ʾIlā l-mamlakah al-Maġribiyyah
UNGEGN	Amjad kāna lahu qaşr	Ilá al-mamlakah al-maghribiyyah
ISO 233	ʾˈamǧad kāna lahu qaṣr	ʾˈilaỳ ʾˈalmamlakaẗ ʾˈalmaġribiȳaẗ
ArabTeX	am^gad kAna lahu qa.sr	il_A almamlakaT alma.gribiyyaT
English	Amjad had a palace	To the Moroccan Kingdom

== Arabic alphabet and nationalism ==
There have been many instances of national movements to convert Arabic script into Latin script or to romanize the language.

=== Lebanon ===
LEBNAAN in proposed Said Akl alphabet (issue #686)

A Beirut newspaper, La Syrie, pushed for the change from Arabic script to Latin script in 1922. The major head of this movement was Louis Massignon, a French Orientalist, who brought his concern before the Arabic Language Academy in Damascus in 1928. Massignon's attempt at romanization failed as the Academy and the population viewed the proposal as an attempt from the Western world to take over their country. Sa'id Afghani, a member of the Academy, asserted that the movement to romanize the script was a Zionist plan to dominate Lebanon.

=== Egypt ===
After the period of colonialism in Egypt, Egyptians were looking for a way to reclaim and reemphasize Egyptian culture. As a result, some Egyptians pushed for an Egyptianization of the Arabic language in which the formal Arabic and the colloquial Arabic would be combined into one language and the Latin alphabet would be used. There was also the idea of finding a way to use hieroglyphics instead of the Latin alphabet. A scholar, Salama Musa, agreed with the idea of applying a Latin alphabet to Egyptian Arabic, as he believed that would allow Egypt to have a closer relationship with the West. He also believed that Latin script was key to the success of Egypt as it would allow for more advances in science and technology. This change in script, he believed, would solve the problems inherent with Arabic, such as a lack of written vowels and difficulties writing foreign words. Ahmad Lutfi As Sayid and Muhammad Azmi, two Egyptian intellectuals, agreed with Musa and supported the push for romanization. The idea that romanization was necessary for modernization and growth in Egypt continued with Abd Al Aziz Fahmi in 1944. He was the chairman for the Writing and Grammar Committee for the Arabic Language Academy of Cairo. He desired to implement romanization in a way that allowed words and spellings to remain somewhat familiar to the Egyptian people. However, this effort failed as the Egyptian people felt a strong cultural tie to the Arabic alphabet, particularly the older generation.

== See also ==
- Arabic chat alphabet
- Arabic diacritics
- Arabic grammar
- Arabic names
- Glottal stop (letter)
- Maltese alphabet
- Ottoman Turkish alphabet – a Perso-Arabic-based alphabet, which was replaced by the Latin-based Turkish alphabet in 1928
- Romanization of Hebrew
- Romanization of Persian
- Standard Arabic Technical Transliteration System (SATTS)

== Bibliography ==
- Reichmuth, Philipp (2011). "Transcription". In Edzard, L.; de Jong, R. E. (eds.). Encyclopedia of Arabic Language and Linguistics. Brill. p. 515-520. doi:10.1163/1570-6699_eall_EALL_COM_0348.
- Verlato, Olga (2023). "A Latin Alphabet for the Arabic Language: Romanizing Arabic in Late Nineteenth-Century Egypt and Beyond". International Journal of Middle East Studies. 55 (3): 444–460. doi:10.1017/S002074382300079X. ISSN 0020-7438.
