= William Bedwell =

English priest and scholar

William Bedwell (c. 1561 – 5 May 1632 near London) was an English priest and scholar, specializing in Arabic and other "oriental" languages as well as in mathematics.

Bedwell was educated at Trinity College, Cambridge. He served the Church of England as Rector of St Ethelburga's Bishopsgate and Vicar of All Hallows, Tottenham (known at the time as 'Tottenham High Cross') from 1607. He was the author of the first local history of the area, A Briefe Description of the Towne of Tottenham.

He published in quarto an edition of the Epistles of John in Arabic, with a Latin version, printed by the Raphelengius family at Antwerp in 1612. He also left many Arabic manuscripts to the University of Cambridge and a typeface for printing them. According to McClure, it was Bedwell, and not Thomas Van Erpen, who was the first to revive the study of Arabic literature in Europe. His uncompleted preparations for an Arabic lexicon were eclipsed by the publication of a similar work by Jacobus Golius in 1653. He asserted that knowledge of Arabic was necessary to a deeper understanding of ancient Hebrew. Bedwell's manuscripts were loaned, following his death, to the University of Cambridge, where they were consulted by Edmund Castell during the creation of the monumental Lexicon Heptaglotton (1669). Another manuscript, for a dictionary of Persian, was in the possession of William Laud, Archbishop of Canterbury, and now resides at the Bodleian Library. Besides his Arabic Epistles of John, his best known published work was A Discovery of the Impostures of Mahomet and of the Koran, (1615). He was among the 'First Westminster Company' charged by James I of England with the translation of the first twelve books of the King James Version of the Bible.

Bedwell also invented a ruler for geometrical purposes, similar to the Gunter's scale. He died at his vicarage at the age of 72.
