= Andalusi Arabic =

Variety of Arabic formerly spoken on the Iberian Peninsula

- العربية الأندلسية
- Native to: Al-Andalus (modern-day Spain and Portugal)
- Extinct: after early 17th century
- Language family: Afro-Asiatic: Semitic; West Semitic; Central Semitic; Arabic; Maghrebi; Andalusi Arabic
- Writing system: Arabic alphabet (Maghrebi script)

Language codes
- ISO 639-3: xaa
- Glottolog: anda1287

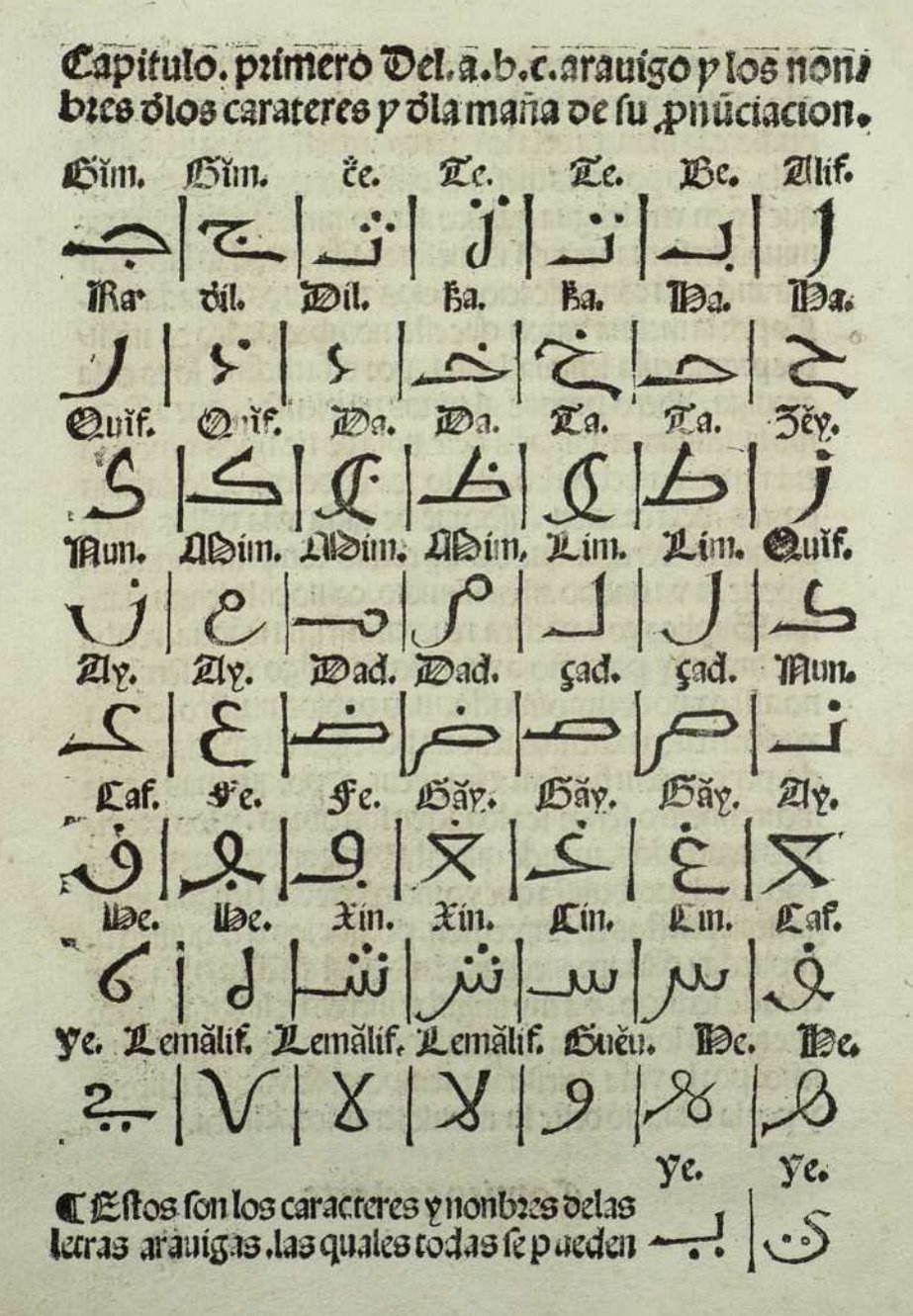
The Arte para ligeramente saber la lengua arauiga (1506) by Pedro de Alcalá uses an innovative system for transcribing Andalusian Arabic that has been called "the first Western system of Arabic scientific transcription" by Federico Corriente.

Andalusi Arabic or Andalusian Arabic (Arabic: اللهجة العربية الأندلسية, romanized: al-lahja al-ʿarabiyya al-ʾandalusiyya) was a variety or varieties of Arabic (Note: Spanish Arabist and lexicographer Federico Corriente insisted on describing Andalusi Arabic as a "dialect bundle" in which "the common core was predominant and the local features, minimal." Within this dialect bundle, there were regional variations as well as higher and lower colloquial registers.) spoken mainly from the 8th to the 15th century in Al-Andalus, the regions of the Iberian Peninsula under Muslim rule.

Arabic spread gradually over the centuries of Muslim rule in Iberia, primarily through conversion to Islam, although it was also learned and spoken by Christians and Jews. Arabic became the language of administration and was the primary language of literature produced in al-Andalus; the Andalusi vernacular was distinct among medieval Arabic vernaculars in that it was used in poetry, in zajal and the kharjas of muwaššaḥāt.

Arabic in al-Andalus existed largely in a situation of bilingualism with Andalusi Romance (known popularly as Mozarabic) until the 13th century. Arabic in Iberia was also characterized by diglossia: in addition to standard written Arabic, spoken varieties could be subdivided into an urban, educated idiolect and a register of the less-privileged masses.

After the fall of Granada in 1492, the Catholic rulers suppressed the use of Arabic, persecuting its speakers, passing policies against its use (such as the Pragmática Sanción de 1567, which led directly to the Rebellion of the Alpujarras), and expelling the Moriscos in the early 17th century, after which Arabic became an extinct language in Iberia. An Andalusi variety of Arabic continued to be spoken to some degree in North Africa after the expulsion, and it was notably preserved in Andalusi classical music traditions in North Africa. Andalusi speakers influenced the speech of those Maghrebi communities into which they fled and assimilated.

Spoken Andalusi Arabic had distinct features. It is unique among colloquial dialects in retaining from Standard Arabic the internal passive voice through vocalization. Through contact with Romance, spoken Andalusi Arabic adopted the phonemes /p/ and /tʃ/. Like the other Iberian languages, Andalusi lacked vowel length but had stress instead (e.g. Andalusí in place of Andalusī). A feature shared with Maghrebi Arabic was that the first-person imperfect was marked with the prefix n- (نلعب nalʿab 'I play') like the plural in Standard Arabic, necessitating an analogical imperfect first-person plural, constructed with the suffix -ū (نلعبوا nalʿabū 'we play'). A feature characteristic of it was the extensive imala that transformed alif into an /e/ or /i/ (e.g. al-kirā ("rent") > al-kirē > Spanish "alquiler").

== History ==
=== Origins ===
The Muslim conquest of Spain in 711, about a century after the death of Muhammad, involved a few thousand Arab tribesmen and a much larger number of partially Arabicized Amazigh, many of whom spoke little to no Arabic. According to Consuelo López-Morillas, "this population sowed the seeds of what was to grow into an indigenous Andalusi Arabic."

Unlike the Visigothic conquest of Hispania, through which Latin remained the dominant language, the Muslim conquest brought a language that was a "vehicle for a higher culture, a literate and literary civilization."

=== Spread ===
Over the centuries, Arabic spread gradually in al-Andalus, primarily through conversion to Islam. While Alvarus of Cordoba lamented in the 9th century that Christians were no longer using Latin, Richard Bulliet estimates that only 50% of the population of al-Andalus had converted to Islam by the death of Abd al-Rahman III in 961, and 80% by 1100. By about 1260, Muslim territories in Iberia were reduced to the Emirate of Granada, in which more than 90% of the population had converted to Islam and Arabic-Romance bilingualism seems to have disappeared.

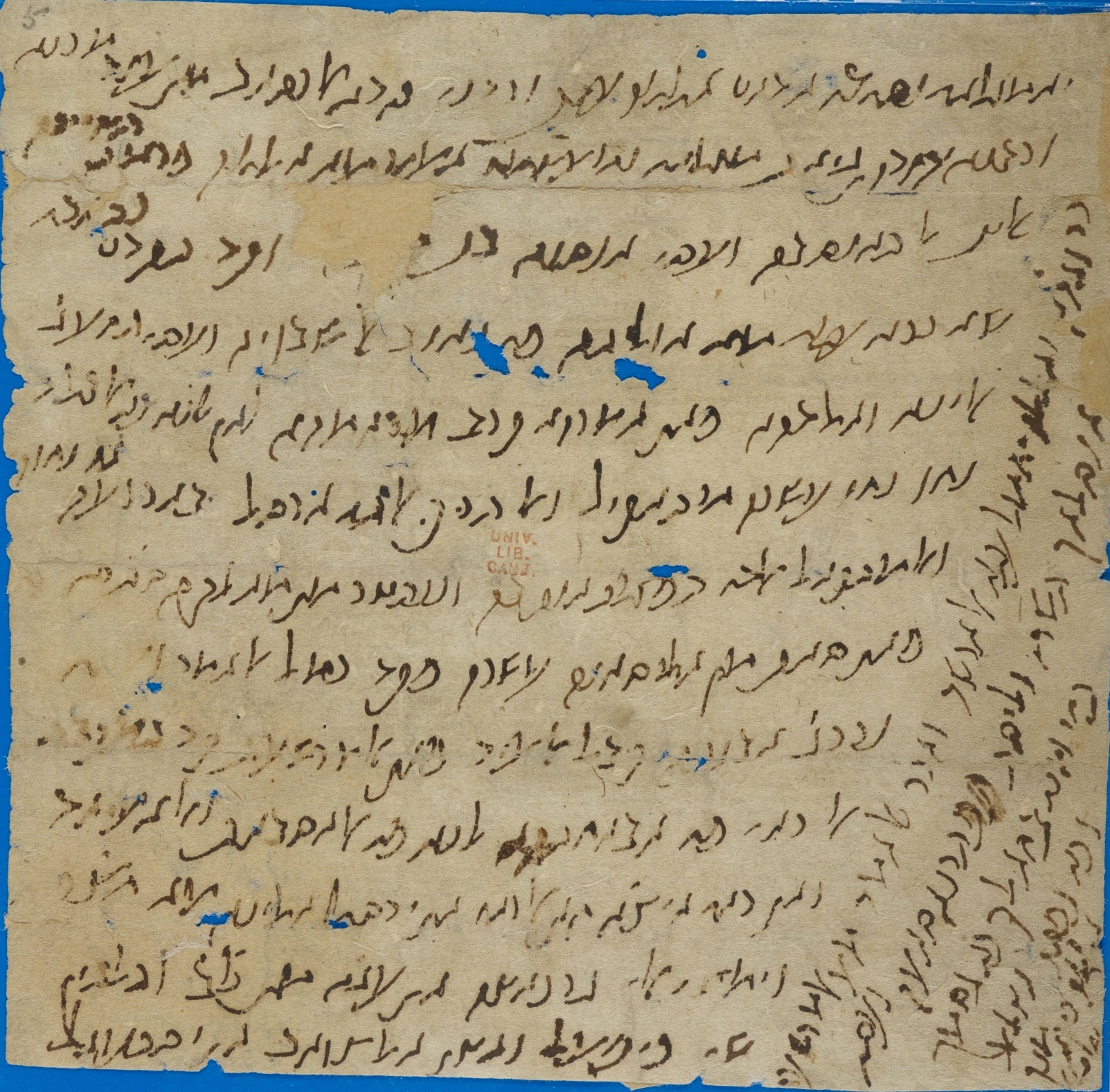
A letter handwritten in Judeo-Arabic by Judah ha-Levi (1075–1141). While Muslims did not write in vernacular registers of Arabic, Andalusi Jews would write in colloquial Arabic with Hebrew script.

The colloquial Arabic of al-Andalus was prominent among the varieties of Arabic of its time in its use for literary purposes, especially in zajal poetry and proverbs and aphorisms.

=== Demise ===
After the Fall of Granada in 1492, Cardinal Francisco Jiménez de Cisneros oversaw the forced mass conversion of the population in the Spanish Inquisition and the burning of Andalusi manuscripts in Granada. In 1502, the Muslims of Granada were forced to choose between conversion and exile; those who converted became known as the Moriscos. In 1526, Charles V (Charles I of Spain)—issued an edict against "heresy" (e.g. Muslim practices by "New Christians"), including the use of Arabic, extending the restriction to Muslims throughout the rest of Spain, the Mudéjars. The Moriscos managed to get this suspended for forty years by the payment of a large sum (80,000 ducados). King Philip II of Spain's Pragmática Sanción de 1567 finally banned the use of Arabic throughout Spain—forbidding Moriscos from the use of Arabic on all occasions, formal and informal, speaking and writing—leading directly to the Rebellion of the Alpujarras (1568–71). Still, Andalusi Arabic remained in use in certain areas of Spain (particularly the inner regions of Valencia and Aragon) until the final expulsion of the Moriscos at the beginning of the 17th century.

=== Legacy ===
Andalusi Arabic is still used in Andalusi classical music and has significantly influenced the dialects of such towns as Sfax in Tunisia, Rabat, Salé, Fès, Tétouan and Tangier in Morocco, Nedroma, Tlemcen, Blida, Jijel, and Cherchell in Algeria. Andalusi Arabic also influenced Andalusi Romance ("Mozarabic"), Spanish, Judaeo-Spanish varieties, Catalan, Portuguese and Algerian, Moroccan and Tunisian Arabics.

== Sociolinguistic features ==
=== Prestige ===
Under Muslim rule, Arabic became a superstrate, prestige language and the dominant medium of literary and intellectual expression in the southern half of the peninsula from the 8th century to the 13th century. Consuelo Lopez-Morillas notes that poetic genres such as zajal and the popular literature of proverbs and aphorisms demonstrate that, among speakers of Andalusi Arabic, there was a "consciousness of, and even pride in, the distinctiveness of the dialect, its suppleness and expressivity."

=== Multilingualism and language contact ===
==== Romance ====
Arabic in al-Andalus existed largely in a situation of bilingualism with Romance until the 13th century, when the Almohad expansion into Iberia led to the flight of Christians living under Muslim rule in the south of Iberia northward to territories under Christian rule and to the reduction of territory under Muslim rule to the Emirate of Granada following a sequence of Christian conquests of Muslim cities.

Of the approximately 600 known secular Arabic muwaššaḥāt, there about 50 with kharjas in Andalusi Romance or containing some Romance words or elements.

The influence of Romance on Andalusi Arabic was especially pronounced in situations of daily Arabic-Romance contact. For example, an Arabic letter written by a Valencian Morisco in 1595 contained constructions such as taʿmál alburšíblī ('do what is possible,' constructed with the Arabic verb تعمل 'you do,' the Arabic definitive article الـ 'the' and the Romance buršíblī cognate of English 'possible') and aquštiš matáʿī ('at a cost to me,' with the Romance aquštiš 'at a cost' and the Arabic personal possessive متاعي 'my').

The influence of Arabic on Spanish resulting from this linguistic contact has been thoroughly studied, but Romance also reciprocally influenced Andalusi Arabic. Dialectical features of Andalusi Arabic owing to Arabic-Romance bilingualism and contact include of the adoption of the phonemes /p/ and /tʃ/; the substitution of the traditional Arabic vowel length for the Iberian syllabic stress (e.g. Andalusí in place of Andalusī); and the change of gender of some nouns to corresponding the gender in Romance, such as the feminine Arabic nouns ʿayn (عين 'eye') and shams (شمس 'sun'), which became masculine in al-Andalus, matching ojo and sol.

==== Hebrew ====
Arabic also coexisted with Hebrew, and Arabic features and traditions had a major impact on Jewish poetry in Iberia. There is evidence that code-switching was commonplace among bilingual populations in al-Andalus. About half of the corpus of the more than 250 known muwaššaḥāt in Hebrew have kharjas in Arabic, and some there are some kharjas with a mix of Arabic and Hebrew.

==== al-lisān al-gharbī ====
It also had some contact with Berber languages or al-lisān al-gharbī (اللسان الغربي 'the western tongue') in periods of Berber rule, particularly under the Almoravids and Almohads, though Federico Corriente identified only about 15 Berberisms that entered Andalusi Arabic speech.

=== Diglossia ===
It was also characterized by diglossia: in addition to standard written Arabic, spoken varieties could be subdivided into an urban, educated idiolect and a register of the less-privileged masses.

== Linguistic features ==
Many features of Andalusi Arabic have been reconstructed by Arabists using Hispano-Arabic texts (such as the azjāl of ibn Quzman, al-Shushtari and others) composed in Arabic with varying degrees of deviation from classical norms, augmented by further information from the manner in which the Arabic script was used to transliterate Romance words. The first complete linguistic description of Andalusi Arabic was given by the Spanish Arabist Federico Corriente, who drew on the Appendix Probi, zajal poetry, proverbs and aphorisms, the work of the 16th century lexicographer Pedro de Alcalá, and Andalusi letters found in the Cairo Geniza.

=== Lexicography ===
==== Romance loanwords ====
As Arabisms moved into varieties of Iberian Romance over time, Andalusi Arabic borrowed widely from the Romance lexicon. Corriente observes three periods in which Romance words entered Arabic, as Romance shifted from a substratum to an adstratum to a superstratum with respect to Arabic. Semantic fields such as plant and animal names, domestic objects, and agriculture received the most loanwords. Sometimes both the Romance and Arabic words were used, such as the words imlíq (from UMBILICU) and surra (سُرَّة) for navel; Consuelo Lopez-Morillas recalls "the many households made up of Hispano-Roman women and Arab men." Once subsumed into Arabic morphological patterns, Romance loanwords became difficult to distinguish as such. For example, nibšāriuh (from aniversario 'anniversary' or 'birthday') was made plural as nibšāriyāt and lubb (from lobo 'wolf') became a broken plural as lababah. Romance loanwords were used in Andalusi Arabic through the end of Muslim rule in Iberia, even after Granada had been monolingually arabophone for two centuries.

==== Berber loanwords ====
The lexical impact of Berber language on Andalusi Arabic appears to be considerably less than that of Romance and very small in proportion to the extensive Berber presence in al-Andalus. Corriente identified about 15 Berberisms that entered Andalusi Arabic, only a few of which were still in use in the early 16th century.

=== Phonology ===
Vowel phonemes of Andalusi Arabic
	Short		Long	
	Front	Back	Front	Back
Close	/i/	/u/	/iː/	/uː/
Open	/a/		/aː/	
Diphthongs	/aw/, /aj/, /iw/			

Andalusi Arabic consonant phonemes
		Labial	Dental	Denti-alveolar		Palatal	Velar	Uvular	Pharyngeal	Glottal
		Labial	Dental	plain	emphatic	Palatal	Velar	Uvular	Pharyngeal	Glottal
Nasal		m		n						
Plosive/ affricate	voiceless	p~pˤ (Note: [p] was at the very least, a marginal phoneme, but a phoneme nonetheless. /p/ "behaved most of the time as an "emphaticised" phoneme, resistant to imāla or palatalisation" thus possibly being pronounced as [pˤ].)		t	tˤ	t͡ʃ (Note: [t͡ʃ] was a marginal phoneme used mainly in Romance loanwords. In the Granadan dialect, /t͡ʃ/ represented the evolution of the cluster /st/. In lower registers, [t͡ʃ] was occasionally an allophone of /d͡ʒ/ in word-final position by speakers of Hispanic origin.)	k	q (Note: The standard pronunciation of ق was most likely [q]. Though it merged with [k] in at least some words.)		ʔ (Note: [ʔ] only survived in word-initial position, while turning into [j] or [w] intravocalically, or sometimes in other positions. Rarely, [ʔ] would turn into [ʕ]. In most other instances, [ʔ] would cause an adjacent vowel to be stressed or would disappear altogether, leaving no trace.)
Plosive/ affricate	voiced	b		d		d͡ʒ~ʒ (Note: ج was variously realized as [d͡ʒ] or [ʒ])	(ɡ) (Note: ق had an alternate and substandard pronunciation of [ɡ] amongst speakers of Hispanic origin, especially bilingual Romance speakers. ج was also alternatively pronounced as [ɡ] by some speakers, although this was marginal.)			
Fricative	voiceless	f	θ	s	sˤ	ʃ	x ~ χ		ħ	h
Fricative	voiced	(β~v) (Note: Under Berber and Romance influence, [b] would sometimes turn into a bilabial spirant (fricative) [β], especially intravocalically. This fricative could turn into [f] via devoicing, thus presumably being realized as [v] before devoicing took place. Sometimes, it further evolved into [w]. Either way, a voiced bilabial or labiodental fricative was "substandard and repressed".)	ð	z	ðˤ~dˤ (Note: By the time of the Cordoban Caliphate, [dˤ] and [ðˤ] had merged. Thus, ض and ظ would have been pronounced the same.)		ɣ ~ ʁ		ʕ	
Approximant				l	ɫ (Note: Velarized in at least the word Allah, as in most Arabic dialects.)	j	w			
Trill				r~ɾ (Note: ر was realized as either a trill or a tap.)	rˤ~ɾˤ (Note: Contrasting pairs of words differing only by a plain or an emphatic pronunciation of their respective <r> are found.)					

The phoneme represented by the letter ق in texts is a point of contention. The letter, which in Classical Arabic represented either a voiceless pharyngealized velar stop or a voiceless uvular stop, most likely represented some kind of post-alveolar affricate or velar plosive in Andalusi Arabic. Federico Corriente presents the case that ق most often represented /q/, sometimes /k/, and marginally /ɡ/ based on a plethora of surviving Andalusi writings and Romance transcriptions of Andalusi Arabic words.

The vowel system was subject to a heavy amount of fronting and raising, a phenomenon known as imāla, causing /a(ː)/ to be raised, probably to [ɛ] or [e] and, particularly with short vowels, [ɪ] in certain circumstances, particularly when i-mutation was possible.

Contact with native Romance speakers led to the introduction of the phonemes /p/, /ɡ/ and, possibly, the affricate /tʃ/ from loanwords.

Monophthongization led to the disappearance of certain diphthongs such as /aw/ and /aj/ which were leveled to /oː/ and /eː/, respectively, though Colin hypothesizes that these diphthongs remained in the more mesolectal registers influenced by the Classical language. Alternatively in higher registers, [e] and [o] were only allophones of /i/ and /u/ respectively, while diphthongs were mostly resistant to monophthongization. However, /a/ could turn into [e] or [i] via imāla. In the presence of velar or pharyngeal contour, /a/ was backed into [ɑ] and sometimes even rounded into [o] or [u], or even [ɒ]. This is evidenced by occasional Romance or even local Arabic transcription of /a/ as [o] or [u].

There was a fair amount of compensatory lengthening involved where a loss of consonantal gemination lengthened the preceding vowel, whence the transformation of عشّ /ʕuʃ(ʃ)/ ("nest") into عوش /ʕuːʃ/.

New phonemes introduced into Andalusi Arabic, such as /p/ and /t͡ʃ/ were often written as geminated بّ and جّ respectively. This would later be carried over into Aljamiado, in which /p/ and /t͡ʃ/ in Romance languages would be transcribed with the above letters, each containing a shadda.

=== Syntax ===
==== Passive voice ====
Andalusi Arabic is uniquely conservative among colloquial Arabic dialects for retaining the internal passive voice (صيغة المجهول sighatu l-majhūl) of Standard Arabic verbs, using the same stem of the active voice verb with different vocalization. The passive voice is expressed in the past or perfect tense with kasra (/i/) on the last syllable and damma (/u/) on all other syllables, and in the imperfect tense with damma /u/ on the personal subject prefix—the first syllable—and fatḥah /a/ on the following syllables.

Active (مبنى للمعلوم)			Passive (مبنى للمجهول)		
Andalusi Arabic	transliteration	English	Andalusi Arabic	transliteration	English
تَرْجَم	tarjam	(he) translated	تُرْجِم	turjim	(it) was translated
يِتَرْجَم	yitarjam	(he) translates	يُتَرْجَم	yutarjam	(it) is translated

==== Noun gender ====
Some nouns in Andalusi Arabic shifted gender to match the gender of corresponding terms in Romance, such as the feminine Arabic nouns ʿayn (عين 'eye') and shams (شمس 'sun'), which became masculine in al-Andalus, matching ojo and sol.

=== Morphology ===
Gender distinction in second-person pronouns and verbs was abandoned.

There were about twenty suffixes from Romance that were attached to Arabic bases.

The -an which, in Classical Arabic, marked a noun as indefinite accusative case (see nunation), became an indeclinable conjunctive particle, as in ibn Quzmān's expression rajul-an 'ashīq.

The unconjugated prepositive negative particle lis developed out of the classical verb lays-a.

The derivational morphology of the verbal system was substantially altered. One example is the initial n- on verbs in the first person singular, a feature shared by many Maghrebi varieties. Likewise the form V pattern of tafaʻʻal-a (تَفَعَّلَ) was altered by epenthesis to atfa``al (أتْفَعَّل).

Andalusi Arabic developed a contingent/subjunctive mood (after a protasis with the conditional particle law) consisting of the imperfect (prefix) form of a verb, preceded by either kān or kīn (depending on the register of the speech in question), of which the final -n was normally assimilated by preformatives y- and t-. An example drawn from Ibn Quzmān will illustrate this:

Example	Transliteration	English translation
لِس كِن تّراني لَو لا ما نانّ بعد	lis ki-ttarānī (underlying form: kīn tarānī) law (Note: The conditional "law" (لَو) is the source of the modern Spanish Ojalá, (law sha Allah; لَوْ شَآءَ ٱللَّهُ).) lā mā nānnu baʻad	You would not see me if I were not still moaning

== Recorded evidence ==
The oldest evidence of Andalusi Arabic utterances can be dated from the 10th and 11th century, in isolated quotes, both in prose and stanzaic Classical Andalusi poems (muwashshahat), and then, from the 11th century on, in stanzaic dialectal poems (zajal) and dialectal proverb collections.

Substantial material on late Granadan Arabic survives in the work of Pedro de Alcalá—the Vocabulista aravigo en letra castellana and Arte para ligeramente saber la lengua araviga, both published in 1505 to explain the language of the conquered to the conquerors following the Fall of Granada.

Its last documents are a few business records and one letter written at the beginning of the 17th century in Valencia.

== See also ==
- Varieties of Arabic
- Maghrebi Arabic
- Siculo-Arabic
- Aljamiado
- Andalusi Romance

== Bibliography ==
- Corriente, Federico (2013). A Descriptive and Comparative Grammar of Andalusi Arabic. BRILL. ISBN 978-90-04-22742-2.
- Singer, Hans-Rudolf (1981), "Zum arabischen Dialekt von Valencia", Oriens, vol. 27, Brill, pp. 317–323, doi:10.2307/1580571, JSTOR 1580571
- Corriente, Federico (1978), "Los fonemas /p/ /č/ y /g/ en árabe hispánico", Vox Romanica, vol. 37, pp. 214–18
