= Ibn Quzman =

Al-Andalus poet (1078–1160)

- أبو بكر محمد بن عيسى بن عبدالملك بن عيسى بن قزمان الزهري
- Born: 1078; Córdoba, Al-Andalus
- Died: 1160 (aged 81–82); Córdoba, Al-Andalus
- Occupation: Poet
- Writing career
- Notable work: Diwan of Ibn Quzman

Abu Bakr Muhammad ibn Isa Abd al-Malik ibn Isa ibn Quzman al-Zuhri (Arabic: أبو بكر محمد بن عيسى بن عبدالملك بن عيسى بن قزمان الزهري; 1087–1160) was the single most famous poet in the history of Al-Andalus and he is also considered to be one of its most original. One of the characteristics of his poetry was "satire, verging on the licentious, aimed at religious experts." He deeply admired his "Eastern predecessor" Abu Nuwas.

== Life ==
He was born and died in Cordoba during the reign of the Almoravids, to a family of possibly Gothic origins, while according to certain scholars he was from an Arab family. After leading a lifestyle similar to that of troubadours, traveling to Seville, Granada and Jaén, he became a mosque imam towards the end of his life.

== Diwan ==
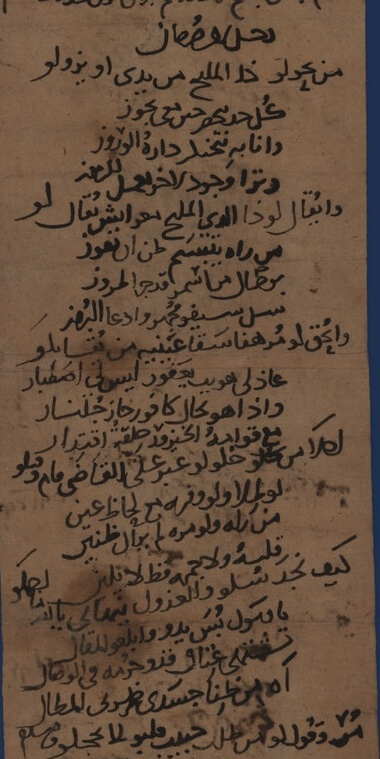
A zajal in Andalusi vernacular Arabic with a muwaššaḥ-like structure beginning with من يحولو ذا المليح من يدي أو يزولو كل حد يتحصر حين معي يجوز وأنا به نتخنكر داره الوروز attributed to Ibn Quzman in a leaflet found in the Cairo Geniza.

Only 149 poems from the Diwan of Ibn Quzman appear in a manuscript in Saint Petersburg, which was the subject of a notice published in 1881. A facsimile edition of it titled Le Divan d'Ibn Guzman was published in 1896 in Berlin by Baron David von Günzburg.

Most of the extant poems are zajals, the genre by which he earned his fame which are characterized by their colloquial language, as well as a typical rhyming scheme: aaab cccb dddb, where b rhymes with a constantly recurring refrain of one or two lines. As noted by James T. Monroe,

With one notable exception, Andalusi and North African scholars and critics, while they could not categorically deny that poet’s remarkable literary achievements, all tended to downplay them, by highlighting instead, passages from his classical Arabic production in verse and in prose (none of which has survived, aside from the handful of fragments they quote), while at the same time ignoring his zajals to the best of their ability.

His approach to life as expressed in these melodious poems, together with their mixed idiom (occasionally using words of the Romance languages), shows a resemblance to the later vernacular troubadour poetry of France.

=== Translations ===
The Diwan has been translated in Spanish by Federico Corriente (under the title Cancionero hispanoárabe) and in English by Monroe.
