= Pedro de Alcalá =

Spanish lexicographer

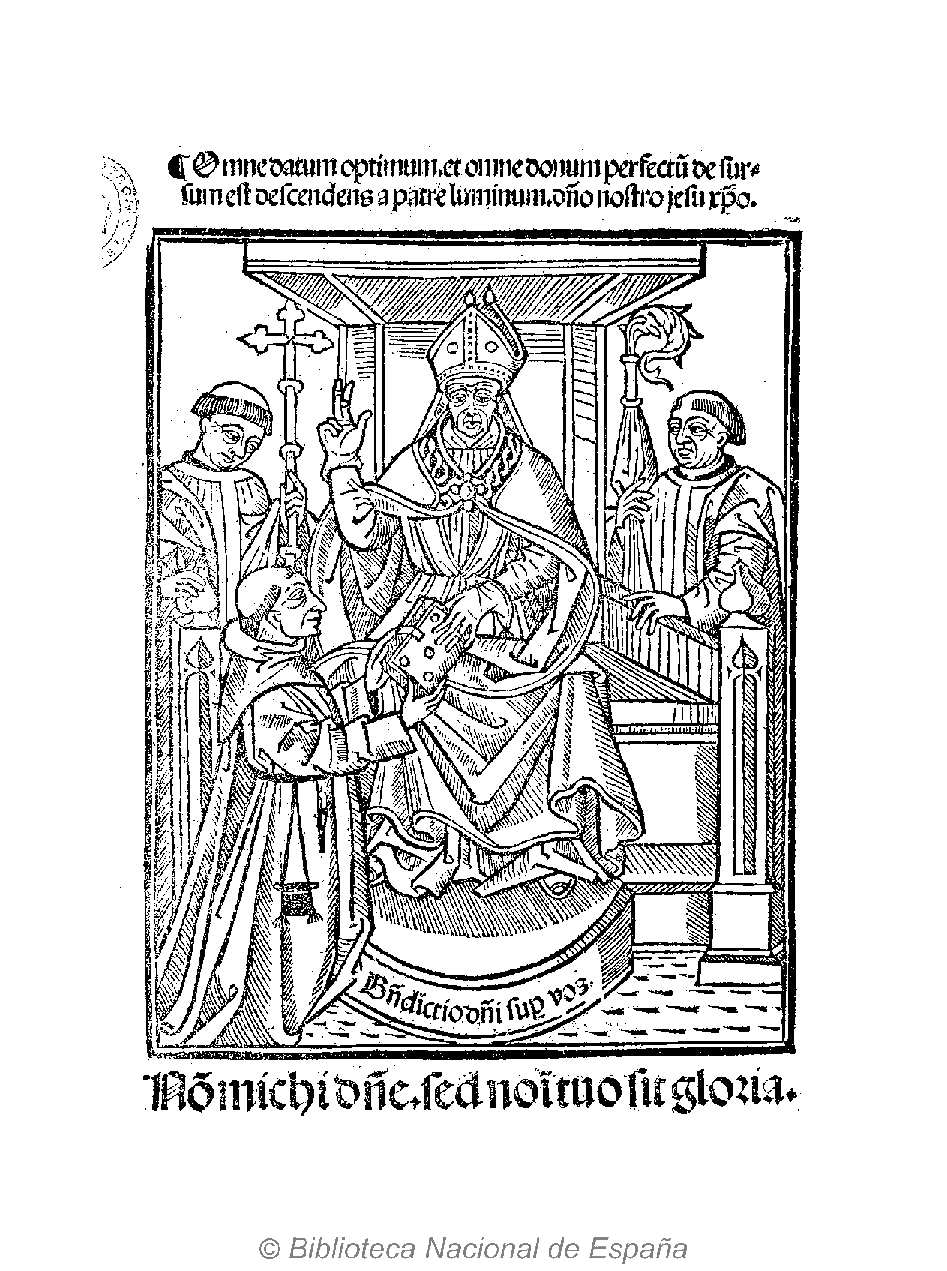
Fray Pedro de Alcalá giving a copy of his work to the archbishop of Granada, fray Hernando de Talavera. Engraving on the title page of the Vocabulista aravigo en letra castellana, Granada, 1505.

Pedro de Alcalá (born circa 1455) was a Hieronymite lexicographer. After the conquest of Granada by Castile, he collaborated with fellow member of the Order of Saint Jerome Fray Hernando de Talavera in the latter's efforts to catechize the moriscos (forced converts to Christianity) from Granada. Some authors suggest the possibility of Pedro de Alcalá being a morisco himself, or descent of mudéjares, while others suspect he may be a Jewish converso. He authored the Arte para ligeramente saber lengua araviga (transl. 'Art to slightly learn Arabic'), a grammar for understanding the Granadan Arabic dialect; and the Vocabulista aravigo en letra castellana, a dictionary of Granadan Arabic, the first ever Spanish-Arabic dictionary; both jointly published in Granada in 1505. Some scholars note that he had limited knowledge of the Arabic grammatical theory and used the Greco-Latin approach to his transcription system.

The system of Pedro de Alcalá to transcribe the Granada's dialect of Andalusian Arabic has been called the "first Western system of Arabic scientific transcription" by Federico Corriente. His transcription system was further reworked and simplified by the theologian Martín Pérez de Ayala in his 1556 work Doctrina Cristiana.
