= Zajal =

Form of oral strophic poetry

Zajal (Arabic: زجل) is a traditional form of oral strophic poetry declaimed in a colloquial dialect. The earliest recorded zajal poet was Ibn Quzman of al-Andalus who lived from 1078 to 1160. Most scholars see the Andalusi Arabic zajal, the stress-syllable versification of which differs significantly from the quantitative meter of classical Arabic poetry, as a form of expression adapted from Romance languages' popular poetry traditions into Arabic—first at the folkloric level and then by lettered poets such as Ibn Quzman.

It is generally conceded that the early ancestors of Levantine dialectical poetry were the Andalusian zajal and muwashshaḥah, brought to Egypt and the eastern Mediterranean by Moors fleeing Spain in the thirteenth and fourteenth centuries. An early master of Egyptian zajal was the fourteenth century zajjāl Abu ʿAbd Allāh al-Ghubārī. Zajal's origins may be ancient but it can be traced back to at least the 12th century. Today, it is most alive in the Levant—especially in Lebanon (see below), Palestine, Syria, and in Jordan where professional zajal practitioners can attain high levels of recognition and popularity—as well as the Maghreb, particularly Morocco and Algeria. Zajal is semi-improvised and semi-sung and is often performed in the format of a debate between zajjalin (poets who improvise the zajal). It is usually accompanied by percussive musical instruments (with the occasional wind instrument, e.g. the ney) and a chorus of men (and more recently, women) who sing parts of the verse.

Egyptian poets known for their literary use of the popular zajal form are Yaqub Sanu, 'Abd Allah al-Nadim, Bayram al-Tunisi, and Ahmed Fouad Negm. Well-known Lebanese zajjaali include Zein Sh'eib, Talih Hamdan, Zaghloul alDamour, Moussa Zgheib, Asaad Said, and Khalil Rukoz.

== Etymology ==
According to Lane's Lexicon, the root verb zajila means variously to make a sound, to utter a cry, to evince emotion, to play or sport. Adnan Haydar, a scholar specializing in Arabic language and literature, cites Ibn Manzur's 14th century lexicon Lisan al-Arab in attributing the meaning of "to raise the voice in singing" to the root verb zajala. Focusing on one of the meanings given by Lane, another scholar maintains that the etymology of zajal is related to play and musical entertainment.

== Andalusi zajal ==
Zajal poetry is in the colloquial Arabic of al-Andalus rather than Standard Arabic. Zajal differs from classical Arabic poetry in that the former has strophic form and the latter is monorhymed. Zajal's stress-syllable versification, or qualitative meter, also differs significantly from the quantitative meter of classical Arabic poetry.

Most scholars see the Andalusi Arabic zajal as a form of expression adapted from Romance languages' popular poetry traditions into Arabic—first at the folkloric level and then by lettered poets such as Ibn Quzman. The versification patterns of Andalusi zajal resemble those of Galician cantigas, Castilian villancicos, Italian dansas and ballatas, and French rondeau and virelai.

== Lebanese zajal ==
Lebanese zajal is a semi-improvised, semi-sung or declaimed form of poetry in the Lebanese variety of Levantine Arabic. Its roots may be as ancient as Pre-Islamic Arabic poetry, but various similar manifestations of zajal can be traced to 10th- to 12th-century Moorish Spain (Al-Andalus), and specifically to the colloquial poet Ibn Quzman (Cordoba, 1078–1160). Zajal has close ties in prosody, delivery, form and spirit with various semi-sung colloquial poetry traditions, including such seemingly disparate traditions as nabati and troubadour poetry. Many Near Eastern, Arabian and Mediterranean cultures (including Greece, Algeria, Morocco, Spain and southern France) had, or still have, rich semi-improvised, semi-sung colloquial poetry traditions, which share some traits with Lebanese zajal, such as the verbal duel (e.g. the jeu parti of the troubadours), the use of tambourines or other minimalist percussion instruments, and a chanting chorus of men (Reddadi, in Lebanese) who repeat key verses or refrains recited by the poets.

=== Roots and development ===
The earliest practitioner of zajal in what is present-day Lebanon is thought to be the Bishop Gabriel ibn al-Qilai Al-Hafadi (1440–1516), although some scholarship traces Lebanese zajal back almost two centuries earlier to a poet by the name of Souleiman Al-Ashlouhi (1270–1335) and a few of his contemporaries, and in particular to a single poem in 1289, the year of the destruction of Tripoli (in present north Lebanon) by the Mamluks.

Zajal had its great ascendency as a popular art form in the 19th century when numerous poets contributed to its refinement in content and form. The format of the modern Lebanese zajal evening was set in the 1930s mostly by the master poet Assad Al-Khuri Al-Fghali (1894–1937), known as Shahrur Al-Wadi (Merle of the Valley), who is also credited with introducing many innovations in form and genre. The most common format for a modern evening of Lebanese zajal is a debate (or verbal duel) between two or more poets followed by a recitation of love poetry (ghazal). The format typically consists of recitation in the qasida form (ode), followed by debates in the m3anna and qerradi forms (a popular sub-form of the latter is sometimes called moukhammas mardoud [answered quintain]), leading to ghazal recitations in various forms such as the muwaššah, which, in its Lebanese zajal incarnation, is a joyous and flirtatious genre. The whole is accompanied by a chorus with tambourines and other percussion instruments. The meeting often concludes with a love lament, typically in the Shruqi form.

=== Regional and thematic aspects ===
The regional variation in the appreciation of zajal in Lebanon mirrors to a remarkable extent the ethnic and sectarian fragmentation, which remains despite six decades of national co-habitation. Traditionally cosmopolitan communities (e.g. the Sunnis, Greek Orthodox and Armenians of the littoral cities) have had relatively little affinity for zajal and have produced, with some notable exceptions, few important zajjali. On the other hand, the Maronites, Druze and Shiites who inhabit, or have their roots, in the Lebanese mountains and rural areas, have disproportionately populated the ranks of zajjali over zajal's centuries-long evolution. This regional bias is also reflected in the imagery of zajal, which mirrors more the bucolic and sensual sensibilities of the rural countryside than the cerebral and formal concerns of urban intellectuals. However, many colloquial poets were able to transcend these fluid boundaries and have composed verse that expressively tackles virtually the whole spectrum of humanistic concerns.

=== The language of Lebanese zajal ===
The diglossic nature of the Arabic language in Lebanon—marked by the coexistence of formal and colloquial forms—carries significant ethnic and socio-political implications. This linguistic duality has sparked debates within Lebanon's multi-ethnic and multi-sectarian society regarding whether the colloquial language can serve as an acceptable literary medium, leading to divisive opinions on the matter.

To the ear of a non-Arabic speaker (and sometimes even to that of a native), a phrase spoken in Modern Standard Arabic (fus-ha) and repeated in Lebanese Arabic often sounds substantially different — considerably more so than in the case of, say, classical vs. (spoken) modern Greek. This difference is due, at least partly, to the colloquial having a clear substratum made up of (extinct or semi-extinct) non-Arabic dialects of Levantine Semitic languages, such as Aramaic, Syriac and Canaanite, as well as having later infusions of Persian (e.g. culinary matters), Turkish (e.g. military matters), French and most recently English vocabulary. Starting with the Islamic conquests in the 7th century, which brought classical Arabic to the Levant, the local dialects were naturally, progressively and, eventually, greatly but never completely, replaced by Arabic, but with the influence of other languages still apparent. The ease with which this Arabization occurred is due to the fundamental kinship between Arabic and the local dialects — all being Semitic and thus based on derivations from triconsonantal (triliteral) roots.

=== Status as a literary genre ===
The relegation of the colloquial literature, including zajal, to a sub-literary class was further solidified by the rise of pan-Arabism in the 1950s and 60s at a time when the Lebanese schooling system witnessed its widest expansion and standardization. A consequence of this sociopolitically conditioned diglossia is that the rich canon of colloquial poetry, of which zajal is the foremost embodiment, remains mostly unwritten and practically never part of curricula at schools and universities (although a few post-graduate theses have treated some aspects of the zajal tradition). Today, the majority of the educated Lebanese do not know a m3anna from a qerradi (the two most common metrical forms of zajal) and are likely to be more familiar with a few forms of French prosody (e.g. the sonnet and the ode) taught in many private and even public schools.

Although many audio and video recordings of zajal events have been made, especially on Lebanese TV during the 1960s, 70s and 80s, there has been little effort to properly transcribe or archive these recordings at national or university libraries for serious scholarly research. The elevation of this canon to scholarly attention was not helped by the fact that the cause of colloquial Lebanese was espoused only by ultra-nationalists (especially during the divisive Lebanese Civil War, 1975–1990), who sought to claim a Lebanese culture distinct from that of the Arabs.
