= Georg Freytag =

German philologist (1788–1861)

Georg Wilhelm Friedrich Freytag (19 September 1788 – 16 November 1861) was a German philologist.

== Background ==
Freytag was born in Lüneburg. He studied philology and theology at the University of Göttingen, where from 1811 to 1813 he worked as a theological tutor. In the latter year he accepted an appointment as a sub-librarian at Königsberg. In 1815 he became a chaplain in the Prussian army, and in that capacity visited Paris.

On the proclamation of peace (Treaty of Paris (1815)), Freytag resigned his chaplaincy, and returned to his investigations of Arabic, Persian, and Turkish languages, studying at Paris under Silvestre de Sacy. In 1819 he was appointed to the professorship of oriental languages at the recently founded University of Bonn, a post he maintained up until his death in 1861.

== Published works ==
Freytag's principal work was the acclaimed Lexicon Arabico-Latinum (Halle, 1830–1837), an abridgment of which was published in 1837. The lexicon was an improved and enlarged edition of an earlier work by Jacobus Golius. Other significant writings by Freytag include:

- Selecta ex Historia Halebi, 1819; selections of Ibn al-Adim's history of Aleppo.
- Hamasae Carmina cum Tebrisii scholiis integris by Abu Tammam, 1828–1852 – edition of Arabic songs (2 volumes).
- Darstellung der arabischen Verskunst, 1830 – a treatise on Arabic versification.
- Kurzgefasste Grammatik der hebräischen Sprache, 1835 – a compendium of Hebrew grammar.
- Arabum proverbia; vocalibus instruxit, latine vertit, 1838–1843 – Arabic proverbs (3 volumes). (Translation, original by Meidani, who died 1124)
- Einleitung in das Studium der arabischen Sprache, 1861 – Introduction to the study of Arabic language.
