= Raphelengius =

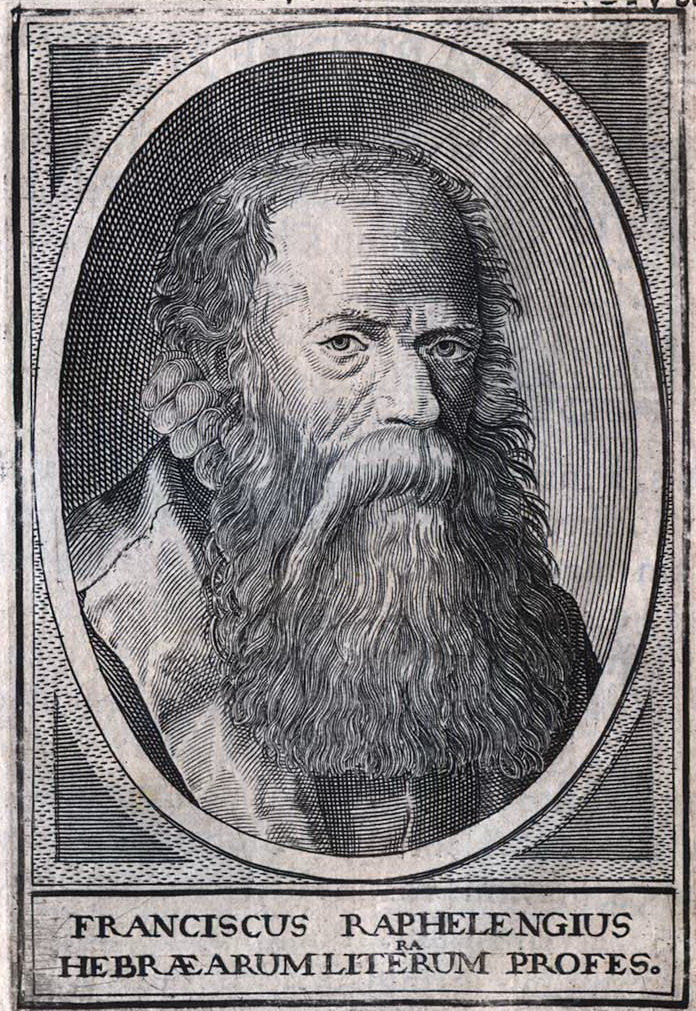
Franciscus Raphelengius

Raphelengius was a family of printers in 16th and 17th century Flanders. The family name is the Latinized form of the Dutch family name van Ravelingen, known from the Flemish place name Ravelingen, today a village in the Belgian harbor city Ostend.

The progenitor, Franciscus Raphelengius the Elder (1539–1597), undertook the operation of his father-in-law Christopher Plantin's printing house in Leiden in 1585. His three sons, Christoph (1566–1600), Franciscus (1568-c. 1643), and Justus (1573–1628), ran the house from the death of their father until 1619. All four were scholars of Oriental languages and published their own books.
