= International Congress of Orientalists =

Series of academic conferences on orientalism

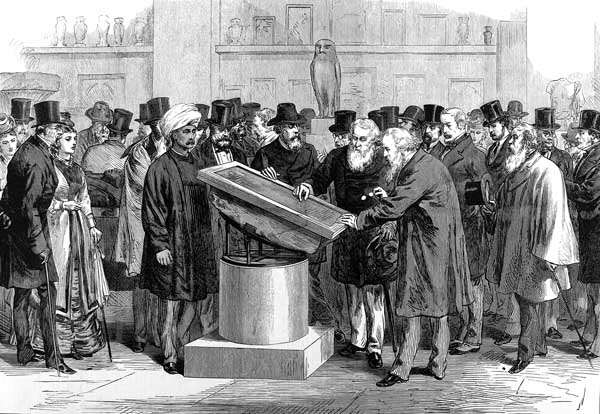
Experts inspecting the Rosetta Stone during the Second International Congress of Orientalists, 1874

The International Congress of Orientalists, initiated in Paris in 1873, was an international conference of Orientalists (initially mostly scholars from Europe and the US). The first thirteen meetings were held in Europe; the fourteenth congress was held in Algiers in 1905 and some of the subsequent conferences were also held outside Europe. Papers were primarily about philology and archaeology. The Proceedings of the Congresses were published. The work of the International Congress of Orientalists is carried on by the International Congress of Asian and North African Studies.

== Congress locations and dates ==
Stamp of India released 26th International Orientalists Congress, New Delhi in 1964.

- 1st International Congress of Orientalists – Paris, 1873
- 2nd International Congress of Orientalists – London, 1874
- 3rd International Congress of Orientalists – St Petersburg, 1876
- 4th International Congress of Orientalists – Florence, 1878
- 5th International Congress of Orientalists – Berlin, 1881
- 6th International Congress of Orientalists – Leiden, 1883
- 7th International Congress of Orientalists – Vienna, 1886
- 8th International Congress of Orientalists – Stockholm and Christiania, 1889
- 9th International Congress of Orientalists – London, 1892
- 10th International Congress of Orientalists – Geneva, 1894
- 11th International Congress of Orientalists – Paris, 1897
- 12th International Congress of Orientalists – Rome, 1899
- 13th International Congress of Orientalists – Hamburg, 1902
- 14th International Congress of Orientalists – Algiers, 1905 – the first Congress outside Europe
- 15th International Congress of Orientalists – Copenhagen, 1908
- 16th International Congress of Orientalists – Athens, 1912
- 17th International Congress of Orientalists – Oxford, 1928
- 18th International Congress of Orientalists – Leiden, 1931
- 19th International Congress of Orientalists – Rome, 1935
- 20th International Congress of Orientalists – Brussels, 1938
- 21st International Congress of Orientalists – Paris, 1948
- 22nd International Congress of Orientalists – Istanbul, 1951
- 23rd International Congress of Orientalists – Cambridge, 1954
- 24th International Congress of Orientalists – Munich, 1957
- 25th International Congress of Orientalists – Moscow, 1960
- 26th International Congress of Orientalists – New Delhi, 1964
- 27th International Congress of Orientalists – Ann Arbor, 1967 – the first Congress in the USA
- 28th International Congress of Orientalists – Canberra, 1971
- 29th International Congress of Orientalists – Paris, 1974

== Proceedings and transactions ==
- 2nd – Report of the proceedings of the second International Congress of Orientalists held in London, 1874 (London, Trübner, 1874). The Rosetta Stone was viewed.
- 3rd – Travaux de la troisième session du Congrès international des orientalistes, St. Pétersbourg, 1876. Edited by W.W. Griegorieff, V. de Rosen. (Санкт Петербург, 1879–80; 2 vols.)
- 4th – Atti del IV congresso internazionale degli orientalisti. Tenuto in Firenze nel settembre 1878. (Firenze, 1881).
- 6th – Actes du sixième Congrès international des orientalistes, tenu en 1883 à Leide. Edited by M.J. de Goeje. (Leiden: E. J. Brill, 1884; 4 vols.).
- 9th – Transactions of the Ninth International Congress of Orientalists. Held in London, 1892. Edited by E. Delmar Morgan. (London, 1893).
- 10th – Report of the Transliteration Committee, about the transliteration of the Arabic, Sanskrit and Pali alphabets. Held in Geneva, 1894.
- 14th – Actes du XIVe Congrès international des orientalistes. Alger, 1905 (Paris, 1906–08).
- 17th – Proceedings of the seventeenth International congress of orientalists, Oxford, 1928 (Nendeln, Liechtenstein : Kraus Reprint, 1968).
- 18th – Actes du XVIII^{e} Congrès international des Orientalistes, Leiden, 7-12 septembre, 1931. Edited by C. Snouck Hurgronje (Leiden: E. J. Brill, 1932; 2 vols.).
- 22nd – Proceedings of the Twenty Second Congress of Orientalists held in Istanbul, September 15 to 22, 1951. Edited by Zeki Velidi Togan (Istanbul, 1953-).
- 23rd – Proceedings of the Twenty-Third International Congress of Orientalists : Cambridge, 21–28 August 1954, ed. Denis Sinor (Nendeln/Liechtenstein : Kraus, 1974).
- 25th – Труды двадцать пятого международного конгресса востоковедов : Москва 9-16 августа 1960 (Proceedings of the Twenty-Fifth International Congress of Orientalists : Moscow 9-16 August 1960). Edited by B.G. Gafurov et al. (Москва, 1962; 4 vols.).
- 26th – Proceedings of the Twenty-Sixth International Congress of Orientalists : New Delhi 4–10 January 1964, ed. R N Dandekar (Poona Bhandarkar Oriental Research Inst. 1970).
- 27th – Proceedings of the Twenty-Seventh International Congress of Orientalists. Ann Arbor, Michigan, 13–19 August 1967. Ed. by Denis Sinor with the assistance of Tania Jacques, Ralph Larson, Mary-Elizabeth Meek (Wiesbaden: Otto Harrassowitz, 1971).
- 28th – Proceedings of the 28 International Congress of Orientalists, Canberra, 6–12 January 1971, edited by A R Davis (Sydney : University of Sydney/Department of Oriental Studies, cop. 1976).
