= Franciscus Raphelengius =

Flemish-born scholar, printer and publisher

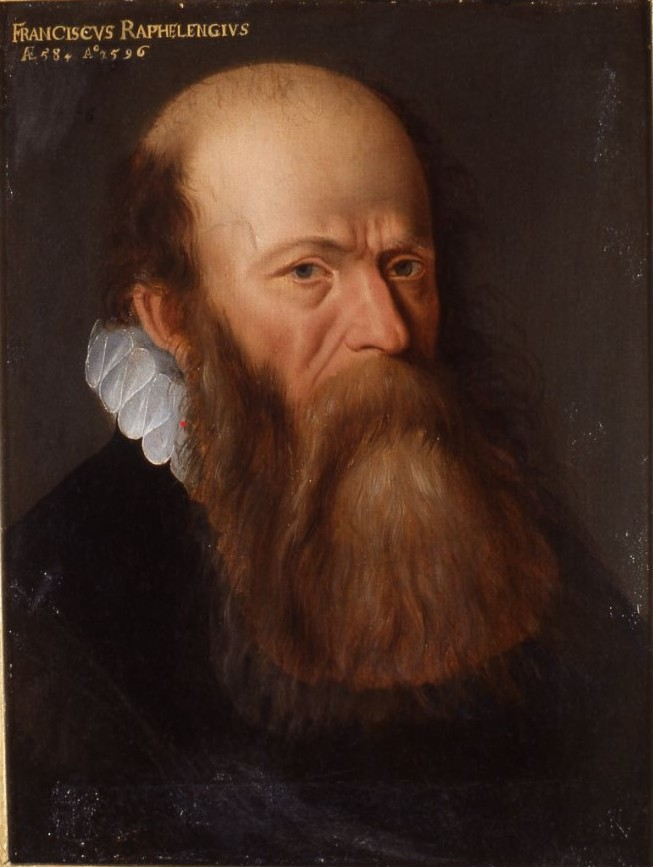
Portrait of Franciscus Raphelengius, c. 1596

Frans van Ravelingen Latinized Franciscus Raphelengius (February 27, 1539 – July 20, 1597), was a Flemish-born scholar, printer and publisher, working in Antwerp and later in Leiden. During the last decade of his life he was professor of Hebrew at Leiden University. He produced an Arabic-Latin dictionary, of about 550 pages, which was published posthumously in 1613 in Leiden. This was the first publication by printing press of a book-length dictionary for the Arabic language in Latin.

== Life ==
Raphelengius was born in Lannoy, then part of the County of Flanders. He first studied in Ghent. His mother, after the death of her husband, intended her son to go into trade and sent him to Nuremberg. Instead he devoted himself to language studies there. Later he studied Greek and Hebrew in Paris, especially under the tutelage of Professor Jean Mercerus. When the civil wars forced him to leave France, he travelled to Cambridge, England, where he may have taught Greek letters.

On his return to the Low Countries in 1564 he stopped in Antwerp to buy books. Believing that he had a disposition for the profession of proofreader, he joined the printer Christopher Plantin as a proofreader. Plantin soon realised the value Raphelengius could have for him due to his ability to read and write Latin, Greek, Hebrew, Chaldean, Siriaque, Arabic, French, Flemish and other languages. Plantin liked him so much that the following year he gave him his daughter Marguerite in marriage.

Raphelengius collaborated on the Plantin Polyglot Bible in which the Bible was printed in Hebrew, Aramaic (Chaldaic), Syriac, Greek, and Latin (published in Antwerp 1569–1573). He later managed the Plantin printing office in Leiden and was official printer for Leiden university. His sons Christopher and Frans continued the Raphelengius printing business. His scholarly printing qualities were one of the attractions that drew Joseph Justus Scaliger to Leiden in 1593.

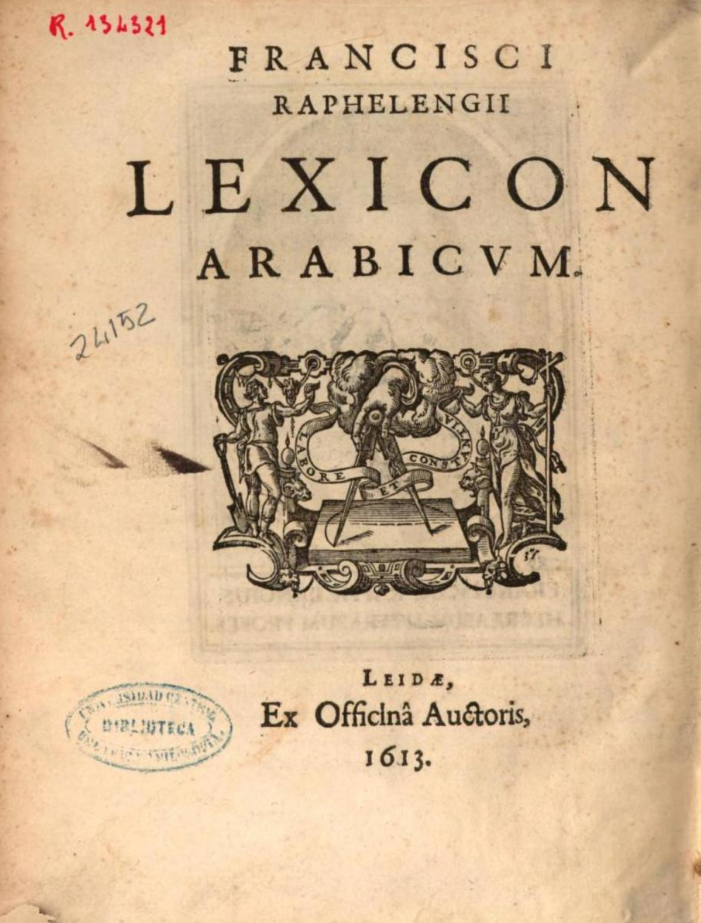
Title page of Lexicon Arabicum by Franciscus Raphelengius published in 1613

Raphelengius had studied Arabic in Antwerp and Leiden, starting in the early 1570s, and was doing it intensively in the early 1590s. His Arabic-to-Latin dictionary was intended for people like himself who were trying to read Arabic texts in Europe. It was later superseded by the 1653 Arabic-to-Latin dictionary of Jacobus Golius.

The first attempt at comparing Indo-European languages came from Raphelengius, who observed that some Persian and Dutch words sounded like each other. Progress stopped at this stage, however, because the older Iranian and Indian languages that would later explain these connections were not discovered until the 19th century.

== Sources ==
- Floor, Willem (1996). "Dutch-Persian relations". In Yarshater, Ehsan (ed.). Encyclopædia Iranica (Online ed.). Encyclopædia Iranica Foundation. ISBN 978-1568590288.
