= Jacobus Golius =

Dutch orientalist and mathematician (1596–1667)

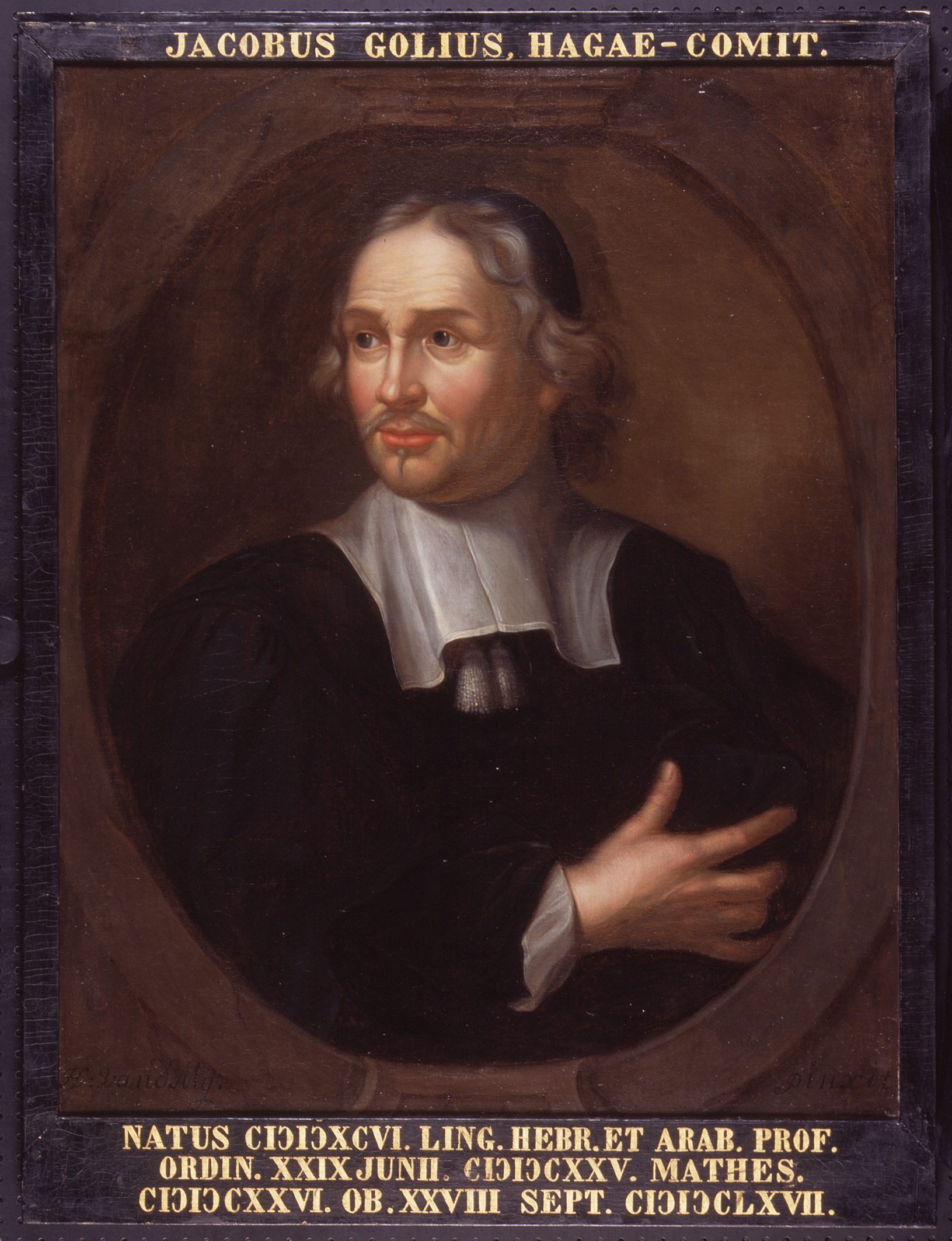
Jacobus Golius

Jacob Golius, born Jacob van Gool (1596 – September 28, 1667), was a Dutch orientalist and mathematician based at the Leiden University in the Netherlands. He is primarily remembered as an Orientalist. He published Arabic texts in Arabic at Leiden, and did Arabic-to-Latin translations. His best-known work is an Arabic-to-Latin dictionary, Lexicon Arabico-Latinum (1653), which he sourced for the most part from the Sihah dictionary of Al-Jauhari and the Qamous dictionary of Fairuzabadi.

== Life ==
Golius was born in The Hague. He went to the University of Leiden in 1612 to study mathematics under Willebrord Snellius. In 1618 he registered again to study Arabic and other Eastern languages at Leiden, where he was the most distinguished pupil of Erpenius. In 1622 he accompanied the Dutch embassy to Morocco, and on his return he was chosen to succeed Erpenius as professor of Arabic at Leiden (1625). In the following year he set out on a tour of the Eastern Mediterranean lands, from which he did not return until 1629. A key purpose of the tour was to collect Arabic and Persian texts and bring them back to the Leiden University library. Jacob also held ownership of a Malay-Dutch dictionary, it was sold to Narcissus Marsh in 1696 who bequethed it to the Bodleian after his death.

The remainder of his life was spent in Leiden where he held the chair of mathematics as well as that of Arabic.

Golius taught mathematics to the French philosopher René Descartes, and later corresponded with him. It is therefore highly probable that he was able to read to him parts of the mathematical Arabic texts he had started to collect, among others on the Conics.

He died in Leiden.

== Publications ==
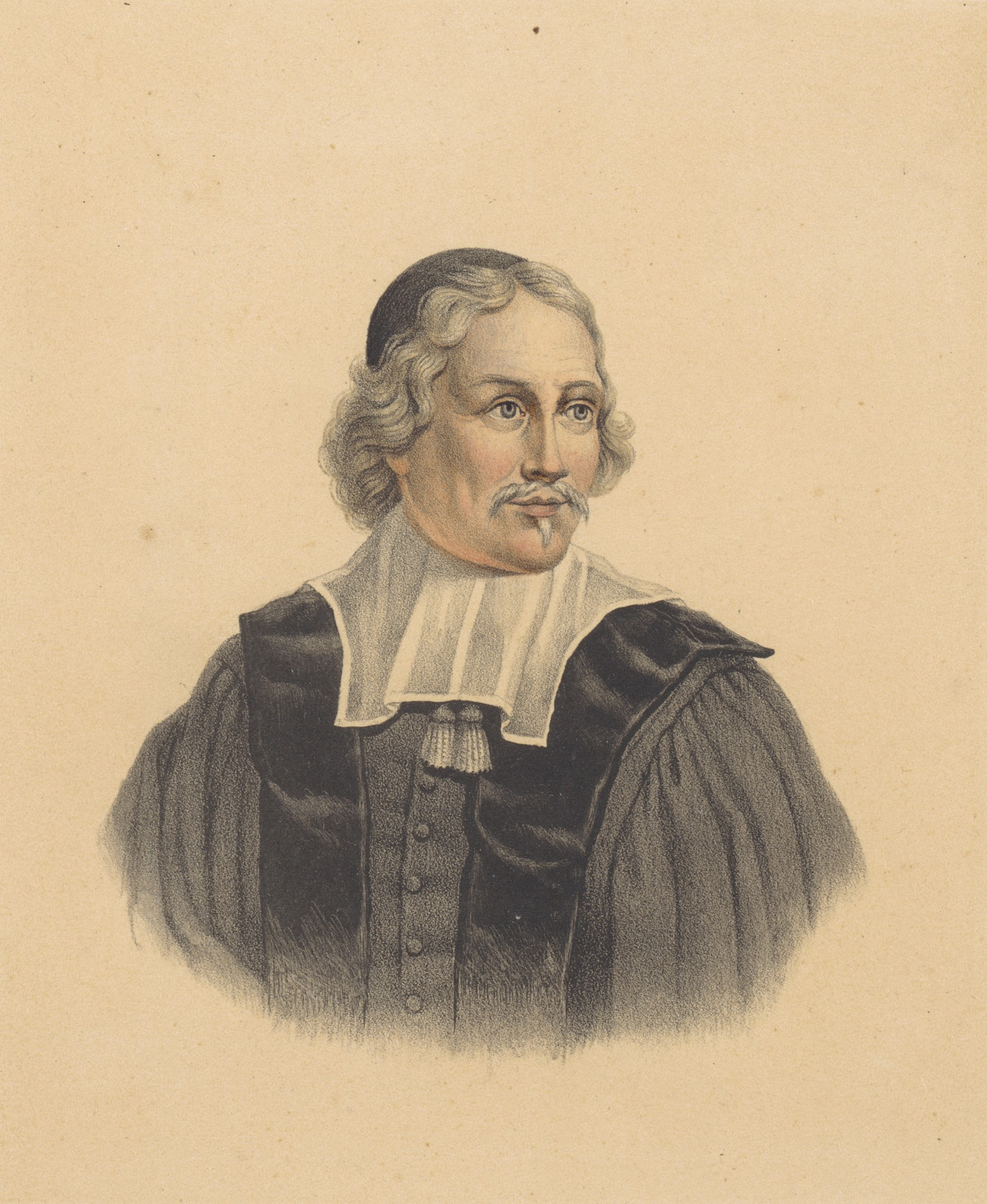
Jacobus Golius

Among his earlier publications may be mentioned editions of various Arabic texts (Proverbia quaedam Alis, imperatoris Muslemici, et Carmen Tograipoetae doctissimi, necnon dissertatio quaedam Aben Synae, 1629; and Ahmedis Arabsiadae vitae et rerum gestarum Timuri, gui vulgo Tamer, lanes dicitur, historia, 1636). In 1656 he published a new edition, with considerable additions, of the Grammatica Arabica of Erpenius. After his death, there was found among his papers a Dictionarium Persico-Latinum which was published, with additions, by Edmund Castell in his Lexicon heptaglotton (1669). Golius also edited, translated and annotated the astronomical treatise of the 9th century Arabic astronomer Al-Farghani.

Golius's Lexicon Arabico-Latinum, about 1500 pages, published at Leiden in 1653, was a big improvement on the Arabic-to-Latin dictionary of Franciscus Raphelengius, which was published at Leiden in 1613. Golius possessed mainstream medieval Arabic dictionaries written solely in Arabic, and was able to translate their contents into Latin. Raphelengius did not have the benefit of seeing these Arabic dictionaries. Golius's dictionary was later improved and expanded by Georg Freytag's Arabic-to-Latin dictionary in 1837.
