= Federico Corriente =

Spanish Arabist and lexicographer (1940–2020)

The Most Excellent Federico Corriente
- Born: Federico Corriente Córdoba; 14 November 1940; Granada, Spain
- Died: 16 June 2020 (aged 79); Zaragoza, Spain

Seat K of the Real Academia Española
- In office 20 May 2018 – 16 June 2020
- Preceded by: Ana María Matute
- Succeeded by: José María Bermúdez de Castro

Federico Corriente Córdoba (14 November 1940 – 16 June 2020) was a Spanish Arabist, lexicographer, academic and member of the Royal Spanish Academy.

Corriente was born in Granada on 14 November 1940. He died in Zaragoza on 16 June 2020 at the age of 79.
