= France and the United Nations =

French Republic

United Nations membership
- Represented by: Provisional Government of the French Republic (1945–1946); French Fourth Republic (1946–1958); French Fifth Republic (1958–present)
- Membership: Full member
- Since: 24 October 1945
- UNSC seat: Permanent
- Permanent Representative: Jérôme Bonnafont

France has been a member of the United Nations (UN) since its foundation in 1945 and is one of the five countries, alongside China, Russia, the United Kingdom, and the United States, that holds a permanent seat on the United Nations Security Council (UNSC), which is responsible for maintaining international peace and security.

France has contributed to the organization over the years through its leadership and sponsorship of various resolutions and other major UN bodies as well as being one of the largest-contributing states to both the general budget and to the peacekeeping operations budget. Several French Presidents have openly spoken of their support for the UN and its aims and there are clear links between France's own policies and the values which the UN espouses, particularly concerning human rights. In the last decade, France has called for, proposed and supported various reforms on the UNSC and their Peacekeeping Operations (PKO). The UN, since its foundation, represents the core of France's engagement with the multilateral international system.

== France and the origins of the UN ==
Despite today being one of the 'Big Five', the five states who are permanent members of the UNSC and hold veto power, France was largely left out of the planning process for the new international organisation tasked with maintaining peace post-WWII, and was only reluctantly added later after most of the planning was done.

The term "United Nations" was first used much earlier than the official 1945 start of the international organization in the 1942 'Declaration of the United Nations', a 26-nation conference (not including France which was under Nazi occupation and thus not legally a government) where governments pledged to continue their fight during WWII against the Axis powers. In a series of conferences and forums over the next few years, mainly behind closed doors, the then 'Big Three' Allied powers of WWII, (the United States, the United Kingdom, and the Soviet Union) began drafting plans for an international organization to maintain international peace, building off the mistakes of the earlier League of Nations. There are several reasons why France was excluded from talks at this stage, the main being that the collapse of France almost overnight in 1940, from which it was still in tatters until at least 1944 (although the effects were felt for much longer), destroyed its great power image. Its decisive defeat by the German army made it difficult to deny that France was simply no longer the political and military power it had once been. This, along with France's relatively limited contribution to the war effort thus far, meant that at least in the eyes of the 'Big Three', France no longer deserved a place at the top table of the new international organization. Furthermore, Roosevelt, the then-leader of the US, along with other high-ranking officials, was suspicious of Charles de Gaulle, the self-proclaimed leader of the Free French and thus hesitant to collaborate with him due to his Napoleonic traits. France was hurt and humiliated by this exclusion especially considering its important role in establishing the League of Nations after WWI. Whilst France was not invited to forums such as Dumbarton Oaks Conference in 1944 (where the US, UK, USSR, and China deliberated over proposals for the functioning of what was to become the UN to present to the other 26 nations), and never formally consulted, they were nonetheless aware such planning was taking place. British Prime Minister Winston Churchill urged American President Franklin Roosevelt to restore France to its status of a major power after the liberation of Paris in August 1944.

Following much negotiation, once France had established and legitimized a new government (the Provisional Government of the French Republic or PGFR, later ceded in 1946 by the Fourth Republic), it was reluctantly granted a permanent spot on the UNSC in the future international organization by weight of its "traditions, ideals and importance" albeit after all-important planning steps had already been negotiated and finalized without its contribution.

However, while France was fairly limited in its contributions to the UN directly during the planning and negotiations, France has for centuries been a key contributor and influencer of liberal ideas and thinking wherein lies the concept of international organisations. Further, the US knew that in order to avoid the ill-fate of the League of Nations, the UN would need effective sanction powers, an idea pushed by France in 1919 during the establishment of the League but which had been rejected by the other Allied powers.

== Role of France at the United Nations ==
As a charter member of the United Nations and one of the five permanent members of the Security Council, France plays an active and integral role in many areas of UN activity. Further, French is one of the two working languages of the UN Secretariat, the other being English.

=== Security Council and peacekeeping ===
As part of the Security Council, France is heavily involved in influencing the debate on various issues threatening international peace and security and drafting various documents, such as resolutions, adopted by the Security Council. In its role at the UNSC and maintaining peace and security, France plays a key role in disarmament in particular, working to advance various treaties and enforce non-proliferation. France’s permanent seat on the UNSC also grants it veto power which it has used and threatened to use several times since the foundation of the International organization to show its disagreement on various resolutions, though notably much less than the other veto-power-holding states (see: France–Iraq relations § Ba'athist Iraq).

=== Veto power in the Security Council ===
France has used its veto power sparingly, vetoing 18 resolutions from 1949 to 2007, compared with 82 by the United States and 123 by the Soviet Union and Russia, 32 by Britain, and 6 by China. France used its veto power along with the United Kingdom, to veto a resolution to resolve the Suez Crisis in 1956. France also used a veto in 1976 on the question of the Comoros independence, when the island of Mayotte was kept in French territory due to the vote of the local population. In 2002, France threatened to veto Resolution 1441 on the then-upcoming 2003 Iraq war.

List of all French vetoes

- June 26, 1946: Spanish Question
- August 25, 1947: Indonesian Question
- October 30, 1956 (twice): Palestinian Question: Steps for the Immediate Cessation of the Military Action of Israel in Egypt
- October 30, 1974: South Africa (Representation in the UN)
- June 6, 1975: Namibia Question
- February 6, 1976: Dispute between the Comoros and France on Mayotte
- October 19, 1976: Situation in Namibia
- October 31, 1977 (three times): Situation in South Africa
- April 30, 1981 (four times) : Question of Namibia
- April 21, 1986: Libyan Complaint against US Attack
- January 11, 1989: Complaint by Libya against US Downing of Aircraft
- December 23, 1989: Situation in Panama

=== Contributions to the UN budget ===
France is also a significant financial contributor to UN activities. Regarding the UN’s 'general budget' which finances personnel, investment, the Secretariat, and other UN field offices, France’s 2019 contribution was 123 million dollars ($USD), a 4.43% share making it the 6th highest contributor. The other mandatory contribution for UN member states to undertake is to the Peacekeeping Operations budget. Along with the other permanent member of the UN Security Council, France is required to take on a more significant share of financial contributions due to their increased involvement in peacekeeping. In the 2019 Peacekeeping operations budget, France was the 6th highest contributor, accounting for a 5.61% share or 381 million dollars ($USD). In addition to these, France also makes voluntary contributions which can be made at the discretion of each member state to UN funds and programs of which they are particularly supportive.

=== Organisational structure ===
France has a Permanent Mission to the UN set up in New York. Their main role lies in the research, preparation, and negotiation of texts, such as Security Council resolutions, which are then debated over and adopted by various UN bodies. The Mission is headed by the Permanent Representative of France to the United Nations who sits on the Security Council, within the General Assembly and all the other bodies where France is represented at the UN, speaking on behalf of France and defending the nation's position and foreign policy at these forums.

The current Permanent Representative of France to the UN is Jérôme Bonnafont who succeeded Nicolas de Rivière and took office as ambassador on 17 March 2025.

=== Environment and climate change ===
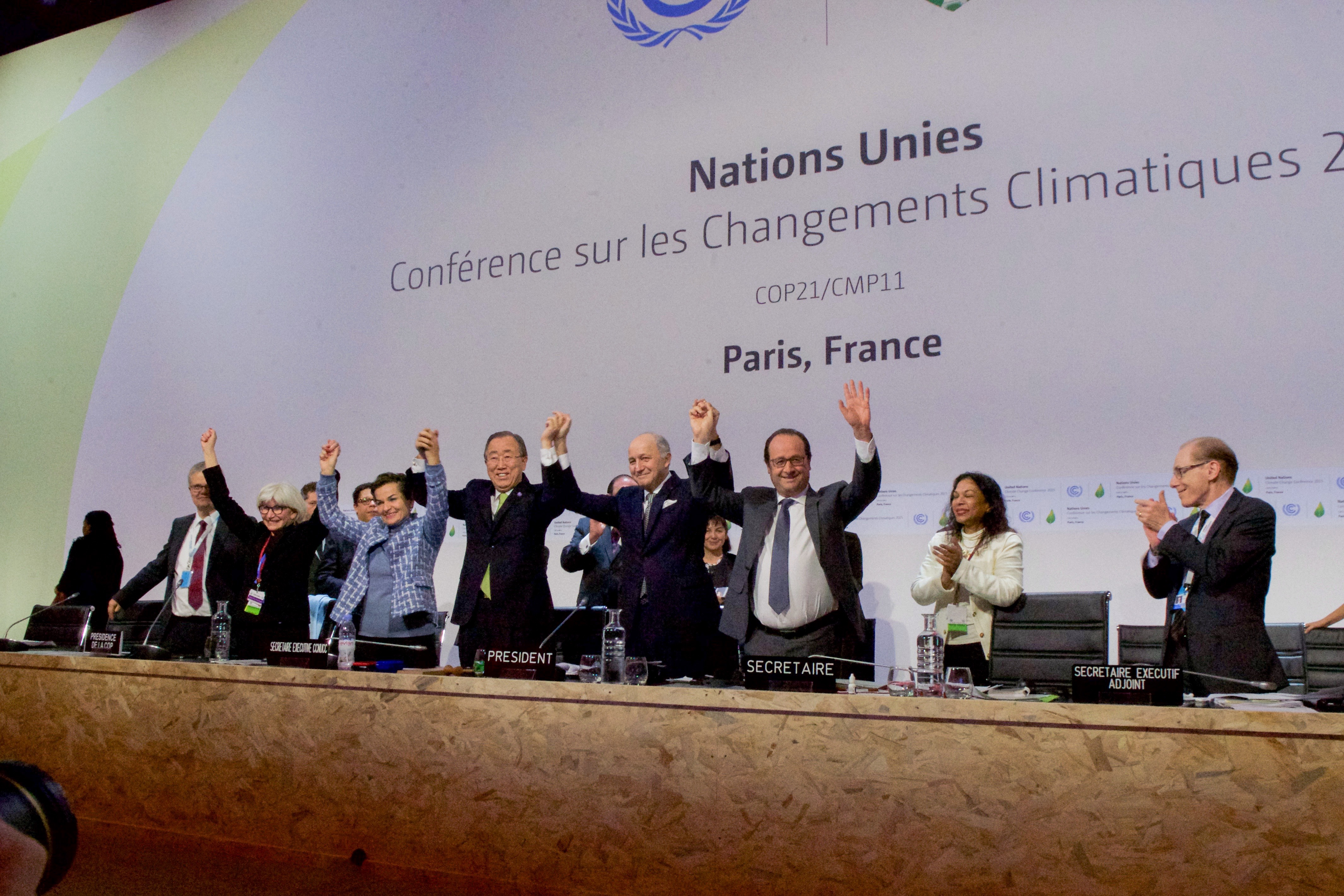
COP21 in Paris - French Foreign Minister, UN Secretary-General Ban, and French President Hollande raise their hands Amafter representatives of 196 countries approved a sweeping environmental agreement.

One issue France is extremely active in within the UN is environmental justice and climate change. France hosted the 2015 UN Paris Climate Conference or COP21 and played a driving role in developing and enacting the Paris Climate Agreement. Beyond specifically climate change, France is also leading the fight for international environmental law, working with experts from 40 countries from around the world in different stages of development and presenting the “Global Pact for the Environment” to the UN. A resolution was adopted by the General Assembly on 10 May 2018.

=== Human rights ===
Human rights are a key focus of the UN and are one of the fundamental principles of the French Republic as a nation and society as well as in its foreign policy. The UN’s Universal Declaration of Human Rights passed in 1948 is partially inspired by France’s own Déclaration des droits de l’Homme et du citoyen from 1789 and many parallels can be drawn between the two. France works with the UN to advocate “the universal and indissociable nature of human rights”. It has consistently played a leading role in this area through its roles on the Human Rights Council (see: § French candidature for the Human Rights Council 2021–2023) and the Security Council. Some UN human rights focus areas France is deeply engaged in are promoting women’s rights, protecting journalists and freedom of the press, combating impunity, arbitrary detention and enforced disappearance, universal abolition of the death penalty, and fighting against child soldier recruitment.

== Future of France–UN relations ==
=== French candidature for the Human Rights Council 2021–2023 ===
France and the United Nations share a long-standing commitment to universal human rights. The Human Rights Council (UNHRC) is a body within the UN made up of 47 states which are responsible for advocating and defending human rights throughout the world. The 47 member states are elected for three-year terms by the UN General Assembly and seats are distributed based on equitable geographical distribution. Since the UNHRC was founded in 2006, France has been a member three times (2006–2008, 2009–2011, 2014–2016) and plays an active role in UNHCR missions even when it is not a member. France is determined to promote humanist diplomacy in response to new 21st century threats and violations it sees to universal human rights. As such, on 22 February 2020, France Diplomacy announced its candidacy to the Human Rights Council for the 2021–2023 term on Twitter. Four days later, on 26 February, Jean-Yves Le Drian, the French Minister for Europe and Foreign Affairs, presented France's candidacy for the council at the opening of its 43rd session in Geneva:

"Institutions and the very principle of multilateralism are exposed to unprecedented attempts at destabilization. France won't resign itself to seeing fundamental rights flouted, democracy weakened, or multilateralism dismantled. On the contrary, we'll continue to defend human rights by every means and in every forum where our voice can be heard. This is why France is putting forward its candidacy for the Human Rights Council for the 2021-2023 term." – Jean-Yves Le Drian, Minister for Europe and Foreign Affairs.

France's 2021–2023 candidacy has three key priorities to guide its actions which fall in line with UN values:

1. Strengthening international mobilization for women's rights.
2. Protecting those who defend human rights, often at risk to their own lives.
3. Defending the fundamentals of democracy, including ensuring the safety of journalists and the right to reliable information.

UNHRC supposed to only accept members who are truly committed to human rights and are not abusing human rights themselves. With other candidates like Russia, Cuba and Saudi Arabia applying, which are authoritarian to varying degrees and do not hold high standards of in the promotion of human rights themselves in their domestic and foreign policies, it is likely France will be elected over such countries. Though France is not immune of rights abuse concerns from the UN, such as over their counter-terrorism laws, according to the UNHRC, it remains one of the countries most committed to universal human rights.

=== UN reform ===
France has been a key stakeholder in recent calls for UN reform to make the organization more efficient and more representative of the current world order which has changed immensely since the end of WWII when UN structures were established. Multilateralism is now under the threat of power politics and France has been vocal about the need to fix this through reform of the UN. There are 3 main areas of reform France has proposed or supported over the last decade.

1. France has called for reform of the UNSC, suggesting an expansion of the number of permanent seats on the UNSC to include the G4 countries (Germany, Brazil, India and Japan) as well as a greater presence of African member states in both permanent and non-permanent positions
2. France proposed a governing of the use of veto power in the UN when concerning issues of mass atrocities. This initiative, which was started in 2013, is endorsed by over 100 countries as of November 2019.
3. France supports Secretary-General António Guterres's peacekeeping reform proposal which calls for better funding and better functioning of UN Peacekeeping Operations (PKO) so that they are more effective in achieving their aims.

=== EU vs France for UNSC seat ===
In recent years, there have been calls, primarily from Germany, for France to give up its seat as a permanent member of the UNSC and be replaced with an EU seat (veto power included). Germany’s argument is that having a permanent EU seat on the Security Council would enable the European bloc to speak with one, the united voice at the international platform. Article 34 of the Treaty on the European Union states that member states must uphold the position of the Union at any international organizations, conferences or forums of the like in their actions, hence, Germany argues that if France truly was committed to the EU, this spot and the associated veto power should be Europeanised. These calls follow concerns for the future of Europe on the global stage following Brexit, which leaves Europe with just one seat on the council. The position of France, as well as other policy analysts in the EU, is that if Germany’s objective is truly to better represent Europe’s position on the global stage as they claim, this merged EU seat would be counterproductive. Instead, just as France has been advocating for (see: § UN Reform) the addition of more permanent seats on the UNSC held by European countries would mean more collective voting power and input in important UN resolutions and debate. Given that France is the diplomatic power of the EU whilst Germany represents the economic capital of the EU – together they counter-balance each other. Such a Europeanisation of France’s diplomatic strength in holding this UNSC seat could offset this balance into the hands of Germany and throw off this Franco-German equilibrium which is at the core of European integration and peace. Thus, it is unlikely that France will cede its UNSC seat and veto power to the EU or that the UN will allow this, however it is plausible that France will continue to push for UN reform for Germany and the other G4 countries to join the ‘Big Five’ and become permanent, veto-power holding, members of the UNSC.

== See also ==
- France and the League of Nations
- European Union and the United Nations
- Permanent Mission of France to the United Nations
- Ministry of Europe and Foreign Affairs
