= François Delattre =

French diplomat (born 1963)

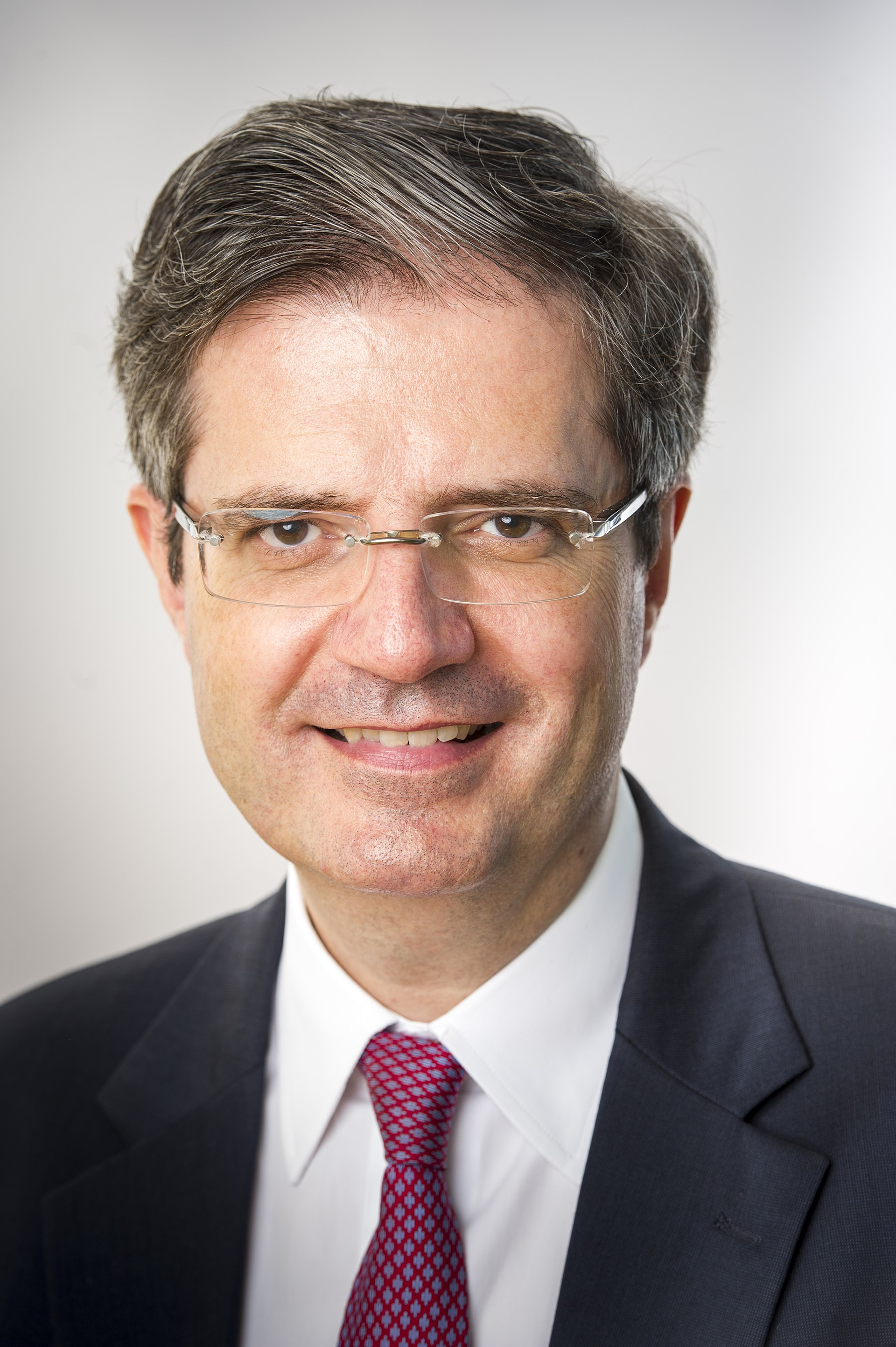

Ambassador of France to Germany
- Incumbent
- Assumed office 30 August 2022
- President: Emmanuel Macron
- Preceded by: Anne-Marie Descôtes

President of the United Nations Security Council
- In office 1 March 2019 – 31 March 2019
- Secretary-General: António Guterres
- Preceded by: Anatolio Ndong Mba; Teodoro Obiang Nguema Mbasogo
- Succeeded by: Christoph Heusgen

Permanent Representative of France to the United Nations
- In office 15 July 2014 – 8 July 2019
- President: François Hollande; Emmanuel Macron
- Secretary-General: Ban Ki-moon; António Guterres
- Preceded by: Gérard Araud
- Succeeded by: Nicolas de Rivière

Ambassador of France to the United States
- In office 23 February 2011 – 18 September 2014
- President: Nicolas Sarkozy; François Hollande
- Preceded by: Pierre Vimont
- Succeeded by: Gérard Araud

Ambassador of France to Canada
- In office 26 June 2008 – 19 September 2011
- President: Nicolas Sarkozy
- Preceded by: Daniel Jouanneau
- Succeeded by: Philippe Zeller

Personal details
- Born: François Marie Delattre; 15 November 1963 (age 62) Saint-Marcellin, France
- Education: Sciences Po; École nationale d'administration
- Profession: Diplomat

François Marie Delattre (French pronunciation: [fʁɑ̃swa dəlatʁ]; born 15 November 1963) is a French diplomat and senior civil servant who has been serving as France’s Ambassador to Germany since 2022.

From 2019 to 2022, Delattre served as Secretary General of the Ministry of Europe and Foreign Affairs under ministers Jean-Yves Le Drian and Catherine Colonna. He previously was France's ambassador to the United States from 2011 to 2014 and permanent representative to the United Nations in New York City and head of France's UN mission from 2014 until 2019.

== Family and education ==
François Delattre is the grandnephew of André Boulloche, a hero of the French Resistance and concentration camp survivor who, after the war, became one of the pioneers of Franco-German reconciliation and European integration. He is the son of Louis Delattre, an industrialist who, alongside Ambroise Roux, was one of the leaders of the former Compagnie Générale d'Électricité.

François Delattre is a former student of the École nationale d'administration (1989), a graduate of the Institut d'études politiques de Paris, and a graduate in international law from Panthéon-Sorbonne University. He also has a degree in German from LMU Munich.

== Career ==
A diplomat, François Delattre began his career at the French Embassy in Bonn (1989-1991), where he witnessed the fall of the Berlin Wall and German reunification. He was in charge of Germany's integration, particularly economic integration, in the context of reunification. He then headed the strategic unit at the Quai d'Orsay within the Ministry's Strategic Affairs and Disarmament Directorate (1991-1993).

As technical advisor to the office of Foreign Minister Alain Juppé (1993-1995), he was responsible, alongside Bruno Racine, for transatlantic defense and security issues and for monitoring the crisis in Bosnia. He was responsible for the same issues at the Elysée Palace as part of President Jacques Chirac's diplomatic team (1995-1998), alongside Jean-David Levitte, which gave him first-hand experience of the management of the Bosnian crisis, from President Chirac's turning point (the recapture of the Vrbanja bridge, the establishment of the European Rapid Reaction Force) to the signing of the Dayton-Paris Accords in December 1995.

François Delattre then headed the press and communications department at the French Embassy in Washington (1998-2002), which led him to develop a large network of contacts among American journalists and to increase his appearances in the American media to promote French and European positions.

He then served as deputy chief of staff to Foreign Minister Dominique de Villepin (2002-2004), alongside Pierre Vimont, where he had a front-row seat to the Iraq War and the launch of negotiations on Iran's nuclear program.

As French Consul General in New York (2004-2008), he placed particular emphasis on promoting the activities of French nationals in New York and strengthening ties with the American business community and the Jewish community. He became friends with the former U.S. Ambassador to France, Felix Rohatyn, who opened many doors for him.

As French Ambassador to Canada (2008-2011), he worked to strengthen France's presence throughout the country, particularly in Western Canada, where France had traditionally had less of a presence, while ensuring that a special relationship with Quebec was also strengthened. He developed good contacts with Mark Carney, then Governor of the Bank of Canada, who went on to become his country's Prime Minister.

As French Ambassador to Washington, D.C., for nearly four years (2011-2014), he worked with the Obama administration to give new impetus to the Franco-American partnership, with a particular focus on the economy, innovation, and university partnerships. President François Hollande's state visit to the United States in February 2014, during which he visited Silicon Valley, was an expression of this new momentum. François Delattre was also a direct witness to President Obama's reluctance to get involved in the conflict in Syria, which he confided in him.

After Washington, he was appointed ambassador and permanent representative of the French Republic to the United Nations (2014-2019) and in his capacity chaired the U.N. Security Council on several occasions. In this position, he strengthened Franco-German and European coordination at the United Nations and established good working relations with the two successive US ambassadors, Samantha Power and then Nikki Haley.

Close to members of the US Congress, both Republican and Democrat, and to former Secretary of State John Kerry, with whom he negotiated directly a resolution against Daesh following the Paris attacks, François Delattre was the first to mention to journalists, off the record, the possibility of a Donald Trump victory.

In 2018, after the chemical attack in Douma, Syria, he stated that the symptoms were "typical of exposure to a powerful nerve agent, combined with chlorine to increase its lethal effect," that "only the Syrian armed forces have a military interest in using them," and that "these attacks therefore took place either with Russia's tacit or explicit agreement, or despite its presence and against its will," thus advocating a strong response.

During the 2019 UN vote on a resolution concerning sexual violence against women, he criticized the position taken by the United States. Under threat of a veto, the U.S. administration succeeded in removing references to women who become pregnant as a result of rape from the text, in order to discourage recourse to abortion.

As he was leaving New York, he published an op-ed in the New York Times on July 7, 2019 https://www.nytimes.com/2019/06/13/opinion/france-united-states.html, during Trump's first term, in the form of a bipartisan call for America to remain engaged in world affairs and multilateral forums, in keeping with its democratic ideals.

As Secretary General of the Ministry of Foreign Affairs from July 1, 2019, to August 29, 2022, he helped steer the Quai d'Orsay and its network during the COVID-19 pandemic and worked to strengthen the role of the Secretary General in major diplomatic issues, alongside his management and administrative duties. He established regular consultations with his main foreign counterparts, which proved particularly useful in enabling a concerted European and Euro-American response after the outbreak of Russian military aggression in Ukraine.

He then became Ambassador to Germany (since September 2022).

== Other activities ==
=== Corporate boards ===
- Orano, Independent Member of the Board of Directors (since 2020)

=== Non-profit organizations ===
- École nationale d'administration (ENA), Ex-Officio Member Board of Directors (since 2019)
- Institute of Advanced Studies in National Defence (IHEDN), Member of the Board of Directors
- United Nations International School (UNIS), Honorary Trustee (2014–2019)

== Honours ==
=== National ===
- Knight of the Legion of Honour (2010)
- Commander of the Ordre national du Mérite (2025)

=== Foreign ===
- Commander of the Order of Merit of the Italian Republic (2021)
- Knight Grand Cross of the Order of the Star of Italy (2022)
- Order of the Rising Sun, 2nd Class, Gold and Silver Star (2023)
