= Permanent Representative of France to the United Nations =

French ambassador to the United Nations

Ambassador and Permanent Representative of France to the United Nations
- Arms of France

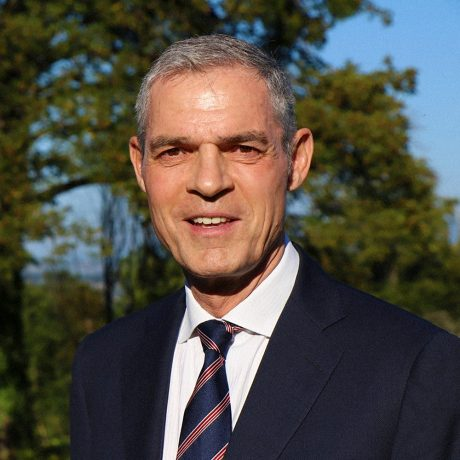
- Incumbent; Jérôme Bonnafont since 17 March 2025
- Style: His Excellency/Mr. Ambassador
- Appointer: President of France
- Formation: 1946; 80 years ago
- Website: Permanent Mission of France to the United Nations

The role of the ambassador and permanent representative of France to the United Nations (French: ambassadeur et représentant permanent de la France auprès des Nations Unies) is the head of the French delegation to the United Nations in New York and the head of the Permanent Mission of France to the UN. The position carries the rank and status of an ambassador extraordinary and plenipotentiary and includes representation of France on the United Nations Security Council.

The permanent representative, currently Jérôme Bonnafont, represents France in the Security Council and in plenary meetings of the General Assembly, except when representation is assumed by a more senior authority, such as the Minister for Europe and Foreign Affairs, the Prime Minister or the President.

== Ambassador ==
Jérôme Bonnafont took up his post as Ambassador and Permanent Representative of France to the United Nations in New York on 17 March 2025.

Prior to this appointment, he served as Ambassador and Permanent Representative of France to the United Nations Office in Geneva and international organizations in Switzerland from September 2021. Concurrently, he acted as rapporteur-general of the États généraux de la diplomatie, a national consultation launched by President Emmanuel Macron and Minister for Europe and Foreign Affairs Catherine Colonna, which led to the March 2023 reform plan aimed at strengthening France's diplomatic network.

His previous assignments include serving as advisor to Prime Minister Édouard Philippe in 2020, Director of the North Africa and Middle East Department at the Ministry for Europe and Foreign Affairs (2015–2019), Ambassador to Spain (2012–2015), Chief of Staff to Minister for Foreign Affairs Alain Juppé (2011–2012), and Ambassador to India (2007–2011). Between 1997 and 2007, he was advisor for global affairs and spokesperson for the Presidency under President Jacques Chirac.

A graduate of the Denis Diderot class of the École nationale d'administration (ENA, 1986), Bonnafont has held numerous diplomatic and administrative posts, including assignments in New Delhi, Kuwait, the Permanent Mission of France to the United Nations in New York, the Department of Legal Affairs, and the Ministry of the Environment.

== Officeholders ==
Image	Incumbent	Start of term	End of term
	Joseph Paul-Boncour (Chairman of Delegation)	1945	1946
	Alexandre Parodi	1946	1949
	Jean Chauvel	1949	1952
	Henri Hoppenot	1952	1955
	Hervé Alphand	1955	1956
	Bernard Cornut-Gentille	1956	1956
	Guillaume Georges-Picot	1956	1959
	Armand Bérard (first term)	1959	1962
	Roger Seydoux	1962	1967
	Armand Bérard (second term)	1967	1970
	Jacques Kosciusko-Morizet	1970	1972
	Louis de Guiringaud	1972	1976
	Jacques Leprette	1976	1981
	Luc de La Barre de Nanteuil	1981	1984
	Claude de Kémoularia	1984	1987
	Pierre-Louis Blanc	1987	1991
	Jean-Bernard Mérimée	1991	1995
	Alain Dejammet	1995	1999
	Jean-David Levitte	1999	2002
	Jean-Marc de La Sablière	2002	2007
	Jean-Maurice Ripert	2007	2009
	Gérard Araud	2009	2014
	François Delattre	2014	2019
	Nicolas de Rivière	2019	2025
	Jérôme Bonnafont	2025	present

== See also ==
- France and the United Nations
- Foreign relations of France
