= List of ambassadors of France to Russia =

This is an incomplete list of ambassadors from France to Russia.

== Eighteenth century ==
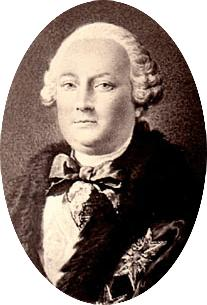
Marquis de La Chétardie

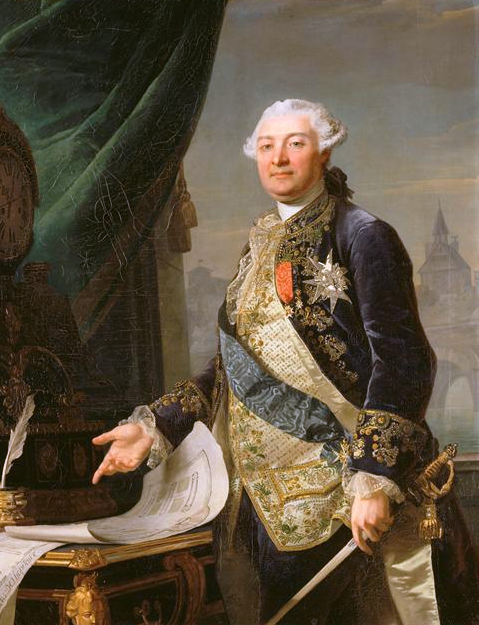
Baron de Breteuil

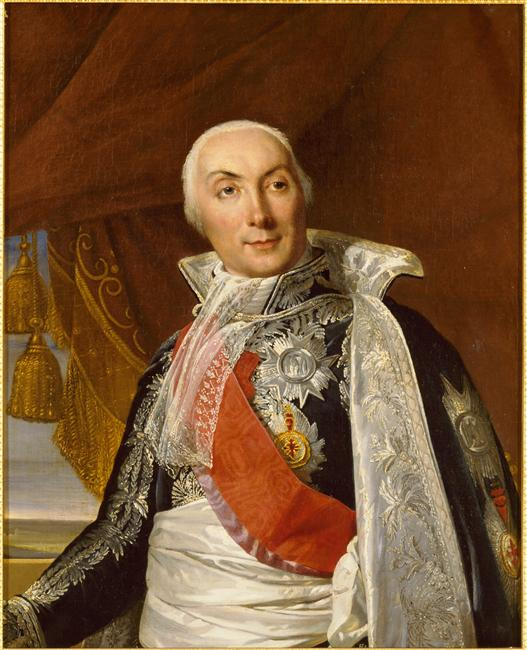
Comte de Ségur
- 1702–1713 Jean-Casimir Baluze
- 1713 Lavie (Levisson)
- 1721 de Campredon
- 1727–1733 Magnan
- 1734 Édouard Salomon Fonton de l'Etang-la-Ville
- 1739–1743 Jacques-Joachim Trotti, marquis de La Chétardie
- 1742–1748 Louis d'Usson de Bonnac, comte d'Alion (1743-1747 de Saint-Sauveur (consul))
- 1755 chevalier Douglas
- 1757 Paul-Gallucio, marquis de L'Hospital
- 1760–1764 Louis Auguste Le Tonnelier de Breteuil
- 1772–1774 François-Michel Durand de Distroff
- 1774 Charles-Louis Le Clerc, marquis de Juigné
- 1782–1784 Charles Olivier de Saint-Georges de Vérac
- 1785–1789 Louis Philippe de Ségur
- 1790–1791 René Eustache d'Osmond
- 1789–1792 Edmond-Charles Genêt

From 1791 to 1796, in the context of non-recognition of the revolutionary government in Paris, Catherine II accredited Count Valentin Esterházy, envoy of the Dukes of Provence and Artois as minister of emigrants and French in exile. Conversely, Russia delegates and accredits the Count of Roumiantsev to the princes established in Koblenz. Under the reign of Paul I, Count Esterházy was succeeded by the Marquis de La Ferté-Meung (1796-1799), briefly succeeded by the Viscount of Caraman (1799-1800). The representation of the French princes (which from 1795 became that of Louis XVIII, king of France in exile), will end with the death of Tsar Paul I and the normalization of diplomatic relations between Russia and France following the Treaty of Tilsit in 1807.

== Nineteenth century and early twentieth century ==
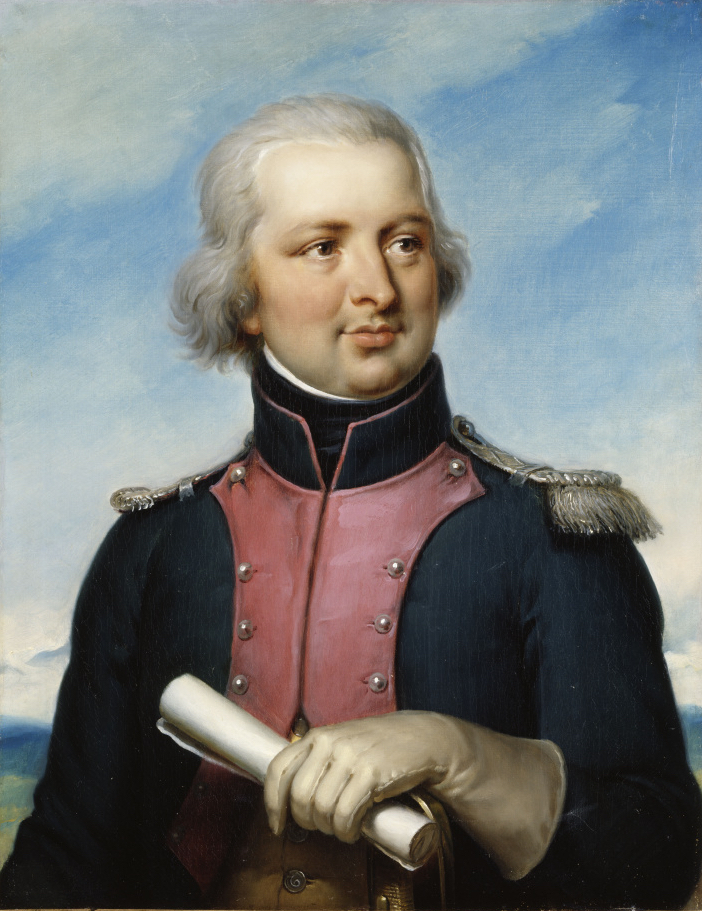
Comte d'Hédouville

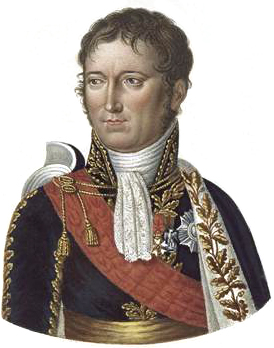
Duc de Trévise

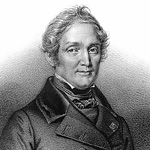
Baron de Barante

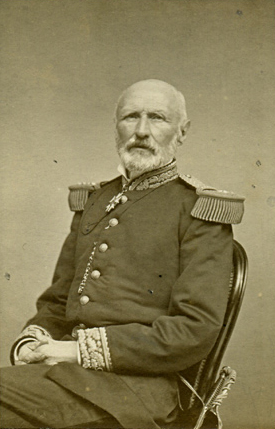
Adolphe Le Flô

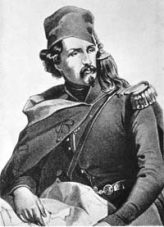
Christophe de Lamoricière

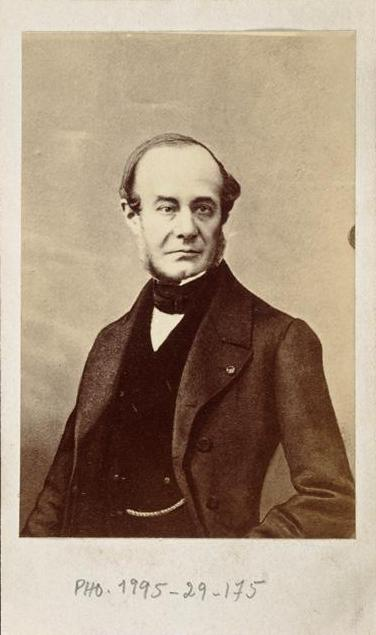
Duc de Montebello

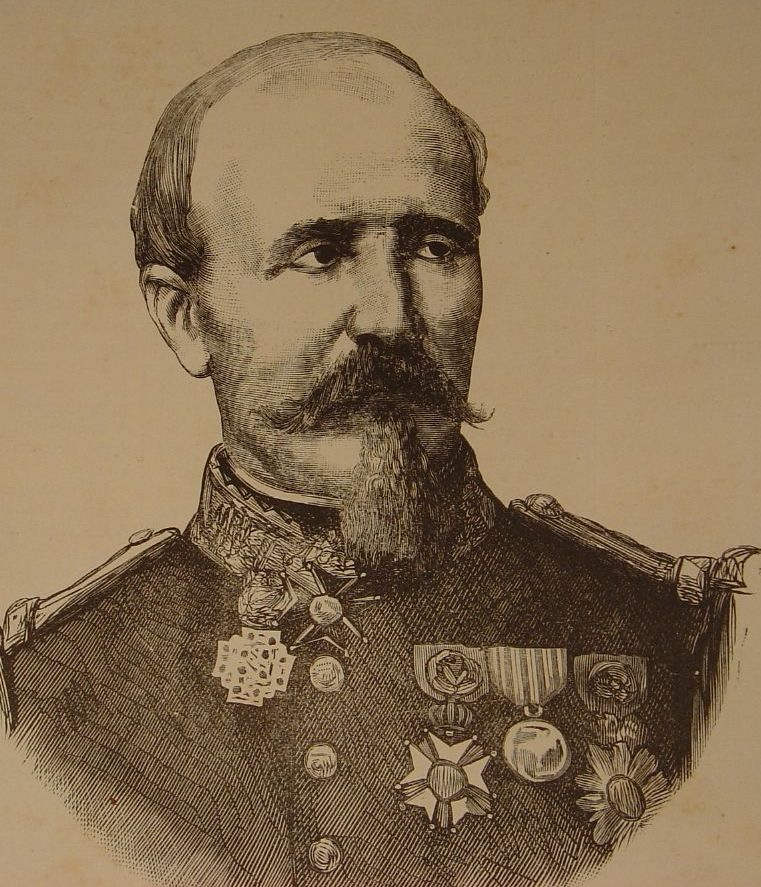
Antoine Chanzy

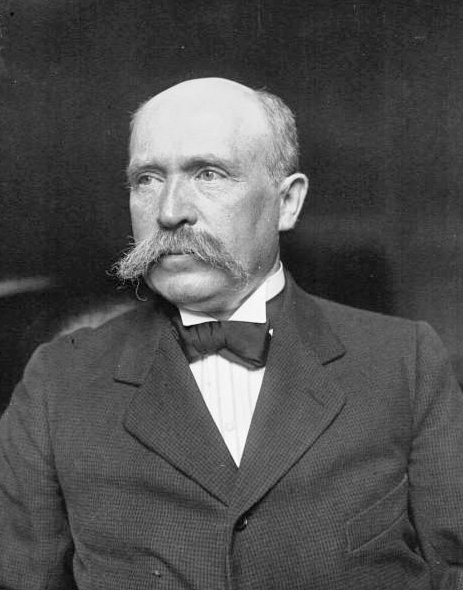
Joseph Noulens
- 1792–1812 Barthélemy de Lesseps
- 1801–1804 Gabriel, comte d'Hédouville
- 1807 Anne Jean Marie René Savary
- 1807–1811 Armand Caulaincourt
- 1811–1812 Jacques Alexandre Law de Lauriston
- 1814–1819 Achille Charles Victor de Noailles
- 1820–1827 Auguste, comte de La Ferronays
- 1828–1830 Casimir Louis Victurnien de Rochechouart de Mortemart
- 1830–1831: Édouard Adolphe Casimir Joseph Mortier
- 1832 prince de Trévise
- 1832–1835: Nicolas Joseph Maison
- 1835–1848 Prosper Brugière de Barante
- 1849 Adolphe Emmanuel Charles Le Flô (persona non grata in 1851)
- 1849 Christophe Louis Léon Juchault de Lamoricière, ambassadeur extraordinaire
- 1849–1854 Général de Castelbajac
- 1856–1857 Charles, duc de Morny, ambassadeur extraordinaire
- 1857–1858 Alphonse de Rayneval
- 1858–1864 Louis Napoléon Lannes
- 1864–1869 Charles de Talleyrand-Périgord
- 1869–1870 Émile Félix Fleury
- 1870–1879 Adolphe Emmanuel Charles Le Flô
- 1879–1882 Antoine Chanzy
- 1882–1883 Benjamin Jaurès
- 1883–1886 Félix Antoine Appert
- 1886–1891 Paul Lefebvre de Laboulaye
- 1891–1902 Gustave Lannes de Montebello
- 1902–1908 Maurice Bompard
- 1908–1913 Georges Louis
- 1913–1914 Théophile Delcassé
- 1914–1917 Maurice Paléologue
- 1917–? M. Doulet (Chargé d'Affaires)
- 1917–1920? Joseph Noulens

== Soviet Union ==
- 1924–1932 Jean Herbette
- 1933–1936 Charles Alphand
- 1936–1939 Robert Coulondre
- 1939–1940 Paul-Émile Naggiar
- 1940–1941 Eirik Labonne
- 1941 Gaston Bergery
- Official end to the diplomatic relations between the Soviet Union and the Vichy Government following the latter's support of the German Operation Barbarossa
- During the war the French National Committee was represented in the Soviet Union by Roger Garreau
- 1945–1948 Georges Catroux
- 1948–1952 Yves Chataigneau
- 1952–1955 Louis Joxe
- 1955–1964 Maurice Dejean
- 1964–1966 Philippe Baudet
- 1966–1968 Olivier Wormser
- 1968–1973 Roger Seydoux
- 1973–1976 Jacques Vimont
- 1976–1979 Bruno de Leusse
- 1979–1981 Henri Froment-Meurice
- 1981–1984 Claude Arnaud
- 1985–1986 Jean-Bernard Raimond
- 1986–1988 Yves Pagniez
- 1989–1991 Jean-Marie Mérillon
- 1991–1992 Bertrand Dufourcq

== Post-Soviet Russia ==
- 1991–1992 Bertrand Dufourcq
- 1992–1996 Pierre Morel
- 1996–2000 Hubert Colin de Verdière
- 2000–2003 Claude Blanchemaison
- 2003–2006 Jean Cadet
- 2006–2009 Stanislas de Laboulaye
- 2009–2013 Jean de Gliniasty
- 2013–2017 Jean-Maurice Ripert
- 2017–2019 Sylvie Bermann
- 2020–2024 Pierre Lévy
- 2025-present Nicolas de Rivière
