= Jean de Gliniasty =

French diplomat

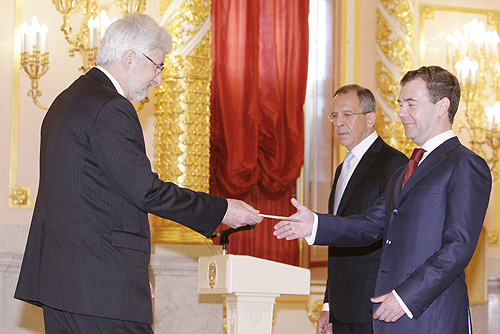
- de Gliniasty presenting his credentials to Dmitry Medvedev in May 2009

Ambassador of France to Russia
- In office 2009–2013
- President: Nicolas Sarkozy; François Hollande
- Preceded by: Stanislas Lefebvre de Laboulaye
- Succeeded by: Jean-Maurice Ripert

Personal details
- Born: 27 September 1948 (age 78) Lyon, France
- Education: Sciences Po; ÉNA

Jean de Gliniasty (born 27 September 1948, Lyon) is a French diplomat and was Ambassador of France to Russia, from 2009 until October 2013. He presented his credentials to Russian president Dmitry Medvedev on 29 May 2009.

== Biography ==
Jean de Gliniasty graduated from the Sciences Po (1971, Public Service section), holds a master's degree in law and a bachelor's degree in arts, and is a former student of the École nationale d'administration (Léon Blum class).

He served as advisor to the French Permanent Representation to the European Union, Consul General of France in Jerusalem, Ambassador of France to Senegal (1999–2003), Ambassador of France to Brazil (2003–2006), and List of ambassadors of France to Russia (2009–2013).

He has held various positions at the headquarters of the Ministry for Europe and Foreign Affairs (France) (Deputy Head of the Analysis and Forecasting Center, Deputy Director for Economic Cooperation, Deputy Director for North Africa, Director for Scientific, Technical, Educational, and Development Cooperation, Director for the United Nations and International Organizations, Director for Africa).

He left public service in 2013.

He considers President Vladimir Putin absence from the D-Day ceremonies in England and France in June 2019 to be “incomprehensible.”

On March 11, 2021, speaking as an expert, he told the TASS news agency that “The Sputnik V vaccine is an exceptional scientific, medical, and geopolitical achievement for Russia.”
