= Maurice Gourdault-Montagne =

French diplomat

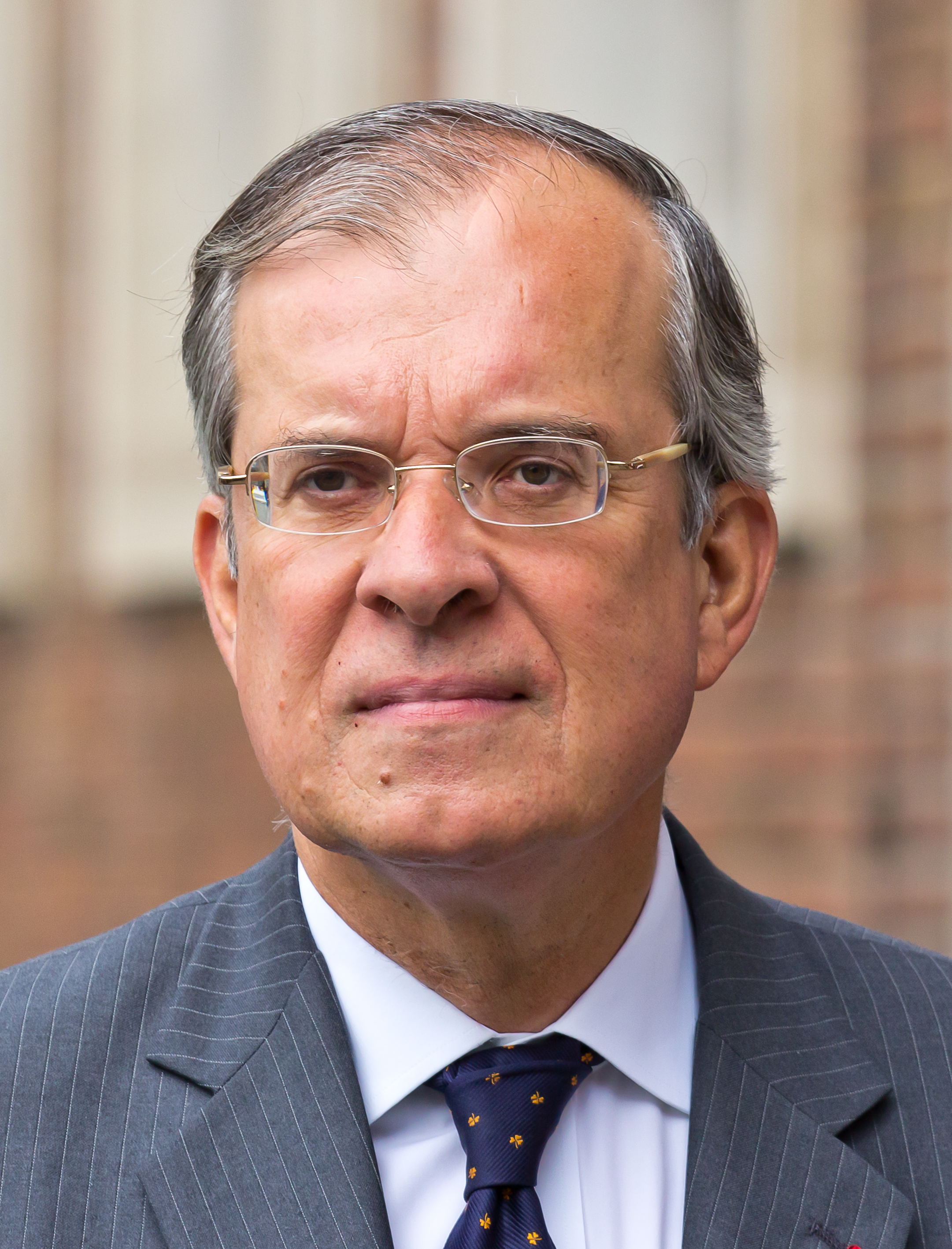
- Maurice Gourdault-Montagne (2012)

Ambassador of France to China
- In office 20 August 2014 – 2017
- President: François Hollande
- Preceded by: Sylvie Bermann
- Succeeded by: Jean-Maurice Ripert

Ambassador of France to Germany
- In office 2011–2014
- President: Nicolas Sarkozy; François Hollande
- Preceded by: Bernard de Montferrand
- Succeeded by: Philippe Étienne

Ambassador of France to the United Kingdom
- In office 2007–2011
- President: Nicolas Sarkozy
- Preceded by: Gérard Errera
- Succeeded by: Bernard Émié

Personal details
- Born: 16 November 1953 (age 72) Paris, France
- Education: Sciences Po; Panthéon-Assas University
- Profession: Diplomat

Maurice Gourdault-Montagne CMG, CVO (born on 16 November 1953) is a career diplomat and former French Ambassador to China, Japan, the United Kingdom and Germany.

== Career ==
Gourdault-Montagne joined the French Foreign Ministry in 1978. He served as first secretary at the French embassy in New Delhi (1981–83), counsellor in Bonn (1988–91), then as spokesman for the French Foreign Ministry (1991–93) and deputy private secretary to the minister of foreign affairs (1993–95).

He became private secretary and head of Prime Minister Alain Juppé's office (1995–97).

He then served as the ambassador to Japan (1998–2002) and became senior diplomatic advisor and G8 sherpa to the French President Jacques Chirac (2002–07).

Gourdault-Montagne was appointed as French ambassador to the United Kingdom in 2007 and became ambassador to Germany on 14 March 2011.

On 20 August 2014, he was appointed ambassador to China, from which post he retired in 2017.

His memoirs, entitled "Les autres ne pensent pas comme nous" were published in 2022 by the Bouquins firm.
