= List of ambassadors of France to Timor-Leste =

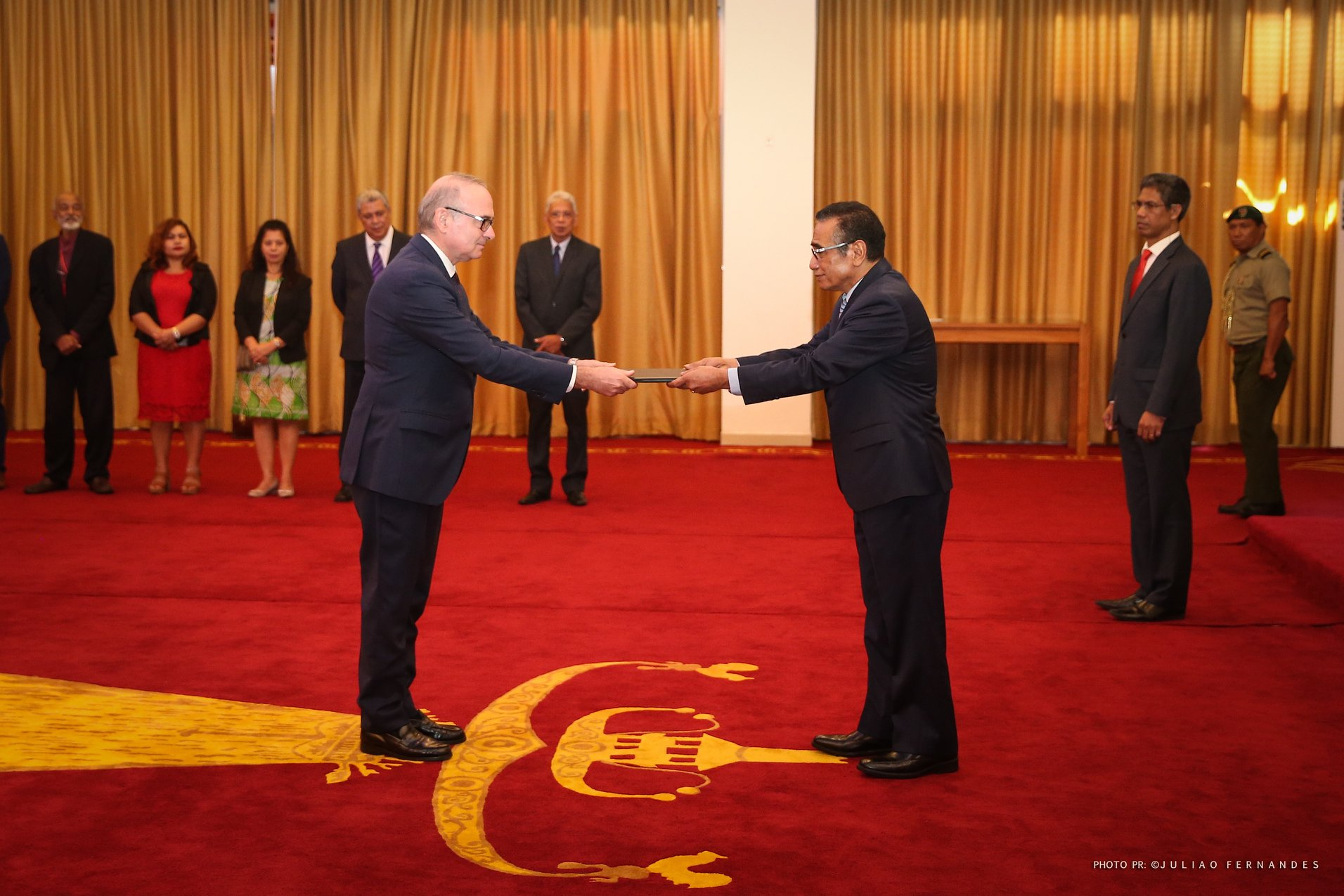
Presentation by Olivier Chambard of his credentials to President Francisco Guterres on February 20, 2020

The diplomatic representation of France to Timor-Leste is located at the Embassy of France in Jakarta, Indonesia, and its ambassador has been Fabien Penone since 2023.

== Diplomatic representation of France ==
Timor-Leste was a Portuguese colony from the 1702 until its independence on 28 November 1975. But on 7 December, Indonesia invaded the territory, making it its 27th province. Following secession in 1999, which led to the United Nations being placed under administration, the country became independent on 20 May 2002. In December 2002, the French Ambassador to Indonesia was accredited to Timor-Leste.

== French ambassadors to Timor-Leste ==
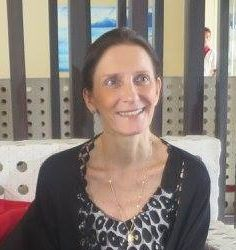
Corinne Breuzé in 2016

From	To	Ambassador	Residence
2002	2003	Hervé Ladsous	Jakarta
2003	2006	Renaud Vignal	Jakarta
2006	2008	Catherine Boivineau	Jakarta
2008	2011	Philippe Zeller	Jakarta
2013	2017	Corinne Breuzé	Jakarta
2017	2019	Jean-Charles Berthonnet	Jakarta
2020	2023	Olivier Chambard	Jakarta
2023		Fabien Penone	Jakarta
