= Jean-Pierre Lacroix (diplomat) =

French diplomat (born 1960)

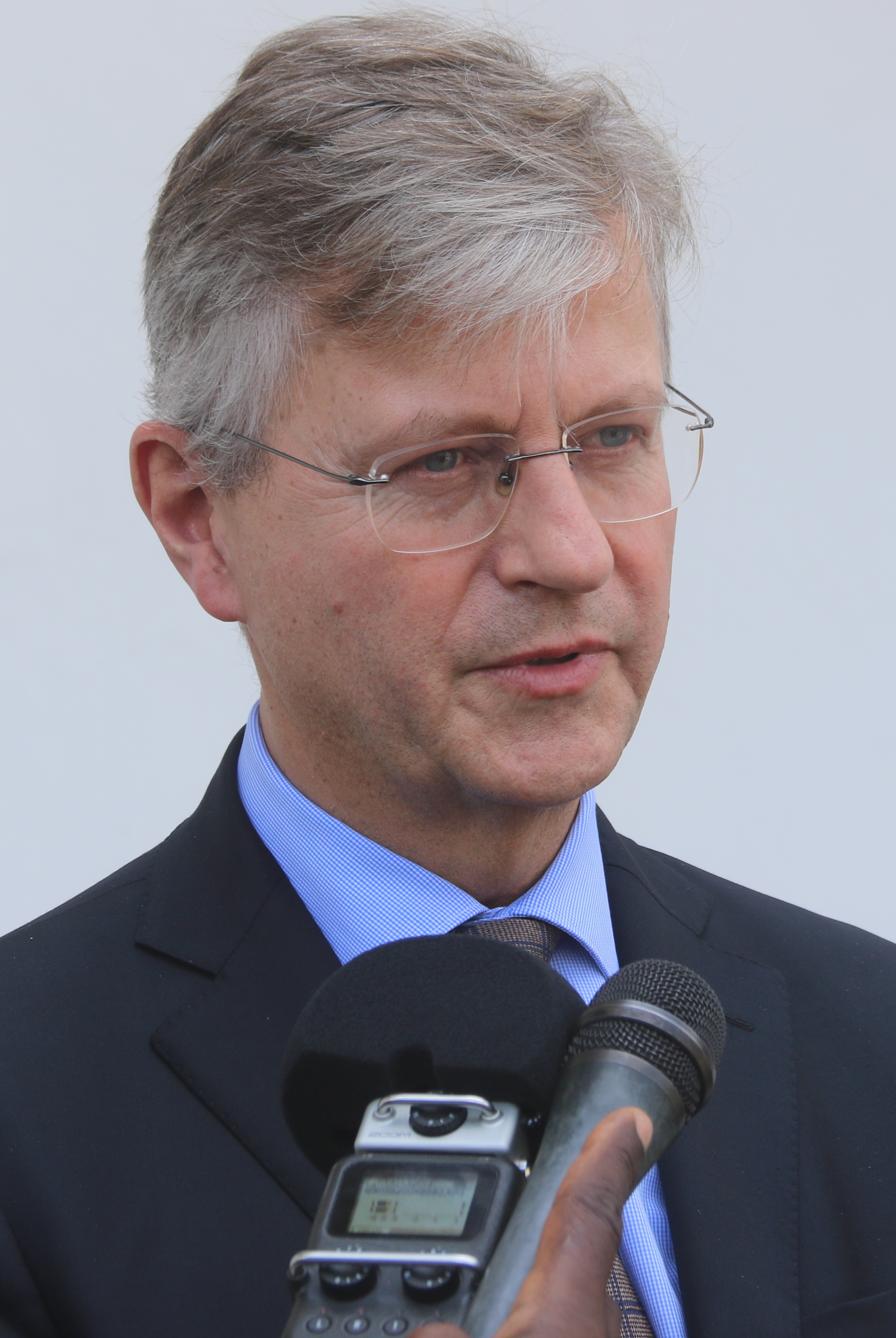
- Lacroix in 2018

Under-Secretary-General for Peace Operations
- Incumbent
- Assumed office 1 April 2017
- Appointed by: António Guterres
- Preceded by: Hervé Ladsous

Personal details
- Born: Jean-Pierre François Renaud Lacroix; 2 May 1960 (age 66)
- Education: ESSEC Business School; Sciences Po; École nationale d'administration

Jean-Pierre François Renaud Lacroix (French pronunciation: [ʒɑ̃pjɛʁ lakʁwa]; born 2 May 1960) is a French diplomat who has served as the United Nations Under-Secretary-General for Peace Operations since 1 April 2017. Prior to this, he worked at the French Ministry of Foreign Affairs as Director for the United Nations between 2014 and 2017, and before that as France's ambassador to Sweden beginning in 2011.

Lacroix replaced Hervé Ladsous of France, extending a 20-year lock on the job.

== Early life and education ==
Lacroix was born 2 May 1960.

Lacroix is a graduate of the ESSEC Business School, Sciences Po, and a 1988 "Michel de Montaigne" graduate of the National School of Administration (ENA). He holds a master's in political science and has a law degree.

== Career ==
Lacroix held positions at the Embassy of France in Prague, the Embassy of France in Washington and in the Cabinet of Prime Minister Édouard Balladur (1993–1995). From 2002 to 2006, he was the deputy director of the United Nations and International Organizations Division of the France's Ministry of Foreign Affairs. From 2006 to 2009, he was the Deputy Permanent Representative of France to the United Nations in New York. On 15 July 2011, he was appointed France's Ambassador to Sweden. Between 7 July 2014 and 2017, he worked at the Ministry of Foreign Affairs in France, as the Director for United Nations, International Organisations, Human Rights and Francophonie.

On 14 February 2017, it was announced that he was appointed by United Nations (UN) Secretary-General Antonio Guterres as the Under-Secretary-General for Peace Operations. He took office on 1 April that year. At the time of his succession, there were around 120,000 UN Blue Helmet Peacekeepers and 16 missions around the world, mostly in Africa. In particular, he took office during conflicts in Mali, South Sudan, and the Democratic Republic of the Congo.

== Other activities ==
- International Gender Champions (IGC), Member
