= List of ambassadors of France to Italy =

The chronology of French ambassadors to Italy begins in 1872 with Hugues Fournier and extends to the present. Camille Barrère has the longest tenure recorded, serving from 1897 to 1924.

== List ==
| From | To | Ambassador |
|---|---|---|
| 1872 | 1873 | Hugues Fournier |
| 1875 | 1882 | Emmanuel Henri Victurnien de Noailles |
| 1882 | 1886 | Albert Decrais |
| 1886 | 1888 | Charles de Mouy |
| 1888 | 1890 | Jean-Baptiste Mariani |
| 1890 | 1897 | Albert Billot |
| 1897 | 1924 | Camille Barrère |
| 1924 | 1927 | René Besnard |
| 1927 | 1932 | Maurice Delarüe Caron de Beaumarchais |
| 1933 | 1933 | Henry de Jouvenel |
| 1933 | 1936 | Count Charles de Chambrun |
| 1936 | 1938 | Jules Francois Blondel |
| 1938 | 1940 | André François-Poncet |
| 1944 | 1946 | Maurice Couve de Murville |
| 1946 | 1946 | Alexandre Parodi |
| 1946 | 1947 | Georges Balay |
| 1947 | 1957 | Jacques Fouques-Duparc |
| 1957 | 1962 | Gaston Palewski |
| 1962 | 1967 | Armand Berard |
| 1967 | 1972 | Etienne Burin des Roziers |
| 1972 | 1975 | Charles Lucet |
| 1975 | 1981 | Francois Puaux |
| 1981 | 1982 | Jacques Senard |
| 1982 | 1984 | Gilles Martinet |
| 1984 | 1988 | Jacques Andreani |
| 1988 | 1991 | Gilbert Perol |
| 1991 | 1993 | Philippe Cuvillier |
| 1993 | 1995 | Jean Louis Lucet |
| 1995 | 1998 | Jean-Bernard Mérimée |
| 1998 | 2002 | Jacques Blot |
| 2002 | 2005 | Loïc Hennekinne |
| 2005 | 2007 | Yves Aubin de La Messuziere |
| 2007 | 2011 | Jean-Marc de La Sablière |
| 2011 | 2014 | Alain Le Roy |
| 2014 | 2017 | Catherine Colonna |
| 2017 | 2023 | Christian Masset |
| 2023 | 2026 | Martin Briens |
| 2026 | | Anne-Marie Descôtes |

== See also ==
- France–Italy relations
- List of ambassadors of Italy to France
