= Nicolas de Rivière =

French diplomat (born 1963)

His Excellency Ambassador Nicolas de Rivière
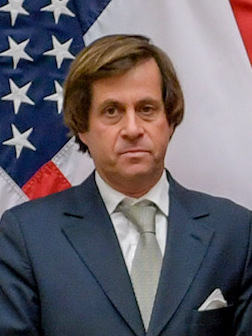
- De Rivière in 2018

French Ambassador to Russia
- Incumbent
- Assumed office 1 February 2025
- President: Emmanuel Macron
- Preceded by: Pierre Lévy

President of the United Nations Security Council
- In office 1 January 2024 – 30 January 2024
- Preceded by: José de la Gasca
- Succeeded by: Carolyn Rodrigues
- In office 1 September 2022 – 30 September 2022 Serving with Catherine Colonna
- Preceded by: Zhang Jun
- Succeeded by: Michel Xavier Biang; Michael Moussa-Adamo
- In office 1 June 2020 – 30 June 2020 Serving with Jean-Yves Le Drian
- Preceded by: Sven Jürgenson
- Succeeded by: T. S. Tirumurti; S. Jaishankar
- In office 1 July 2021 – 31 July 2021
- Preceded by: Sven Jürgenson
- Succeeded by: Christoph Heusgen

Permanent Representative of France to the United Nations
- In office 8 July 2019 – 30 January 2025
- President: Emmanuel Macron
- Preceded by: François Delattre
- Succeeded by: Jérôme Bonnafont

Personal details
- Born: 26 September 1963 (age 62) Paris, France
- Education: Sciences Po; University of Paris
- Profession: Diplomat

Nicolas de Rivière (French pronunciation: [nikɔla də ʁivjɛʁ]; born 26 September, 1963) is a French diplomat who has been serving as the ambassador of France to Russia since 1 February 2025. He previously served as the permanent Representative of France to the United Nations from 8 July 2019 to 30 January 2025, where he was President of the United Nations Security Council four times.

== Early life ==
Rivière was born in Paris, France, in 1963.

In 1985, Rivière obtained a law degree (Licence en droit) at the University of Paris. He attended Sciences Po Paris in 1987. In 1992, he finished his studies in the École nationale d'administration with the "promotion Condorcet".

== Career ==
Rivière served as officer in the French Minister of Foreign Affairs between 1992 and 1994. He was a press counselor to his country embassy in The Hague, Netherlands until 1997, after which he moved to Washington, D.C. until 2001. He was vice president of external and governmental affairs of EADS-Astrium from 2001 to 2002.

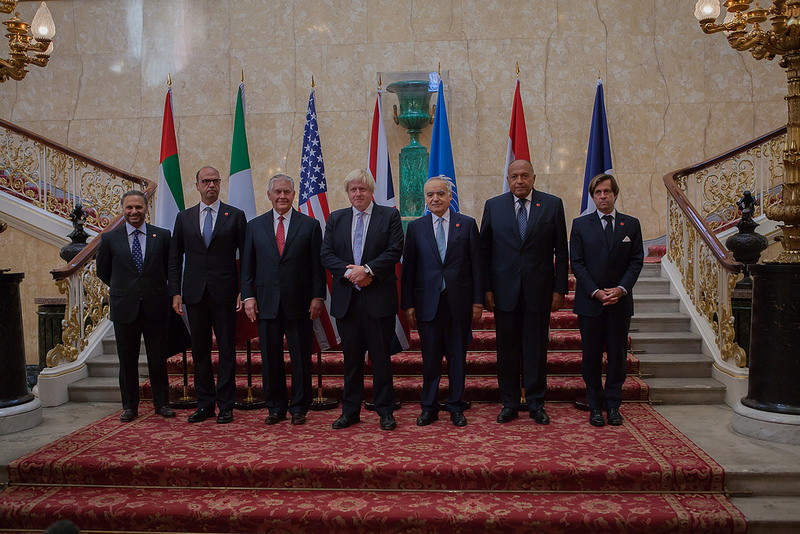
Nicolas de Rivière (right), with Foreign Ministers & Representatives

Rivière then served in the offices of two Foreign Ministers: first, as Counselor for Economic Affairs, Asia and North America in the office of Dominique de Villepin (2002-2004), then as Counselor for International Economic issues, Asia and Americas in the office of Michel Barnier (2004-2005).

Rivière was Deputy Permanent Representative of France to the United Nations in New York (2009-2010) then Assistant Secretary for United Nations, International Organizations, Human Rights and Francophonie from 2011 to 2014. He was Director General of Political and Security Affairs at the Ministry for Europe and Foreign Affairs from 2014 to 2019.

In July 2019 Rivière was appointed by President Emmanuel Macron as the new permanent representative of France to the United Nations, starting July 8, 2019.

== Other activities ==
- International Peace Institute (IPI), Member of the International Advisory Council
- United Nations International School (UNIS), Honorary Trustee (since 2019)
