= Joseph Noulens =

French politician and diplomat

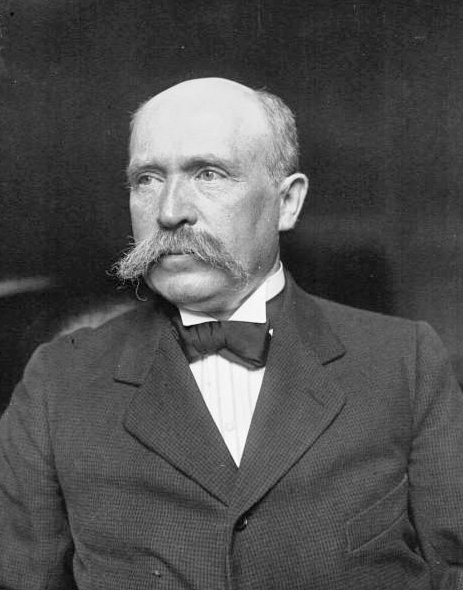
Joseph Noulens in 1919

Joseph Noulens (29 March 1864 – 9 September 1944) was a French politician and diplomat.

Noulens became a member of the Chamber of Deputies in 1903 and served as Minister of War from 1913 to 1914 and then as Minister of Finance from 1914 to 1915. In 1920 he became a Senator.

== Involvement in Russia ==
In June 1917 he was appointed French ambassador to Russia. Following the October Revolution, he worked with White Guards to undermine the Bolshevik regime. In 1918 he proposed a two-tier operation to stabilise the economy of regime set up by General Yevgeny Miller in North Russia. The scheme involved a loan of 15 million rubles, set against a lien of 20 million rubles worth of sawn wood. The second phase involved issuing 200 million rubles in back notes backed by the allies at a rate of 10 - 1 to the dollar. (i.e. 20 million dollars). However, as the security against this was to be $25million worth of concessions from the Russian forestry industry, concern about the instability of the regime led to an alternative plan involving the creation of a currency board being adopted. this had been devised by John Maynard Keynes.

He was depicted with two other French members of a delegation in a poster issued by the Russian Telegraph Agency (Glavpolitprosvet). They were shown laughing and planning to bring the return of the monarchy. After the failure of Bruce Lockhart—Sidney Reilly conspiracy to assassinate Vladimir Lenin, Noulens left Russia.

In 1919 he became President of an international association of creditors of Russia, which agitated against diplomatic recognition of the Bolshevik regime but they did not accept responsibility for the old debts made by the Russian Empire He later became leader of the Society of French Interests in Russia. At a meeting in Paris in February 1922 they demanded a veto on negotiations with the Soviet Union unless the latter acknowledged the old debts. This view was promoted at the Genoa Conference held from 10 April to 19 May 1922.

== Books ==
- My Mission in Soviet Russia (1933)

Political offices
| Preceded by Eugène Étienne | Minister of War; 1913–14 | Succeeded by Théophile Delcassé |
| Preceded by Étienne Clémentel | Minister of Finance; 13 June – 26 August 1914 | Succeeded by Alexandre Ribot |
