= Alexander Peter Mackenzie Douglas =

French Jacobite (1713–1765)

Sir Alexander Peter Mackenzie Douglas, Baron of Kildin or Alexandre-Pierre de Mackensie-Douglas (fr.) or Alexandre Pierre Mackenzie, baron de Kildin, chevalier Douglass (1713-1765) was a Jacobite in French service.

Mackenzie Douglas was born to Colin MacKenzie of Kildin, a Captain at the lost Battle of Sheriffmuir (1715). As sympathizers with the Stuarts' cause, Mackenzie Douglas and his brother Charles-Joseph Douglas (1720-1788) were taken prisoner after the Battle of Culloden (1746). Released shortly after, Mackenzie Douglas followed Prince Charles Edward Stuart ("Bonnie Prince Charlie") to his exile in France.

According to the memoirs of the Chevalier d'Eon, King Louis XV of France sent d'Eon and Mackenzie-Douglas on a secret mission to Russia in order to meet Empress Elizabeth (reigned 1741-1762) and to conspire with the pro-French faction in Russia against the Habsburg monarchy

He served as the official French chargé d'affaires in St Petersburg from 1755 to 1756 following the re-establishment of Franco-Russian diplomatic relations, which had been broken off in 1748. During his mission he successfully pushed ahead Russia's Act of Accession to the First Treaty of Versailles, signed in St Petersburg, 31 December 1756. In doing that, he outmanoeuvred the efforts of his British counterpart Charles Hanbury Williams who had negotiated with Russia's leading politician Count Bestuzhev-Ryumin a British-Russian alliance (Treaty of Saint Petersburg (1755)) on 30 September 1755, which was never ratified due to Mackenzie-Douglas' attempts.

Mackenzie-Douglas's tombstone was re-discovered in France in 2015.
