= Jean-Marc de La Sablière =

French diplomat

Permanent Representative of France to the United Nations
- In office 2002–2007
- President: Jacques Chirac
- Secretary General: Kofi Annan; Ban Ki-moon
- Preceded by: Jean-David Levitte
- Succeeded by: Jean-Maurice Ripert

Ambassador of France to Italy
- In office 2007–2011
- President: Nicolas Sarkozy
- Preceded by: Yves de La Messuzière
- Succeeded by: Alain Le Roy

Personal details
- Born: 8 November 1946 (age 79) Athens, Greece
- Education: Sciences Po, ÉNA
- Occupation: Diplomat

Jean-Marc de La Sablière (born 8 November 1946, in Athens) was the Ambassador of France in Italy between 2007 and 2011. Previously he was the Permanent Representative of France to the United Nations from 2002 to 2007.

He arrived at the UN in 2002. For the previous two years he had been diplomatic adviser to President Chirac. He is an alumnus of the École Nationale d'Administration (ÉNA). La Sablière also graduated from the Paris Institute of Political Studies (Sciences Po).

== Honors ==
- Officer of the Légion d'honneur
- Chevalier of the Ordre national du Mérite

Diplomatic posts
Preceded by Jean-David Levitte	Permanent Representative of France to the United Nations; 2002–2007	Succeeded by Jean-Maurice Ripert
Preceded by Yves de La Messuzière	Ambassador of France to Italy; 2007–2011	Succeeded by Alain Le Roy
