= Sylvie Bermann =

French diplomat (born 1953)

Her Excellency Sylvie Bermann
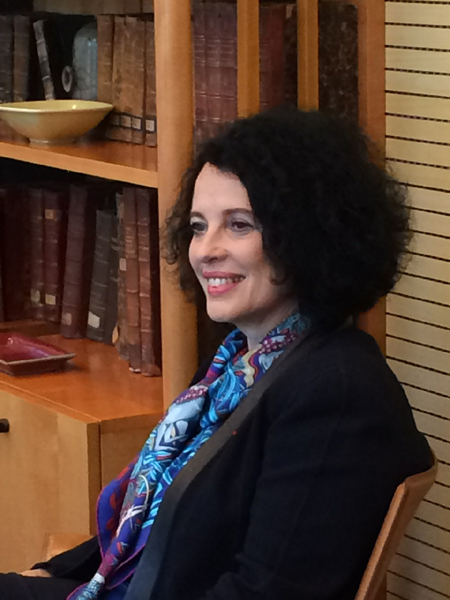

Ambassador of France to the United Kingdom
- In office 21 August 2014 – 11 September 2017
- Monarch: Elizabeth II
- President: François Hollande; Emmanuel Macron
- Preceded by: Bernard Émié
- Succeeded by: Jean-Pierre Jouyet

Ambassador of France to Russia
- In office September 2017 – December 2019
- President: Emmanuel Macron
- Preceded by: Jean-Maurice Ripert
- Succeeded by: Pierre Levy

Personal details
- Born: 19 October 1953 (age 72) Salins-les-Bains, France
- Education: Paris-Sorbonne University; Sciences Po
- Profession: Diplomat
- Website: www.ambafrance-uk.org

Sylvie-Agnès Bermann (born 19 October 1953) is a French former career diplomat who served as the ambassador of France to the United Kingdom, ambassador of France to Russia, and as French ambassador to China in Beijing from 2011 until 2014. She previously served as director for United Nations, International Organizations, Human Rights and Francophony at the French Ministry of Foreign Affairs and International Development in Paris.

== Early life and education ==
Bermann is a graduate of Paris-Sorbonne University where she studied history, the Paris Institute of Political Studies ("Sciences Po"), the French Institut national des langues et civilisations orientales where she studied Chinese, and the Beijing Language and Culture University

== Career ==
Bermann embarked on her diplomatic career in 1979. She served as vice-consul at the French Consulate General in Hong Kong from 1979 to 1980, and subsequently became third secretary, then second secretary, at the French embassy in China between 1980 and 1982.

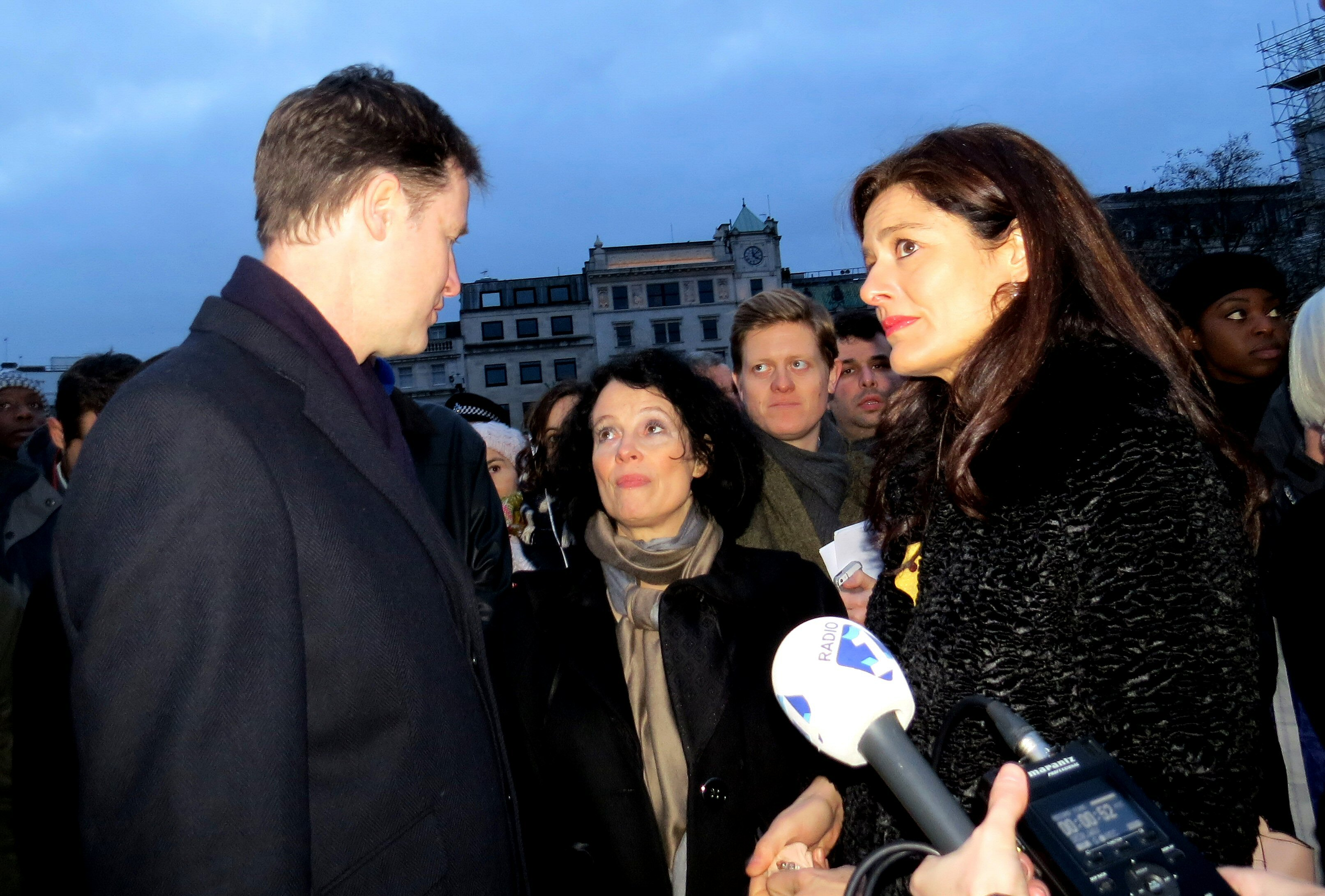
Ambassador Bermann with Miriam and Nick Clegg in Trafalgar Square at the "Je Suis Charlie" rally, 2015

Bermann was subsequently responsible for policy relating to China/Hong Kong/Taiwan at the French Ministry of Foreign Affairs and International Development until 1986, when she became second counsellor at the French embassy in Moscow. In 1989, Bermann returned to Paris to take up the post of head of the Southeast Asia Department, where she remained until 1992.

In 1992 Bermann was appointed second counsellor at the Permanent Mission of France to the United Nations in New York. In 1996, she became head of the Common Foreign and Security Policy Department at the French Foreign Ministry, before becoming ambassador as permanent representative of France to the Western European Union and to the European Union's Political and Security Committee (PSC) in Brussels in 2002.

Bermann headed the French Foreign Ministry's directorate for the UN and international organizations, human rights and Francophony, from December 2005 to February 2011.

Bermann was appointed ambassador extraordinary and plenipotentiary to China on 23 February 2011, becoming the first woman to hold the post of French ambassador in a country which is a permanent member of the Security Council. She became French ambassador to the United Kingdom in August 2014.

== Other activities ==
- French Institute for International and Strategic Affairs (IRIS), Member of the Board of Directors
- Institute of Advanced Studies in National Defence (IHEDN), Member of the Board of Directors (since 2020)

== Writing ==
In 2021, Bermann published a book about Britain and Brexit - Goodbye Britannia based on stereotypes of French hatred toward Britain (Éditions Stock). She had previously written a book on China - La Chine en eaux profondes (Éditions Stock, 2017).

== Honours ==
- Officier, Légion d'honneur (2012)
- Commander (2019) of the Ordre national du Mérite, Officier in 2008.

== See also ==
- List of Ambassadors of France to the United Kingdom
- Ministère des Affaires étrangères de la France
