= Alain Le Roy =

French diplomat

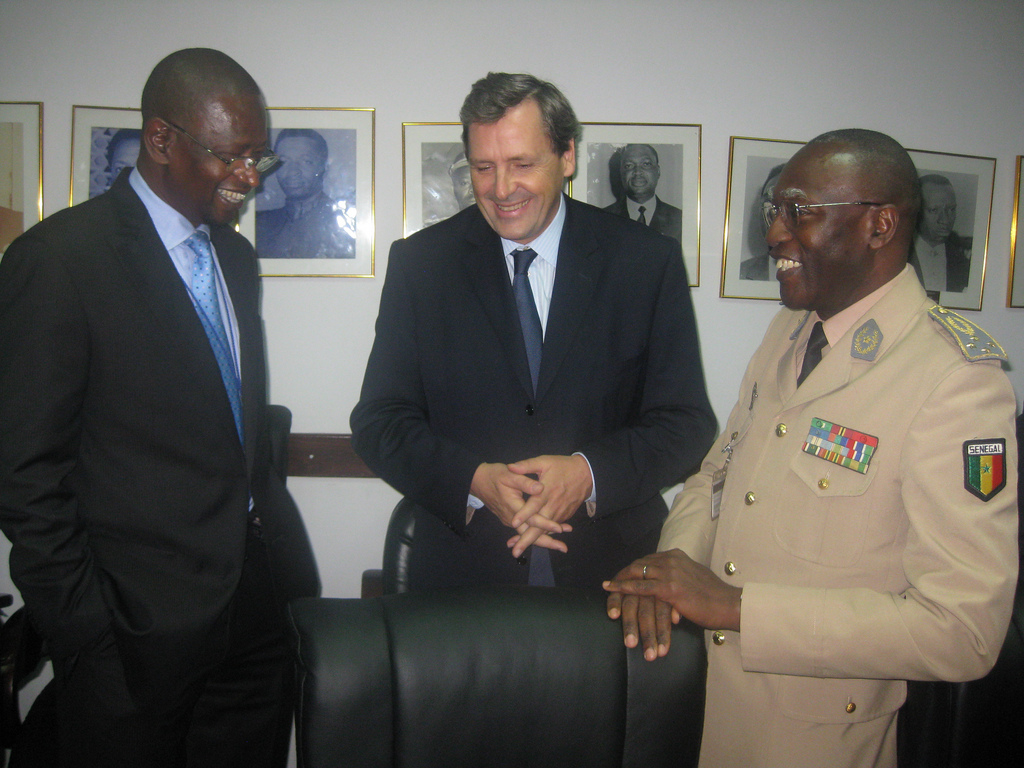
- Alain Le Roy, diplomat in the middle and General Gaye on the right

Executive Secretary General - European External Action Service (EEAS)
- In office 1 March 2015 – 31 August 2016
- President: François Hollande
- Preceded by: Pierre Vimont
- Succeeded by: Helga Schmid

Ambassador of France to Italy
- In office 2011–2014
- President: Nicolas Sarkozy; François Hollande
- Preceded by: Jean-Marc de La Sablière
- Succeeded by: Catherine Colonna

Under-Secretary-General for Peacekeeping Operations
- In office 30 June 2008 – 25 August 2011
- Appointed by: Ban Ki-moon
- Preceded by: Jean-Marie Guéhenno
- Succeeded by: Hervé Ladsous

Personal details
- Born: 5 February 1953 (age 73) Moscow, Russia, Soviet Union
- Education: École des Mines de Paris; University of Paris

Alain Le Roy (French pronunciation: [alɛ̃ lə ʁwa]; born 5 February 1953) is a French diplomat who served as Secretary General of the European External Action Service (EEAS) between 1 March 2015 and 31 August 2016. In this capacity, he was in charge of around 3,400 staff and around 140 delegations in non-EU countries. On 16 June 2016 he announced he would be resigning effective 1 September 2016, being replaced by Helga Schmid, who has been political director of the EEAS and as such, been involved in the Iran nuclear negotiations.

Until August 2011, Le Roy served as Under-Secretary-General for Peacekeeping Operations at the United Nations. He was appointed to the position in June 2008 by United Nations Secretary-General Ban Ki-moon. From December 2011 until August 2014 he served as Ambassador of France to Italy. As of 1 September 2014 he rejoined the Cour des comptes as Conseiller maître.

== Early life and education ==
Le Roy holds a degree in engineering from the Ecole des Mines; a Diplôme d’Études Approfondies (Master of Advanced Studies) in economics from Pantheon-Sorbonne University, and an Agrégation d'économie et gestion. He also has completed a program for senior managers in government from Harvard Kennedy School at Harvard University.

== Career ==
=== Early career ===
Le Roy worked at French oil and gas company Total for ten years and entered public service in 1990 as deputy prefect of the Eure-et-Loir region.

=== French diplomatic service ===
Before joining the United Nations, Le Roy was Conseiller maître à la Cour des comptes. From September 2007 to 2008, he was Ambassador in charge of the Union for the Mediterranean, a project devised by Nicolas Sarkozy, France's president at the time, to deepen relations between the EU and the countries of the region. In December 2007, he masterminded a declaration issued in Rome by the governments of France, Italy and Spain to reassure Turkey that the union would not affect its membership negotiations with the EU.

Between 2005 and 2007, he served as ambassador to Madagascar. Previously, he held several positions in the French Ministry of Foreign Affairs, including Assistant Secretary for Economic and Financial Affairs and National Coordinator for the Stability Pact for South Eastern Europe. In his capacity as director for economic affairs between 2002 and 205, he was deputy sherpa for Jacques Chirac for the 29th G8 summit in Évian-les-Bains in 2003.

In 2001 and 2002, Le Roy also acted as the European Union Special Representative in the former Yugoslav Republic of Macedonia, succeeding François Léotard.

=== Career with the United Nations ===
Earlier in his career, Le Roy was involved in the works of the United Nations in different capacities. In 1995, he served as Deputy to the United Nations Special Coordinator for Sarajevo and Director of Operations for the restoration of essential public services. He also went on missions for the United Nations Development Programme in Mauritania. Between 1999 and 2000, he was appointed United Nations Regional Administrator in Kosovo (West Region).

== Political positions ==
During the 2008 Nord-Kivu campaign in DR Congo, Le Roy pushed for more troops in the region, stating that "With so much at stake, the international community simply cannot afford to let the Congo slide into the abyss, the time to act is, and indeed must be, now."

Diplomatic posts
Preceded by Jean-Marc de La Sablière	Ambassador of France to Italy; 2011–2014	Succeeded by Catherine Colonna
