= Bernard Émié =

French diplomat (born 1958)

Bernard Émié KCVO
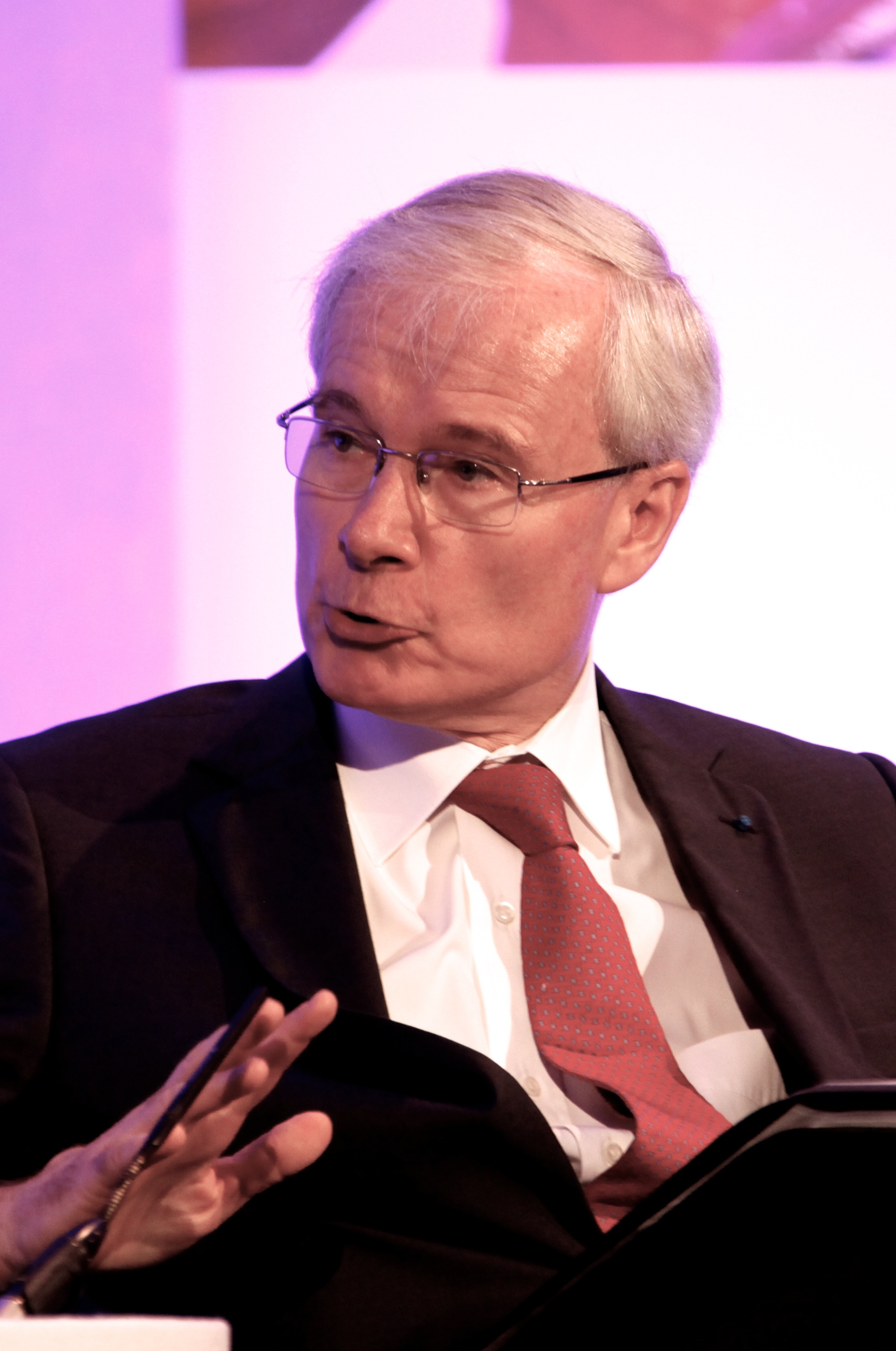
- Émié in 2012

Director General of External Security
- In office 26 June 2017 – 8 January 2024
- President: Emmanuel Macron
- Preceded by: Bernard Bajolet
- Succeeded by: Nicolas Lerner

French Ambassador to Algeria
- In office 1 August 2014 – 26 June 2017
- President: François Hollande; Emmanuel Macron
- Preceded by: André Parant
- Succeeded by: Xavier Driencourt

French Ambassador to the United Kingdom
- In office 2 April 2011 – 31 July 2014
- President: Nicolas Sarkozy; François Hollande
- Preceded by: Maurice Gourdault-Montagne
- Succeeded by: Sylvie Bermann

Personal details
- Born: Bernard Jean Maurice Émié; 6 September 1958 (age 68) Paris, France
- Spouse: Isabelle née de Chabannes La Palice de Tournon
- Education: Sciences Po; École nationale d'administration
- Profession: Diplomat

Bernard Jean Maurice Émié KCVO (French pronunciation: [bɛʁnaʁ emje]; born 6 September 1958) is a French retired diplomat and senior civil servant. He served as Director General of External Security (DGSE), at the head of France's main external intelligence agency, from 2017 until 2024. He previously was the French ambassador in five countries from 1998 to 2017: Algeria, the United Kingdom, Turkey, Lebanon and Jordan.

== Career ==
Emié graduated with a diploma in 1979 from Sciences Po, before going up to the École nationale d'administration (ÉNA). He joined the French Foreign Ministry as a secretary in 1983. He served as second secretary in New Delhi, India (1984–86), before being seconded by Jean-Bernard Raimond to the Foreign Ministry.

Emié was promoted as counsellor at the French embassy in Washington, DC, United States, before returning to duties at the French foreign ministry as deputy director for North Africa and the Middle East. Emié served as private secretary (1993–95) to Alain Juppé, and as minister-counsellor to President Jacques Chirac. During the Rwanda genocide he gave the order to allow Rwanda genocide perpetrators to flee.

In 1998, he was appointed ambassador to the Jordan and, in 2002, was given the responsibility of being France's director of North African and Middle Eastern affairs. In 2004, he was appointed the French ambassador to the Lebanon. Émié served as ambassador to Turkey from 2007 until 2011 and as French ambassador to London from 2011 until 2014, before being posted as French ambassador to Algeria.

He was the head of the Directorate General for External Security (DGSE), the French foreign intelligence agency, from June 2017 until his retirement in January 2024. According to the French outlet Intelligence Online, on 24 March 2023, Émié secretly visited Minsk to act as a mediator with Belarusian president Alexander Lukashenko amid the Russian invasion of Ukraine.

== Personal life ==
Bernard Emié, of Belgian descent, married on 30 September 1989 Isabelle, only daughter of François de Chabannes (marquis de La Palice de Tournon), by whom he has two daughters (Constance and Pauline) and one son (Louis).

== Honours and decorations ==
- Commandeur (2023), Ordre de la Légion d'honneur
- Officier (2009), Ordre national du Mérite
  - Médaille d’honneur pour acte de courage et de dévouement
  - Chevalier du Tastevin
- Honorary Knight Commander of the Royal Victorian Order (2014)
