= Pierre Vimont =

French diplomat

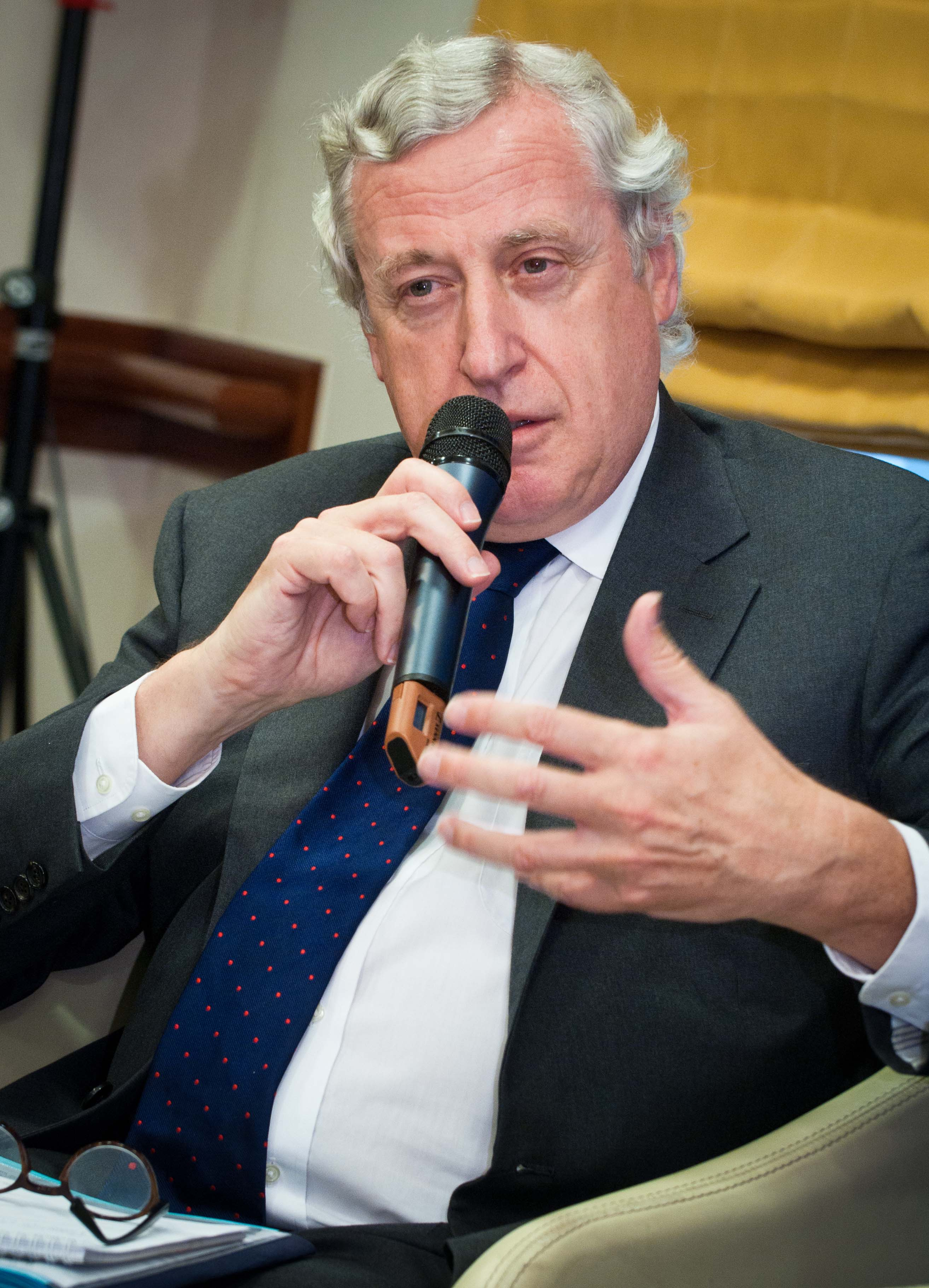

Ambassador of France to the United States
- In office 2007–2010
- President: Nicolas Sarkozy
- Preceded by: Jean-David Levitte
- Succeeded by: François Delattre

Executive Secretary General of the European External Action Service
- In office 25 October 2010 – 28 February 2015
- Succeeded by: Alain Le Roy

Personal details
- Born: 15 June 1949 (age 77) France
- Education: Sciences-Po Paris, ÉNA
- Profession: Diplomat

Pierre Vimont (born 15 June 1949) is a French diplomat who served as the Executive Secretary-General of the European External Action Service (EEAS) from 2010 until 2015. His current rank in the French civil service is "Ambassadeur de France", which is properly not a rank but a "dignity" bestowed upon a diplomat for life (unlike the other career ranks which cease to produce effect upon retirement or otherwise leaving the foreign service). He is a senior fellow at Carnegie Europe.

== Early life and education ==
Vimont holds a licence in law. He is a graduate of the Institut d'Études Politiques de Paris (Sciences Po) and the École nationale d'administration (1977). He speaks French, English and Spanish.

== Diplomatic career ==
Vimont's first post was at the French embassy in London, where he served as second secretary from 1977 to 1978 and first secretary from 1978 to 1981. He then served at the Press and Information department in Paris from 1981 to 1985. From 1985 to 1986 he worked at the EastWest Institute in New York City. Then he moved back to Europe to become the second councillor at the Permanent Representation of France at the European Community in Brussels, from 1986 to 1990.

Vimont subsequently became chief of staff to successive ministers delegate of European affairs Édith Cresson and Élisabeth Guigou from 1990 to 1993. He was the director for development and of scientific, technical, and educational cooperation (1993–1996) and subsequently the adjunct general director of cultural, scientific, and technical relations (1996–1997), and the director of European cooperation (1997–1999). From 1999 to 2002 he was the ambassador and permanent representative of France at the European Union in Brussels. From 2002 to 2007 he served as chief of staff to three French Foreign Ministers, Dominique de Villepin (2002–2004), Michel Barnier (2004–2005) and Philippe Douste-Blazy (2005–2007).

In 2007, President Nicolas Sarkozy appointed Vimont to the position of Ambassador to the United States. On 6 November 2007, he was among the guests invited to the state dinner hosted by U.S. President George W. Bush in honor of Sarkozy at the White House.

On 25 October 2010, Vimont was selected by the European Union's (EU) High Representative Catherine Ashton to be the first Executive Secretary General of the European External Action Service, which began operation on 1 December 2010.

== Later career ==
In March 2015 Vimont joined the European Leadership Network, a group of high-level former and serving officials from across Europe focused on dealing with the foreign and security challenges facing the continent. In May 2015, Vimont became a member of the Foundation Board of the Centre for Humanitarian Dialogue (HD), a private diplomacy organisation based in Switzerland. In June 2016, he became Chairman of HD's Foundation Board.

Additional roles include the following:

- Centre for European Reform (CER), Member of the Advisory Board
- European Council on Foreign Relations (ECFR), Member
- European Leadership Network (ELN), Senior Network Member

In June 2015, Vimont was appointed Personal Envoy of the President of the European Council, Donald Tusk, to lead preparations for the Valletta Summit on Migration between EU and African countries. In 2016, he served as France’s Middle East envoy for the Paris peace conference. In 2019, he was appointed as French President Emmanuel Macron’s Special Envoy for the architecture of security and trust with Russia.

== Recognition ==
Vimont is a knight of the National Order of Merit, and a commander of the National Order of the Légion d'Honneur.
