= Jean-Maurice Ripert =

French diplomat

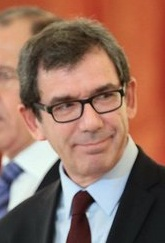
- Jean-Maurice Ripert

Ambassador of France to China
- In office 12 July 2017 – 2019
- President: Emmanuel Macron
- Preceded by: Maurice Gourdault-Montagne
- Succeeded by: Laurent Bili

Ambassador of France to Russia
- In office 2013–2017
- President: François Hollande
- Preceded by: Jean de Gliniasty
- Succeeded by: Sylvie Bermann

Permanent Representative of France to the United Nations
- In office 2007–2009
- President: Nicolas Sarkozy
- Secretary-General: Ban Ki-moon
- Preceded by: Jean-Marc de La Sablière
- Succeeded by: Gérard Araud

Personal details
- Born: 22 June 1953 (age 73) France
- Education: Sciences Po, ÉNA
- Profession: Diplomat

Jean-Maurice Ripert (born 22 June 1953) is a French diplomat. From 2013 to 2017 was the Ambassador of France to the Russian Federation. He is the current ambassador of France to China.

From 2009 to 2011, Ripert was the UN's Special Envoy for Assistance to Pakistan. Prior to this, from 2007 to 2009, Ripert was the Permanent Representative of France to the United Nations in New York. In that capacity, he was the President of the United Nations Security Council in September 2007 and in January 2009. Ripert was France's Permanent Representative to the United Nations in Geneva from 2005 to 2007.

Ripert was France's ambassador to Greece from 2000 to 2003.

In 2011, he was selected for the role of Ambassador of the European Union to Turkey, followed by his present position.
