= Stanislas de Laboulaye =

French diplomat

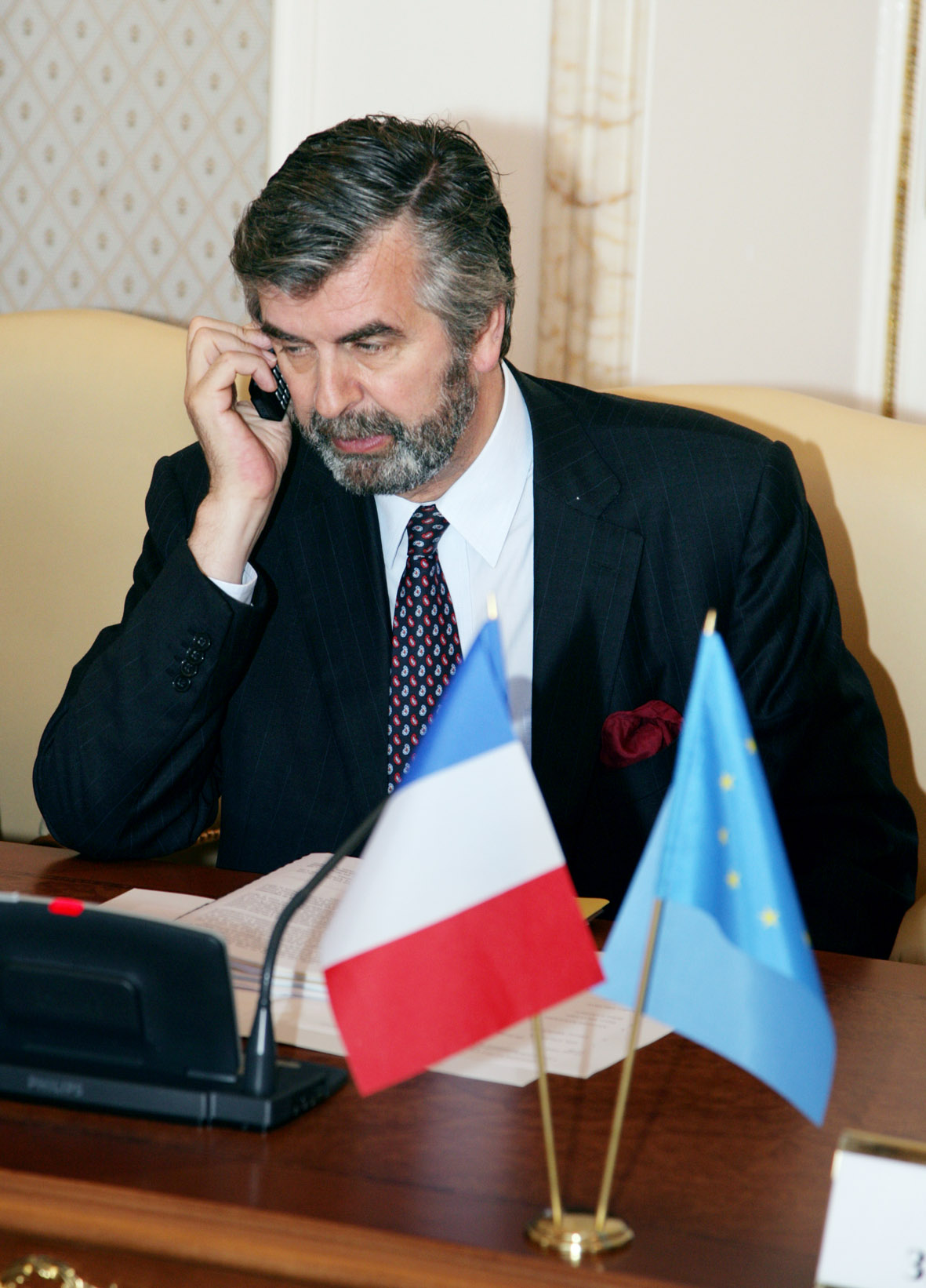
- Stanislas de Laboulaye in 2008

Ambassador of France to the Holy See
- In office 2009–2012
- President: Nicolas Sarkozy
- Preceded by: Bernard Kessedjian
- Succeeded by: Bruno Joubert

Personal details
- Born: 12 December 1946 (age 79) Beirut, Lebanon
- Education: University of Paris, ÉNA

Stanislas François Jean Lefebvre de Laboulaye (born 12 December 1946 in Beirut) is a French diplomat.

== Career ==
Over the course of his career, Laboulaye has served as the Consul General of France in Jerusalem (1996-1999), as Ambassador Extraordinary and Plenipotentiary of the Republic of France to the Holy See, and as Ambassador of France to Russia,.

== Other activities ==
- French Institute of International Relations (IFRI), Member of the Strategic Advisory Board
