= Anne-Marie Descôtes =

French diplomat (born 1959)

Secretary General of the Ministry for Europe and Foreign Affairs
- Incumbent
- Assumed office 30 August 2022
- Preceded by: François Delattre

Ambassador of France to Germany
- In office 6 June 2017 – 29 August 2022
- President: Emmanuel Macron
- Preceded by: Philippe Étienne
- Succeeded by: François Delattre

Personal details
- Born: 5 December 1959 (age 66) Lyon, France
- Education: École normale supérieure de Fontenay-aux-Roses; École nationale d'administration

Anne-Marie Descôtes (born 5 December 1959) is a French diplomat who has served as the Secretary General of the Ministry for Europe and Foreign Affairs since 2022. She previously served as Ambassador of France to Germany from 2017 to 2022. She succeeded Philippe Étienne and is the first woman to head the French embassy in reunified Germany.

== Early life and education ==
Descôtes was born on 5 December 1959 in Lyon to Georges Descôtes and Suzanne Jusseau.

After studying at the Lycée Jean-Perrin in Lyon, Descôtes joined the École normale supérieure de Fontenay-aux-Roses in 1979.

== Other activities ==
- European Council on Foreign Relations (ECFR), Member
- Institute of Advanced Studies in National Defence (IHEDN), Member of the Board of Directors

== Honours ==
- Order of the Rising Sun, 2nd Class, Gold and Silver Star (2026)
