= Adolphe Le Flô =

French Army general, politician, and diplomat

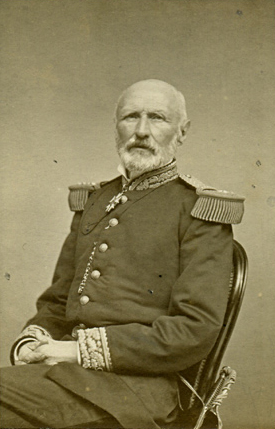
- Adolphe Le Flô

Minister of War
- In office 4 September 1870 – 5 June 1871
- Preceded by: Charles Cousin-Montauban, Comte de Palikao
- Succeeded by: Ernest Courtot de Cissey
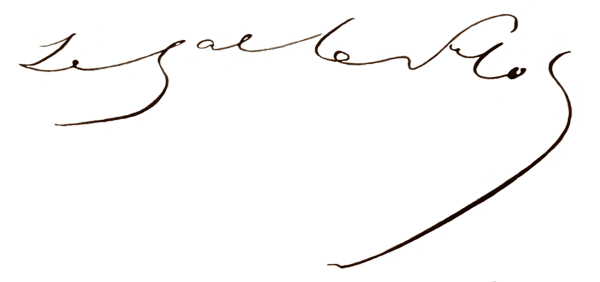
- Signature

Adolphe Charles Emmanuel Le Flô (2 November 1804 – 16 November 1887, Morlaix) was a French Army general, politician, and diplomat. An Orléanist, he served as the Third Republic's first Minister of War under Gambetta and Thiers.

== Life and career ==
Born in Lesneven, Finistère, Le Flô left Saint-Cyr in 1825. After serving in Constantine, Algeria, he became colonel on 20 October 1844, and brigadier general in 1848.

Le Flô was minister plenipotentiary to Russia, in 1848. In April 1848 he was elected deputy from Finistère to the Constituent Assembly, he was reelected in May 1849 to the Legislative Assembly he became quaestor. He fought the policy of the Napoleon III of France, which caused him to be banned after the coup of 2 December 1851. He took refuge in Jersey where he met Victor Hugo. He won the friendship of the Czar of Russia. He returned to France in 1857.

In 1870, after the proclamation of the Third Republic, Le Flô became Minister of War in the Government of National Defense and appointed Major General. He was minister of the war on 19 February 1871, in the Thiers government, but resigned in June 1871, after the siege of Paris and the Bloody Week of the Paris Commune.

Le Flô was elected deputy of Brittany from 1871 to 1876. He was appointed ambassador to St. Petersburg from 1871 to 1879 and used his relationship with them to neutralize the aggressive policy of Germany in 1875. He was promoted Grand Officer in the Legion of Honor.

Le Flô has a statue in Lesneven, by Cyprian Godebski.

Political offices
Preceded by Charles Cousin-Montauban, Comte de Palikao	Minister of War; 4 September 1870 – 5 June 1871	Succeeded by Ernest Courtot de Cissey
