= Hervé Ladsous =

French diplomat (born 1950)

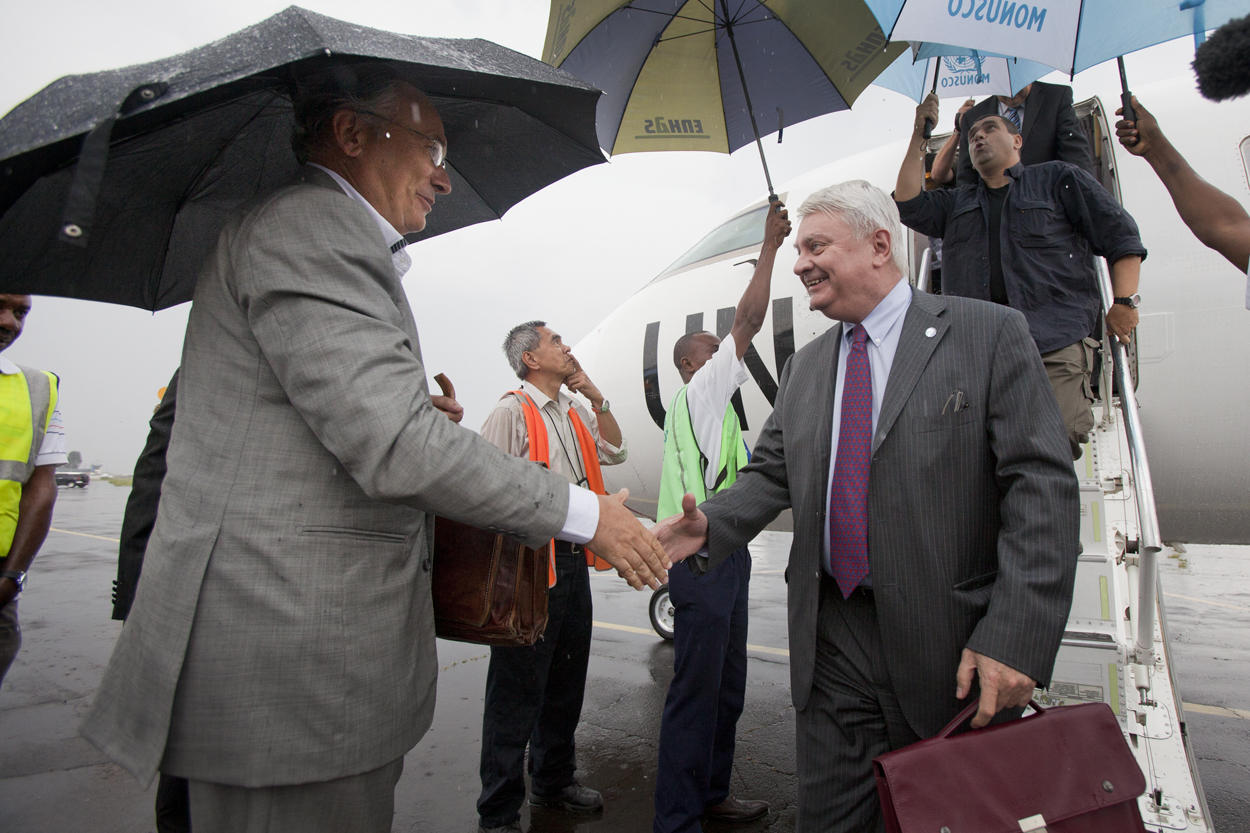

Under-Secretary-General for Peacekeeping Operations
- In office 2 September 2011 – 31 March 2017
- Appointed by: Ban Ki-moon
- Preceded by: Alain Le Roy
- Succeeded by: Jean-Pierre Lacroix

Personal details
- Born: 1950 (age 75–76)

Hervé Ladsous (born 1950) is the former United Nations Under-Secretary-General for Peacekeeping Operations. He was appointed to this position by the United Nations Secretary-General Ban Ki-moon on 2 September 2011, following Alain Le Roy.

Ladsous has a degree in law and a diploma in Chinese and Indonesian Malay from the National School of Oriental Studies in Paris.

In 1971 he joined the Foreign Ministry of France and was stationed in Hong Kong, Canberra, Beijing, and Geneva. He also acted as Deputy-Director General of the Department for the Americas and served in Haiti as ad interim Chargé d'affaires. Afterwards, he was appointed as Deputy Permanent Representative to the United Nations in New York City.

Ladsous's posts in France’s Foreign Service include Chief of Staff to the Minister for Foreign Affairs, ambassador to China, Indonesia and Timor-Leste, spokesperson for the Foreign Ministry and Director General for Asia and Oceania, as well as Permanent Representative to the Organization for Security and Co-operation in Europe (OSCE) in Vienna.

He is married and has three children.
