= Jean-David Levitte =

French diplomat

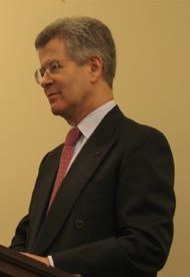
- Jean-David Levitte

Permanent Representative of France to the United Nations
- In office 2000–2002
- President: Jacques Chirac
- Secretary General: Kofi Annan
- Preceded by: Alain Dejammet
- Succeeded by: Jean-Marc de La Sablière

Ambassador of France to the United States
- In office 2002–2007
- President: Jacques Chirac
- Preceded by: François Bujon de l'Estang
- Succeeded by: Pierre Vimont

Personal details
- Born: 14 June 1946 (age 80) Moissac, France
- Education: Sciences Po
- Profession: Diplomat

Jean-David Levitte (born 14 June 1946) is a French diplomat who was France's Permanent Representative to the United Nations from 2000 to 2002 and Ambassador to the United States from 2002 to 2007. He was also a diplomatic advisor and sherpa to presidents Jacques Chirac and Nicolas Sarkozy.

Levitte was born in Moissac, in the south of France. He is a graduate of Sciences Po and of the French National School of Oriental Languages, where he studied Chinese and Indonesian. He is married to Marie-Cécile Jonas and has two daughters.

== Diplomatic career ==
Levitte's first posts were in Hong Kong in 1970 and in Beijing, China from 1972 to 1974. In the French Ministry of Foreign Affairs itself, he has served as Director of Economic Affairs (1974–1975), Assistant Director of West Africa (1984–1986), Assistant Director of the Cabinet (1986–1988), Director of Asia and Oceania (1990–1993), and General Director of Cultural, Scientific, and Technical Relations (1993–1995).

Between 1981 and 1984 Levitte was the Adviser to the Permanent Mission of France at the United Nations in New York. In 1988, he was designated to his first position as Ambassador and served as the French Permanent Representative to the United Nations Office at Geneva from 1988 to 1990.

Between 1975 and 1981, he was the chargé de mission at the General Secretariat of President Valéry Giscard d'Estaing. Between 1995 and 2000 he was a diplomatic advisor and sherpa to President Jacques Chirac, a position to which he returned in 2007, under President Nicolas Sarkozy.

From 2000 to 2002, Levitte was Ambassador to the United Nations in New York, representing France at the Security Council before and during the negotiation that lead to the United Nations Security Council Resolution 1441 on Iraq. He was President of the Security Council in September 2001 and presiding over the Council's deliberations following the September 11, 2001 attacks on the United States.

From late 2002 to 2007, Levitte was Ambassador to the United States. He presented his ambassadorial credentials to President George W. Bush in Washington on December 9, 2002. He was succeeded by Pierre Vimont, who was appointed on August 1, 2007.

=== Back to the Élysée ===
On May 16, 2007, Levitte was appointed as diplomatic advisor and sherpa to President Nicolas Sarkozy, and the head of a future American-style National Security Council. The nature and extent of his new role were not immediately clear. While some commentators suggested he would not eclipse Minister of Foreign and European Affairs Bernard Kouchner, Levitte was elsewhere referred to as "seemingly the true Minister of Foreign Affairs." Despite assertions made while campaigning, it was still unclear to what extent President Sarkozy would treat national security and foreign affairs as the "reserved domain" of the presidency.

On 6 November 2007, Levitte was among the guests invited to the state dinner hosted by President George W. Bush in honor of President Nicolas Sarkozy at the White House.

Levitte left office on May 15, 2012 following Sarkozy's defeat in the 2012 presidential election, and joined Rock Creek Global Advisors in Washington, DC.

== Other activities ==
- Club of Three, Member of the Steering Group
- European Council on Foreign Relations (ECFR), Member of the Council
- French Institute of International Relations (IFRI), Member of the Strategic Advisory Board
- Paris School of International Affairs (PSIA), Member of the Strategic Committee
- World Economic Forum (WEF), Member of the Global Future Council on Geopolitics (2018-2019)
- Geneva Centre for Security Policy (GCSP), President of the Foundation Council (2019-)
