= Permanent Mission of France to the United Nations =

Coordinates: 40°45′12.2″N 73°58′11.4″W

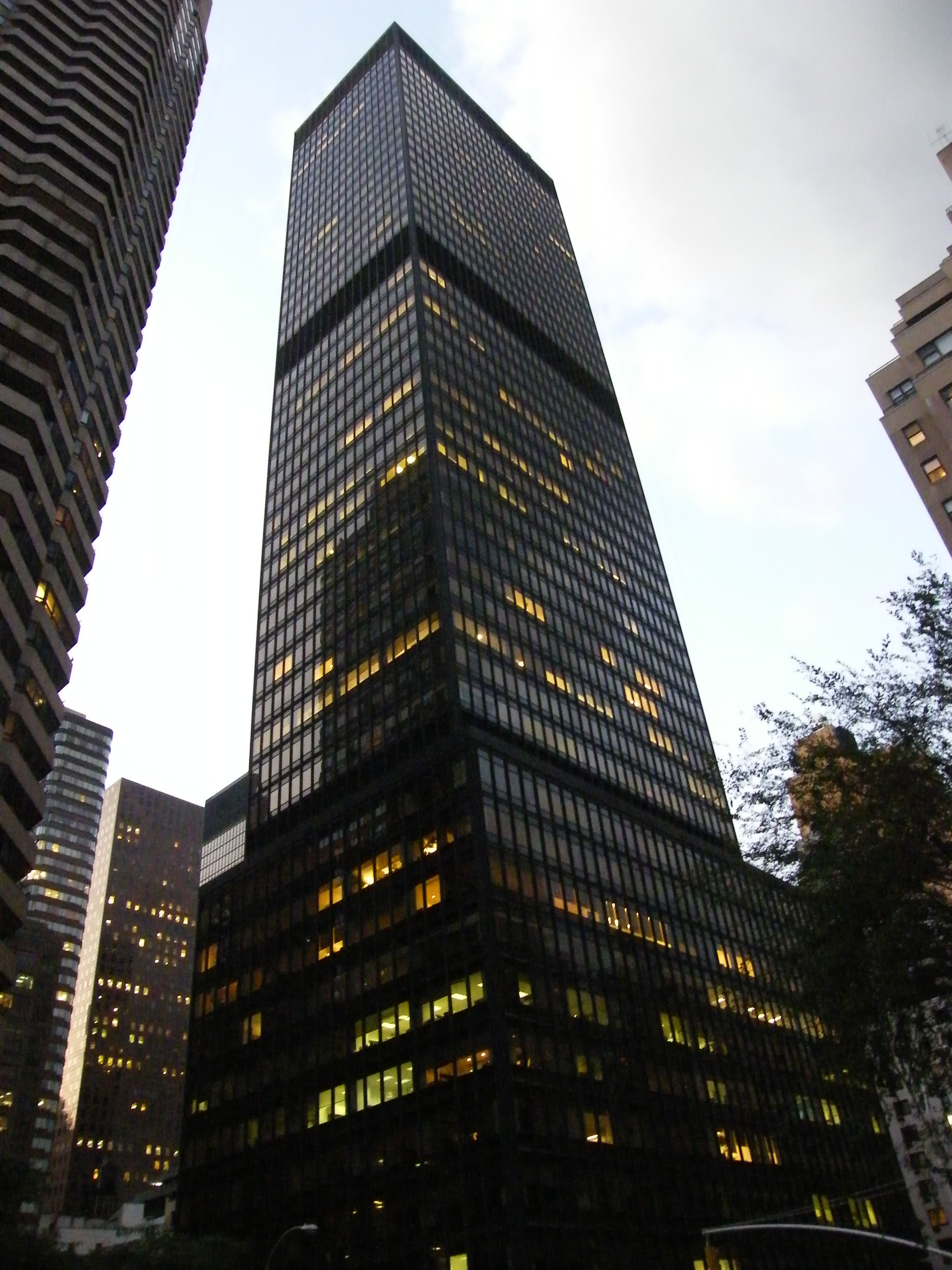
- Seat of the Permanent Mission at One Dag Hammarskjöld Plaza
- Address: 245 East 47th Street, Fl.44, New York, NY 10128, United States
- Opened: 1946; 80 years ago
- Ambassador: Jérôme Bonnafont
- Website: onu.delegfrance.org

The Permanent Mission of France to the United Nations (French: Mission permanente de la France auprès des Nations unies) is the diplomatic mission of the French Republic to the United Nations in New York. As such, it reports to the Ministry for Europe and Foreign Affairs. It is headed by the Permanent Representative of France to the United Nations.

== Location ==
Since 1991, the offices of the Permanent Mission of France to the United Nations have been located at One Dag Hammarskjöld Plaza, 43rd and 44th floor in Manhattan, New York, at the corner of 2nd Avenue and 47th and 48th Streets, close to the United Nations Headquarters.

== Role ==
The Permanent Mission of France to the United Nations is led by Ambassador Jérôme Bonnafont, Permanent Representative of France to the United Nations, formerly, inter alia, ambassador to India, Spain, and the United Nations Office at Geneva. He presented his credentials to António Guterres, UN Secretary-General, on 17 March 2025.

The Permanent Mission acts as the interface between the United Nations' authorities in New York and the French authorities. The Permanent Representative and the Deputy Permanent Representative sit at the UN Security Council, of which France is one of the five permanent members, and on all the organs in which France is represented, notably the UN General Assembly, its various committees and the UN Economic and Social Council. They speak on behalf of France to promote its positions.

In order to successfully carry out its mandate, the Permanent Mission of France to the United Nations has nearly 80 staff members, including about 20 diplomats from the Ministry of Foreign and European Affairs, civil servants from other ministries, notably the Ministry of Defense and the Ministry of Economy, Industry and Employment. They prepare and negotiate resolutions and texts for adoption by the various UN organs. The Permanent Mission endeavors to promote the use of French in the work of the UN.

Staff members of the Permanent Mission of France to the United Nations also organize visits by the French authorities to the UN headquarters, notably during the general debate that opens the annual session of the UN General Assembly, which traditionally takes place in September.

The Permanent Mission includes the Military Mission of France to the United Nations as well as a financial agency and its commercial department which represents the Ministry for the Economy, Industry, and Employment.

The military mission is mainly responsible for monitoring UN peacekeeping operations and the use of national military and police contributions. It is led by Head of the Defense Mission Roland Margueritte who is also the representative of the Chief of the Defense Staff for the French armed forces to the UN Military Staff Committee.

A detachment of the national police is responsible for ensuring the security of the premises of the Permanent Mission at all times.

== Other French representation in the UN system ==
- To the UN offices:
  - Permanent Representation of France to the United Nations Office at Geneva
  - Permanent Representation of France to the United Nations Office and International Organizations in Vienna
  - Permanent Representation of France to the United Nations Office at Nairobi (assumed by the Embassy of France to Kenya)
- To the other UN organs :
  - Permanent Representation of France to the Conference on Disarmament in Geneva
  - Permanent Representation of France to the United Nations Agencies for Food and Agriculture in Rome

== Notes ==
1. The new Permanent Representative of France to the United Nations presents his credentials [archive], communiqué issued by the United Nations Department of Public Information, 10 September 2009 (in French)
2. The Deputy Permanent Representative [archive], website of the Permanent Mission of France to the United Nations (in French)

== See also ==
- List of diplomatic missions of France
- Permanent Representative of France to the United Nations
- United Nations Security Council
