= Catherine Colonna =

French diplomat and politician (born 1956)

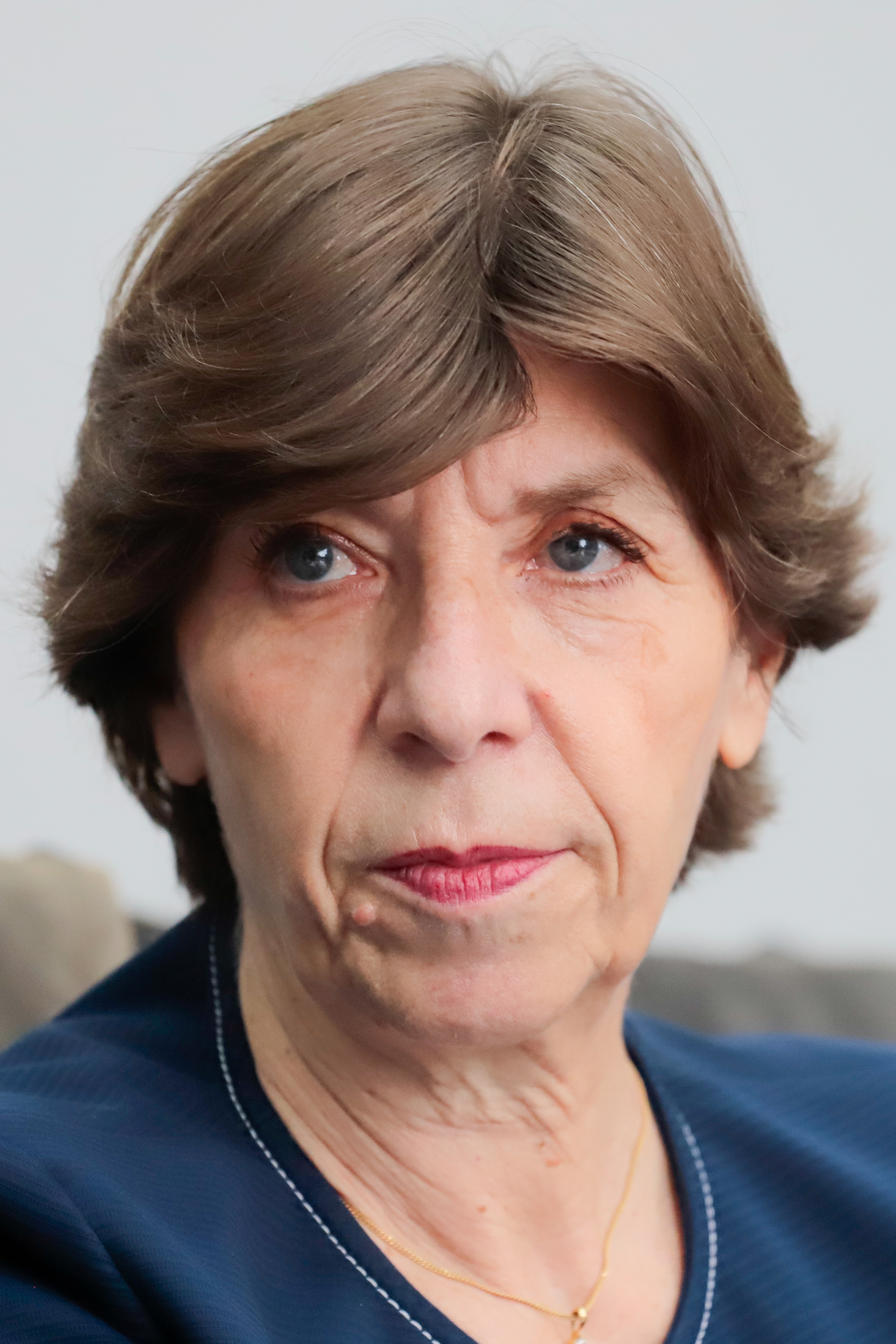
- Colonna in 2023

Minister for Europe and Foreign Affairs
- In office 20 May 2022 – 11 January 2024
- Prime Minister: Élisabeth Borne
- Preceded by: Jean-Yves Le Drian
- Succeeded by: Stéphane Séjourné

Ambassador of France to the United Kingdom
- In office 2 September 2019 – 20 May 2022
- President: Emmanuel Macron
- Preceded by: Jean-Pierre Jouyet
- Succeeded by: Hélène Tréheux-Duchêne

Permanent Representative of France to OECD
- In office 4 October 2017 – 2 September 2019
- President: Emmanuel Macron
- Preceded by: Pierre Duquesne
- Succeeded by: Jean-Pierre Jouyet

Ambassador of France to Italy
- In office 1 September 2014 – 21 September 2017
- President: François Hollande; Emmanuel Macron
- Preceded by: Alain Le Roy
- Succeeded by: Christian Masset

Permanent Representative of France to UNESCO
- In office 26 March 2008 – 22 December 2010
- President: Nicolas Sarkozy
- Preceded by: Joëlle Bourgois
- Succeeded by: Rama Yade

Minister for European Affairs
- In office 2 June 2005 – 15 May 2007
- Prime Minister: Dominique de Villepin
- Preceded by: Claudie Haigneré
- Succeeded by: Jean-Pierre Jouyet

Personal details
- Born: Catherine Jeanne Béatrice Colonna; 16 April 1956 (age 70) Tours, France
- Education: University of Tours; Sciences Po; École nationale d'administration
- Occupation: Diplomat

Catherine Jeanne Béatrice Colonna (French: [katʁin kɔlɔna]; born 16 April 1956) is a French diplomat and politician who served as Minister for Europe and Foreign Affairs in the government of Prime Minister Élisabeth Borne from May 2022 to January 2024.

Colonna previously served as Ambassador of France to the United Kingdom (2019–2022), Ambassador of France to Italy (2014–2017), Permanent Representative to OECD (2017–2019) and Permanent Representative to UNESCO (2008–2010).

== Early life and education ==
Colonna was born in Tours in the Centre-Val de Loire region. Colonna was the daughter of a farmer of Corsican origin. After obtaining a master's degree in public law at the Université François-Rabelais of Tours, she pursued her studies at the Institut d'études politiques de Paris (public service) then École nationale d'administration (ENA) in the class of 1983 (Promotion Solidarité).

== Career in the diplomatic service ==
In 1983, Colonna entered diplomatic service being appointed to the Embassy of France in the United States, first in the political department, then in the press and information department.

Upon her return to Paris, Colonna oversaw European Law at the Legal Affairs Directorate of the Ministry of Foreign Affairs from 1986 to 1988. In 1988, she was promoted Technical Advisor in Minister of Public Works Maurice Faure's cabinet, under the presidency of François Mitterrand. In 1989, shortly before the fall of the Berlin Wall, she joined the Analysis and Forecasting Centre at the Ministry of Foreign Affairs, where she was put in charge of European Affairs. She later became spokeswoman of the Ministry of Foreign Affairs in 1990, in the department of Communication and Information, a position she held for five years.

In 1993, Minister of Foreign Affairs Alain Juppé and Cabinet Director Dominique de Villepin named Colonna deputy spokeswoman. Two years later, in May 1995, newly-installed President Jacques Chirac appointed her spokeswoman for the Élysée. For the following nine years, she served as the official voice of the French Republic's presidency, then left office to work as Director General of the National Centre of Cinematography (CNC) in September 2004.

Following the European Constitution referendum, Colonna returned to diplomacy, being appointed Minister Delegate for European Affairs in Prime Minister Dominique de Villepin's newly-formed government on 2 June 2005. She remained in position for two years, until 15 May 2007. From autumn 2007 until summer 2008, Colonna participated in the Commission on the White Paper on Foreign and European policy of France, led by Alain Juppé.

On 26 March 2008, Colonna was appointed the French Permanent Representative to UNESCO.

== Career in the private sector ==
Since May 2008, Colonna was a member of the Fondation Chirac's Board of Directors, and was a member of the Franco-British Council.

From May 2010, Colonna also chaired the Board of Governors of the École du Louvre.

In December 2010, Colonna joined the Paris office of international financial communications firm Brunswick as managing partner.

== Return to the diplomatic service ==
Colonna was appointed the French Ambassador to Rome on 14 August 2014. She became Permanent Representative to OECD in 2017, before being appointed the French Ambassador to London in 2019.

Amid a 2021 dispute between the United Kingdom and France over post-Brexit fishing licenses, then UK Foreign Secretary Liz Truss instructed Minister of State for Europe, Wendy Morton, to summon Colonna "to explain the disappointing and disproportionate threats made against the UK and Channel Islands."

== Minister for Europe and Foreign Affairs, 2022–2024 ==
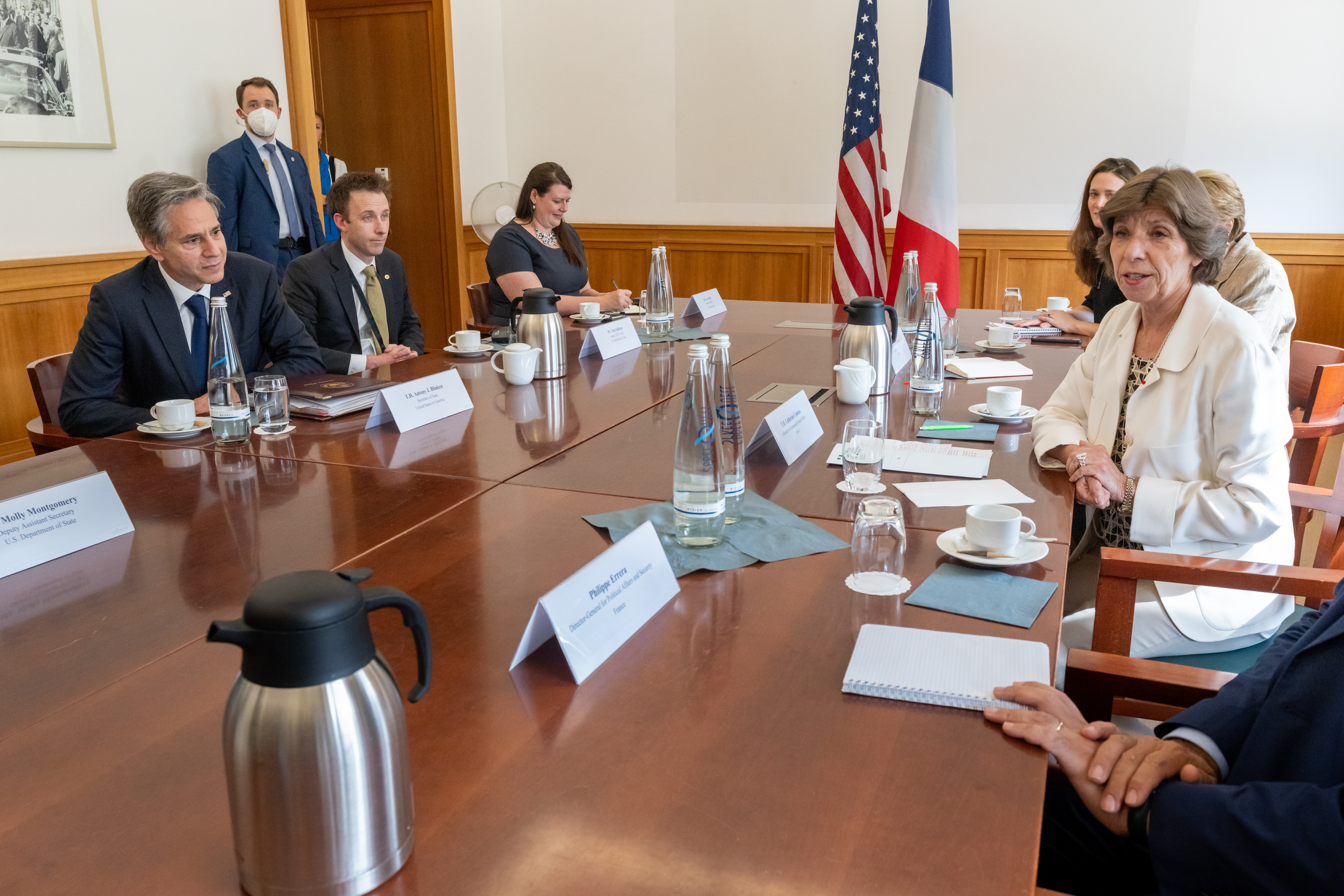
Colonna with Antony Blinken in 2022

In May 2022, Colonna was named Foreign Minister in the Borne government. She was the second woman to hold this office, after the short stint by Michèle Alliot-Marie in 2010.

Early in her tenure, Colonna and Minister of the Armed Forces Sébastien Lecornu travelled to Niger together to seal a regional redeployment, making the country the hub for French troops in the Sahel region.

In January 2023, Colonna and German Foreign Minister Annalena Baerbock arrived in Ethiopia and met with Ethiopian Prime Minister Abiy Ahmed on a mission to support the Ethiopia–Tigray peace agreement ending the Tigray War.

Following the 2023 Nigerien coup d'état, Colonna expressed support for reversing the coup following a meeting with former Nigerien prime minister Ouhoumoudou Mahamadou.

In September 2023, Colonna said France would hold Azerbaijan "responsible for the fate of Armenians of Nagorno-Karabakh."

== Tayeb Benabderrahmane case ==
Franco-Algerian consultant Tayeb Benabderrahmane was arrested by Qatari security services in January 2020 in Doha on accusations of espionage on behalf of a foreign state. He was detained for several months — later denouncing unlawful detention and ill-treatment — before being placed under house arrest. His release in late October 2020 was conditioned on signing a confidentiality protocol barring him from disclosing documents allegedly compromising for Paris Saint-Germain president Nasser Al-Khelaifi, under penalty of a €5 million fine. According to his lawyers, the French Ministry of Foreign Affairs had been informed as early as 5 March 2020 of his arbitrary detention and of the human rights violations against him, but no consular assistance was provided.

After his return to France, Benabderrahmane filed a complaint in 2022 for kidnapping, unlawful detention, and torture. A French judicial investigation was opened in February 2023. On 31 May 2023, a criminal court in Doha sentenced him to death in absentia by firing squad for "intelligence with a foreign power," a verdict delivered without his knowledge while he was already back in France. The Qatari authorities did not publicly disclose this judgment, and the French authorities only learned of the conviction through diplomatic channels in July 2023. In April 2023, the Qatari Prime Minister Mohammed bin Abdulrahman Al-Thani had already sent a letter to French Foreign Minister Catherine Colonna contesting the Paris investigation — deemed "baseless" by Doha — and recalling that Benabderrahmane, accused of "serious crimes," was wanted by Qatari justice.

On 5 July 2023, French police boarded the plane of Nasser Al-Khelaifi at Le Bourget Airport to search the aircraft and question him in the ongoing judicial inquiry. Al-Khelaifi refused to leave his jet for over an hour while his lawyers and Qatari representatives negotiated with the officers. A Qatari diplomat intervened on the tarmac, claiming Al-Khelaifi enjoyed diplomatic immunity as a minister without portfolio and stated that the Qatari ambassador had alerted Colonna. According to this account, Colonna contacted her Interior Ministry counterpart to halt the police operation, a claim categorically denied by the Quai d'Orsay, which maintained that Colonna received no such call and did not intervene "at any level".

On 21 July 2023, in reaction to the Le Bourget incident, the Qatari government sent an official letter to Colonna via its Prime Minister. The letter protested the treatment of Al-Khelaifi by French investigators and stressed that the operation could have been carried out "at a more appropriate time (…) without damaging his reputation or that of Qatar." The letter also reiterated Benabderrahmane's arrest in Doha in January 2020, his detention and house arrest, and his authorised departure from the emirate on 31 October 2020. It further informed French authorities of the death sentence handed down in absentia a few weeks earlier. No public reaction followed from the French Ministry of Foreign Affairs: no protest against the death sentence nor any consular support was provided. In September 2023, the Quai d'Orsay even stated that it had "received no request for consular protection" in 2020 regarding Benabderrahmane.

Due to this lack of consular and diplomatic support, Benabderrahmane decided to pursue legal action after learning of his conviction through the press. On 12 December 2024, his lawyers filed a complaint before the Court of Justice of the Republic against Colonna for "failure to render assistance to a person in danger". The complaint, also based on "endangering the life of others" and "failure to comply with judicial requisitions," accused the French Foreign Minister of deliberately failing to inform Benabderrahmane of his death sentence and of taking no action to protect him, even though she had been notified of his situation. According to his lawyers, "Ms. Colonna voluntarily refrained from warning Mr. Benabderrahmane of his death sentence, thereby exposing him to an obvious lethal risk." The Ministry of Foreign Affairs declined to comment on these accusations, while the judicial investigation remains ongoing.

== Later career ==
In February 2024, Colonna was appointed by United Nations Secretary-General António Guterres to lead an independent review group to look into accusations by Israel that 12 staff members of the United Nations Relief and Works Agency for Palestine Refugees in the Near East (UNRWA) were involved in the 2023 Hamas-led attack on Israel.

== Honours ==
=== French ===
- : Officer of the Legion of Honour
- : Officer of the National Order of Merit
- : Commander of the Order of Arts and Letters

=== Foreign ===
- : Medal of the Oriental Republic of Uruguay (1997)
- : Grand Officer of the Order of the Star of Italy (2 June 2018)
- : Order of Princess Olga, 3rd Class (30 December 2022)
- : Grand Cordon of the Order of the Rising Sun (2024)

Political offices
Preceded by Claudie Haigneré	Minister for European Affairs; 2005–2007	Succeeded by Jean-Pierre Jouyet
Preceded by Jean-Yves Le Drian	Minister for Europe and Foreign Affairs; 2022–2024	Succeeded by Stéphane Séjourné
Diplomatic posts
Preceded by Alain Le Roy	Ambassador of France to Italy; 2014–2017	Succeeded by Christian Masset
Preceded by Jean-Pierre Jouyet	Ambassador of France to the United Kingdom; 2019–2022	Succeeded by Hélène Tréheux-Duchêne
