= Brazilian nobility =

Social class in the Kingdom and later Empire of Brazil

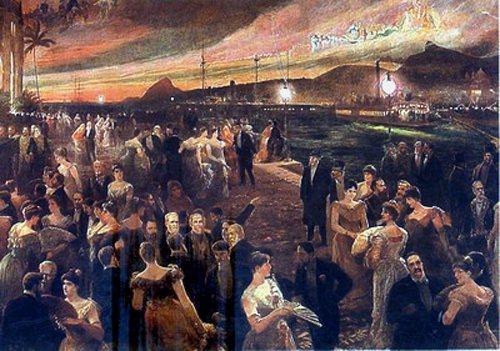
The Last Empire Ball, on 9 November 1889 at Ilha Fiscal by Aurélio de Figueiredo.

The Brazilian nobility (Portuguese: nobreza do Brasil) refers to the titled aristocrats and fidalgo people and families recognized by the Kingdom of Brazil and later, by the Empire of Brazil, dating back to the early 19th century, when Brazil ceased to be a colony of the Kingdom of Portugal. It held official status until 1889, when a military coup d'état overthrew the monarchy and established the First Brazilian Republic.

== History ==
Noble Titles of Brazil
Titles
Dukedoms of Brazil
Marquisates of Brazil
Counties of Brazil
Viscountcies of Brazil
Baronies of Brazil

The Brazilian nobility originated from the Portuguese nobility, during the time of colonial Brazil; the noble titles were a sign of political power among the elite. Some of the nobles were members of Portuguese noble lineages and even of the high nobility, especially the families that arrived during the first centuries of the colonization of Bahia, Sergipe, Pernambuco, Rio de Janeiro and São Paulo. The elevation of Brazil to the status of Kingdom, under the United Kingdom of Portugal, Brazil and the Algarves in 1815, led to the creation of the first Brazilian noble titles. With the Independence of Brazil from Portugal in 1822, the Empire of Brazil established its own system of nobility.

According to the Brazilian Constitution of 1824, only the Emperor had the right to confer titles and ranks on non-nobles. Unlike the former Portuguese and Luso-Brazilian titles—and most systems of aristocracy—a Brazilian noble title was only for the holder's lifetime and could not be inherited, similar to a British life peer. All nobles, regardless of title and rank, were entitled to the style of Excellency.

During the reign of Dom Pedro II and the advent of the commercialization of coffee, it was the great coffee-growers who began to collect such titles, being acquaintances of the coffee barons. According to Affonso de Taunay, around 300 holders had their income linked to coffee: farmers, bankers and traders. The title of baron thus became a symbol of the legitimization of local power, making those who held it intermediaries between the people and the government.

During this period the Brazilian Imperial Family sought to efface republican sentiments with a wide distribution of titles, mainly among important political leaders in the provinces, some aristocrats and also members of provincial oligarchies; 114 were awarded in 1888, and 123 in 1889.

=== Republic ===
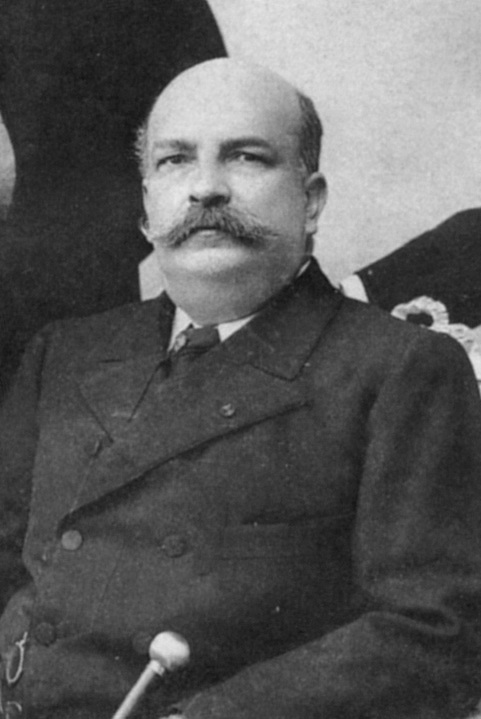
José Paranhos, Baron of Rio Branco, famous diplomat who served in both imperial and republican governments.

With the proclamation of the republic in 1889, the aristocracy was abolished and all Brazilian titles of nobility were banned. It was also prohibited, under penalty of accusation of high treason and the suspension of political rights, to accept noble titles and foreign decorations without the permission of the State. However, nobles of greater distinction, out of respect and tradition, were allowed to use their titles during the republican regime; a well-known example is the Baron of Rio Branco. The Imperial Family was not allowed to return until 1921, when the Law of Exile was repealed by President Epitácio Pessoa.

== Acquisition ==
To be qualified for ennoblement, one could not be of illegitimate birth or be previously charged for lese-majeste. Most had to pay a large sum for the conferral of noble status (the Portuguese monarchs sold titles for payment to raise funds giving Portugal many nobles, 600+ families, for a small population), even if titles passed to their descendants.

A recipient had to pay the following fees depending on the title given, in contos de réis, according to the table of April 2, 1860:

Register Value in 1860
| Title | Value |
|---|---|
| Duke | 2:450$000 |
| Marquis | 2:020$000 |
| Count | 1:575$000 |
| Viscount | 1:025$000 |
| Baron | 750$000 |

In addition to these amounts, there were the following costs:

- Roles for the petition: 366$000
- Coat of arms registration: 170$000

A list of possible grantees was drawn up by the Council of Ministers, with recommendations from their colleagues, provincial presidents, other nobles, politicians, senior officials, and other influential people. The lists were sent to the approval of the Emperor, being presented, twice a year: December 2, the anniversary of the Emperor; March 14 or 25, respectively, the anniversary of the Empress and the anniversary of the oath of the Constitution of the Brazilian Empire of 1824—the first Brazilian constitutional charter.

Some Brazilian nobles were given the distinction "with grandeeship," which allowed them to use in their coat of arms the crown of the next higher title—for example, a baron could wear the viscount's coronet on his coat of arms. Also, a Grandee of the Empire enjoyed other privileges and precedence that holders of the next superior title enjoyed. The grandeeship was conferred on 135 barons, who used the viscomital coronet in their coats of arms, and 146 viscounts, who used the comital coronet.

== Registration of nobility ==
All records of the nobility were made in the books of the Office of Nobility and Knighthood until 1848, when they disappeared under unexplained circumstances. At the time, they were the responsibility of Possidonio da Fonseca Costa, the then-King of Arms, which greatly hindered the registration of noble titles granted during the First Reign of the Empire. Luis Aleixo Boulanger, his successor, sought to recover part of this documentation, producing a single book with part of the first generation of the Brazilian nobility.

Throughout the entirety of the Empire's existence, 1,211 titles of nobility were created: 3 dukes, 47 marquises, 51 counts, 235 viscounts and 875 barons. The total number of recipients, however, was lower—around 980—as many received more than one title. These numbers are not entirely accurate, as there are doubts about the validity and even the existence of some titles. Much of this doubt stems from the loss of some of the records of the Office of Nobility and Knighthood during the Brazilian First Republic.

== Untitled nobility ==
Brazilian nobility comprised also a large body of untitled nobles, some ennobled for life by holding civic or military offices, and others by tradition. In the first class stood all people distinguished by imperial honorific orders; all officers-majors (oficiais-mores) working for the Court; high military officers; high magistrates such as State councillors, judges, senators and ministers, as well as big merchants, lawyers and doctors of liberal arts. The second group of hereditary untitled nobility comprised the landed gentry.

== Symbols ==
=== Royal titles ===
| Emperor (Imperador) | Prince Imperial of Brazil (Príncipe Imperial do Brasil) | Prince of Grão-Pará (Príncipe do Grão-Pará) | Prince of Brazil (Príncipe do Brasil) |

=== Noble titles ===
| Duke (Duque) | Marquis (Marquês) | Count (Conde) | Viscount (Visconde) | Baron (Barão) |

== Famous nobles ==
Coat of arms of the Marquess of Maranhão.

=== Dukes ===
- Auguste de Beauharnais, Duke of Santa Cruz, Prince Consort of Portugal
- Luís Alves de Lima e Silva, Duke of Caxias, military general
- Isabel Maria de Alcântara, Duchess of Goiás, illegitimate daughter of Emperor Pedro I

=== Marquesses ===
- Pedro de Araújo Lima, Marquis of Olinda
- Domitila de Castro do Canto e Melo, Marchioness of Santos
- Thomas Cochrane, 10th Earl of Dundonald, 1st Marquess of Maranhão
- Honório Hermeto Carneiro Leão, Marquis of Paraná
- Manuel Luís Osório, Marquis of Erval
- Joaquim Marques Lisboa, Marquis of Tamandaré
- José da Costa Carvalho, Marquis of Monte Alegre
- José Antônio Pimenta Bueno, Marquis of São Vicente
- João Lustosa da Cunha Paranaguá, Marquis of Paranaguá

=== Counts ===
- Joaquim Xavier Curado, Count of São João das Duas Barras
- Luísa Margarida de Barros Portugal, Countess of Barral
- Mariana Carlota de Verna Magalhães Coutinho, Countess of Belmonte
- Manuel Marques de Sousa, Count of Porto Alegre
- José Antônio Moreira, Count of Ipanema

=== Viscounts ===
- Alfredo d'Escragnolle Taunay, Viscount of Taunay
- Afonso Celso, Viscount of Ouro Preto
- Francisco Adolfo de Varnhagen, Viscount of Porto Seguro
- Irineu Evangelista de Sousa, Viscount of Mauá
- José Paranhos, Viscount of Rio Branco
- Joaquim José Inácio, Viscount of Inhaúma
- Domingos Custódio Guimarães, Viscount of Rio Preto
- Joaquim Henrique de Araújo, Viscount of Pirassununga
- Carlos Frederico Lecor, Viscount of Laguna
- Paulino Soares de Sousa, 1st Viscount of Uruguai
- Gonçalves de Magalhães, Viscount of Araguaia
- José da Silva Lisboa, Viscount of Cairu
- João Lins Cansanção, Viscount of Sinimbu
- Francisco de Sales Torres Homem, Viscount of Inhomirim
- Rufino Galvão, Viscount of Maracaju
- Henrique de Beaurepaire-Rohan, Viscount of Beaurepaire-Rohan
- Manuel Alves Branco, 2nd Viscount of Caravelas
- Aureliano Coutinho, Viscount of Sepetiba
- José Carlos Pereira de Almeida Torres, Viscount of Macaé
- Marcos Antônio de Araújo, Viscount of Itajubá
- José Antônio Correia da Câmara, 2nd Viscount of Pelotas
- Polidoro Jordão, Viscount of Santa Teresa
- Alexandre Gomes de Argollo Ferrão Filho, Viscount of Itaparica

=== Barons ===
- José Maria da Silva Paranhos Júnior, Baron of Rio Branco
- Henrique Hermeto Carneiro Leão, Baron of Paraná
- Gregório Francisco de Miranda, Baron of Abadia
- Domingos Custódio Guimarães Filho, 2nd Baron of Rio Preto
- José Pedro da Motta Sayão, Baron of Pilar
- Antônio Luiz von Hoonholtz, Baron of Teffé
- José Antônio Moreira Filho, 2nd Baron of Ipanema
- Francisco Paulo de Almeida, Baron of Guaraciaba
- Francisco Manuel Barroso, Baron of Amazonas
- José Joaquim de Andrade Neves, Baron of Triunfo
- Leonel Martiniano de Alencar, 1st Baron of Alencar
- Manuel de Araújo Porto-Alegre, Baron of Santo Ângelo
- Hermenegildo Portocarrero, Baron of Forte de Coimbra
- Delfim Carlos de Carvalho, Baron of Passagem
- Luís Gonçalves das Chagas, Baron of Candiota
- Bento Martins de Meneses, Baron of Ijuí
- Vitorino José Carneiro Monteiro, Baron of São Borja
- Ângelo Moniz da Silva Ferraz, Baron of Uruguaiana
- Manuel Antônio Ribeiro de Castro, Baron of Santa Rita
- Manuel Jorge Rodrigues, 1st Baron of Taquari
- Ambrósio Leitão da Cunha, Baron of Mamoré
- Marcos Antônio de Araújo, 2nd Baron of Itajubá
- Émile Mallet, Baron of Itapevi
- João Cardoso de Meneses e Sousa, Baron of Paranapiacaba
- Salustiano Jerônimo dos Reis, Baron of Camaquã
- Augusto Leverger, Baron of Melgaço
- Tomás Antônio Maciel Monteiro, 1st Baron of Itamaracá
- Geraldo Ribeiro de Sousa Resende, Baron Geraldo of Resende
- Geraldo Augusto de Resende, Baron of Retiro
- Gastão d'Escragnolle, Baron d'Escragnolle

== Literature ==
- Schwarcz, Lilia Moritz. As barbas do Imperador: D. Pedro II, um monarca nos trópicos. 2. Ed. São Paulo: Companhia das Letras, 1998.
- Vainfas, Ronaldo (2002). Dicionário do Brasil Imperial (in Portuguese). Rio de Janeiro: Objetiva. ISBN 978-85-7302-441-8.
