= Alexandre de Forth-Rouen =

Élie Sophie Alexandre, Baron Forth-Rouen des Mallets (May 1809 – 13 December 1886) was a French diplomat.

== Early life ==
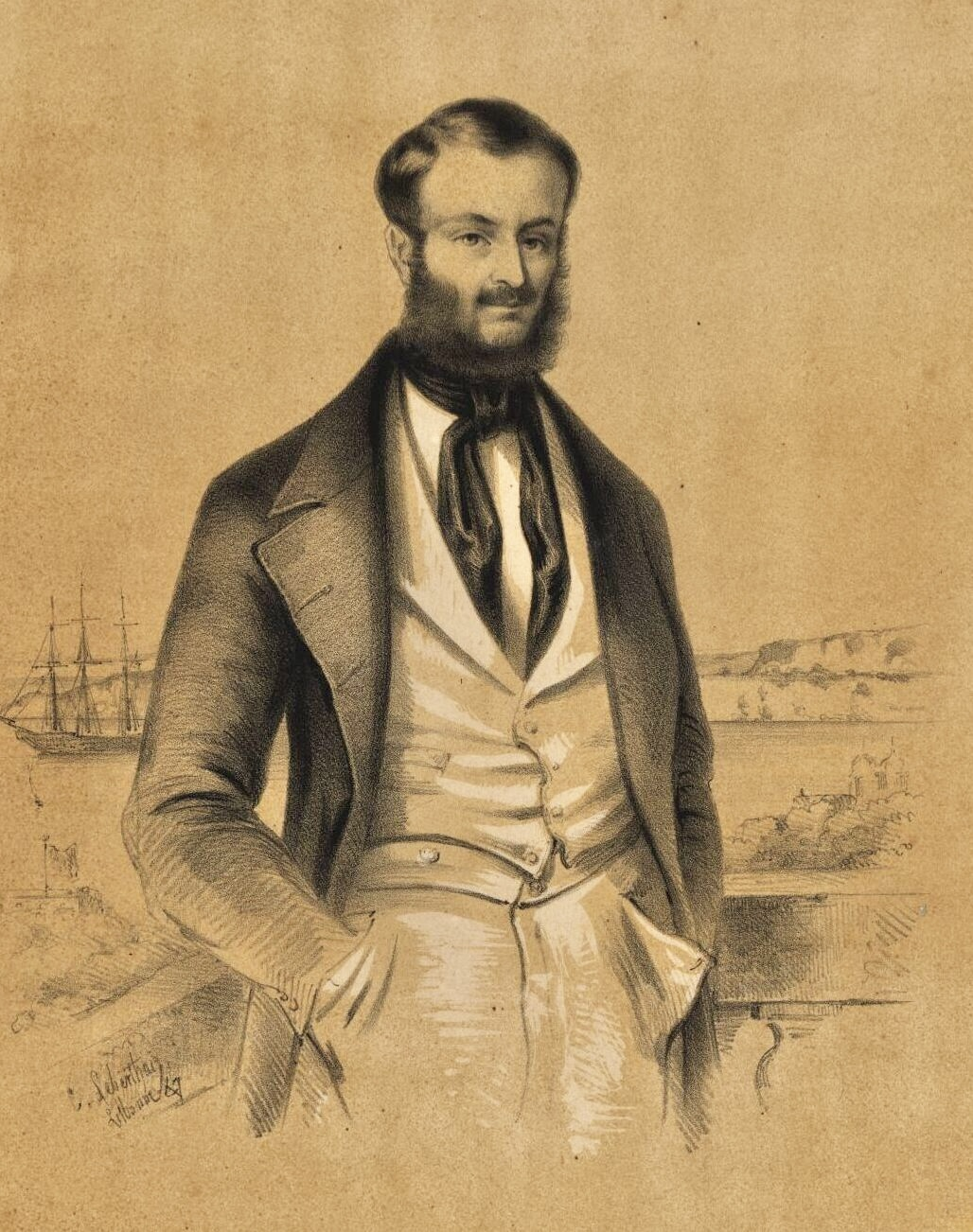
Alexandre Forth-Rouen in 1844

Alexandre was born in London in May 1809. He was the youngest son of diplomat Nathaniel Parker Forth (1744–1809) and Eliza Petrie (1784–1864). His father was King George III's private envoy to the Courts of Versailles and Madrid. From his parents' marriage, he had several siblings, including Frederick Henry Alexander Forth (Lt. Gov. in the British West Indies and the Colonial Treasurer of Hong Kong) and Eliza Parker Forth (wife of the Hon. Jabez Henry). After his father's death in April 1809, shortly before his birth, his mother married Alexandre-Jean-Denis Rouen des Mallets, the Mayor of Taverny, with whom she had another daughter, Louise Rouen des Mallets (who married Charles Louis, Viscount Terray de Morel-Vindé in 1839), Alexandre's half-sister.

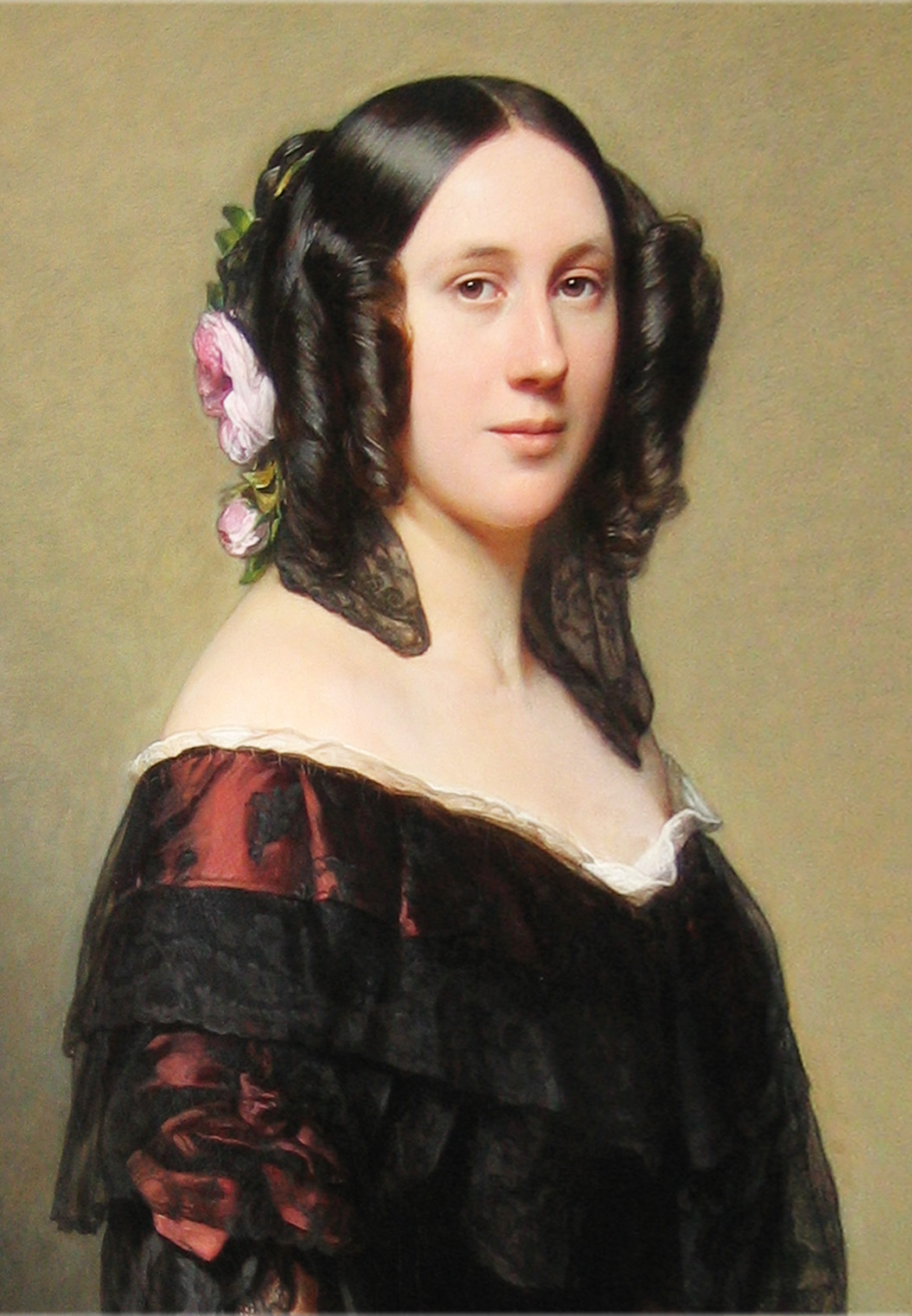
Portrait of his sister, Viscountess Terray de Morel-Vindé, by Hermann Winterhalter

His paternal grandfather was Sir Samuel Forth of Ludlow Castle. His maternal grandparents were Anne (née Keable) Petrie and John Petrie, a senior merchant in Calcutta in the 1780s. His niece, Edith Ann Mary Forth, married the Scottish tea merchant in Hong Kong, Phineas Ryrie. Another niece, Jeanne Marie Terray de Morel-Vindé, married Guy de Rohan-Chabot, Pontifical Duke of Ravese.

== Career ==
Forth-Rouen was appointed attaché of the Embassy of France, London in 1831, then secretary in Lisbon in 1841.

From 1845 to 1846, he was part of the French consulate in Macau, before serving as France's Minister to China in Beijing from 1847 to 1850. After his return from China, he was appointed the French Envoy to Greece from 1851 to 1854. He later served as Minister in Dresden. He was friends with Dr. Félix Hippolyte Larrey (son of Marie-Élisabeth Laville-Leroux and Dr. Dominique Jean Larrey).

== Personal life ==
In 1844, he married Portuguese born Maria Henriqueta d'Araújo (1824–1866), a daughter of Joaquim d'Araújo and Henriqueta Leonor Gomes (sister to Dr. Bernardino António Gomes Jr.). A cousin of Henrique de Barros Gomes, she was also related to Joaquim Henrique de Araujo, was created Viscount of Pirassununga in the Brazilian nobility, and married Luiza Bambina de Araújo (the daughter of Pedro de Araújo Lima, Marquis of Olinda, the prime minister of Brazil). Before her early death, Maria and Alexandre were the parents of:

- Marie-Henriette-Joséphine-Denise Forth-Rouen des Mallets (1862–1927), who married diplomat Edgar Le Marchand, a son of Louis Edmond Le Marchand.

His wife died while they were stationed in Dresden in 1866. Baron Forth-Rouen died in 1886.
