= Marcos Antônio de Araújo, 2nd Baron of Itajubá =

Brazilian jurist and diplomat

Marcos Antônio de Araújo
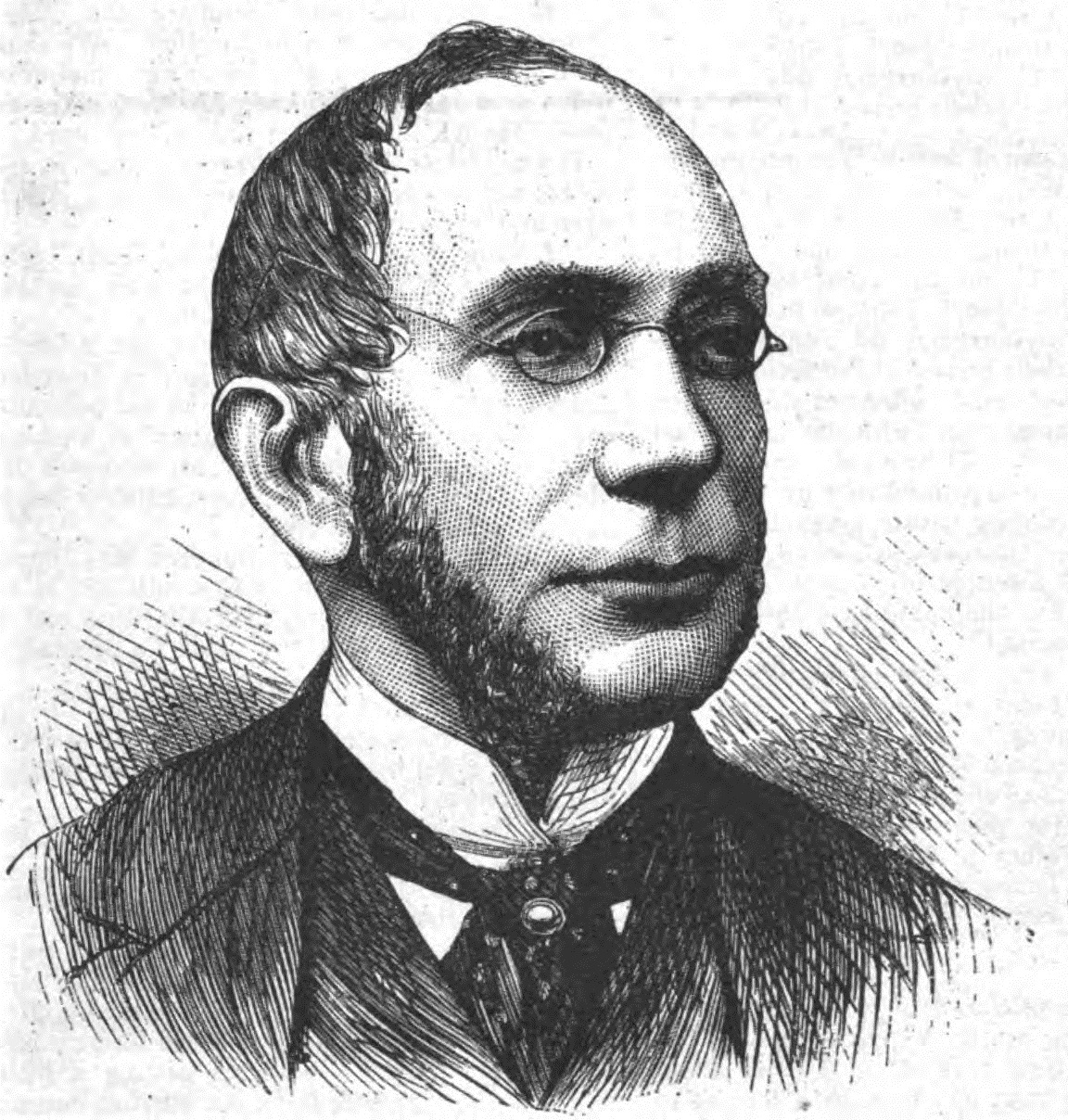
- Marcos Antônio de Araújo, 2nd Baron of Itajubá

Personal details
- Born: 8 February 1842 Hamburg
- Died: 3 November 1897 (aged 55) Berlin
- Alma mater: Federal University of Pernambuco
- Occupation: Jurist and diplomat

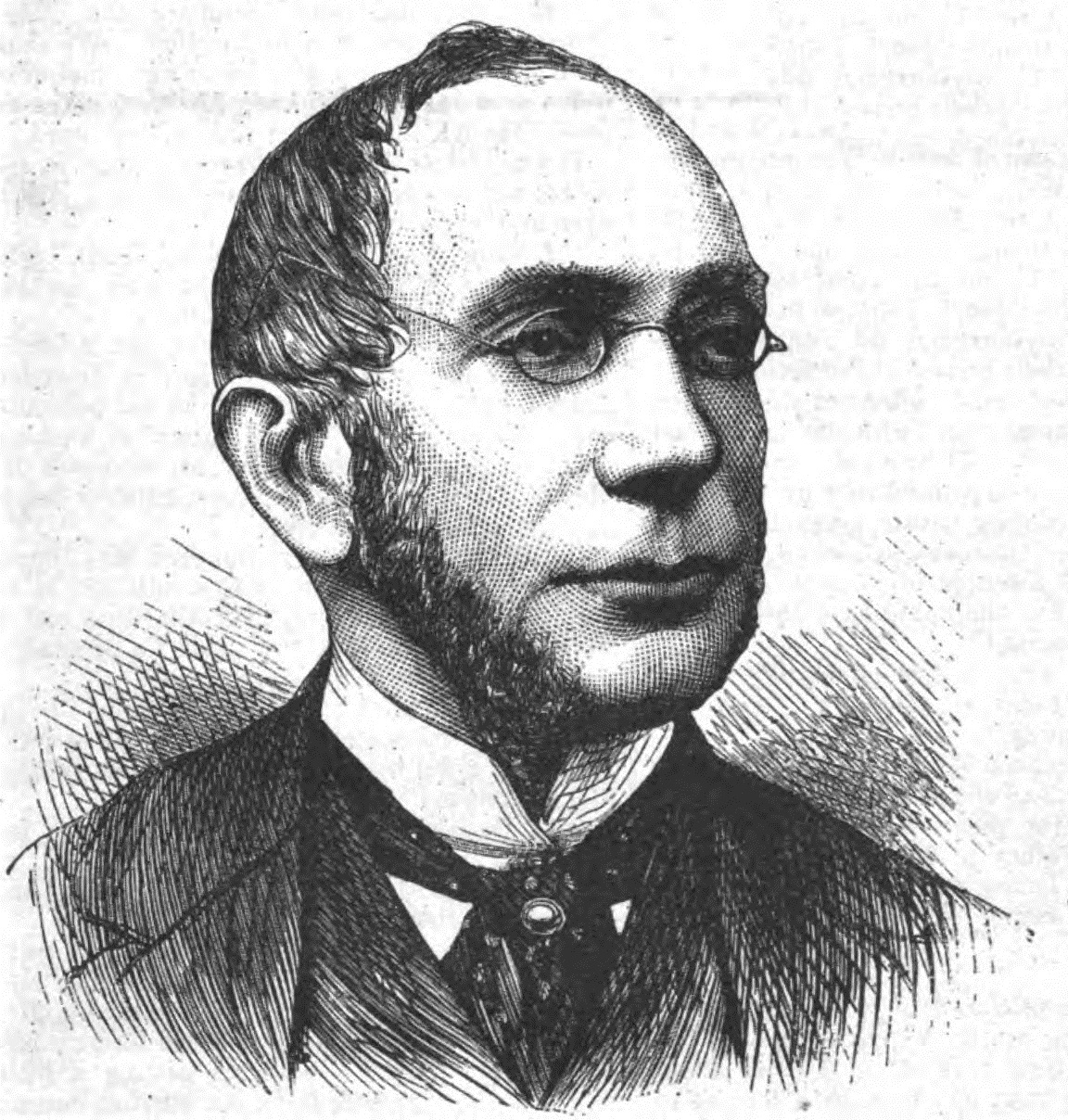

Marcos Antônio de Araújo, 2nd Baron of Itajubá (Hamburg, 8 February 1842 – Berlin, 3 November 1897) was a Brazilian jurist and diplomat. He was the son of Marcos Antônio de Araújo, Viscount of Itajubá.

He began his career as a professor of law at the Federal University of Pernambuco before becoming Consul General in Hamburg and later the second Ambassador in Hanover, Copenhagen, Berlin, and finally in Paris.

He was a member of the tribunal convened to arbitrate in the Alabama claims.
