= List of ambassadors of France to China =

French Ambassadors to China

Ambassador of the French Republic to the People's Republic of China
- Ambassadeur de la République française auprès de la République populaire de Chine
- Arms of the French Republic
- Incumbent; Bertrand Lortholary since February 14, 2023
- Style: His Excellency
- Nominator: Minister of Europe and Foreign Affairs
- Appointer: President of France with Council of Ministers meeting
- Inaugural holder: Alexandre de Forth-Rouen
- Formation: 1847

The list of ambassadors of France to China began after diplomatic relations were established in 1847. The official title of this French diplomat is "Ambassador Extraordinary and Plenipotentiary of the French Republic to the People's Republic of China".

== History ==
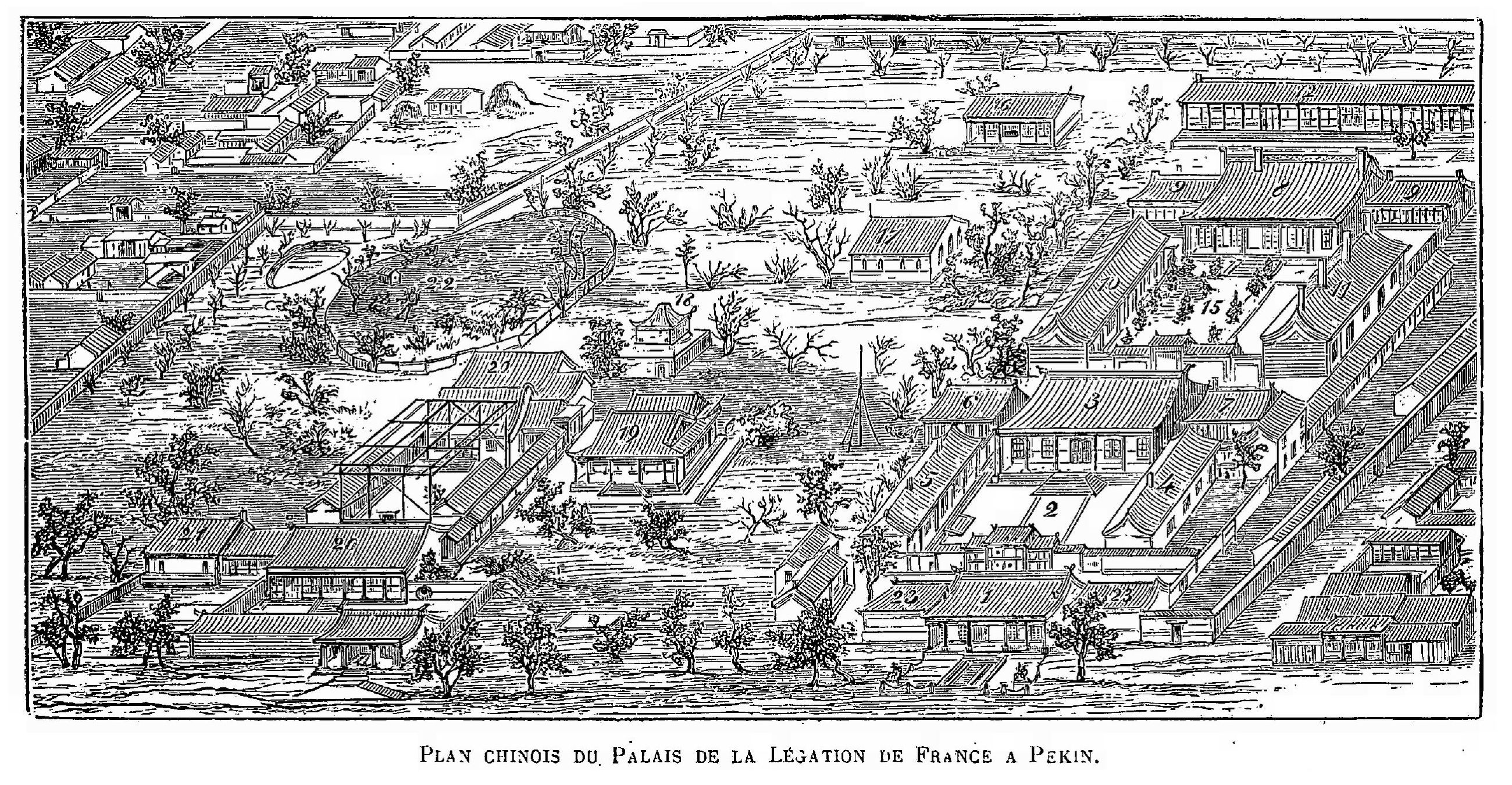
Palace of the French Legation in Beijing in 1860.

The first contacts between China and the West were established by Marco Polo in the 13th century. During the 16th, 17th and 18th centuries, missionaries continued the French settlement on Chinese soil. However, due to the remoteness of China, France, like most European countries, did not feel the need to establish diplomatic relations with the Chinese Empire for several centuries.

=== List of heads of mission ===
The updated list is available on the website of the French Embassy in Beijing.

Begins	Ends	Ambassador	Note
1847	1850	Baron Alexandre de Forth-Rouen	(Note: First representative of the permanent legation of France in China, mainly between Macao, Shanghai and Guangdong.)
1851	1862	Alphonse de Bourboulon	(Note: He established the first legation in Beijing in 1861, in a former imperial palace.)
1862	1866	Jules Berthemy	(Note: Returning to France in June 1865, he accredited Henry de Bellonet as chargé d'affaires.)
1866	1868	Count Charles de Lallemand	(Note: He arrived at his post in May 1867 and left it in November 1868.)
1868	1872	Count Julien de Rochechouart	
1872	1875	Louis de Geofroy	
1875	1879	Vicomte Brenier de Montmorand	
1879	1883	Albert Bourée	
1883	1883	Arthur Tricou	
1884	1886	Jules Patenôtre	
1886	1887	Jean Antoine Ernest Constans	
1887	1893	Gabriel Lemaire	
1893	1897	Auguste Gérard	
1898	1901	Stephen Pichon	
1901	1902	Jean-Baptiste Paul Beau	
1902	1905	Georges Dubail	
1906	1909	Edmond Bapst	
1909	1912	Pierre de Margerie	
1912	1917	Alexandre-Robert Conty	
1917	1921	Auguste Boppe	
1921	1924	Aimé Joseph de Fleuriau	
1925	1929	Damien de Martel	
1929	1933	Auguste Henry Wilden	
1933	1937	Henri Hoppenot	
1937	1938	Paul-Émile Naggiar	
1938	1944	Henri Cosme	
1944	1945	Zinovi Pechkoff	Delegate of the French Committee of National Liberation.
1945	1953	Jacques Meyrier	
1953	1956	Georges Cattand	Chargés d'affaires ad interim, based in Formosa, seat of the government in exile.
1956	1960	Amédée Beaulieux	Chargés d'affaires ad interim
1960	1963	Émile de Curton	Chargés d'affaires ad interim
1963	1964	Pierre Salade	Chargés d'affaires ad interim
1964	1969	Lucien Paye	First French ambassador to the People's Republic of China
1969	1975	Étienne Manac'h	
1975	1979	Claude Arnaud	
1979	1982	Claude Chayet	
1982	1986	Charles Malo	
1986	1989	Michel Combal	
1989	1990	Charles Malo	
1990	1993	Claude Martin	
1993	1996	François Plaisant	
1996	2002	Pierre Morel	
2002	2004	Jean-Pierre Lafon	
2004	2006	Philippe Guelluy	
2006	2010	Hervé Ladsous	
2011	2014	Sylvie Bermann	
2014	2017	Maurice Gourdault-Montagne	
2017	2019	Jean-Maurice Ripert	
2019	2023	Laurent Bili	
2023		Bertrand Lortholary	

=== Taiwan ===
The current regime ruling Taiwan comes from the exile on the island of Taiwan of the Chinese leaders after the communist revolution of 1949 and the end of the nationalist republican regime. The two governments have since then disputed the sovereignty of the entire Chinese territory. Although tending towards democracy according to the criteria of the European Union, the sovereignty of the country is not officially recognized. The seat occupied by the Republic of China at the United Nations was also lost in 1971 to the benefit of the People's Republic of China, which became the sole representative of China. Only 23 countries (but none in Asia, Europe or North America) out of the 192 that make up the UN recognize the Republic of China and maintain official diplomatic relations with it. France, for its part, is present thanks to the French Office in Taipei, which, although it has a role of representation at the political, economic and consular level, does not have the title of embassy, in order not to offend the People's Republic of China.

=== Consulates ===
In addition to the consular section of the embassy in Beijing, there are six consulates general of France in China, based in:

- Shanghai
- Guangdong
- Wuhan
- Chengdu
- Shenyang
- Hong Kong

== See also ==
- List of diplomatic missions in China
- List of diplomatic missions of France
- China–France relations
- China–European Union relations
