= Baron of Retiro =

Brazilian noble title

Baron of Retiro is a Brazilian noble title created by Pedro II of Brazil, by decree of August 11, 1889, in favor of Geraldo Augusto de Resende.
