= Frederick Forth =

British colonial administrator

Treasurer for the Island of Hong Kong
- In office 1857–1871
- Preceded by: Robert Rienaecker
- Succeeded by: Cecil Clementi Smith

Council President of the Turks and Caicos Islands
- In office 1848–1854
- Preceded by: Inaugural holder
- Succeeded by: William Robert Inglis

Personal details
- Born: Frederick Henry Alexander Forth; 11 February 1808 Lewisham, England
- Died: 7 April 1876 (aged 68) Tasmania, Australia
- Spouse: Caroline Jemima Sherson (m. 1831; died 1876)
- Relations: Alexandre de Forth-Rouen (brother)
- Parent(s): Nathaniel Parker Forth; Eliza Petrie

Frederick Henry Alexander Forth (11 February 1808 – 7 April 1876) was a British colonial administrator. He was Lieutenant-Governor in the British West Indies, Colonial Treasurer of Hong Kong and magistrate of Tasmania.

== Early life ==
Forth was born on 11 February 1808 to diplomat Nathaniel Parker Forth (1744–1809) and Eliza Petrie (1784–1864). His father was King George III's private envoy to the courts of Versailles and Madrid. From his parents' marriage, he had several siblings, including Alexandre de Forth-Rouen and Eliza Parker Forth (wife of the Hon. Jabez Henry). After his father's death in April 1809, shortly before his youngest brother's birth, his mother married Baron Alexandre-Jean-Denis Rouen des Mallets, the Mayor of Taverny, with whom she had another daughter, Louise Rouen des Mallets (who married Charles Louis, Viscount Terray de Morel-Vindé in 1839), Frederick's half-sister.

His paternal grandfather was Sir Samuel Forth of Ludlow Castle. His maternal grandparents were Anne (née Keable) Petrie and John Petrie, a senior merchant in Calcutta in the 1780s. His niece, Jeanne Marie Terray de Morel-Vindé, married Guy de Rohan-Chabot, Pontifical Duke of Ravese.

== Career ==
He was an army officer and lieutenant-governor in the British West Indies for some six years, where he was sent to initiate a government on the separation of those islands from the Bahamas. He was the Council President of the Turks and Caicos from 1848 to 1854. He was also the Colonial Treasurer of Hong Kong and ex officio member of the Legislative Council of Hong Kong. He was a captain in the Scots Fusiliers and was appointed by Governor Sir George Arthur in the first visiting magistracy created in Tasmania. He prepared the first code of standing regulations for the management of some thousands of European convicts employed upon the public works and roads of the colony.

== Personal life ==
On 27 December 1831, Forth was married to Caroline Jemima Sherson (1810–1878), a daughter of Robert Sherson and Catherine Taylor. Together, they were the parents of:

- Catherine Georgiana Forth, who married lord of the manor of Little Cawthorpe, John Bartholomew Parker, the eldest son of Lysimachus Parker and Sarah Green of Dowsby Hall, in 1862.
- Robert de Lancey Forth (1835–1890), who married Anne Thomson Ware, a daughter of Jeremiah George Ware, in 1877.
- Edith Ann Mary Forth (1841–1866), who married Phineas Ryrie, a Scottish tea merchant in Hong Kong.

He died in Tasmania in 1876.

=== Descendants ===
Through his son Robert de Lancey Forth, Forth's great-great-grandson is Australian-American media mogul Rupert Murdoch, through Murdoch's mother, Elisabeth Joy Greene, a daughter of Marie Grace de Lancey Forth.

Government offices
New title	Council President of the Turks and Caicos Islands; 1848–1854	Succeeded by William Robert Inglis
Preceded by Robert Rienaecker	Treasurer for the Island of Hong Kong; 1857–1871	Succeeded by Cecil Clementi Smith
