= Fidalgo =

Portuguese nobility title

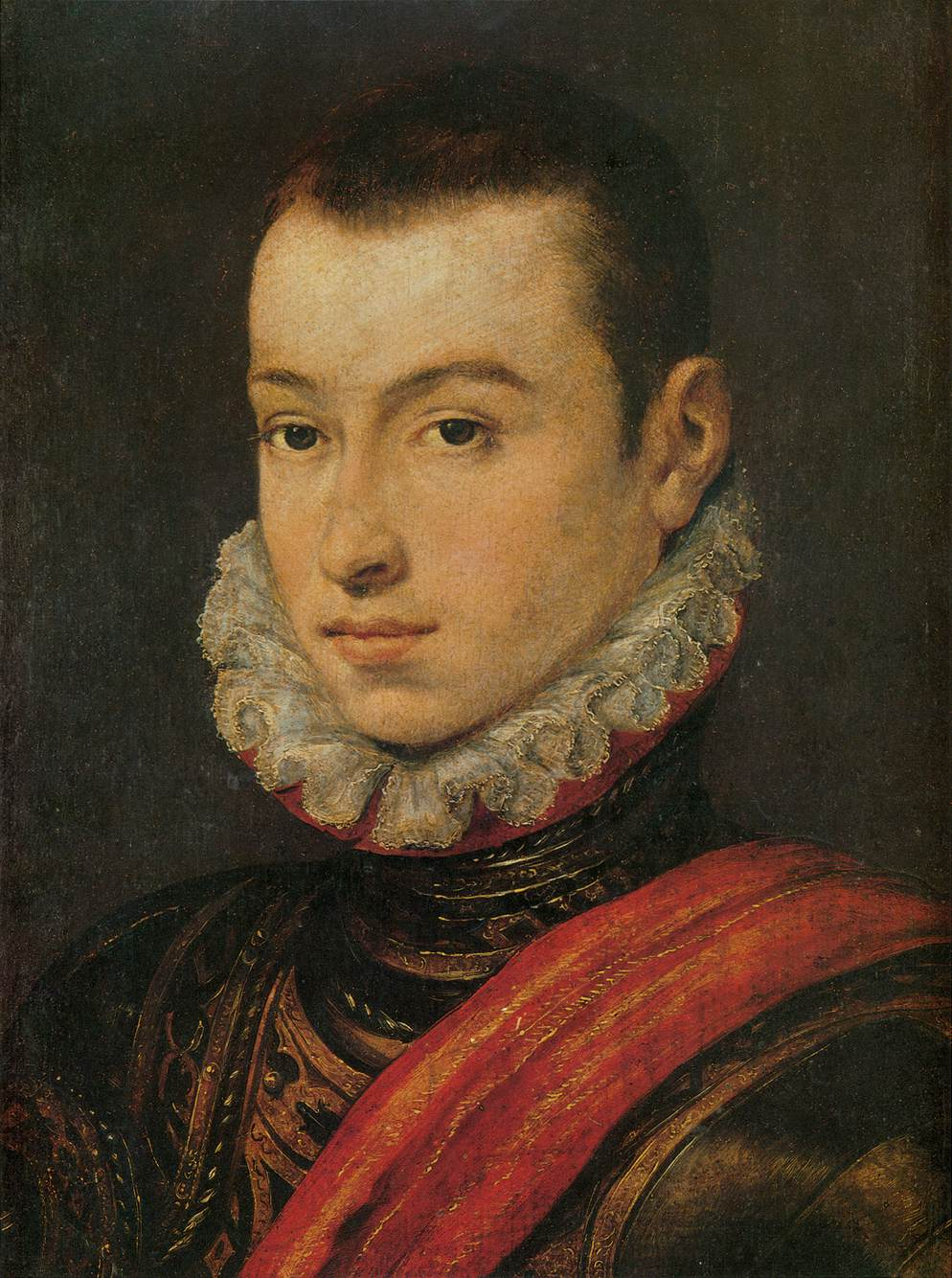
Portrait of a Young Fidalgo; a 16th-century rendition of a young Portuguese nobleman.

Fidalgo (Portuguese: [fiˈðalɣu], Galician: [fiˈðalɣʊ]), from Galician fillo de algo and Portuguese filho de algo—equivalent to a nobleman, but sometimes literally translated into English as "nobleman" —is a traditional title of Portuguese nobility and Brazilian nobility that refers to a member of the titled or untitled nobility. The title was abolished after the overthrow of the monarchy in 1910 by the republic and is also a family surname.

== Origins and etymology ==
The word has the same etymological and historical roots as its Spanish cognate, hidalgo. Although algo generally means "something", in this expression the word specifically denotes "riches" or "wealth" and thus was originally synonymous with rico homem (literally, "a rich man").

As late as the reign of Afonso III (1248–1279), who completed the reconquest of the Algarve, the nobility was not differentiated as it would be later. All nobles, who were the large landowners, were referred to simply by two synonyms, fidalgo and ricos homens. Originally, rico homem referred to the administrative duties entrusted to a noble and fidalgo referred to the inherited status of nobility (in an older parlance, "the nobility of blood"). Below the ricos homens was a descending category of their vassals: the infanções, the knights (cavaleiros), and the squires (escudeiros).

Rico homem and fidalgo reached their current meanings during the reign of John I (1385–1433). Large segments of the nobility did not side with John I in the crisis of 1383–1385 and the subsequent war with Castile; they lost their lands after the new king secured his claim to the throne and were replaced by a new nobility, elevated from previously non-noble families and modeled on the English system. Fidalgo came to be applied to a category analogous to the English "gentleman."

By the start of the fifteenth century, the term infanção fell out of use and "knight" came to mean all those below the ricos homens. Fidalgo began to be emphasized because, in its sense of someone who had inherited nobility, it differentiated the older knights from the growing bourgeoisie that continued to gain access to knighthood through accomplishments in the service of the state.

It was during the reign of King Manuel I that rules were established that define the use of the degrees of nobility (hereditary titles), and the use of heraldic arms, preventing abuses in the adoption of both and establishing the rights of the nobility. The nobles were subject to the king and were arranged in an order with three degrees:

- 1st grade: Fidalgo Cavaleiro
- 2nd grade: Fidalgo Escudeiro
- 3rd grade: Moço Fidalgo
- 4th grade: Fidalgo Capelão (for ecclesiastics)

All nobles were considered vassals of the King of Portugal.
