= John Frederick Dickson =

British colonial civil servant

Sir John Frederick Dickson KCMG
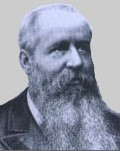

5th Colonial Secretary of Straits Settlements
- In office 17 November 1885 – 31 August 1891
- Monarch: Queen Victoria
- Governor: Sir Frederick Weld; Sir Cecil Clementi Smith
- Preceded by: Sir Cecil Clementi Smith
- Succeeded by: Arthur Philip Talbot (Acting); William Edward Maxwell

Personal details
- Born: 17 September 1835
- Died: 21 December 1891 (aged 56); Paddington, London
- Spouse: Emily Ayton Lee (Lady Dickson) (m. 1875–1891)
- Profession: Colonial Administrator

Sir John Frederick Dickson KCMG (17 September 1835 – 21 December 1891) was a British colonial administrator in Singapore. He was also President of the Straits Branch of the Royal Asiatic Society from 1886 to 1891. He translated and edited the Upasampadā-kammavācā and the Patimokkha.

== Education ==
Dickson graduated from Westminster School and then Christ Church, Oxford with B.A. in 1859 and M.A. in 1873.

== Career ==
Dickson entered the Ceylon Civil Service as a writer on 28 February 1859 and served in Ceylon until 1885, including a position as the Central Provincial Government Agent. He arrived in Singapore in 1885 to receive instruction on becoming the new Colonial Secretary in Singapore, which he served until 1891.

In 1885 Dickson formally took office in Singapore as Colonial Secretary in the Straits Settlements, as the successor to Cecil Clementi Smith, who resigned as Colonial Secretary to accept a promotion to Governor of the Straits Settlements and High Commissioner to Malaya. For three separate occasions in 1887, 1889 and 1890, he performed administrative duties for governors during their absence.

As Colonial Secretary, he instructed the Public Works Department to maintain the historical inscriptions, granite stones, and brick works in the cemetery on Government Hill.

== Death ==
Dickson died in 1891 in Paddington.

== Family ==
J. Frederick Dickson was twice married. He was married to his first wife from 1859 until her death in 1866. His second wife was Emily, Lady Dickson, née Emily Ayton Lee (christened on 2 September 1842, married in 1875 in Kensington and died on 10 October 1924).

== Honours ==
Dickson was made C.M.G. in 1883 and K.C.M.G. in 1888. The resort town of Port Dickson, Negeri Sembilan, Malaysia (locally known as PD) is named in his honour.
