= List of council presidents of the Turks and Caicos Islands =

The council president of the Turks of Caicos was the administrator of the Turks and Caicos from 1848 to 1874.

From 1492 to 1678 it was in possession by the Spanish (under the viceroy of New Spain) and by French occupation from 1764 to 1783, but there was no formal government established by either colonial powers.

The islands was settled by Bermudian British salt collectors in 1678, but they were not annexed until 1799. From 1799 to 1848 it was governed by the governor of the Bahamas and 1873 to 1959 with a local council president (1848–1874) and by the governor of Jamaica with local administration by commissioners (1874–1959). A formal governor was not added until 1959.

A list of council presidents:

- Frederick Henry Alexander Forth 1848–1854
- William Robert Inglis (1823–1888) 1854–1862
- Alexander Wilson Moir 1862–1869
- Alexander Augustus Melfort Campbell 1869–1873
