= Luís Gonçalves das Chagas, Baron of Candiota =

Brazilian landowner and military leader

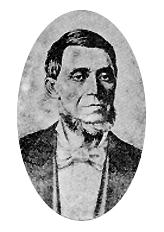
The Baron of Candiota, c. 1890

Luís Gonçalves das Chagas, Baron of Candiota (c. 1815–1894) was a Brazilian landowner, military leader and nobleman.

Born in Rio Grande do Sul, Brazil's southernmost state, Chagas was the owner of several estancias in the municipalities of Santa Maria, São Gabriel and Bagé. He fought the Ragamuffin War (1835–1845) on the Republican side.

In 1865, he raised a regiment to fight for Brazil in the Paraguayan War (1864–1870). On March 20, 1875, Chagas was created Baron of Candiota (the name of a creek in one of his properties) by Emperor Pedro II of Brazil.
