= Cecil Clementi Smith =

British colonial administrator

The Right Honourable Sir Cecil Clementi Smith GCMG PC
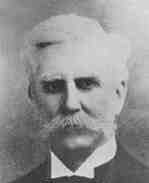

13th Governor of the Straits Settlements
- In office 17 October 1887 – 30 August 1893
- Preceded by: Sir Frederick Weld
- Succeeded by: William Edward Maxwell (acting); Sir Charles Mitchell

4th Colonial Secretary of Straits Settlements
- In office 3 September 1878 – 17 November 1885
- Monarch: Queen Victoria
- Governor: William C. F. Robinson; Edward Anson; Sir Frederick Weld
- Preceded by: Sir John Douglas
- Succeeded by: Sir John Frederick Dickson

Colonial Treasurer of Hong Kong
- In office 13 November 1874 – 29 April 1878
- Preceded by: Frederick Forth
- Succeeded by: Sir James Russell

Personal details
- Born: 23 December 1840 London, England, United Kingdom
- Died: 6 February 1916 (aged 75) Welwyn, Hertfordshire, England, United Kingdom
- Spouse: Teresa Alice Newcomen (m. 1869–1916)
- Children: Beatrice Smith (daughter); Eustace Smith (son)
- Parents: John Smith (father); Cecilia Susanna Clementi (mother)
- Relatives: Cecil Clementi (nephew)
- Education: Master of Arts
- Alma mater: St Paul's School; Corpus Christi College, Cambridge
- Occupation: Colonial Administrator

Sir Cecil Clementi Smith GCMG PC (23 December 1840 – 6 February 1916), was a British colonial administrator.

== Background ==
The son of an Essex rector, John Smith, and his wife Cecilia Susanna Clementi (daughter of Muzio Clementi), Cecil Clementi Smith received his education at St Paul's School and Corpus Christi College, Cambridge. In 1864, he began his civil service career as a cadet interpreter in Hong Kong, learning much about the Chinese culture and gradually becoming an accomplished scholar of the Chinese culture. He was also the Colonial Treasurer of Hong Kong.

== Civil Service ==
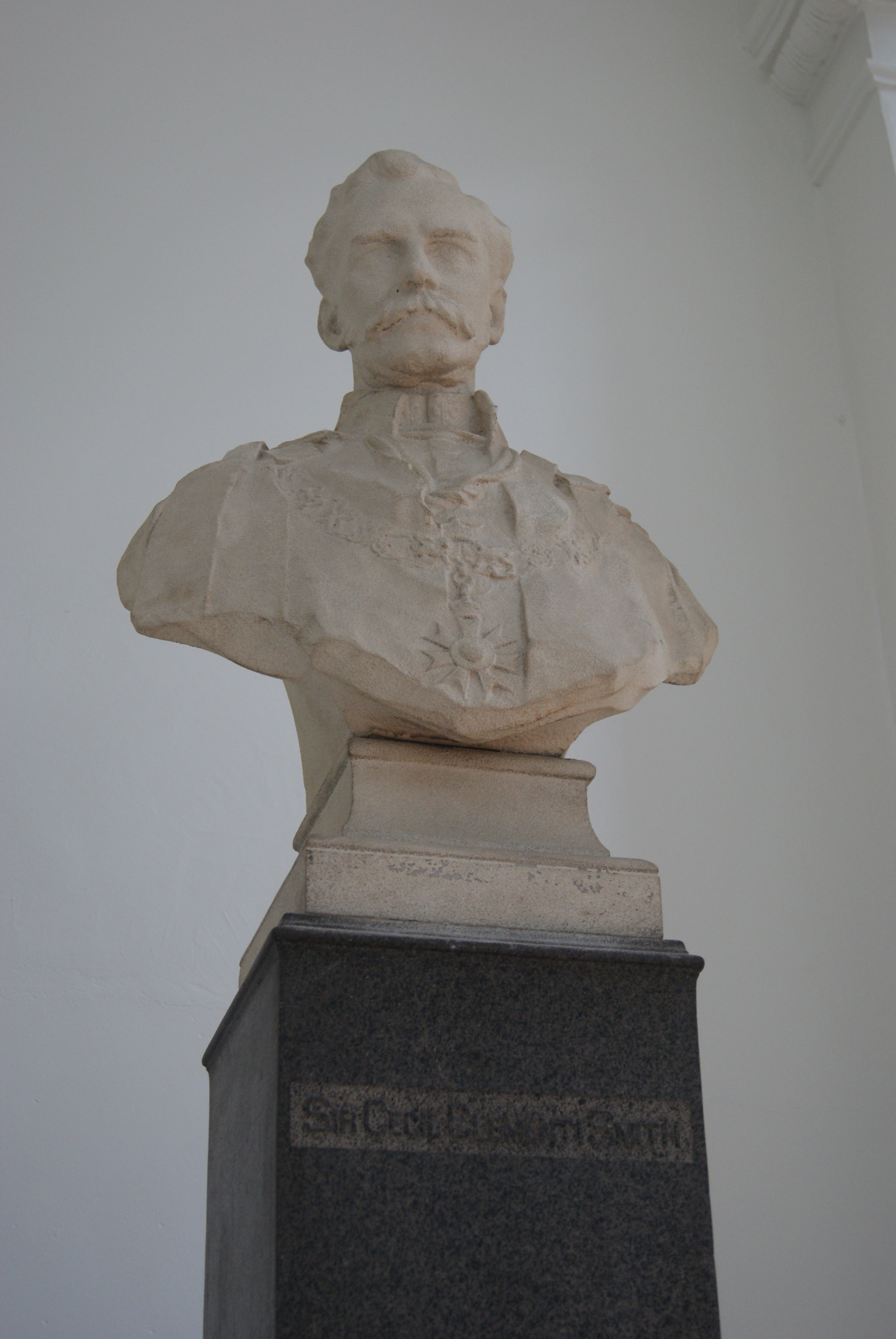
A bust of Clementi Smith in Victoria Concert Hall

On 3 September 1878, Clementi Smith took office in Singapore as a Colonial Secretary in the Straits Settlements, and understudied Governor Frederick Weld. His knowledge of Chinese culture and competence in the language proved useful as he was able to communicate effectively with leaders of the growing Chinese community.

Smith became known for his effective work in quelling Chinese secret societies in the Straits Settlements, such as those in Singapore which had been terrorising locals for decades. He also established the Queen's Scholarships in 1889 to fund bright Singaporean students to further their studies in top British universities.

In 1887, he was appointed Governor of the Straits Settlements and High Commissioner to Malaya till 1893. A popular governor, the local Chinese community petitioned for a continuation of his appointment when he left Singapore in 1893.

Subsequently, he was Lieutenant Governor of Ceylon, and the Master of the Mercers' Company in 1897. He was president of the commission of inquiry on the Trinidad riots in 1903, and was chief British delegate to the First International Opium Convention at The Hague in 1912.

== Family ==
Clementi Smith married Teresa Alice Newcomen; they had three sons and four daughters. Clementi Smith died in Welwyn, Hertfordshire, England, on 6 February 1916, aged 75. His nephew was Sir Cecil Clementi, who also served as Governor of the Straits Settlements and in other administrative positions in Hong Kong and Singapore.

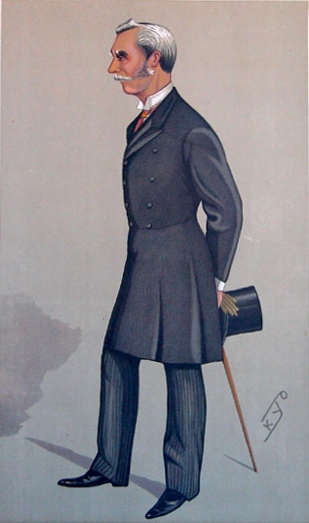
Clementi Smith as caricatured in Vanity Fair, January 1892

== Honours and awards ==
Clementi Smith was invested with Companion of the Order of St Michael and St George (CMG) in 1880, Knight Commander of the Order of St Michael and St George (KCMG) in 1886 and Knight Grand Cross of the Order of St Michael and St George (GCMG) in 1892.

He was also appointed as Privy Counsellor in 1906.

Government offices
Preceded by Frederick Forth	Colonial Treasurer of Hong Kong; 1874-1878	Succeeded by Sir James Russell
Preceded by Sir John Douglas	Colonial Secretary of Straits Settlements; 1878-1885	Succeeded by Sir John Frederick Dickson
Preceded by Sir Frederick Weld	Governor of the Straits Settlements; 1887–1893	Succeeded by William Edward Maxwell (acting); Sir Charles Mitchell
