= Imperial Order of the Cross =

Order of chivalry of the Empire of Brazil

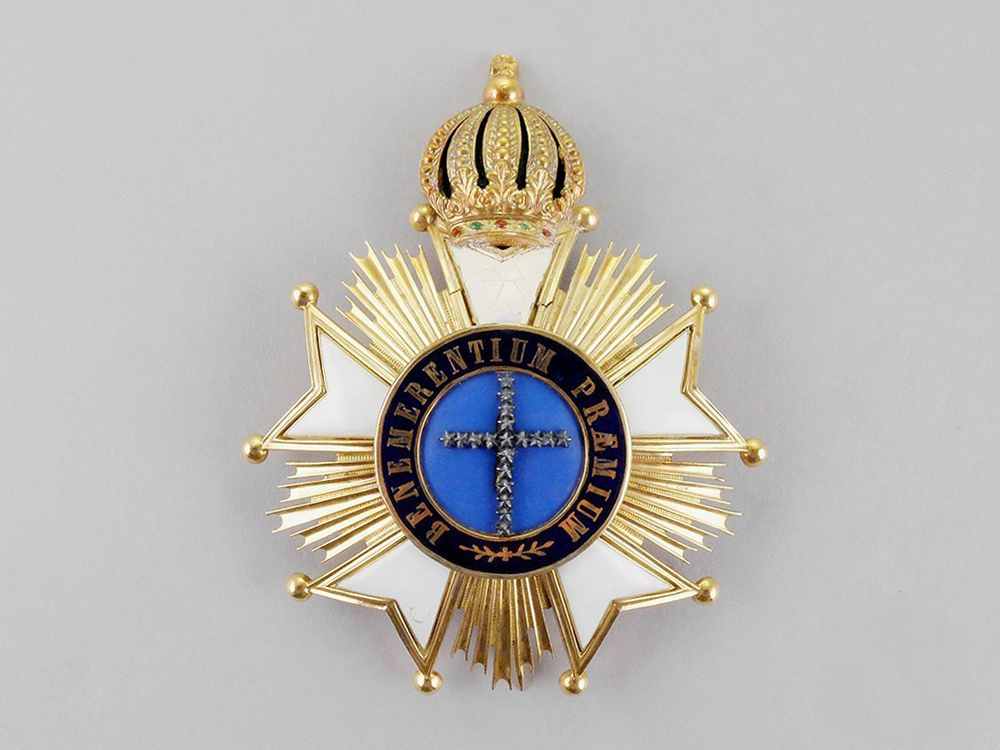
- The Imperial Order of the Cross

Awarded by the Emperor of Brazil
- Type: National Order and dynastic order
- Motto: Benemerentium Præmium
- Status: Superseded by the National Order of the Southern Cross
- Founder: Pedro I of Brazil
- Grand Master: The President of Brazil (the national order)
- Chancellor: The Minister of Foreign Affairs
- Grades: Grand Collar; Grand Cross; Grand Officer; Commander; Officer; Knight

Statistics
- First induction: December 1, 1822
- Ribbon bar of the National Order of the Southern Cross

The Imperial Order of the Cross (Portuguese: Ordem Imperial do Cruzeiro) was a Brazilian order of chivalry founded by Emperor Pedro I on 1 December 1822. The order aimed to commemorate the independence of Brazil (7 September 1822) and the coronation of Pedro I (1 December 1822). The name derives from the geographical position of the country, under the constellation of the Southern Cross and also in memory of the name – Terra de Santa Cruz (Land of the Holy Cross) – given to Brazil following its first arrival by Europeans in 1500.

== History ==
The Order was created by Emperor Pedro I on the day of his coronation, 1 December 1822. Also on the same date the first knights of the order were appointed, to commemorate the crowning of the Empire's first monarch. After the proclamation of the independence of Brazil on 7 September 1822 other honorific awards had been made, but of the Orders of chivalry shared with Portugal, Brazilian branches of which had been created upon independence; the Order of the Cross, created to mark the Coronation of the Empire's founder, was thus also the first purely Brazilian Order.

The Order of the Southern Cross was not the highest ranking of the Imperial Orders, as it ranked below the Brazilian branches of the ancient orders of chivalry, that originated with Portugal: the Order of Christ (the senior-most Order), the Order of Saint Benedict of Aviz and the Order of St. James of the Sword. Those Orders were shared by Brazil and Portugal; the Order of Christ was shared with the Holy See, similar to the Austrian and a Spanish Orders of the Golden Fleece. However, among the Brazilian created Orders, the Imperial Order of the Cross ranked first, having higher status than the Imperial Order of Pedro I and the Imperial Order of the Rose.

The Emperor of Brazil was ex officio the Grand Master of the Imperial Order of the Cross.

After the fall of the monarchy, Brazil's first republican Constitution, enacted on 24 February 1891, abolished all titles of nobility and all Imperial Orders and decorations.

On 5 December 1932, President Getúlio Vargas instituted the National Order of the Southern Cross.

The Grand Coat of Arms of the Empire of Brazil displayed the badge of the Imperial Order of the Cross suspended from a blue necklet.

Between the proclamation of the Brazilian Republic until 1932, no National Orders existed, and the Brazilian State bestowed only military medals. In 1932, the Order of the Southern Cross was the first Order to be created in the re-established, republican honours system. It is considered the senior Brazilian National Order.

== Criteria ==
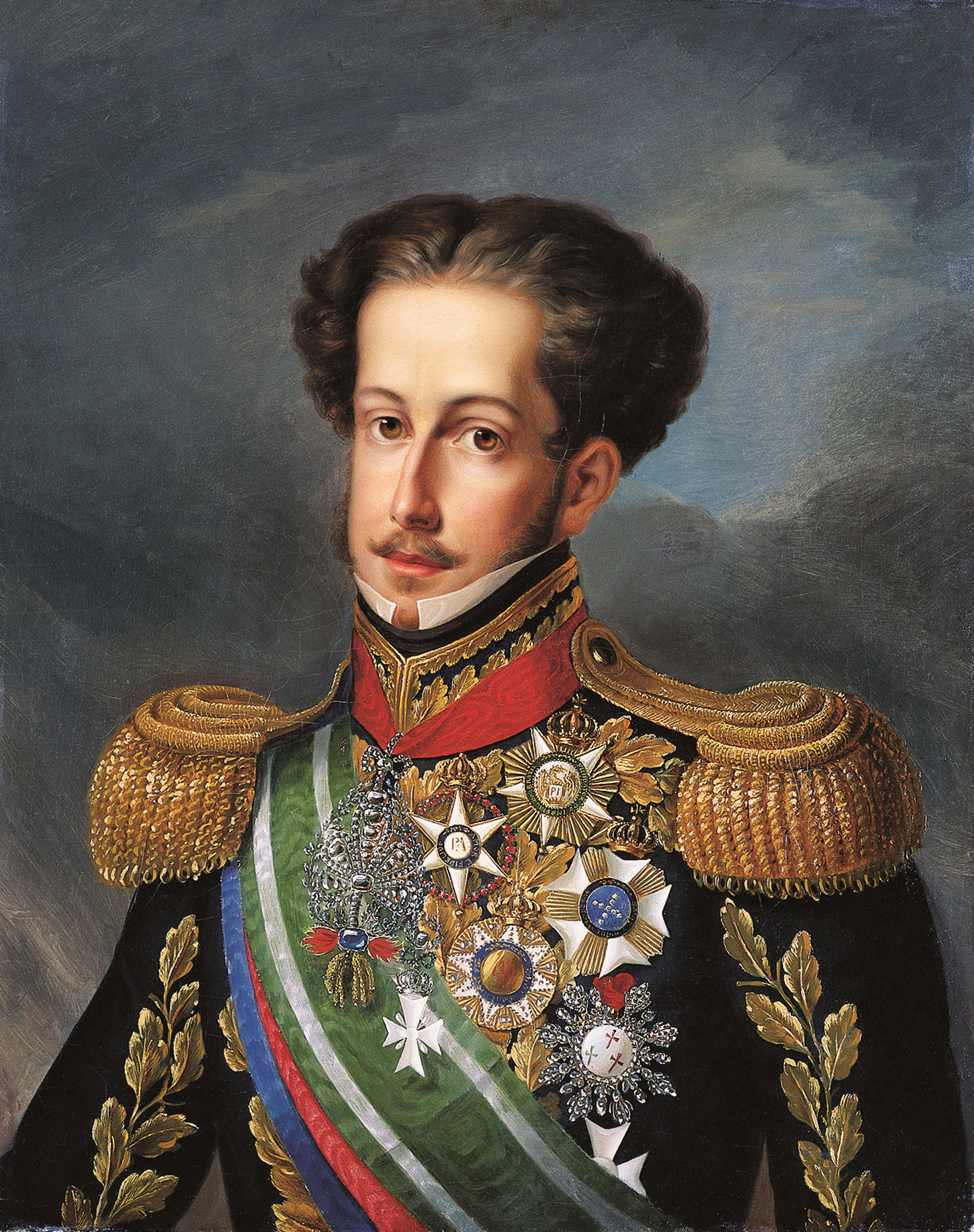
Pedro I, first Emperor of Brazil, founder and first Grand Master of the Order, wearing the Grand Cross of the Imperial Order of the Cross (then the Order's highest rank) among other orders.

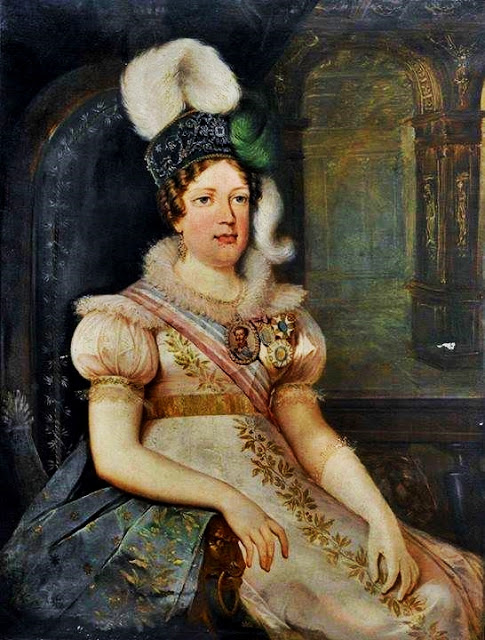
Archduchess Maria Leopoldina of Austria, Empress consort of Brazil, wears the insignia of the Imperial Order of the Cross and other orders.

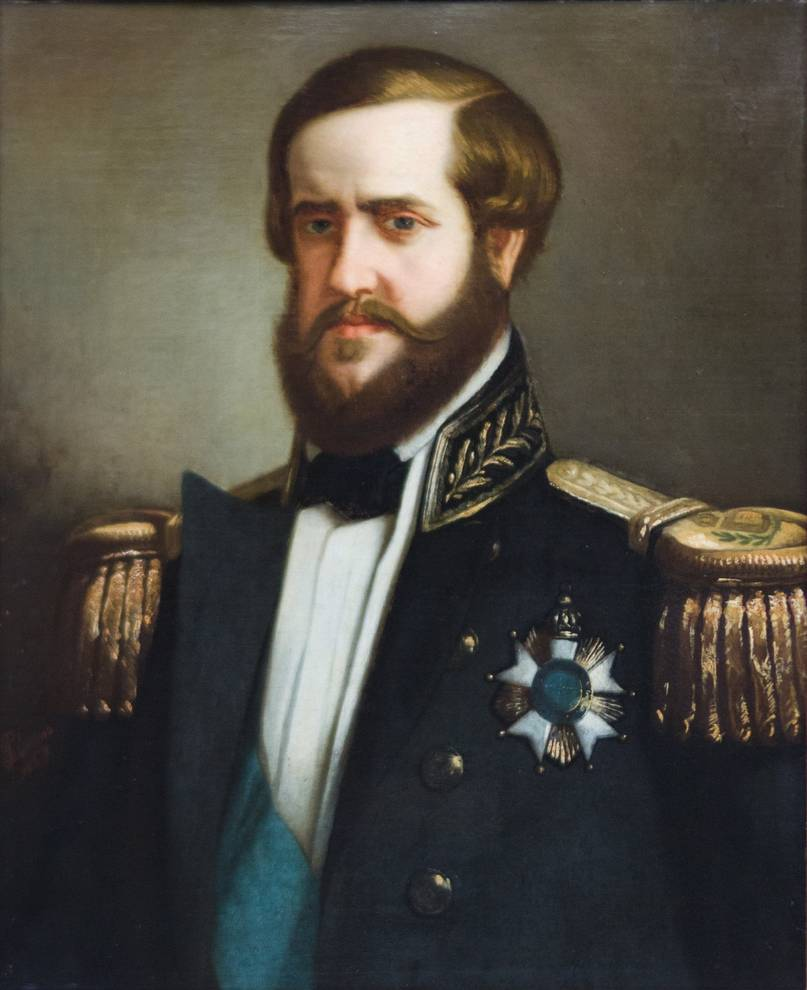
Emperor Pedro II of Brazil, Grand Master of the Order, wearing the Grand Cross of the Imperial Order of the Cross. The portrait displays both the star of the Order and the sash of a Knight Grand Cross.

Unlike the modern Order of the Southern Cross, which is only awarded to foreign nationals, the Imperial Order of the Cross was awarded to Brazilians and foreigners alike.

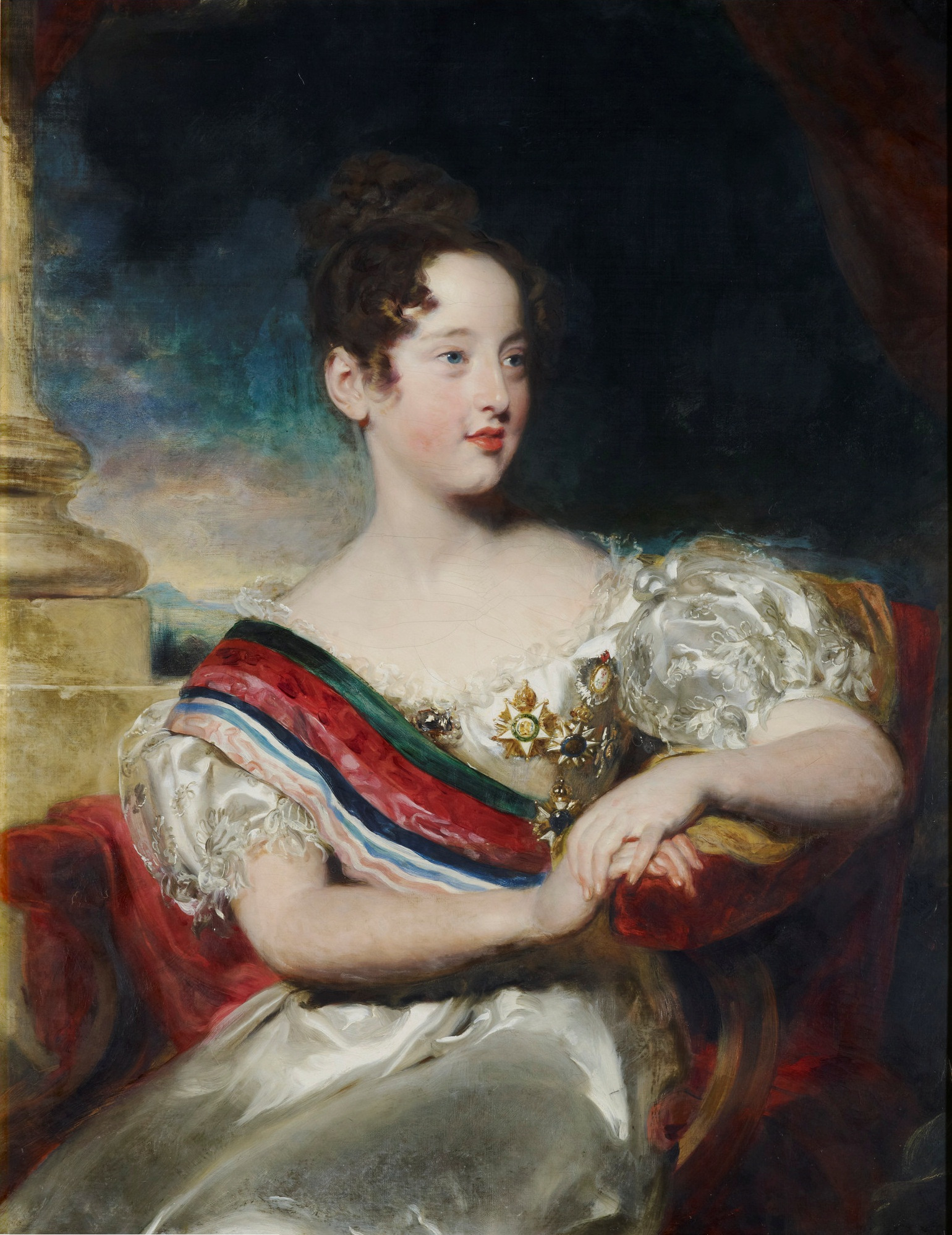
Queen Maria II of Portugal, eldest daughter of Pedro I of Brazil and sister of Pedro II, wearing the Grand Cross of the Imperial Order of the Cross and other orders.

== Notable recipients ==
- 1884 – (Russian Empire) Nicholas II (Emperor of Russia)
- 1878 – (German Empire) Wilhem II (German Emperor and King of Prussia)
- 1873 – (Kingdom of Portugal) Carlos I (King of Portugal and the Algarves)
- 1871 – Albert Edward, Prince of Wales, (later Edward VII, King of the United Kingdom and the British Dominions, Emperor of India)
- 1867 – (United Kingdom) Prince Alfred (Duke of Saxe-Coburg and Gotha)
- 1866 – (Russian Empire) Alexander III (Emperor of Russia)
- 1865 – (Second Mexican Empire) Maximilian I (Emperor of Mexico)
- 1864 – (France) Gaston, Count of Eu (French prince)
- 1861 – (Kingdom of Portugal) Luís I (King of Portugal and the Algarves)
- 1855 – (Kingdom of Portugal) Pedro V (King of Portugal and the Algarves)
- 1853 – (Second French Empire) Napoleon III (Emperor of the French)
- 1852 – Domingo Faustino Sarmiento (President of Argentina)
- 1848 – Isabella II (Queen of Spain)
- 1838 – (Kingdom of Portugal) Fernando II (King of Portugal and the Algarves)
- 1830 – (Austrian Empire) Francis II & I (Holy Roman Emperor and Emperor of Austria)
- 1830 – (Duchy of Parma) Marie Louise (Duchess of Parma, former Empress of the French)
- 1830 – (Kingdom of Portugal) Domingos Sequeira (artist)
- 1826 – (United Kingdom) John Pascoe Grenfell (admiral)
- 1826 – (Kingdom of Portugal) Maria II (Queen of Portugal and the Algarves)
- 1823 – (United Kingdom) Thomas Cochrane, 10th Earl of Dundonald (admiral)

among others

=== Brazilians ===
- 1888 – (Empire of Brazil) Afonso Celso, Viscount of Ouro Preto (Prime Minister of Brazil)
- 1876 – (Empire of Brazil) José Paranhos, Baron of Rio Branco (Diplomat)
- 1870 – (Empire of Brazil) José Paranhos, Viscount of Rio Branco (Prime Minister of Brazil)
- 1870 – (Empire of Brazil) Deodoro da Fonseca (Marshal)
- 1869 – (Empire of Brazil) Manuel Luís Osório, Marquis of Erval (Marshal)
- 1866 – (Empire of Brazil) Francisco Manuel Barroso, Baron of Amazonas (Admiral)
- 1866 – (Empire of Brazil) Émile Mallet, Baron of Itapevi (Marshal)
- 1852 – (Empire of Brazil) Manuel Marques de Sousa, Count of Porto Alegre (Lieutenant general)
- 1841 – (Empire of Brazil) Luís Alves de Lima e Silva, Duke of Caxias (Marshal)
- 1841 – (Empire of Brazil) Honório Hermeto Carneiro Leão, Marquis of Paraná (Prime Minister of Brazil)
- 1837 – (Empire of Brazil) Pedro de Araújo Lima, Marquis of Olinda (Regent of the Empire)
- 1824 – (Empire of Brazil) Carlos Frederico Lecor, Viscount of Laguna (Governor of the Cisplatina province)
- 1822 – (Empire of Brazil) Joaquim Xavier Curado, Count of São João das Duas Barras (minister of war)

among others
