= Polidoro Jordão, Viscount of Santa Teresa =

Viscount of Santa Teresa
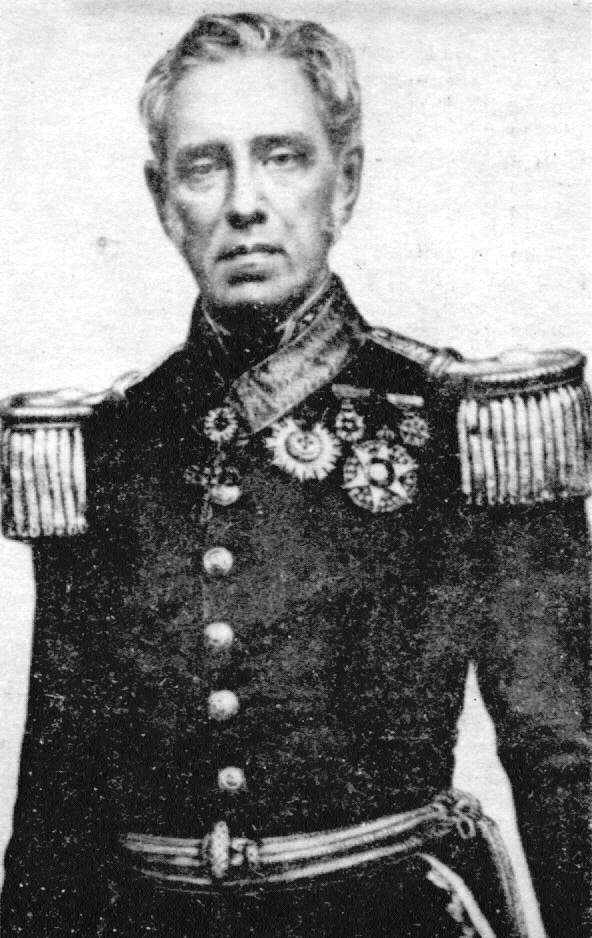
- The Viscount of Santa Teresa, c. 1868

Minister of War
- In office 30 May 1862 – 12 May 1863
- Monarch: Pedro II
- Prime Minister: Marquess of Olinda
- Preceded by: Count of Porto Alegre
- Succeeded by: Marquess of Abrantes

Personal details
- Born: 2 November 1802 Rio de Janeiro, State of Brazil
- Died: 13 January 1879 (aged 76) Rio de Janeiro, Empire of Brazil
- Resting place: São João Batista Cemetery
- Party: Conservative
- Education: Military Academy of Rio de Janeiro
- Occupation: Military officer; politician
- Awards: Order of Aviz; Order of the Rose; Order of the Cross

Military service
- Allegiance: Empire of Brazil
- Branch/service: Imperial Brazilian Army
- Years of service: 1824–1872
- Rank: Lieutenant-general
- Unit: 1st Brazilian Army Corps; 2nd Brazilian Army Corps
- Battles/wars: Paraguayan War

Polidoro da Fonseca Quintanilha Jordão, (Note: In the old spelling: Polydoro da Fonseca Quintanilha Jordão, Viscount of Santa Theresa.) the Viscount of Santa Teresa, (2 November 1802 – 13 January 1879) was a Brazilian general and politician who served as Minister of War of the Empire of Brazil and fought in the Paraguayan War.

== Biography ==
=== Early life ===
The son of colonel João Florêncio Jordão, Polidoro was born in Rio de Janeiro on 2 November 1802. After finishing the humanities course, he was accepted into the Military Academy of Rio de Janeiro on 20 January 1823, becoming a cadet on 7 February 1824. Polidoro rose through the military ranks, successively being promoted to second lieutenant via decree on 12 October 1824; first lieutenant on 17 February 1825; and captain on 10 March 1827. He graduated the engineering course at the Academy on 22 December 1831.

Polidoro was later promoted to major on 12 July 1837; lieutenant colonel on 3 August 1841 and colonel on 26 July 1851. On 15 November 1853 he was appointed Chief of Staff of the Superior Command of the National Guard of Brazil, being promoted to brigadier on 2 December 1856. With the formation of a new cabinet headed by prime minister Pedro de Araújo Lima, the marquess of Olinda, on 30 May 1862, Polidoro was appointed Minister of War. He exercised this office until 12 May 1863.

On 28 September 1862 he was appointed a justice in the Supreme Military Council, becoming Councillor of War in the council on 27 June 1867.

=== Paraguayan War ===
With the outbreak of the Paraguayan War, general Manuel Luís Osório, then Commander-in-Chief of the Brazilian Army in Paraguay, requested the appointment of a trusted officer who could replace him in the event of impediments. Polidoro was then appointed by the imperial government, not only for Osório's impediments, but also to replace the Viscount of Porto Alegre in command of the 2nd Army Corps. As soon as he arrived in Paraguay, with Osório's ailments increasing, Polidoro took command of the 1st Army Corps, beginning his work in the Battle of Curupayty, in which the Allied forces suffered a great defeat. Polidoro also commanded the 2nd Army Corps during the war.

=== Later years and death ===
Polidoro died in Rio de Janeiro on 13 January 1879 with the rank of lieutenant general; his remains were buried in the São João Batista Cemetery.

== Titles and honors ==
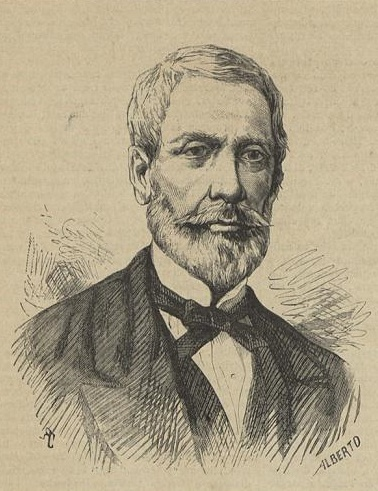
Polidoro in his old age

=== Titles of nobility ===
- Viscount of Santa Teresa on 27 April 1870;
- Viscount of Santa Teresa (with Grandee) on 24 March 1871.

=== Other titles ===
- Grandee of the Empire of Brazil.

=== Honors ===
- Grand Cross of the Brazilian Order of Aviz;
- Commander of the Order of the Rose;
- Dignitary of the Imperial Order of the Cross.

=== Military honors ===
- Medal awarded to the army, armada and to civil servants in operations in the Paraguayan War;
- Medal of Military Merit;
- Medal of Military Bravery.
