= Geraldo Augusto de Resende, Baron of Retiro =

Brazilian nobleman

Geraldo Augusto de Resende
- Baron of Retiro
- Born: 18 August 1835; Juiz de Fora, Minas Gerais, Empire of Brazil
- Died: 31 July 1914 (aged 78); Juiz de Fora, Minas Gerais, Brazil
- Spouse: Maria Carlota Mendes Tostes
- Father: José Ribeiro de Rezende, Baron of Juiz de Fora
- Mother: Senhorinha Carolina de Miranda Reis

Geraldo Augusto de Resende, first and only Baron of Retiro (18 August 1835 - 31 July 1914) was a Brazilian nobleman, councilor, Executive Agent (mayor) and President of the last City Council of Juiz de Fora in the Brazilian Empire.

== Biography ==
Son of José Ribeiro de Rezende, first and only Baron of Juiz de Fora and Senhora Carolina de Miranda Reis was married to Maria Carlota Mendes Tostes, they had 12 children, of which stands out Maria Luiza de Resende, married to Cândido Teixeira Tostes. He lived on the Retiro Station in Juiz de Fora, place where he has all his farms. He was awarded the title of Barão do Retiro, by decree of Emperor Dom Pedro II on August 11, 1889, he was a councilor several times for the district of Chácara, Minas Gerais, where he was an influential politician. The Baron was also one of the founders of the João Emilio Asylum.

== Tributes ==
A school group named after him, Escola Estadual Barão do Retiro, and was inaugurated in 1929, as a tribute from the Government of Antonio Carlos Ribeiro de Andrada, in the district of Chácara. Antonio Carlos' daughter, Ilka Maria, married Lahyr de Resende Tostes, the great-grandson of Barão de Retiro. He was also honored with the name of a neighborhood and street in Juiz de Fora, O Bairro Barão do Retiro and Street Barão do Retiro.
