= Joaquim Henrique de Araújo, Viscount of Pirassununga =

Coat of arms of the Viscount of Piraçununga

Joaquim Henrique de Araújo, 1st Viscount of Pirassununga (13 June 1821 – 14 October 1883), was a Brazilian nobleman.

== Early life ==
Araújo was born on 13 June 1821 in Rio de Janeiro, Brazil. He was the son of Henrique José de Araujo and Maria Bibiana Cordovil. He was the brother of Henrique José de Araujo and Maria José de Araújo (wife of José Pedro da Motta Sayão, Baron of Pilar). His father served in the Junta Administrativa de Caxia de Amortização from 1832 to 1840.

== Career ==
His father, Henrique José de Araújo, owned houses and land in the city of Rio de Janeiro and developed commercial activities, generating 'capital' and prestige that enabled him, and through a fortunate marriage with Maria Feliciana, daughter of the Carioca elite and descendant of families of conquerors and colonizers of Rio de Janeiro, the acquisition of large rural properties, mainly in the Macau valley, Rio de Janeiro, such as Fazenda da Papucaia or Fazenda do Colégio, previously owned by the Jesuits.

Joaquim inherited his father's farms and influence over the Macau valley, exemplified by his actions during the deadly cholera epidemic that violently hit the Province of Rio de Janeiro in 1855, including the Macacu region.

On 11 October 1876, he was created Viscount of Pirassununga (Visconde de Piraçununga).

== Personal life ==
He was married to Luiza Balbina de Araújo Lima (1829–1896), daughter of Pedro de Araújo Lima, Marquis of Olinda, and Luiza Bernarda de Figueiredo, and granddaughter of José Bernardo de Figueiredo. Together, they were the parents of:

- Joaquim Henrique de Araújo (1844–1910), who married Laura Clemente de Faro, a daughter of António Pereira de Faro.
- Luiza de Araújo (1845–1894), who married Antonio Alves Souto, son of António José Alves de Souto, 1st Viscount of Souto.
- Maria Bibiana de Araújo (1847–1940), who married to Domingos Custódio Guimarães Filho, 2nd Baron of Rio Preto. After his death in 1876, she married Mario de Lellis-Silva.
- Pedro de Araújo (1850–1863), who died young.
- Guilhermina de Araújo (1860–1862), who died young.

Pirassununga died in Rio de Janeiro on 14 October 1883.

=== Descendants ===
He was the grandfather of Julieta de Araújo Lima Guimarães, who married Brazilian politician Antônio Carlos Ribeiro de Andrada, president of the Chamber of Deputies of Brazil, Senator of the Republic, President of the National Constituent Assembly.

== Titles and honors ==
- Baron of Pirrasununga (6 December 1850)
- Viscount of Pirassununga (11 October 1876)
- Officer of the Imperial Order of the Rose
- Commander of the Imperial Order of Christ
- Commander of the Order of St. Sylvester
