= Baron of Rio Preto =

Nobility title of the Brazilian Empire

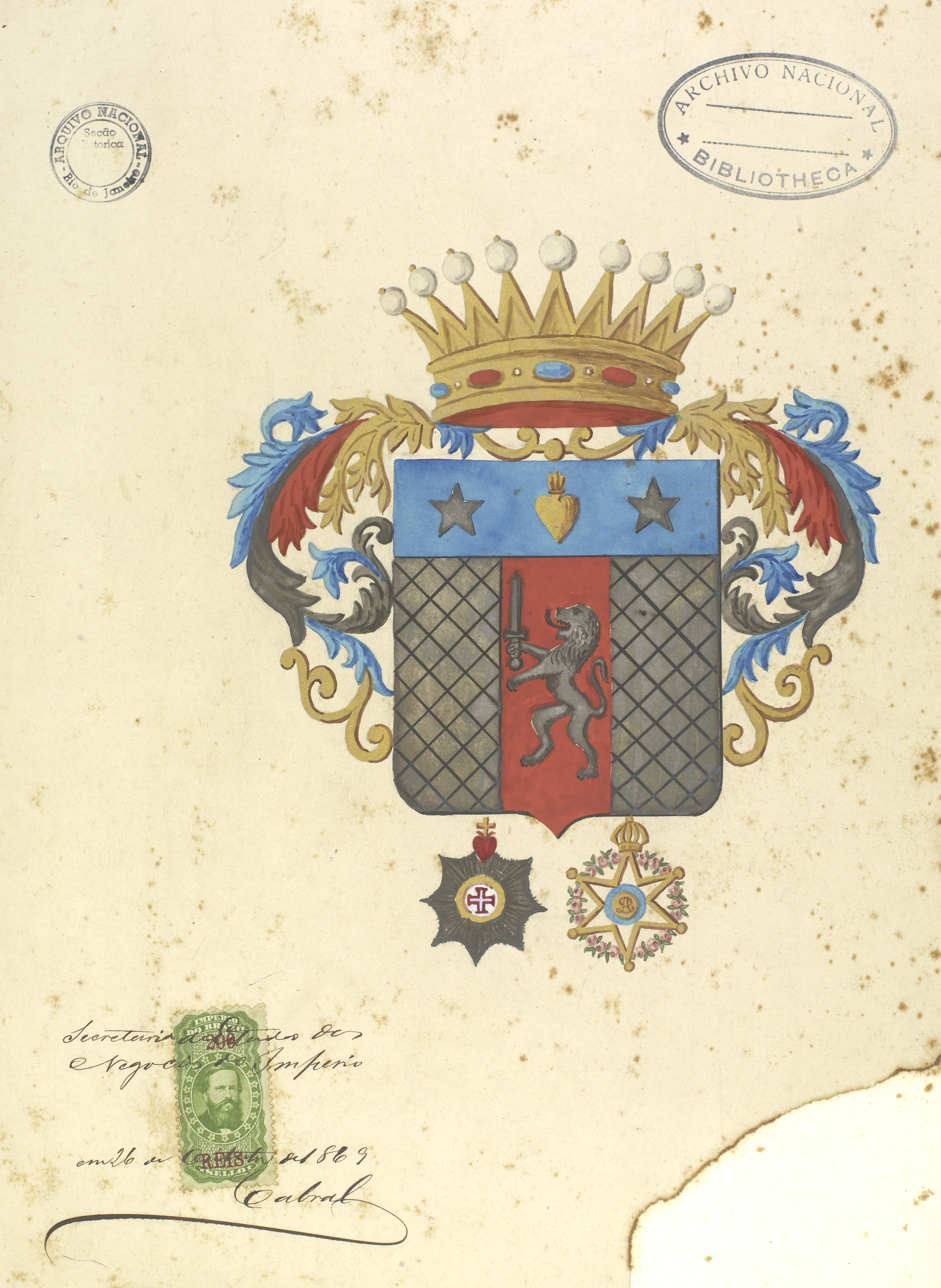
Coat of Arms of Domingos Custódio Guimarães, Baron and Viscount of Rio Preto

Baron of Rio Preto is a Brazilian noble title created by Emperor Pedro II of Brazil, by decree of December 6, 1854, in favor of Domingos Custódio Guimarães.

== Holders ==
1. Domingos Custódio Guimarães (1802–1868) – first viscount of Rio Preto;
2. Domingos Custódio Guimarães Filho (?–1876) – second baron of Rio Preto.
