= Marcos Antônio de Araújo, Viscount of Itajubá =

Brazilian lawyer, professor, nobleman and diplomat

Marcos Antônio de Araújo
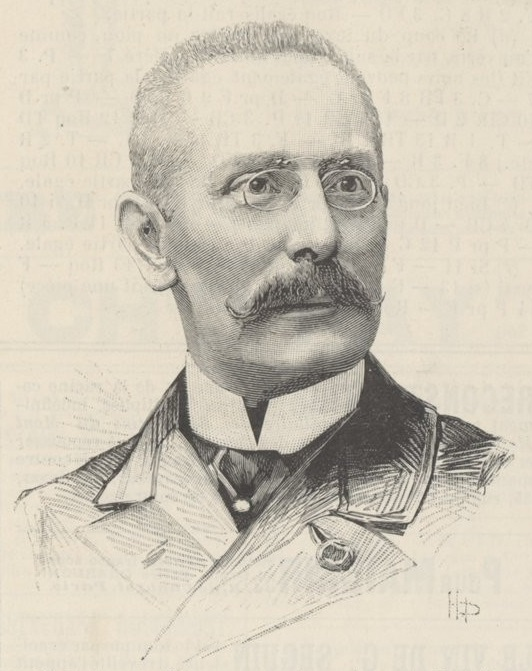
- Marcos Antônio de Araújo, Viscount of Itajubá
- Born: 25 April 1805; Diamantina, Minas Gerais, Brazil
- Died: 6 February 1884 (aged 78); Wiesbaden, German Empire
- Occupations: Lawyer, professor, diplomat
- Title: Baron and Viscount of Itajubá
- Spouse(s): Maria Cristina Josefina Adele Vaugbelle; Ida von Hildebrandt

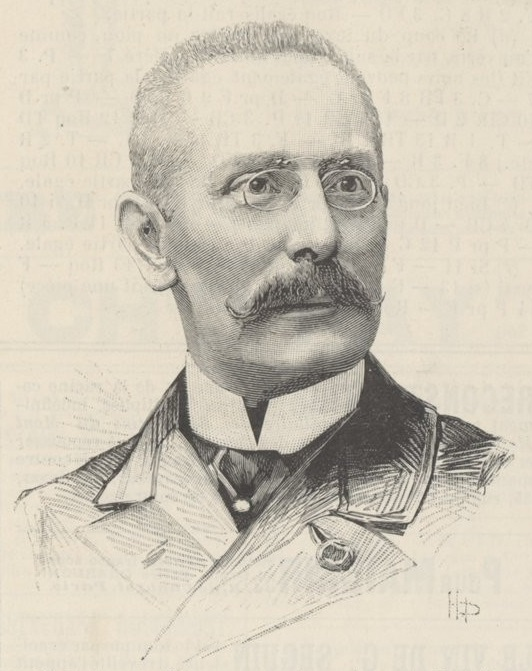

Marcos Antônio de Araújo, Baron and Viscount of Itajubá (Diamantina, April 25, 1805 — Wiesbaden, February 6, 1884) was a Brazilian lawyer, professor, nobleman and diplomat. He was a commander of the Imperial Order of Christ; a knight grand cross of the Order of the Red Eagle and the Order of the Dannebrog; a knight of the Order of the Immaculate Conception of Vila Viçosa and a member of His Imperial Majesty's Council (Emperor Dom Pedro II).

He married Maria Cristina Josefina Adele Vaugbelle. From his marriage with Maria Cristina he had three children, including Marcos Antônio de Araújo e Abreu, 2° Baron of Itajubá. His second wife was Ida von Hildebrandt.

He graduated from the Law School of Olinda, where he was a professor. He was called to the diplomatic career, being the Brazilian ambassador to the States of the German Confederation. He also served in other European countries.

He was given the title of Baron on June 6, 1867; and Viscount on July 17, 1871. Both titles were given by Emperor Dom Pedro II of Brazil.
