= Manuel Luís Osório, Marquis of Erval =

Brazilian military officer

Marquis of Erval
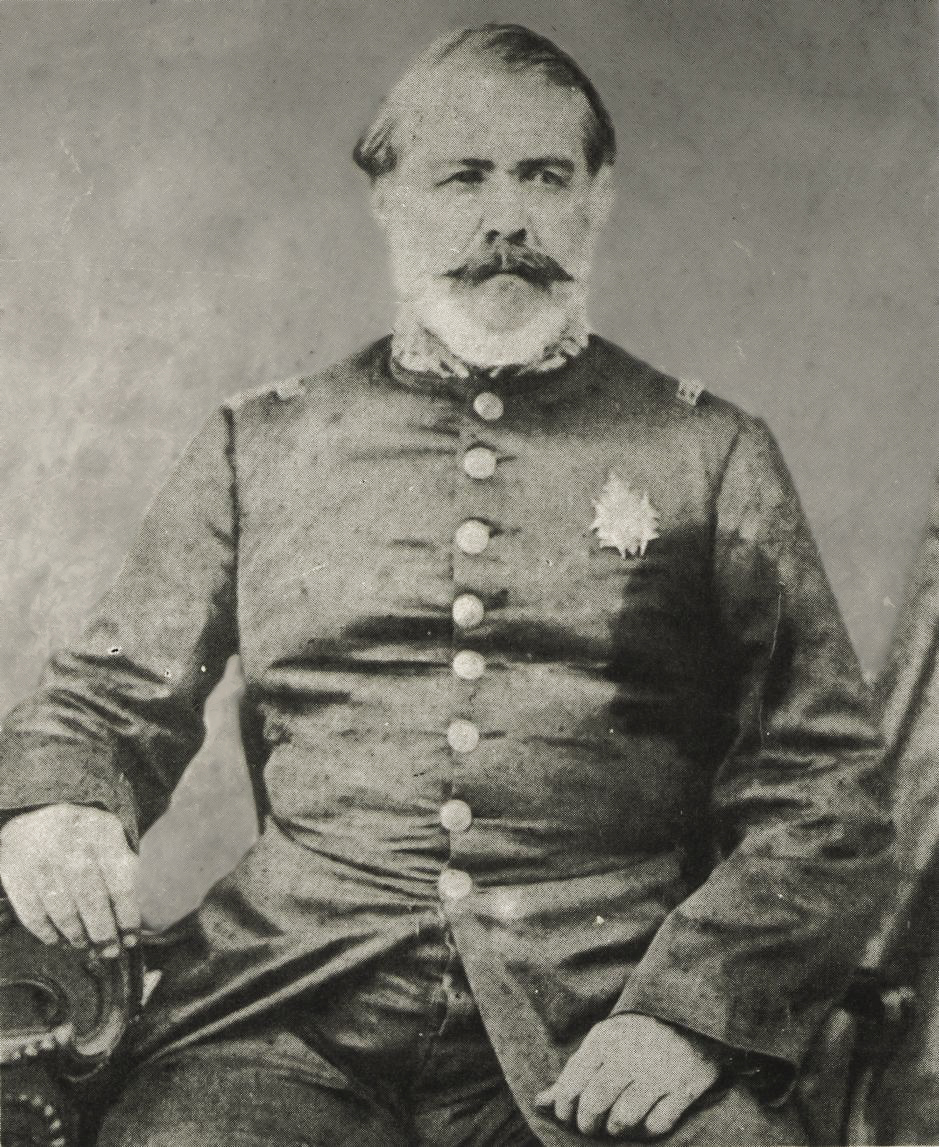
- The Marquis of Erval around age 60
- Born: 10 May 1808; Conceição do Arroio, State of Brazil
- Died: 4 October 1879 (aged 71); Rio de Janeiro, Empire of Brazil
- Spouse: Francisca Fagundes
- Children: Fernando Luís Osório; Adolfo Luís Osório; Manuela Luísa Osório; Francisco Luís Osório
- Military career
- Allegiance: Empire of Brazil
- Branch: Imperial Brazilian Army
- Service years: 1824–1876
- Nickname: "the Legendary"
- Commands: Army of the Triple Alliance
- Conflicts: Brazilian War of Independence; Cisplatine War; Ragamuffin War; Platine War; Paraguayan War
- Other work: Minister of War
- Coat of Arms of the Marquis of Herval

Signature
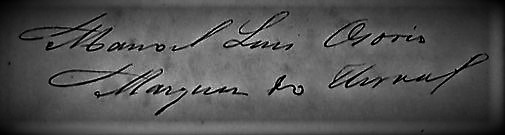

Manuel Luís Osório, Marquis of Erval (10 May 1808 – 4 October 1879) was a Brazilian military officer, monarchist and politician. A member of the Imperial Army at the age of fifteen, he climbed all the posts of the military hierarchy of his time thanks to the soldier attributes that consecrated him as "the Legendary". He participated in the main military events of the late nineteenth century in the Río de la Plata region and is considered a hero of the Paraguayan War. He was declared patron of the Cavalry Branch of the Brazilian Army in 1962.

== Biography ==
=== Early life ===
Manuel Luís Osório was born on 10 May 1808, in lands that belonged to the village of Nossa Senhora da Conceição do Arroio (Rio Grande do Sul). Osório was raised on his maternal grandfather's farm. His father, Manuel Luís da Silva Borges, son of the Azorean descendant couple Pedro Luís and Maria Rosa da Silveira, both native of the parish of Nossa Senhora da Conceição da Lagoa, on the island of Santa Catarina, was a distinguished and decorated military man, in the army of Dom Diogo de Sousa, captain-general of the Rio Grande, to fight in the Banda Oriental (present Uruguay) in the wars of 1811 for the control of the Río de la Plata, having also fought in the period of 1816 to 1821. His mother, Ana Joaquina Luísa Osório, daughter of lieutenant Tomás José Luis Osório and Rosa Inacia Joaquina Pereira de Sousa, was a native of Santo Antônio da Patrulha and came from a family of landowners. The lands of his parents were located near Lagoa dos Barros, where the Marechal Osório Park is today.

On 15 October 1835, he married Mrs. Francisca Fagundes, having as godfather Emilio Mallet, who would later fight alongside him in the Paraguayan War. He had four children: Fernando Luís Osório (1848–1896), Adolfo Luís Osório (1847-?), Manuela Luísa Osório (1851–1930) and Francisco Luis Osório (1854–1910).

=== Early career ===
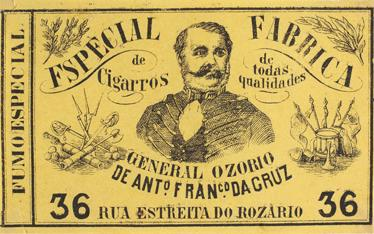
Lithograph by Osório on cigarette label.

The fourth son of a humble family of 14 children, Osório learned to read and write without regular studies. On 1 May 1823, at the age of fifteen incomplete years, he enlisted as a volunteer in the Cavalry of the Legion of São Paulo, currently the 5th Mechanized Cavalry Regiment, and accompanied his father's regiment in the fight against the Portuguese troops of Brigadier Álvaro Da Costa, stationed in the Cisplatina province (present-day Uruguay), during the Brazilian War of Independence (1822–1825). He was only 15 years old when he had his baptism of fire on the banks of the Miguelete stream (May 13), near Montevideo, in a battle against Portuguese cavalry. A year later, he was appointed cadet and, later, second lieutenant of the 3rd Regiment of Cavalry of the first line.

In 1824, he enrolled in the Military School. He was preparing to pursue military studies when his registration was canceled because of the imminent war in the south of the country. He had to face a new campaign in the Cisplatine War between 1825 and 1828. On 12 October 1825, near the Sarandí stream, under the command of Bento Manuel Ribeiro, Osório fought the orientals who were under the command of Juan Antonio Lavalleja to the forehead of his spearmen and stood out, not only because he was the only officer in his squadron to survive the Battle of Sarandí but also for saving the life of his commander, who said: "I will give you my spear, ensign, for it will take you where I have taken you".

At the beginning of 1827, Osório continued campaigning in the region of Santana do Livramento. On 20 February 1827, at the Battle of Ituzaingó, his lancers were the only Brazilian troops that were not disrupted during the battle. In October he was promoted to lieutenant and participated in the peace talks with the detachment of Cisplatina and recognition of Uruguay's independence, following general Lecor. When peace was established, he retired with his regiment to Rio Pardo, where he moved in, consecrating himself to politics by the Liberal Party.

=== Ragamuffin and Platine Wars ===
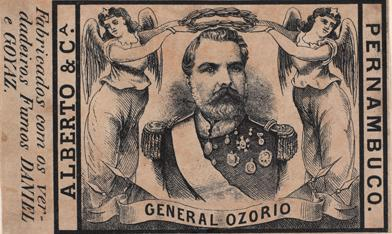
A cigarette label featuring a lithograph of General Osorio, who fought throughout the war in the South region.

In 1835 the Ragamuffin War broke out in the province of Rio Grande do Sul, characterized by a separatist agitation which, for ten years, threatened the unity of the Empire. At that time, lieutenant Osório was part of the 2nd Light Cavalry Corps, in the then Village of Bagé under the command of Captain Mazzaredo, who left the command and handed it to the rebels. Osório led his superior to the border and then presented himself to colonel Bento Manuel Ribeiro.

Liberal-minded, Osório had sympathy for the farroupilha (raggamuffin) cause, initially fighting alongside the rebels, until the proclamation of the Riograndense Republic in 1836, when the movement took a separatist orientation, which he did not accept. He then joined the Imperial Brazilian Army, in which he remained until the end of the revolt. He also participated in the fighting against the rebels in Porto Alegre, Caçapava and Erval. He became captain in 1838 and major in 1842. In 1844 he applied for his retirement, but the Army did not want to dismiss him, nominating him lieutenant colonel and commander of the 2nd Line Cavalry Regiment. He aided Caxias in the Poncho Verde Treaty, which was sealed on 25 February 1845. After the Raggamuffin War, the Emperor Pedro II, still very young, had decided to visit the province with the purpose of consolidating the signed peace. Caxias entrusted to Osório the delicate mission: "The 2nd Regiment, reorganized and trained by Osório himself, escorting the Emperor through the campaign, from Vila de Cachoeira to São Gabriel, on the way to and from the". He was elected provincial deputy in the 2nd Legislature of the Provincial Legislative Assembly of Rio Grande do Sul.

In 1851, as a lieutenant colonel, Osório was sent once again to Montevideo due to new instability in the region of the Río de la Plata, intervening with his regiment against the Argentine president Juan Manuel de Rosas and Uruguayan Manuel Oribe. He distinguished himself in the Battle of Monte Caseros, which occurred in the suburbs of Buenos Aires on 3 February 1852, when, at the head of the 2nd Cavalry Regiment, in the vanguard of the Brazilian troops, he inflicted on the Argentine dictator the rupture of his defense device and Commands decisive operations to take advantage of success and persecution. Promoted to colonel on the battlefield, by merit, on 3 March 1852, he served for a few years in Rio Grande do Sul.

At the beginning of 1855, after a brief installation in the garrison of the Jaguarão, Osório was appointed to command the border of São Borja. Promoted to brigadier-graduated in December 1856, soon after was commissioned to organize an expedition to discover rich herbs, between the rivers Pindaí and Sebolati, in the Upper Uruguay. Successful in the mission, he later received the nobiliarchic title: Marquis of Herval. Later, he was appointed cavalry inspector of the North of Brazil, where he remained for a short time.

He participated, in charge of a division of the army commanded by Marshal João Propício Mena Barreto, of a new intervention in Uruguay to help the colorados of Venancio Flores, allies of Brazil, to assume the power in the Eastern State. The invasion of Uruguay served as a reason for the Paraguayan military intervention in the politics of the river plate.

=== War of the Triple Alliance ===
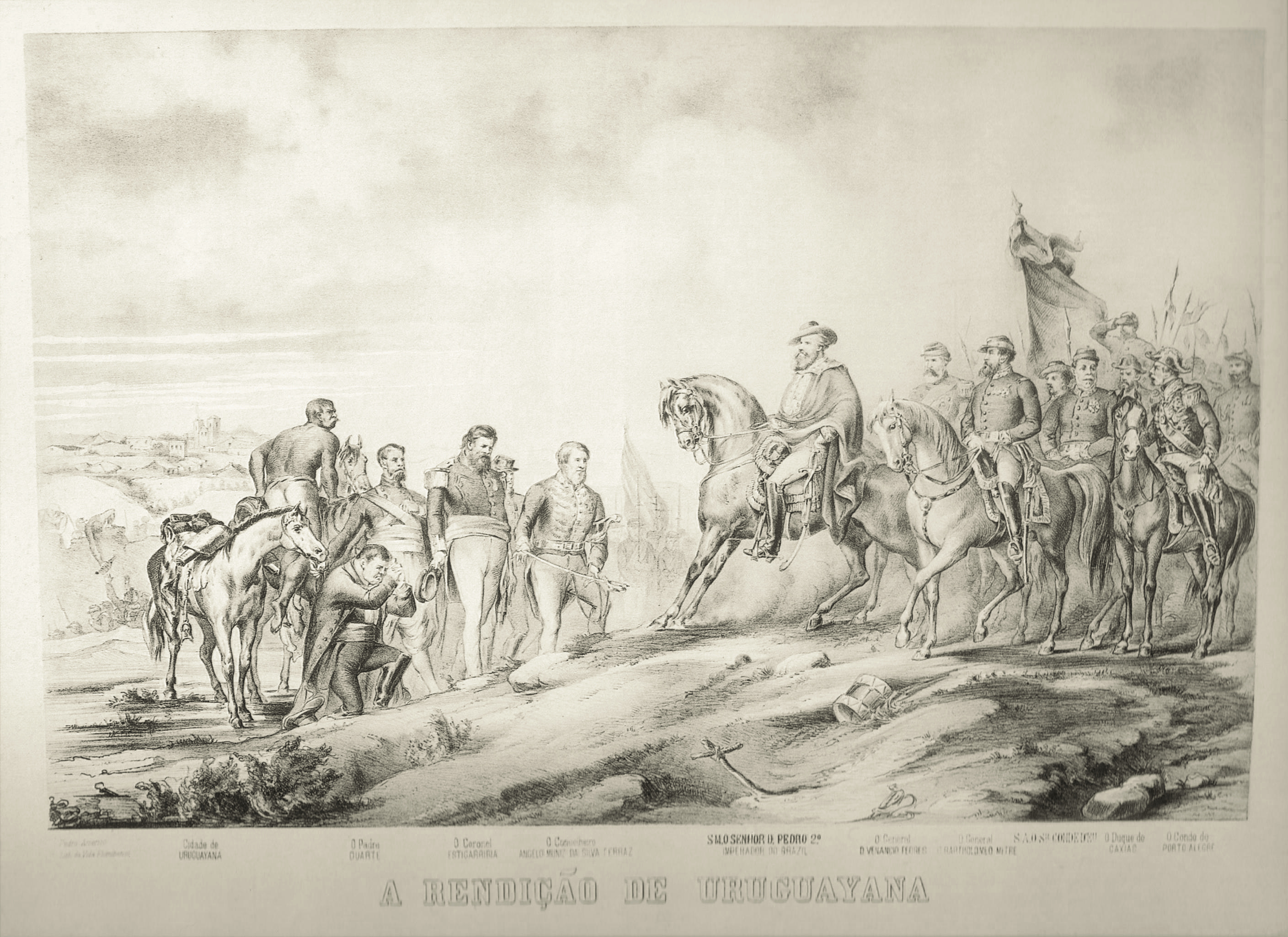
The surrender of Uruguaiana, by Victor Meirelles

The aggressions of Solano López to Brazil and Argentina motivated, in 1865, the signing of the Treaty of the Triple Alliance between Brazil, Uruguay and Argentina against Paraguay. At the outbreak of the Paraguayan War (1864–1870), Osório was the most prestigious military man in the platine region, having acted uninterruptedly for 42 years in successive campaigns. On 1 March 1865, he received command of the 1st Corps of the Imperial Army, setting up his headquarters in the Uruguayan town of Paysandú. Under the agreement of the Triple Alliance, however, the general command of the operations was handed over to the Argentine general and president Bartolomé Mitre, whom Osório did not always trust.

On 8 July 1865, he was promoted to Field Marshal and participated in the Siege of Uruguaiana. On 18 September, in the presence of Emperor Pedro II, the Count of Eu and several general officers, including Osório and Caxias, the Paraguayans surrendered after months of siege.

On 2 May 1866, he participated in the Battle of Estero Bellaco, a depression of terrain by which the waters of the Paraná River join the waters of the Paraguay River, where the Paraguayans began to delay the allied troops, seeking a better position to fight. On 24 May 1866, he was present at the Battle of Tuyutí, the largest battle in South American history, in which he played an important role in commanding the center of the Brazilian forces against the Paraguayan attack. He recorded on the Report of Day 56: "Glory is the most precious reward of the brave."

On 15 July 1866, still in Tuyutí, the allies awaited the arrival of the forces of General Count of Porto Alegre, while the enemy whipped daily. Seriously wounded in the battle and dissatisfied with the long period of the troops' recovering that ensued, Osório handed the command of the Brazilian troops to General Polidoro da Fonseca Quintanilha Jordão.

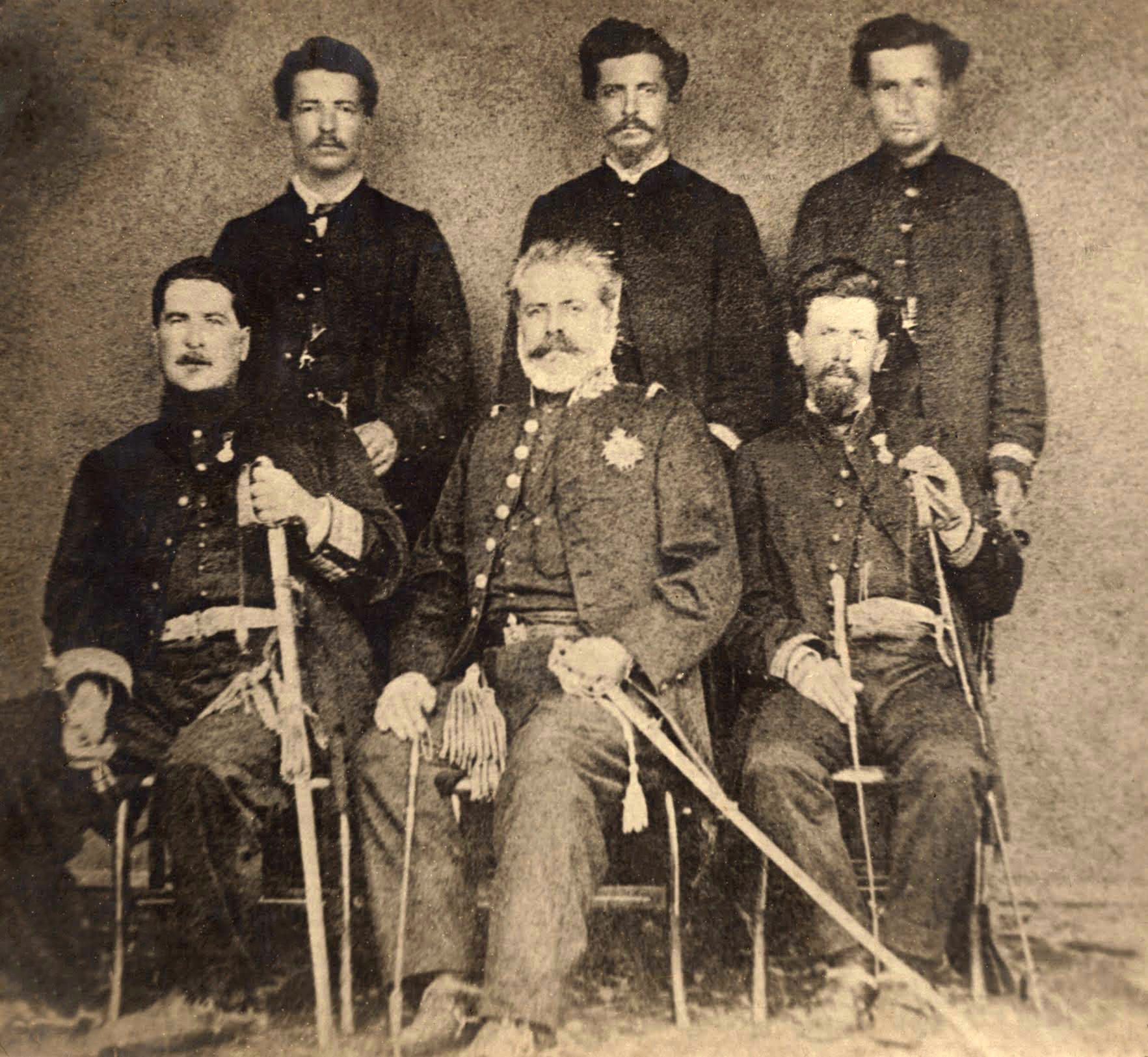
Osório (in the center), c. 1865.

From July of that year to July of the following year, he stayed in Rio Grande do Sul, gathering new contingents of soldiers for the Army. On 1 June 1867, he was promoted to Lieutenant General, second to last in the military hierarchy. On 25 July, Osório returned to the Allied vanguard, as commander of the 3rd Corps of the Imperial Army. At that time, the Field Marshal Luís Alves de Lima e Silva, then Marquis de Caxias, was the commander of the Brazilian forces in the theater of war. The relationship between them had always been good and cordial since they were longtime friends. Osório also took part in the planning of operations against the Fortress of Humaitá, which blocked the advance of allied forces towards Asunción. In command of his troops, Osório directed the march from Tuyutí to Tuiu-Cuê, advancing against the trenches and strongholds that surrounded Humaitá and protected it against enemy attacks. On 25 July Osório occupied the Fortress of Humaitá and replaced the abandoned Paraguayan flag with the Brazilian flag, installing there the headquarters of the 3rd Army Corps and its new base of operations.

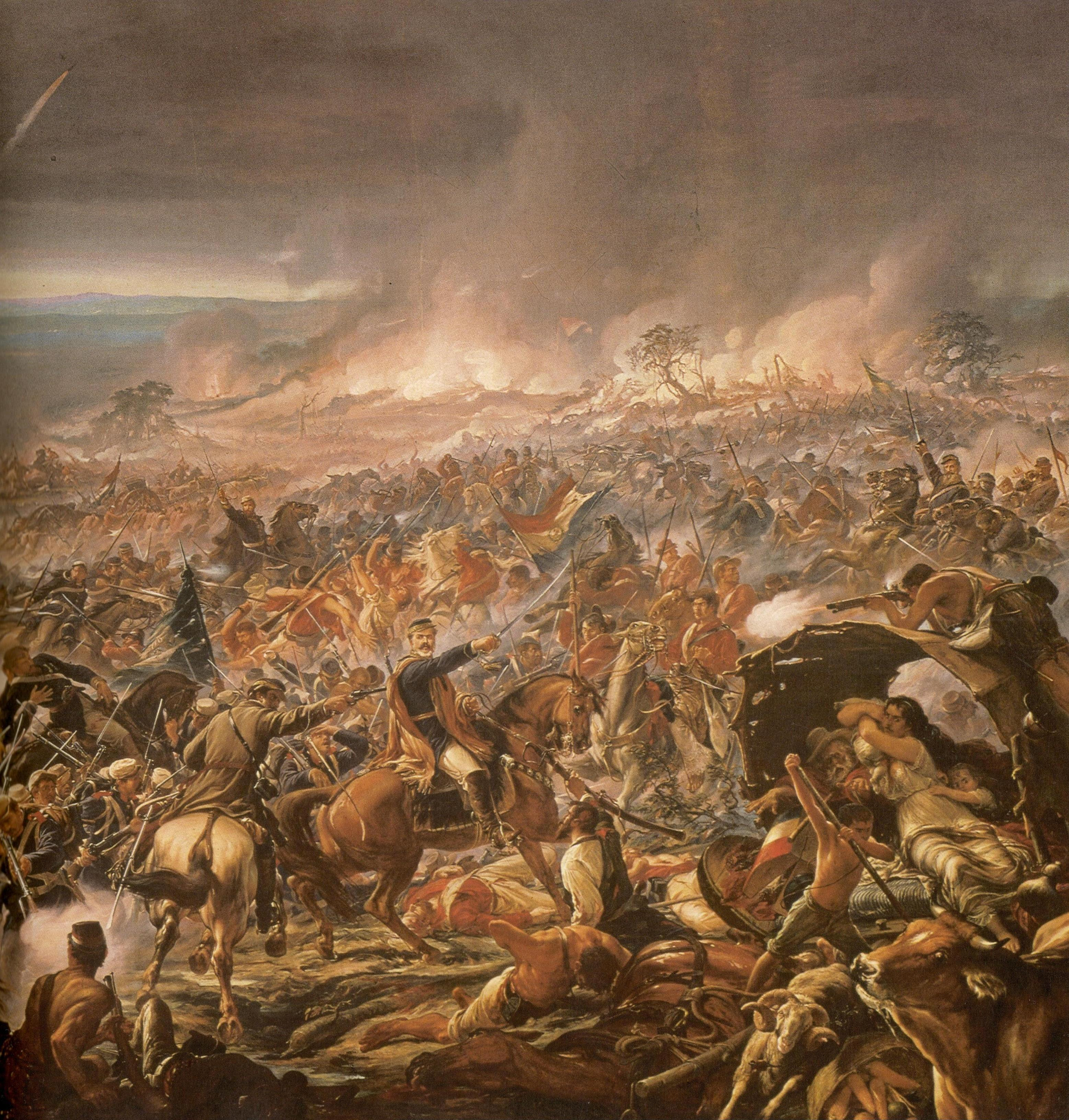
Manuel Luís Osório at the Battle of Avay

With the return of the war of movement after the fall of Humaitá, Osório also participated in the Battle of Ytororó and Battle of Avay in December 1868. In the latter, when taking all the positions of enemy artillery, he was shot in the face by an enemy of stunner, breaking the lower left of his jaw, a wound he hid with a poncho, continuing to encourage his men to fight, until the hemorrhage forced him to stop. At the time, he said: "Courage, comrades! Stop the rest!".

In order for his soldiers to assume he was still in command and not to be discouraged, his empty carriage was kept at the head of the troops. Osório was replaced by General Polidoro da Fonseca and returned to Brazil to recover from his wound, he did not witness the fall of Asunción in January 1869. On his coat of arms there are three golden stars representing the wounds suffered on his face during the bloody Battle of Avay.

On 22 March 1868, Gaston of Orléans, Count of Eu, son-in-law of the Emperor Pedro II, was appointed Commander-in-Chief of the forces in operation in Paraguay. At the invitation of the new commander of the Brazilian forces, Osório, who had been seriously wounded in the combat of Avaí and retired to Rio Grande do Sul, returned to Paraguay, assuming, on June 6, the 1st Army Corps, stationed in Piraju, to start the Mountain Campaign. The Count of Eu, one of his great admirers, would become Osório's ally in the incessant battles for the modernization of the Brazilian Armed Forces throughout the 1870s.

On 12 August, there was the assault and capture of the Peribebuí Fortifications, defended by 1,500 men and 15 fire hydrants. On 24 November 1868, Osorio leaves the campaign definitively, forced by the worsening of his health. On his return, on his way to Montevideo, he receives news of the death of his wife.

=== Later life ===
Osório was awarded the title of baron in May 1866 and viscount with greatness in 1868. The following year, before the end of the war, he received the title of Marquess of Herval. In August 1871, Deodoro da Fonseca solemnly presented to Porto Alegre a costly sword of honour, a masterpiece of goldsmithing, carved in gold and adorned with diamonds, paid for by the officers commanded by Osório during the war. On the steel blade were recorded the battles in which Osório had participated.

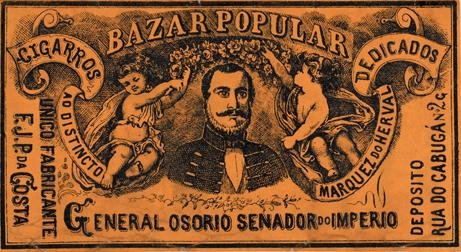
Cigarette label dedicated to the Marquis of Herval.

After the war, in the first four decades that followed, the victory in the Battle of Tuyutí, considered the most important in the campaign, was the main Brazilian military celebration, and in the commemorations, the main hero was Osório. Only in the decade of 1920 the military movement rescued the figure of the Duke of Caxias as leader of the Paraguayan War. Although an influential military officer and politician, he lived the 1870s, the last decade of his life, under the pressure of debts.

With the end of the war, Isabel, Princess Imperial of Brazil, then regent, made Osório a Senator of the Empire for the province of Rio Grande do Sul, his native land, on 11 January 1877, in a speech in the Senate, he stated: "The military uniform does not smother the citizen in the soldier's bosom." Although a Republican in his youth, he eventually converted to the monarchist creed, becoming one of its ardent supporters, as he made clear to the Baron of Cotegipe on 15 April 1879:

"I have been, for a long time, a liberal monarchist, unionist of the Empire of Brazil. Do not think that I am going to the Republic, or to despotism; But I will tell the noble senator that in matters of public service I do not inquire about where Brazilians stand in politics, but I do ask if they fulfill their duty for the good of the country."

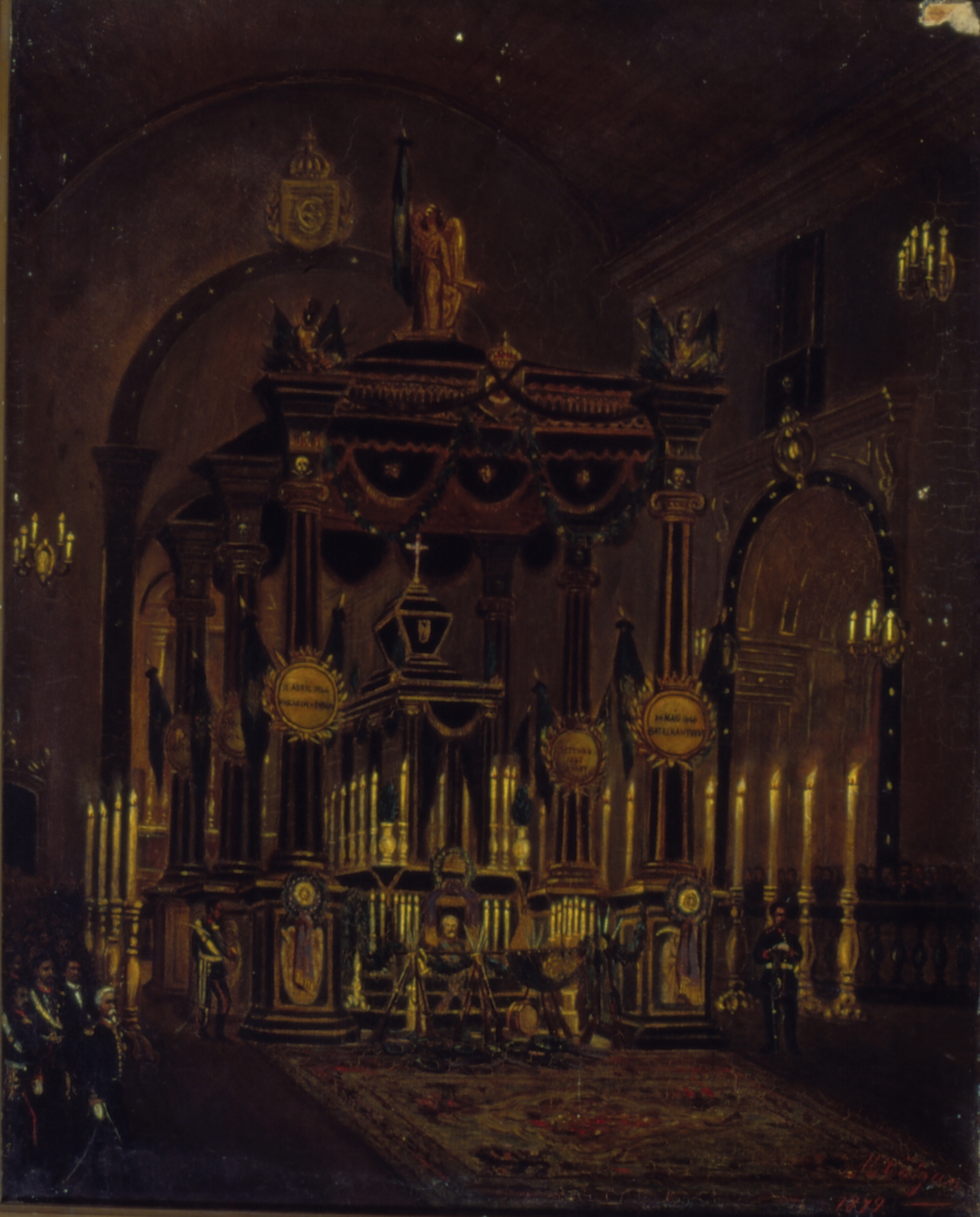
Funeral of the Marquis of Erval in the Imperial Chapel, 1879

By decree of 2 June 1877, he was granted the rank of Marshal of the Army. With the rise to power of the Liberal Party, Osório was appointed Minister of War in the Sinimbu's cabinet in 1878. He remained in office until his death on 4 October 1879, in Rio de Janeiro, at the age of 71, from pneumonia.

== Legacy ==
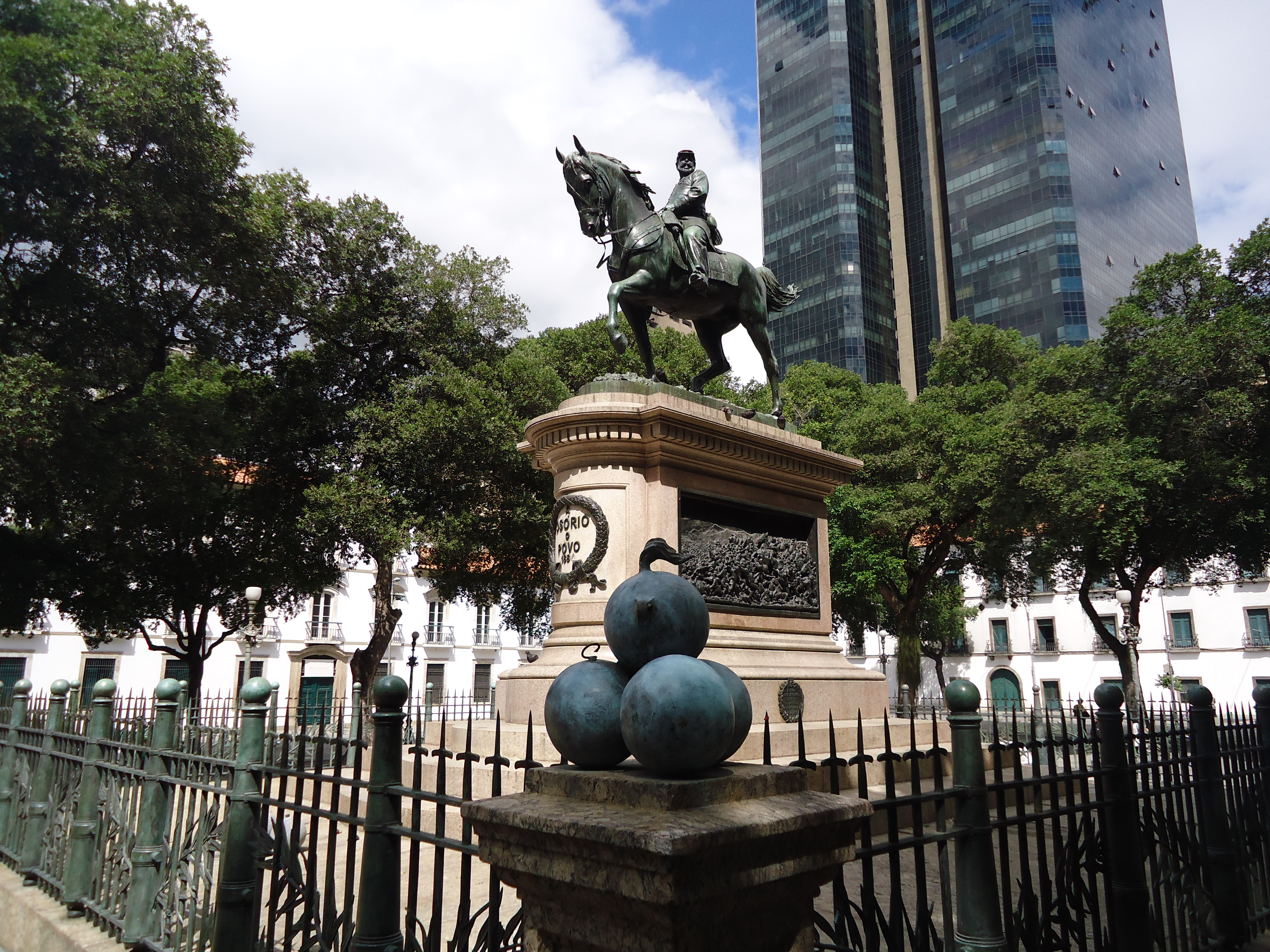
Equestrian statue of General Osório, in Praça XV de Novembro, Rio de Janeiro.

With his death, followed by other military monarchists loyal to Pedro II, such as Luís Alves de Lima e Silva (Duke of Caxias) and Polidoro da Fonseca Quintanilha Jordão (Viscount of Santa Teresa), opened space for a new generation of military personnel who were strongly influenced by the caudilloism and insubordinate military of the neighboring countries and who were for the most part indifferent to the monarchy, if not opponents. In spite of having died ten years before the advent of the Republic in Brazil it is possible to know his opinion about the acts of Deodoro da Fonseca and Floriano Peixoto (both veterans of the Paraguayan War) besides having been insubordinate and betrayed the legal government they also became the first two presidents and dictators of the country:

"It would be a wretch who, having fought the external enemy with the weapons of war, would then place those same weapons at the service of despotism, persecution and violence against his countrymen."

The bier with its remains, embalmed, was placed in the chapel of the War Arsenal, now destroyed. On 16 November 1879, his remains were taken to the Asylum of the Invalides of the Homeland, on the Island of Bom Jesus da Coluna, where they remained until the transfer to the Church of Santa Cruz dos Militares, on 3 December 1887. On 21 July 1892, his body was transferred to the crypt built under his equestrian statue, fused with the bronze of cannons taken in the War of the Triple Alliance, in Praça Quinze de Novembro, in Rio de Janeiro. Finally, on 1 December 1993, the solemn transfer of the mortal remains of Marshal Osório began, passing through the Municipalities of Pelotas, Rio Grande and Porto Alegre. On 11 December his body was deposited in the vault near the house where he was born, already inside the historical park created there.

== Honors ==
Throughout his life he was awarded the titles of Baron of Herval (1 May 1866), Viscount of Herval (11 April 1868) and Marquis of Herval (29 December 1869). Conceição do Arroio, the city where he was born, began to be called Osório in 1934, without popular consultation, by order of the Federal Comptroller José Antônio Flores da Cunha. The EE-T1 Osório, a Brazilian tank prototype, was baptized in his honor. His name was inscribed in the Steel Book, at the Pantheon of Liberty and Democracy, in Brasília. In addition, numerous streets, squares and institutions were created or renamed with his name throughout the country.

== Bibliography ==
=== References ===
- Carvalho, José Murilo de (2007). D. Pedro II: ser ou não ser (in Portuguese). São Paulo: Companhia das Letras.
- Lira, Heitor (1977). História de Dom Pedro II (1825–1891): Ascenção (1825–1870) (in Portuguese). Vol. 1. Belo Horizonte: Itatiaia.
- Lira, Heitor (1977). História de Dom Pedro II (1825–1891): Fastígio (1870–1880) (in Portuguese). Vol. 2. Belo Horizonte: Itatiaia.
- Lira, Heitor (1977). História de Dom Pedro II (1825–1891): Declínio (1880–1891) (in Portuguese). Vol. 3. Belo Horizonte: Itatiaia.
