= List of ambassadors of France to Germany =

This list of ambassadors of France to Germany and precursors of the modern German state also includes top-ranking French diplomats in Germany who did not formally have the ambassador title.

== Ambassadors to the Holy Roman Empire ==
The former French Legation to the Perpetual Diet in Regensburg

- 1630–1633: François Leclerc du Tremblay
- 1653–1654: François Cazet de Vautorte
- 1658–1674: Robert de Gravel
- 1679–1688: Louis de Verjus
- 1716–1723: Jacques-Vincent Languet de Gergy
- 1726–1730: Théodore Chevignard de Chavigny
- 1741–1742: Charles Louis Auguste Fouquet de Belle-Isle
- 1763–1772: Louis-Gabriel Du Buat-Nançay
- 1775–1780: Marc Marie de Bombelles
- 1797–1799: Théobald Bacher

== Ambassadors to the German Confederation ==
Ambassadors to the German Confederation, also accredited to the Free City of Frankfurt, include:

- 1818–1830: Charles-Frédéric Reinhard (1761–1837)
- 1830–1839: Jean Baptiste de Alleye de Ciprey (1784-184?)
- 1840–1842: Antoine Louis Deffaudis (1786–1869)
- 1842–1847: Justin de Chasseloup-Laubat (1800–1847)
- 1848–1855: Auguste Bonaventure de Tallenay (1795–1863)
- 1855–1858: Gustave de Montessuy
- 1858–1864: Alfred de Salignac-Fénelon (1810–1883)
- 1864–1866: Edmé de Reculot (1815–1891)

For partial lists, see footnote and.

== Ambassadors to German states ==
France established permanent diplomatic missions to individual German states during the Thirty Years War or shortly thereafter, most notably Bavaria, Cologne, Prussia, Saxony and the free Hanseatic cities at Hamburg, all of which date from a time around the 1620s to 1640s.

Bavaria: French envoys to the Bavarian Court at Munich

- 1624–1626: Victor Claude Alexandre de Faneau
- 1626–1631: Henri de Gournay de Marcheville
- 1631–1632: Hercule de Charnacé
- 1679–1680: Charles Colbert de Croissy
- 1687–1688: Claude-Louis-Hector de Villars
- 1743–1745: Daniel François de Gélas de Lautrec
- 1745–1746: Théodore Chevignard de Chavigny
- 1746–1748: Armand de Vignerot du Plessis
- 1748–1755: François de Baschi
- 1755–1756: Hubert de Folard
- 1756–1757: Louis-Gabriel Du Buat-Nançay
- 1776–1776: François Barbé-Marbois
- 1777–1778: Anne-César de La Luzerne
- 1780–1789: Messire Louis de Montezan
- 1792–1792: Frédéric Flamen d'Assigny
- 1798–1799: Charles-Jean-Marie Alquier
- 1803–1809: Louis-Guillaume Otto
- 1810–1814: Louis de Narbonne-Lara
- 1814–1816: Jules de Polignac
- 1816–1820: Auguste Delagarde
- 1821–1826: Louis-Toussaint de la Moussaye
- 1827–1831: Marie-Théodore de Rumigny
- 1832–1833: Charles-Joseph Bresson
- 1833–1834: Alfred de Vaudreuil
- 1835–1849: Paul-Charles-Amable de Bourgoing
- 1850–1851: Édouard Thouvenel
- 1880–1882: Gustave Olivier Lannes de Montebello
- 1888–1896: Camille Barrère
- 1897–1904: Jules Henrys d'Aubigny
- 1904–1907: Alfred Chilhaud-Dumaine
- 1907–1909: Ernest René Joseph Adrien Bourgarel
- 1909–1914: Henri Allizé
- 1920–1924: Émile Dard
- 1924–1933: Charles François de Paule Lefèvre d'Ormesson
- 1933–1934: Aimé Leroy

Cologne: French envoys to the Cologne Court at Bonn

- 1758–1760: Louis Auguste Le Tonnelier de Breteuil

Hamburg: French envoys to Lübeck, Bremen and Hamburg

- 1637–1642: Claude de Mesmes
- 1661–1675: Pierre Bidal d'Asfeld
- 1768–1770: Emmanuel Marie Louis de Noailles
- 1788–1790: Jean-François de Bourgoing
- 1795–1805: Charles-Frédéric Reinhard
- 1805–1810: Louis Antoine Fauvelet de Bourrienne
- 1825–1829: Jean Baptiste Gaspard Roux de Rochelle

Prussia: French envoys to the Brandenburg-Prussian Court at Berlin

- 1614–1614: Jean Hotman, Marquis de Villers-St-Paul
- 1655–1656: Antoine de Lumbres
- 1660–1661: Charles Colbert de Croissy
- 1661–1661: Hugues de Lionne
- 1679–1679: Simon Arnauld, Marquis de Pomponne
- 1715–1715: Jean-Baptiste Colbert, Marquess of Torcy
- 1732–1739: Jacques-Joachim Trotti, marquis de La Chétardie
- 1740–1748: Louis Guy Henri de Valori
- 1750–1752: Richard Francis Talbot
- 1756–1756: Louis Jules Mancini Mazarini
- 1768–1769: Adrien-Louis de Bonnières
- 1790–1791: Elénor-François-Elie, Comte de Moustier
- 1798–1799: Emmanuel Joseph Sieyès
- 1799–1800: Louis-Guillaume Otto
- 1800–1802: Pierre de Ruel, marquis de Beurnonville
- 1802–1804: Louis Pierre Édouard, Baron Bignon
- 1805–1806: Antoine de Laforêt
- 1799–1806: Géraud Duroc, special envoy
- 1808–1813: Antoine Marie Philippe Asinari de Saint-Marsan
- 1814–1816: Louis Charles Victor de Riquet de Caraman
- 1816–1821: Charles François, Marquis de Bonnay
- 1821–1822: François-René de Chateaubriand
- 1822–1824: Maximilien Gérard de Rayneval
- 1824–1825: Paul-Charles-Amable de Bourgoing
- 1825–1828: Emmanuel Louis Marie Guignard de Saint-Priest
- 1828–1831: Hector-Philippe, comte d'Agoult
- 1831–1831: Carel Hendrik Ver Huell
- 1831–1831: Charles, comte de Flahaut
- 1833–1834: Charles Joseph, comte Bresson
- 1843–1849: Napoléon-Hector Soult, marquis of Dalmatia
- 1849–1849: Jean Gilbert Victor Fialin, duc de Persigny
- 1849–1850: Emmanuel Arago
- 1850–1851: Alexandre, comte de Lurde
- 1851–1853: Armand Lefebvre
- 1853–1859: Lionel de Moustier
- 1859–1862: Godefroi de La Tour d'Auvergne-Lauraguais
- 1863–1864: Charles de Talleyrand-Périgord
- 1864–1870: Vincent Benedetti

Saxony: French envoys to the Saxon Court at Dresden

- 1815-1816: Joseph Fouché
- 1816-1817: Marc-René, count of Montalambert
- 1816, 1817-1818: Edouard Dillon
- 1818–1820: Victor de Fay de La Tour-Maubourg
- 1820–1827: Marie-Théodore de Rumigny
- 1827–1830: Georges de Riquet de Caraman
- 1830–1832: Charles-Frédéric Reinhard
- 1832–1835: Paul-Charles-Amable de Bourgoing

At the time of the German Confederation additional missions were opened in Baden, Hanover, Hesse-Kassel, Hesse-Darmstadt, Nassau and Württemberg. After disestablishment of the German Confederation and establishment of the North-German Confederation, France's mission at Berlin became France's principal mission to Germany.

== Ambassadors to the German Empire and Germany (1871–1939) ==
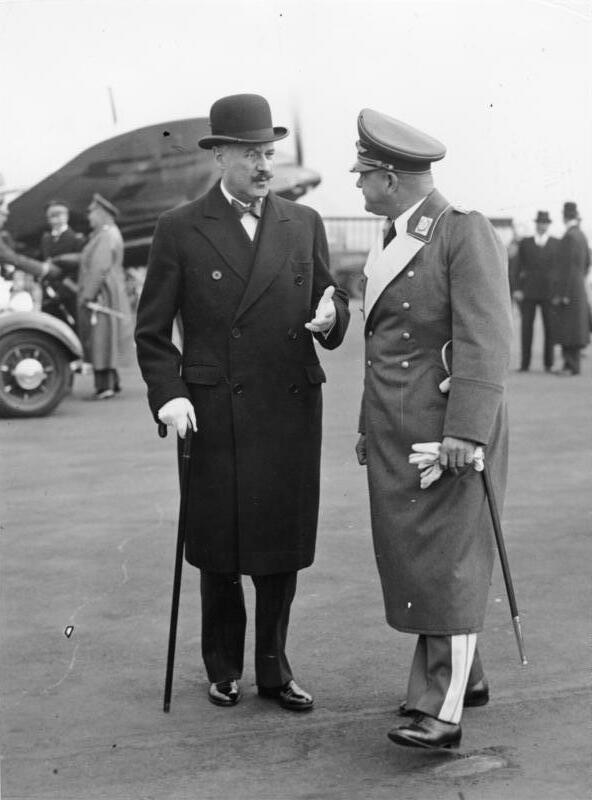
Ambassador André François-Poncet with German field marshal Erhard Milch

For main sources for this section, see footnote and.

Start of term	End of term	Ambassador
1872	1877	Elie de Gontaut-Biron
1877	1881	Raymond de Saint-Vallier
1881	1886	Alphonse Chodron de Courcel
1886	1896	Jules Gabriel Herbette
1896	1902	Emmanuel Henri Victurnien de Noailles
1902	1907	Georges Paul Louis Bihourd
1907	1914	Jules Cambon
1914	1920	Break in diplomatic relations during World War I and its aftermath
June 1920	December 1922	Charles François Laurent
1922	1931	Pierre de Margerie
1931	1938	André François-Poncet
1938	1939	Robert Coulondre

== Ambassadors to West Germany ==
For main sources for this section, see footnote and.

Diplomatic relations between France and Germany were cut following the invasion of Poland in 1939. France restored diplomatic relations with West Germany in 1949 and with East Germany in 1973.

Start of term	End of term	Ambassador
1949	1955	André François-Poncet (Allied High Commissioner from 1949 to 1955 and ambassador after August 1, 1955)
1955	1956	Louis Joxe
1956	1958	Maurice Couve de Murville
1958	1962	François Seydoux de Clausonne
1962	1965	Roland de Margerie
1965	1970	François Seydoux de Clausonne
1970	1974	Jean Sauvagnargues
1974	1977	Olivier Wormser
1977	1981	Jean-Pierre Brunet
1981	1983	Henri Froment-Meurice
1983	1986	Jacques Morizet
1986	1992	Serge Boidevaix (German reunification occurred in 1990)

== Ambassadors to East Germany ==
For the main source for this section, see footnote and.

Diplomatic relations between France and Germany were cut following the invasion of Poland in 1939. France restored diplomatic relations with West Germany in 1949 and with East Germany in 1973.

Start of term	End of term	Ambassador (or diplomat of highest rank)
1973	1974	Jacques Jessel (Chargé d'Affaires)
1974	1976	Bernard Guillier de Chalvron
1976	1981	Henry Bayle
1981	1981	Xavier du Cauzé de Nazelle
1981	1986	Maurice Deshors
1986	1990 (German reunification)	Joëlle Timsit

== Ambassadors to post-reunification Germany ==
For main sources for this section, see footnote and.

Start of term	End of term	Ambassador
1986	1992	Serge Boidevaix (German reunification occurred in 1990)
1992	1993	Bertrand Dufourcq
1993	1999	François Scheer
1999	2007	Claude Martin
2007	2011	Bernard de Montferrand
2011	2014	Maurice Gourdault-Montagne
2014	2017	Philippe Étienne
2017	2022	Anne-Marie Descôtes
2022		François Delattre

== See also ==
- France–Germany relations
- List of ambassadors of Germany to France
