= List of ambassadors of France to Austria =

French ambassadors to Austria

This is an incomplete list of ambassadors from France to Austria.

== To the Court of Vienna in the XVI Century ==
- 1535 – 1540 : M. de Villy
- 1540 – 1541 : Georges de Selve
- 1540 – 1547 : Antoine Hellin
- 1547 – 1547 : Charles de Cossé, Count of Brissac

== To the Court of Vienna in the XVII Century ==
- 1620 – 1620 : Charles de Valois, Duke of Angoulême
- 1620 – 1620 : Philippe de Béthune
- 1620 – 1620 : Charles de l'Aubespine
- 1625 – 1627 : Caspar de Valembourg
- 1627 – 1632 : Jean Ceberet
- 1630 – 1630 : Charles Chrétien de Gournay
- 1630 – 1630 : Charles Ier Brûlart de Genlis
- 1630 – 1630 : François Leclerc du Tremblay
- 1630 – 1635 : Nicolas de Charbonnières
- 1638 – 1639 : Jean de Lonlay
- 1639 – 1648 : Thirty Years' War
- 1649 – 1650 : François de Lopis de Mondevergue
- 1656 – 1656 : Robert de Wignacourt
- 1656 – 1656 : Adolphe-Guillaume de Crosieg
- 1660 – 1660 : Charles Colbert de Vandières
- 1660 – 1663 : Gaspar de Teves y Tello de Guzmán, Marquis de la Fuente
- 1663 – 1664 : Sire de Jeucour
- 1664 – 1673 : Jacques Bretel de Grémonville
- 1673 – 1678 : Franco-Dutch War
- 1679 – 1680 : Nicolas-Marie de l’Hospital
- 1680 – 1683 : François Cadot
- 1684 – 1684 : Louis de Clermont-Gallerande
- 1684 – 1687 : André de Bétoulat
- 1687 – 1687 : Claude-Louis Hector
- 1687 – 1689 : Claude-Hugues de Lezay
- 1692 – 1693 : Abbé Jean Morel
- 1692 – 1693 : Hugues-Louis baron de Reding
- 1692 – 1693 : Charles chevalier de Stainville
- 1692 – 1693 : Schaffhauser
- 1688 – 1697 : Nine Years' War
- 1697 – 1698 : De Linde (d’Imhoff)
- 1698 – 1702 : Claude-Louis Hector

== To the Court of Vienna and the Holy Roman Emperor, King of Hungary ==
- 1702 – 1714 : War of the Spanish Succession
- 1715 – 1717 : Charles-François de Vintimille du Luc
- 1717 – 1724 : Jean-Baptiste Radiguet
- 1724 – 1725 : Dieudonné Dumat
- 1725 – 1728 : Armand de Vignerot du Plessis
- 1728 – 1733 : François de Bussy
- 1733 – 1735 : War of the Polish Succession
- 1735 – 1737 : Jean-Gabriel de la Porte Dutheil
- 1738 – 1739 : Gaston Pierre de Lévis
- 1740 – 1748 : War of the Austrian Succession
- 1749 – 1750 : Louis-Augustin Blondel
- 1750 – 1753 : Emmanuel-Dieudonné d’Hautefort
- 1753 – 1757 : Henri Joseph Bouchard d'Esparbès de Lussan d'Aubeterre
- 1757 – 1757 : Louis Charles César Le Tellier
- 1757 – 1758 : Étienne François, duc de Choiseul
- 1758 – 1761 : César Gabriel de Choiseul
- 1761 – 1766 : Louis-Marie-Florent de Lomont, Duke of Châtelet
- 1767 – 1770 : Jacques Aimeric Joseph de Durfort, marquis de Civrac
- 1770 – 1770 : Louis Auguste Le Tonnelier de Breteuil
- 1770 – 1771 : François-Michel Durand de Distroff
- 1771 – 1774 : Louis-René-Édouard de Rohan-Guémené
- 1774 – 1774 : Jean-François Géorgel
- 1774 – 1783 : Louis Auguste Le Tonnelier de Breteuil (2nd term)
- 1783 – 1792 : Emmanuel Marie Louis de Noailles
- 1792 – 1800 : Wars of the French Revolution
- February 1798 – 14 April 1798 : Jean-Baptiste Bernadotte
- 1800 – 1801 : Géraud Duroc
- 1801 – 1804 : Jean-Baptiste de Nompère de Champagny

== To the Empire of Austria ==
- 1805 – 1806 : Alexandre-François de La Rochefoucauld
- 1806 – 1809 : Antoine-François Andréossy
- 1816 – 1818 : Victor de Riquet, 1st Duke of Caraman
- 1830 – 1832 : Nicolas Joseph Maison
- 1841 – 1848 : Charles Joseph, comte de Flahaut
- 1848 – April 1849 : Pascal Pierre Duprat
- April 1849 – September 1849 : Édouard de Lacour
- September 1849 – December 1849 : Gustave de Beaumont
- December 1849 – 1853 : Édouard de Lacour
- 1853 – 1859 : François-Adolphe de Bourqueney
- 1859 – 1861 : Lionel de Moustier
- 1861 – 1870 : Agénor de Gramont

== To the Monarchy of Austria-Hungary ==
- July 1870 – August 1870 : Godefroi, prince de La Tour d'Auvergne-Lauraguais
- August 1870 – March 1871 : Comte de Mosbourg
- March 1871 – September 1873 : Charles de Banneville
- September 1873 – May 1875 : Bernard d'Harcourt
- May 1875 – February 1879 : Melchior de Vogüé
- February 1879 – April 1880 : Pierre Edmond Teisserenc de Bort
- April 1880 – August 1883 : Comte Duchâtel
- August 1883 – July 1886 : Comte Foucher de Careil
- July 1886 – November 1893 : Albert Decrais
- November 1893 – October 1897 : Henri-Auguste Lozé
- October 1897 – January 1907 : Jacques Frédéric de Reverseaux de Rouvrays
- January 1907 – May 1912 : Philippe Crozier
- May 1912 – August 1914 : Alfred Chilhaud-Dumaine
- World War I

== To the Republic of Austria ==
- April 1919 – February 1920 : Henri Allizé
- 1920 – 1924 : Pierre Lefèvre-Pontalis
- 1924 – 1926 : Maurice Delarüe Caron de Beaumarchais
- 1926 – 1928 : Louis Pineton de Chambrun
- 1928 – 1933 : Comte Clauzel
- 1933 – march 1938 : Gabriel Puaux
- March 1938 – October 1938 : Jean Chauvel (consul general)
- October 1938 – December 1938 : Jacques Chartier (consul general)
- World War II
- 1945 – 1946 : Gabriel Padovani
- 1946 – 1946 : Louis de Monicault
- 1946 – 1950 : Général Antoine Béthouart
- 1950 – 1955 : Jean Payart
- 1955 – 1955 : Jean Chauvel
- 1955 – 1958 : François Seydoux de Clausonne
- 1958 – 1961 : Étienne de Crouy-Chanel
- 1961 – 1963 : René Brouillet
- 1963 – 1968 : Louis Roché
- 1968 – 1973 : François Leduc
- 1973 – 1975 : Augustin Jordan
- November 1973 – November 1975 : Augustin Jordan
- November 1975 – August 1978 : Georges Gaucher
- August 1978 – May 1981 : Jacques Schricke
- May 1981 − May 1983 : Raymond Bressier
- May 1983 − April 1985 : Jean Audibert
- April 1985 − December 1988 : François-Régis Bastide
- December 1988 − June 1991 : Jean-François Noiville
- June 1991 − 1996 : André Roderic Lewin
- 1996 − 1997 : Mme France de Harting
- January 1998 − October 2001 : Jean Cadet
- November 2001 − January 2005 : Alain Catta
- January 2005 − September 2008 : Pierre Viaux
- October 2008 – March 2012 : Philippe Carré
- March 2012 – June 2014 : Stéphane Gompertz
- June 2014 – June 2017 : Pascal Teixeira da Silva
- June 2017 – June 2020 : François Saint-Paul
- September 2020 – 2024 : Gilles Pécout
- 2024 – present : Matthieu Peyraud

== Sources ==
- 1981 pp. La France en Autriche − Ambassade de France à Vienne (in French)
