= Buat =

Buat is a surname. Notable people with the surname include:

- Edmond Buat (1868–1923), French general
- Louis-Gabriel Du Buat-Nançay (1732–1787), French writer
- Pierre-Louis-Georges du Buat (1734–1809), French engineer
- Véronique Buat (born 1962), French astrophysicist
