= Gilles Pécout =

French historian, academic and diplomat (born 1961)

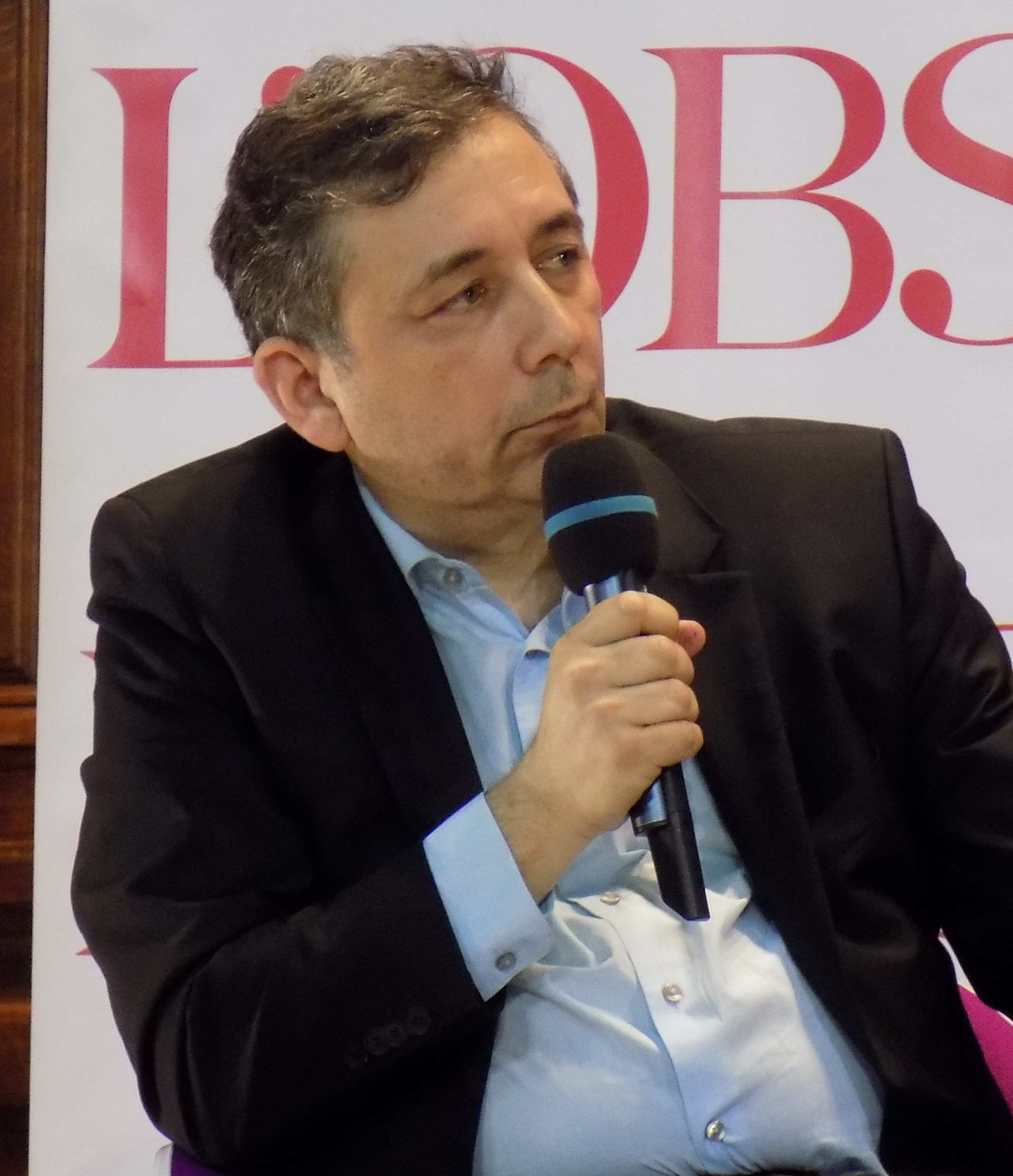
- Pécout at the French History Culture Forum in 2015

Ambassador of France to Austria
- In office 1 October 2020 – 18 December 2024
- Preceded by: François Saint-Paul
- Succeeded by: Matthieu Peyraud

Personal details
- Born: 2 December 1961 (age 64) Marseille, France
- Occupation: Historian, academic, diplomat

Gilles Pécout (French pronunciation: [ʒil peku]; born 2 December 1961) is a French historian, academic and former diplomat who has been president of the Bibliothèque nationale de France (BnF) since 18 April 2024. He was formerly the Ambassador of France to Austria (2020–2024).

== Biography ==
Pécout was born in Marseille in 1961. He graduated from the École normale supérieure in Paris, where he was also a professor in and the director (2010–2014) of the History Department.

He held the chair of Political and Cultural History of 19th-century Italy and Mediterranean Europe at the Sorbonne. He is known to the Italian public thanks to his participation in the RAI3 television programme Il tempo e la storia and its sequel Passato e presente, of which he was also a member of the scientific committee.

On 4 June 2014, Pécout was appointed rector of the Académie de Nancy-Metz. On 3 October 2016, he was appointed rector of the Académie de Paris.

On 1 October 2020 he became Ambassador of France to Austria, when he presented his letter of credence to President Alexander Van der Bellen. He has been president of the Bibliothèque nationale de France since 18 April 2024.

== Works ==
The author of several works and scientific editions and director or co-director of eight volumes, Pécout has published 75 articles in French and foreign scientific journals (Italy, United States, Greece, United Kingdom, Japan, China) and occasionally collaborated with the daily newspapers Le Monde, Libération, and the Italian press.

- Birth of Contemporary Italy, 1770–1922, Nathan, 1997; reissued, Armand Colin, 2004
- Atlas of French History, Autrement, 2007
- Grand Atlas of the History of France, under the direction of Jean Boutier, with Olivier Guyotjeannin, Autrement, 2011

== Honours ==
=== French honours ===

Chevalier de la Légion d'honneur
— 18 April 2014

Chevalier de l'ordre national du Mérite
— 14 May 2010

Commandeur de l'ordre des Palmes académiques
— 3 June 2014

Officier de l'ordre des Arts et des Lettres
— 12 March 2019

=== Italian honours ===
Grand Officer of the Order of Merit of the Italian Republic – 27 December 2021
