= Schedel Arboretum and Gardens =

Botanical garden and arboretum in Elmore, Ohio, United States

Coordinates: 41°28.1′N 83°18.3′W

- Interactive map of Schedel Arboretum and Gardens
- Website: www.schedel-gardens.org

The Schedel Arboretum and Gardens is a well-preserved botanical garden and arboretum on the bank of a river in Elmore, Ohio in the United States. It first opened to the public in 1991.

== History ==
Joseph and Marie Schedel purchased a hundred-acre tract of undeveloped land surrounding a charming Victorian mansion on the Portage River, near Elmore, Ohio (in the north-west portion of the state, near Toledo) in 1929. Extensively traveled, the Schedels had acquired many lovely possessions which they wished to display, such as Persian carpets, a world-class Jade collection, hand-wrought teak furniture, prayer rugs, Japanese silk embroidery, and a thousand-year-old Bronze sculpture. Around the mansion they developed an arboretum, planting 25 varieties of Japanese maple, 16 species of pine, including Bristlecone pine, Bald cypress, Golden chain tree, cucumber and umbrella magnolia, Japanese silver bell, various types of beech, bamboo, katsura, Franklin Trees, and nearly 50 lilac varieties. In several separate beds they introduced English-style landscapes, flowering displays, and a Japanese garden. They installed greenhouses, where annuals are prepared; each spring some 15,000 plants are transplanted from the greenhouse to the grounds, installed among perennials, trees, and shrubs. The Japanese Garden includes bridges, stone lanterns, and a stupa. Two waterfalls empty into pools or streams which flow into two lakes.

The Schedels, who had no children, wished for their effort to continue for the benefit of the entire region. In 1963 they established The Joseph J. & Marie P. Schedel Foundation, with the aim of protecting and preserving their estate for the enjoyment of present and future generations. To that end, the Foundation in 1989 established The Schedel Foundation Arboretum and Gardens,

The Schedels died during the 1980s. The first director of the Arboretum Foundation was T. Richard Fisher, who was able to first open the Garden to the public in 1991. Since that time the staff have increased the quantity and diversity of plant offerings on the grounds.

Current director of the Arboretum Foundation is Rodney Noble

The Blair Museum of Lithophanes, the world's largest collection, moved to the arboretum from the Toledo Botanical Garden in 2021.

== Description of the site ==
The site is located at a bend in the Portage River; about half the site is upland, with the remainder lowland. There is a sharp drop between the two, and this split character allows for a variety of plantings. There are permanent sculpture installations among the plantings, and in addition the Foundation hosts rotating exhibits of sculptures and other artistic works. A Beautiful place to visit.

Schedel Arboretum and Gardens are located at 19255 West Portage River South Road, Elmore, Ohio 43416. The gardens are open for "preview" during selected dates in April, and are open to the public from May through October. An admission fee is charged for non members, with members having free access.

A reception center on the site is offered to the public for events such as weddings and large receptions. This large center also houses a gift shop, offices, gallery and more. This opened in 2008.

== See also ==
- List of botanical gardens in the United States
