= Jacques Tiné =

French diplomat

- Born: May 24, 1914; Algiers, French Algeria
- Died: April 19, 2009 (aged 94)
- Occupation: Diplomat

Jacques Tiné (French pronunciation: [ʒak tine]; 1914-2009) was a French diplomat.

== Early life ==
Jacques Tiné was born on May 24, 1914, in Algiers, French Algeria. His father was a corporate director.

He was educated in Algiers. He then received a degree in law from the University of Paris and graduated from Sciences Po.

== Career ==
Tiné started his career as a diplomat in 1935. He was an attache at the French embassy in Los Angeles, California, in 1938–1939.

In 1941, he was recommended by Charles-Antoine Rochat to join the main bureau of the French Ministry of Foreign Affairs. Later, he replaced Bernard de Chalvron as an advisor on French Algeria to Marshal Philippe Pétain.

He served as the French Ambassador to Portugal from 1969 to 1973. He then served as France's permanent representative to NATO from 1975 to 1979.

== Death ==
He died on April 19, 2009.
