= Alfred Chilhaud-Dumaine =

Alfred Chilhaud-Dumaine (25 December 1852 – 6 February 1930) was a French diplomat.

== Early life ==
Chilhaud-Dumaine was born on 25 December 1852 in Paris. He was the son of Jean-Julien Chilhaud-Dumaine (1817–1894) and Pauline Léonie Lambert.

He attended the elite École Nationale des Chartes, graduating in 1877 with a thesis on Savari de Mauléon.

== Career ==
On 15 January 1877 he entered the Foreign Service. From 1887 to 1892 he was Secretary of Legation in Berlin. From 1904 to 1907 he was Minister in Munich. From 1907 to 1912 he was Minister in Mexico City. From 18 May 1912 to 10 August 1914 he was Minister in Vienna, replacing Philippe Crozier.

== Personal life ==
Chilhaud-Dumaine was married to Marcelle Haton de la Goupilliére, a daughter of Julien Haton de la Goupilliére and Noémie Goupil. Together, they were the parents of:

- Jacqueline Chilhaud-Dumaine (1890–1963), who married Pierre Gourlez de La Motte in 1920.
- Simone Chilhaud-Dumaine (1893–1972), who married Michel de Castéras in 1922.
- Jean Chilhaud-Dumaine

Chilhaud-Dumaine died in Paris on 6 February 1930.

Diplomatic posts
Preceded by Jules Henrys, Count d'Aubigny	French Ambassador in Munich; 1904–1907	Succeeded by Ernest René Joseph Adrien Bourgarel
Preceded by Camille Blondel	French Ambassador in Mexico City; 1907–1912	Succeeded by Paul Lefaivre
Preceded by Philippe Crozier	French Ambassador in Vienna; 1912–1914	Succeeded by Henri Allizé
