= Théodore Chevignard de Chavigny, comte de Toulongeon =

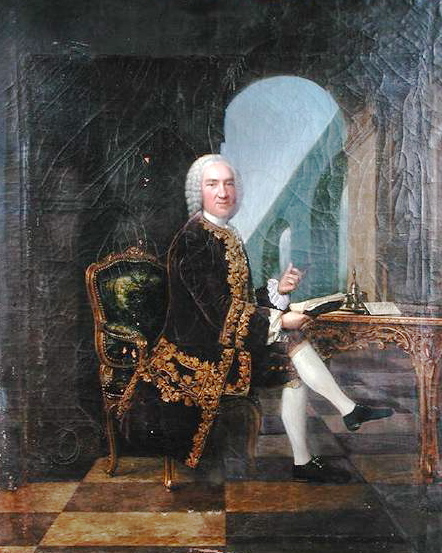
S.E. le comte de Toulongeon

Théodore Chevignard de Chavigny, Count of Toulongeon and Baron of Uchon (born 1687; died 1771) was a French aristocrat and diplomat.

The eldest son of Théodore Chevignard de Chavigny, Procurer-Royal and Mayor of Beaune. A Knight of Malta and already described as an experienced diplomat and secret agent, having been employed by the French Minister of Foreign Affairs at the time, the Marquis of Torcy, during secret negotiations in the Netherlands for the conclusion of the War of Spanish Succession in 1710, he was posted as French Ambassador to London in 1731, later serving in Copenhagen (1737–39) and Lisbon (1740-43), where his main task was to keep Portugal from entering the War of the Austrian Succession on the side of Britain, a task that was successfully achieved, as the Portuguese had little interest in joining the war. As Ambassador to the Electorate of Bavaria and at Frankfurt from 1745-46, he was a key player in French negotiations during the War of the Austrian Succession.

In 1746, King Louis XV posted him again as Ambassador to Portugal where served until 1749, before serving as Ambassador to the Republic of Venice and Switzerland between 1751 and 1762.

Chavigny was named governor of the city of Beaune since 1737 and a member of the Conseil du Roi. Chavigny also introduced his relative Charles Gravier, comte de Vergennes to French Diplomacy. He would later go on to become the French Ambassador in the Ottoman Empire, later serving in Sweden before becoming King Louis XVI's Minister of Foreign Affairs and rising to the post of France's Chief Minister, which he held until his death in 1787.

== Sources ==
- Murphy, Orville T. The Diplomatic Retreat of France and Public Opinion on the Eve of the French Revolution, 1783-1789. Catholic University of America Press, 1998.
