= Lithophane =

Backlit moulded thin porcelain artwork

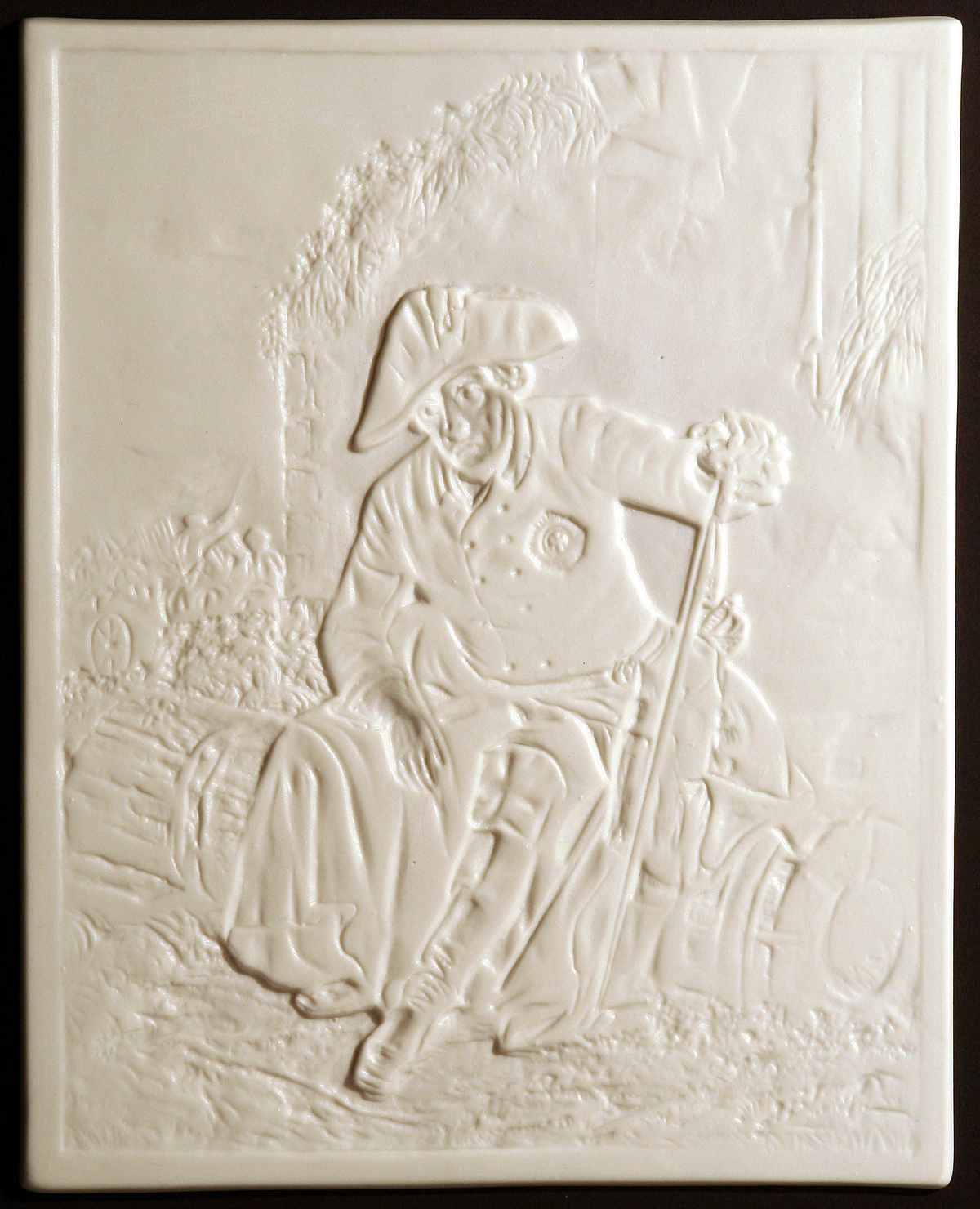
Lithophane of Frederick the Great, lit from front. After a well known painting by Julius Schrader (1849).

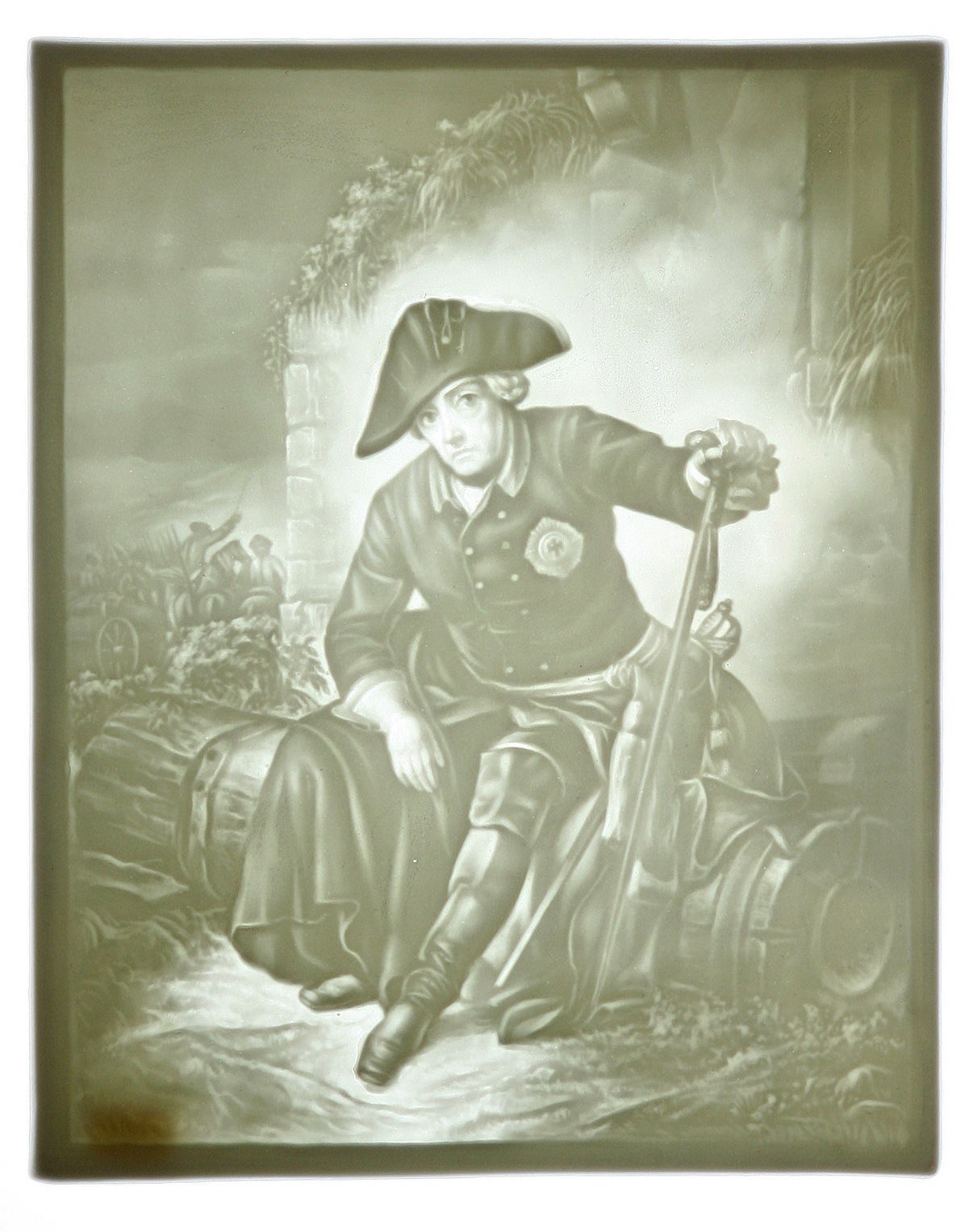
The same lithophane, backlit

A lithophane is a thin plaque of translucent material, normally porcelain, which has been moulded to varying thickness, such that when lit from behind the different thicknesses show as different shades, forming an image. Only when lit from behind does the image display properly. They were invented in the 19th century and became very popular, typically for lampshades, nightlights, or to be hung on windows. They could also be given stands, to be placed in front of a light source. The longest side of a lithophane is typically between 6 and 10 in (15 and 25 cm).

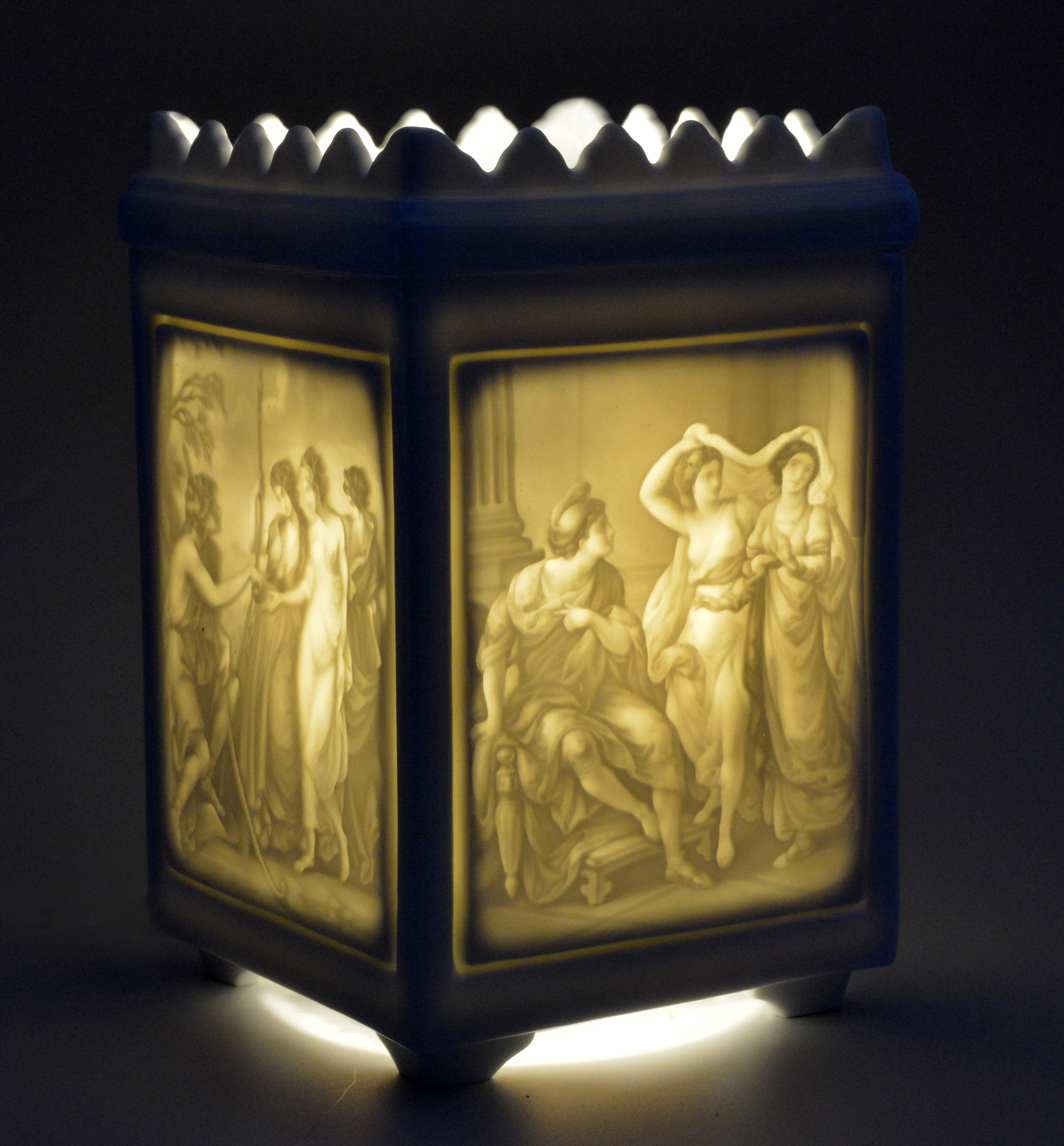
Lamp by Vista Alegre, Portugal

The images tended to be artistically unadventurous, mostly repeating designs from prints, or paintings via reproductive prints. A large number were rather sentimental domestic genre scenes, though there were also portraits, landscapes and religious subjects. The technique naturally produced images only in grisaille, tones of grey, but later ones were often painted in translucent paint such as that used for watercolours to give colour images. The name comes from Greek; lithos means "stone," and phainen, means "to cause to appear".

Invented in France in the 1820s, they rapidly became popular and produced in various countries. But Germany soon became the main producer, remaining so for the rest of the century. The largest producer was the Prussian Königliche Porzellan-Manufaktur (KPM) in Berlin, leading to "Berlin transparencies" becoming a common term for them in English. The Plauesche Porzellanmanufaktur in Plaue, Thuringia, Germany, was another large manufacturer, who continued to make them into the second half of the 20th century.

Their peak of production was from about 1840 to 1870. By the end of the 19th century lithophanes had largely fallen from fashion. In recent decades they have had something of a revival, with, in addition to porcelain, materials like glass, plastic or paper and techniques like 3D printing.

== Technique ==
To make a porcelain lithophane, a wax plaque was placed on a glass backing and carved, so that by lighting from behind the developing image could be seen in a similar fashion to the final lithophane. A cast of the wax was then taken in plaster of Paris, which became the reuseable mould for the porcelain. This was generally left unglazed as biscuit porcelain. As lithophanes became produced in larger numbers, more durable metal moulds were often used.

As the porcelain is in places only about 1/8 in (3.2 mm) thick, wastage in firing was high, up to about 60%.

== History ==
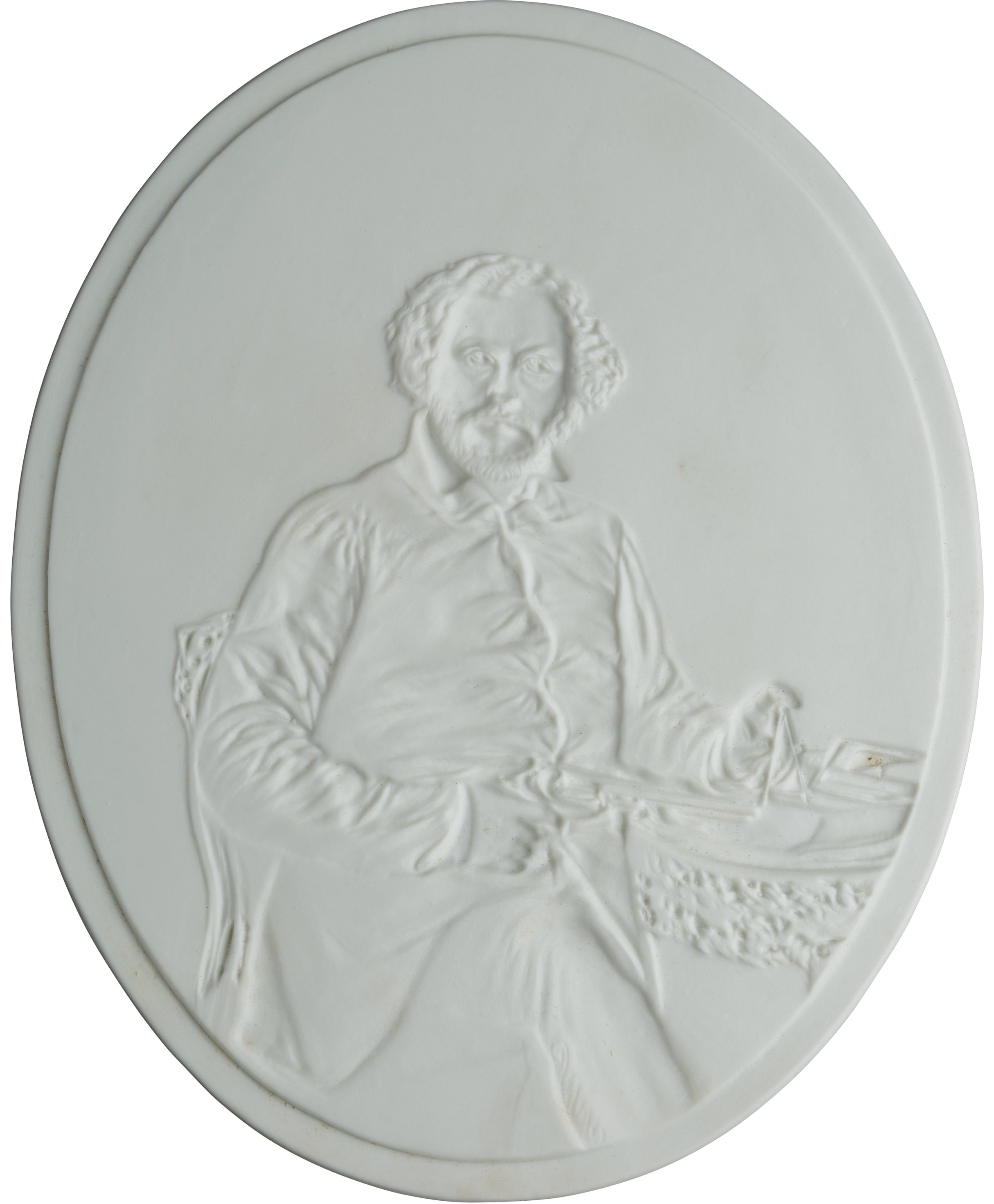
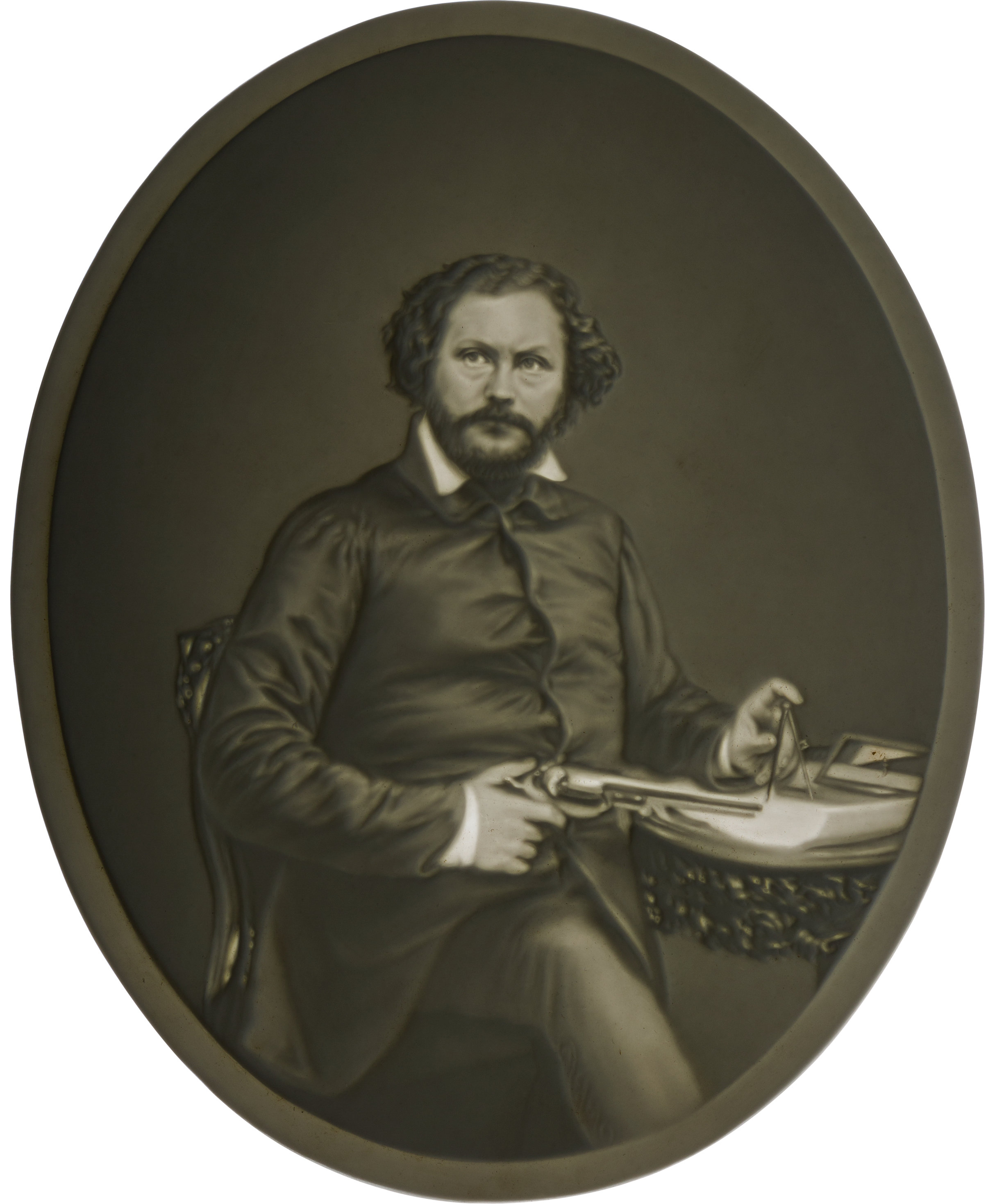
Lithophane of Samuel Colt in 1855, lit from front and back

There were precedents in Chinese porcelain, in a technique known as an hua, meaning "secret" or "hidden decoration". But this seems to have been produced by scratching or engraving the unfired porcelain body, and was mostly used for floral decoration, or text inscriptions, often Buddhist, rather than the images in the Western tradition. It was also mostly used on closed vessel shapes such as vases and teapots, suggesting that a backlit view was not intended to be used.

The European technique was invented by the French diplomat Baron Paul de Bourgoing (1791–1864), who patented it in 1827. His friend Baron Alexis du Tremblay had a pottery on his estate at Rubelles, and the earliest examples were made there. As de Bourgoing did not feel it appropriate, as a diplomat, for his name to be used in commerce, the lithophanes were marked "AdT" (for Tremblay's name).

Other factories quickly adopted the technique, many under licence from de Bourgoing. Meissen porcelain made them from 1829, and had made tens of thousands by 1850. Apart from Berlin and Plaue, mentioned above and perhaps the largest manufacturers, they were also made by Volkstedt, St Petersburg and Royal Copenhagen.

There was an English patent, under licence from Bourgoing, granted in 1828, to a Robert Griffith Jones, who then gave sub-licences to English factories including Mintons, Copelands (later part of Spode) and Grainger's Factory in Worcester, later merged into Royal Worcester.

By the end of the century the fashion was largely over, but lithophanes were made to commemorate the Coronation of Edward VII in 1902. By the middle of the 20th century, the technique was used in Japan, mostly for gaudy teasets for American soldiers after World War II, with the lithophaned face of a geisha at the bottom of the cups.

== Modern lithophanes ==
Porcelain lithophanes are still made in limited numbers, by both studio potters and large manufacturers such as Bernardaud and Wedgwood.

Similar effects can be achieved in moulded coloured glass, but these should probably not be called lithophanes. The term has revived in use for images created by digitally-controlled cutting ("CNC"), a subtractive process, or by 3D printing, an additive one. Many companies now offer to make one-off images, or the equipment to make them. Solutions are offered to add colour to these.

One of the earliest pioneers of the modern 3D-printed lithophane was artist Jonty Hurwitz, whose 2011 artwork Physics is Funny utilized early additive manufacturing to render a 3D lithophane. At this stage, creating 3D-printed lithophanes required complex manual processes to map 2D grayscale values into physical height variations. Open-source maker communities initially followed manual conversion workflows in modeling software, but the process was automated in April 2013 when MakerBot released a browser-based "Customizable Lithophane" tool. In 2015, developer Mark Durbin launched the open-source web generator 3dp.rocks, which widely popularized the medium by allowing users to easily render images into 3D meshes.

Modern consumer 3D printing primarily employs two technologies for lithophanes: fused deposition modeling (FDM), which uses standard thermoplastic filaments like white polylactic acid (PLA) extruded layer-by-layer to control light transmission through varying thickness, and stereolithography (SLA), which uses liquid photopolymer resins cured by light. SLA printing enables microscopic layer resolutions, achieving smooth, high-fidelity gradients that closely mimic the appearance of traditional 19th-century porcelain. Color lithophanes are achieved either through a hybrid method—placing a color-printed 2D transparency sheet directly behind a thin, white 3D-printed piece—or via multi-material 3D printing, which layers translucent cyan, magenta, yellow, and black (CMYK) plastics to mix colors when backlit.

== Collections ==
Most museums with a collection of 19th-century porcelain have examples of lithophanes, though only a small number are likely to be on display. The largest collection belongs to the Blair Museum of Lithophanes, now at the Schedel Arboretum and Gardens in Elmore, Ohio.

== Gallery ==
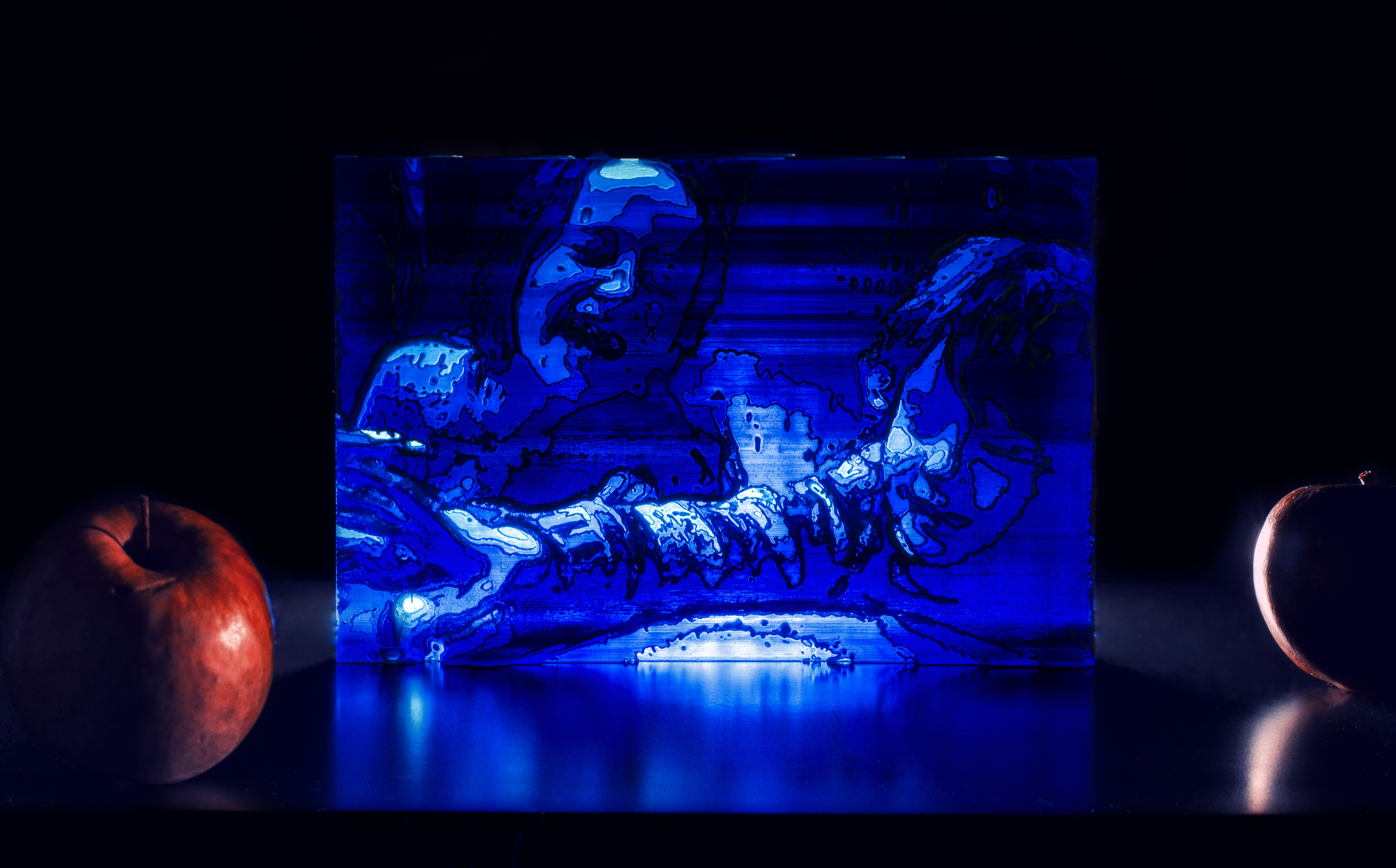
First 3D printed Lithophane, Jonty Hurwitz, 2011

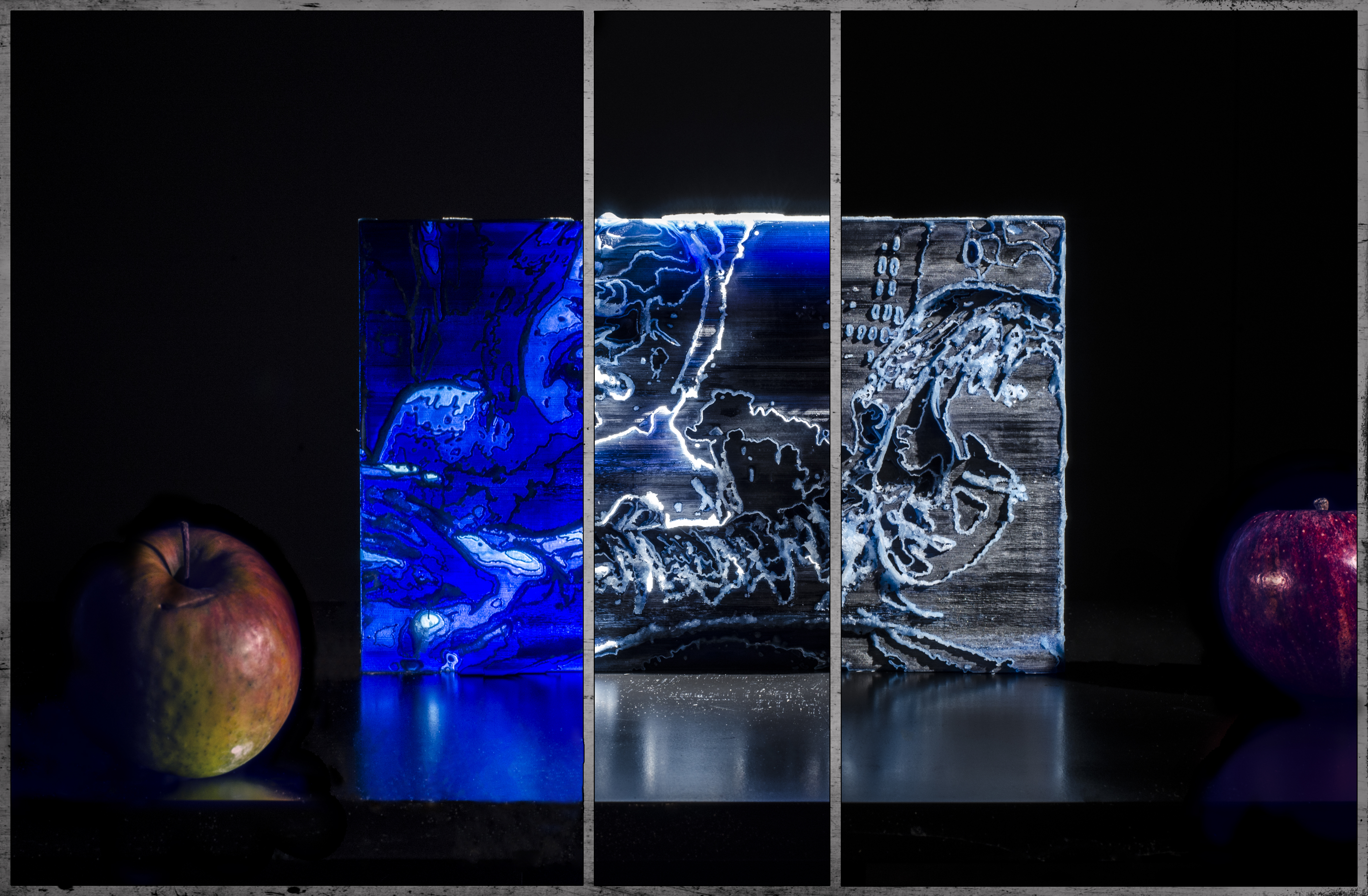
2011 3D printed Lithophane by Jonty Hurwitz showing how backlight reveals the content

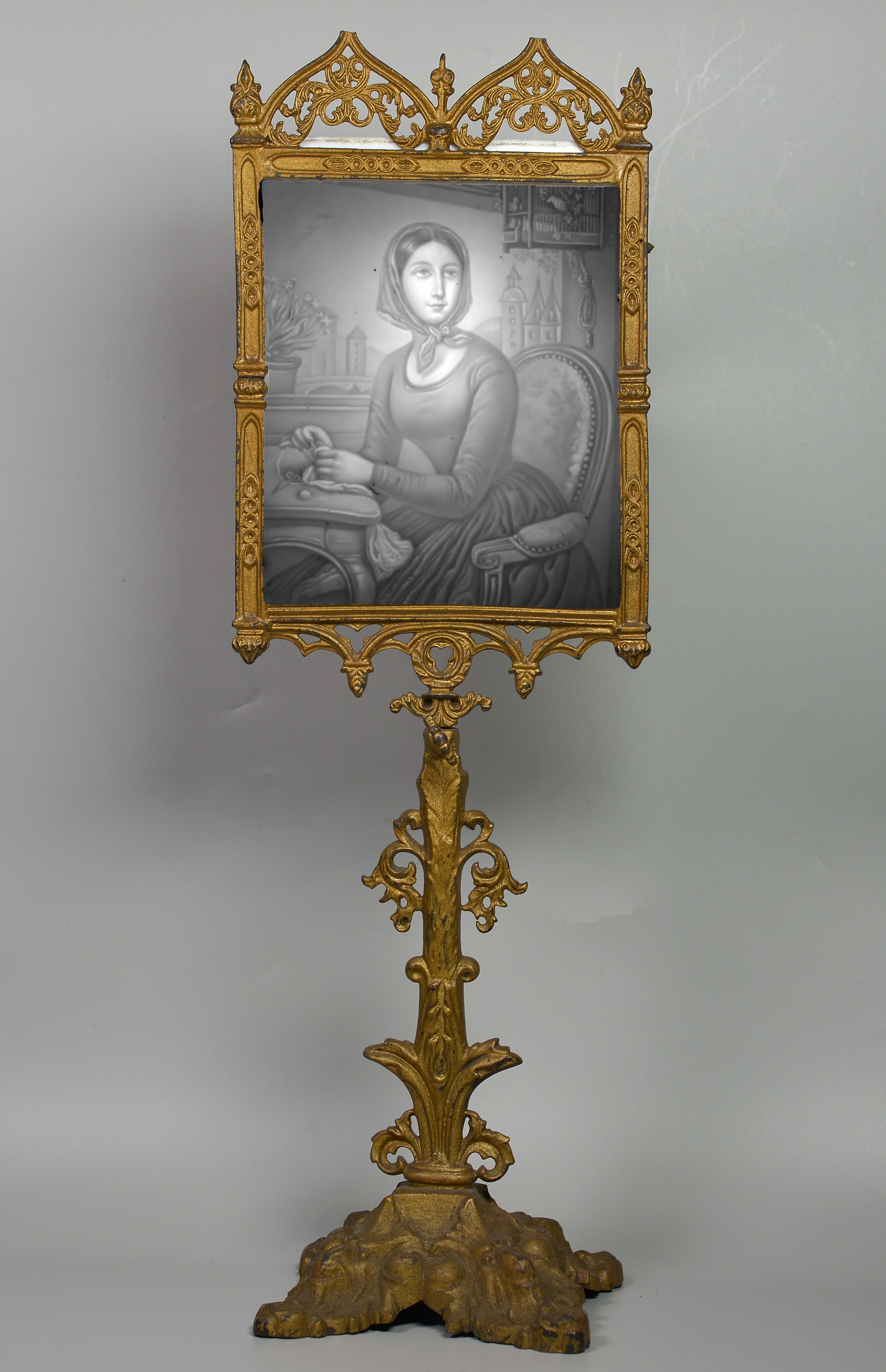
German, with cast-iron stand

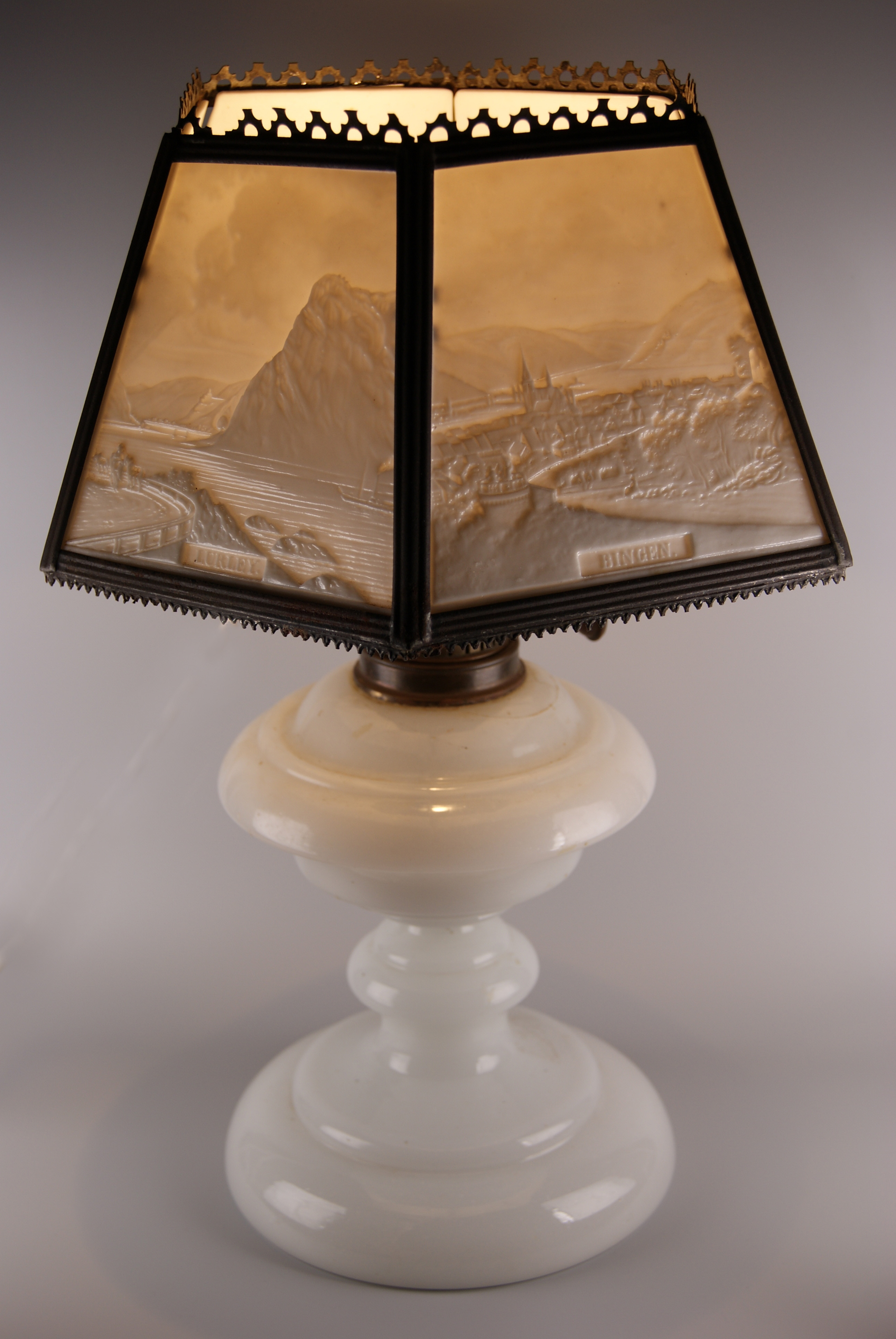
German, set in metal lampshade

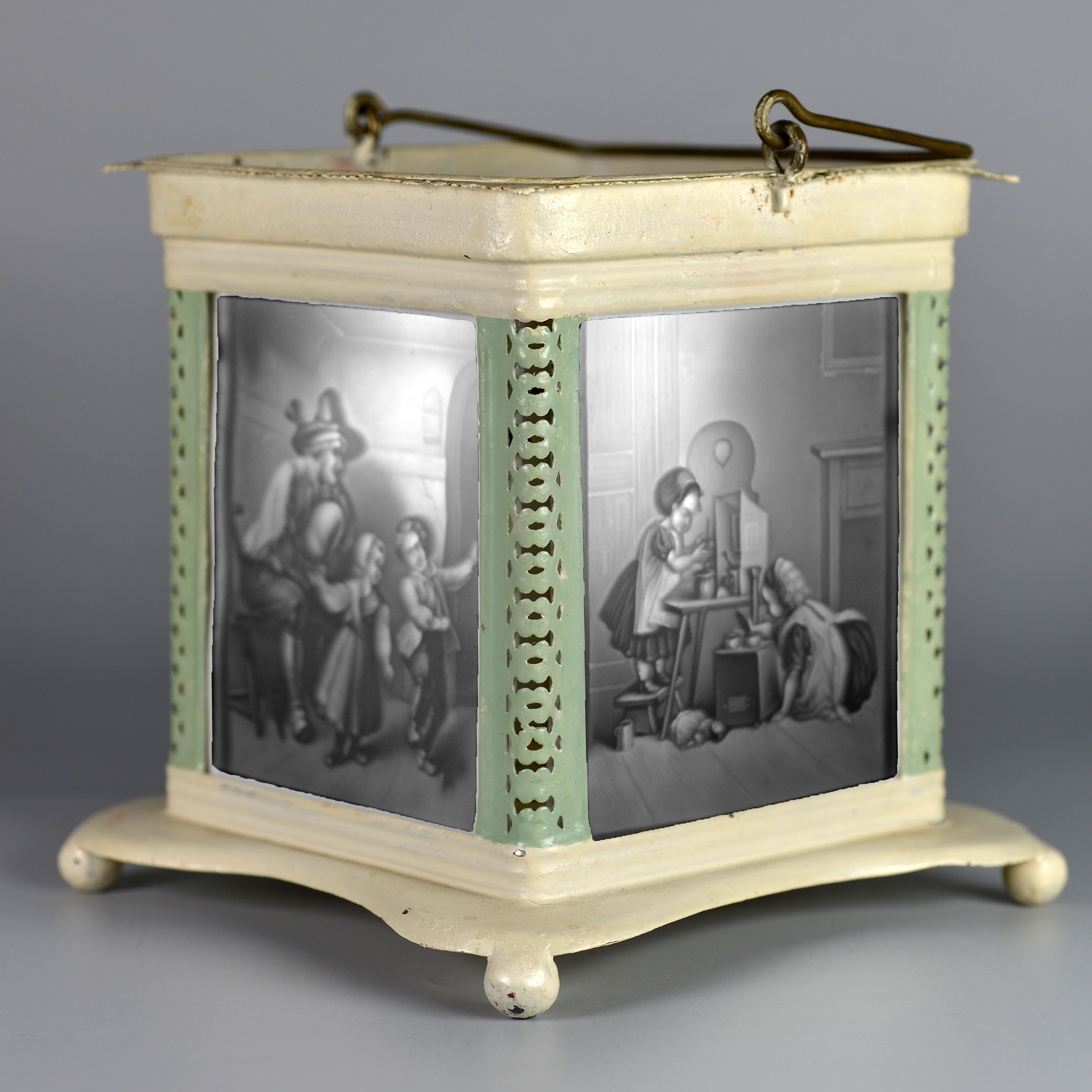
Teapot warmer, or nightlight

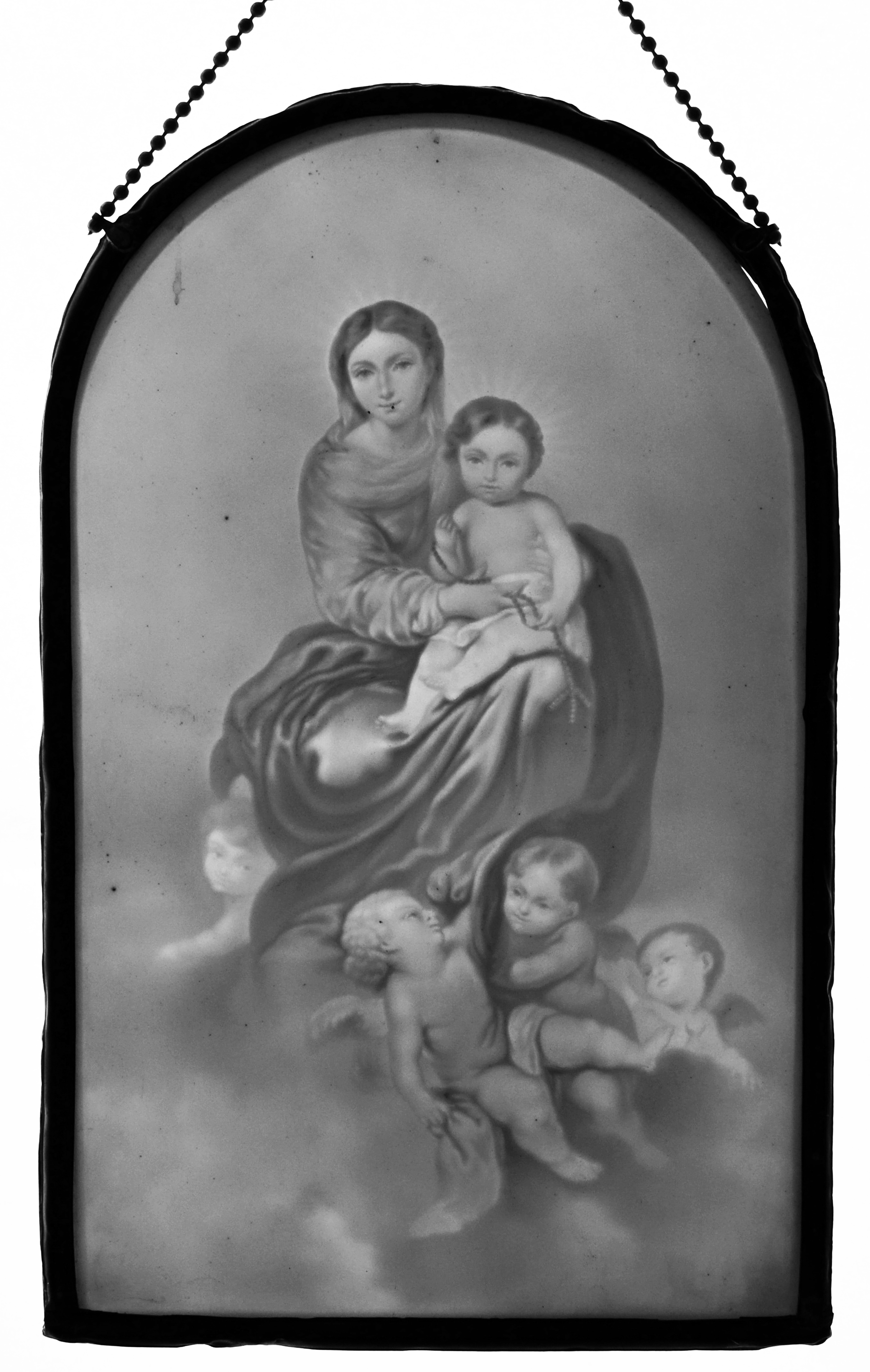
Madonna and Child after Murillo, with suspension chain

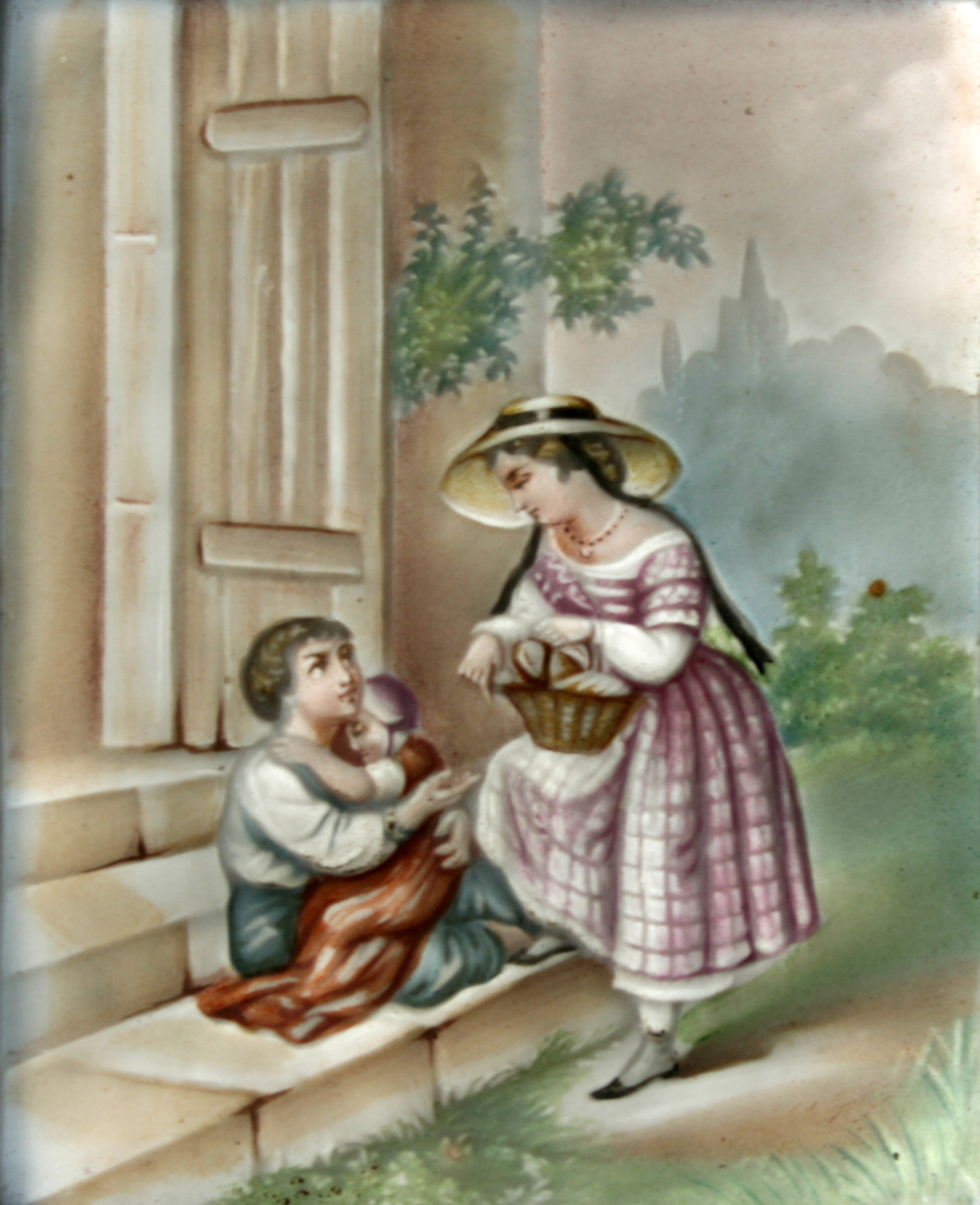
German scene with painted colour

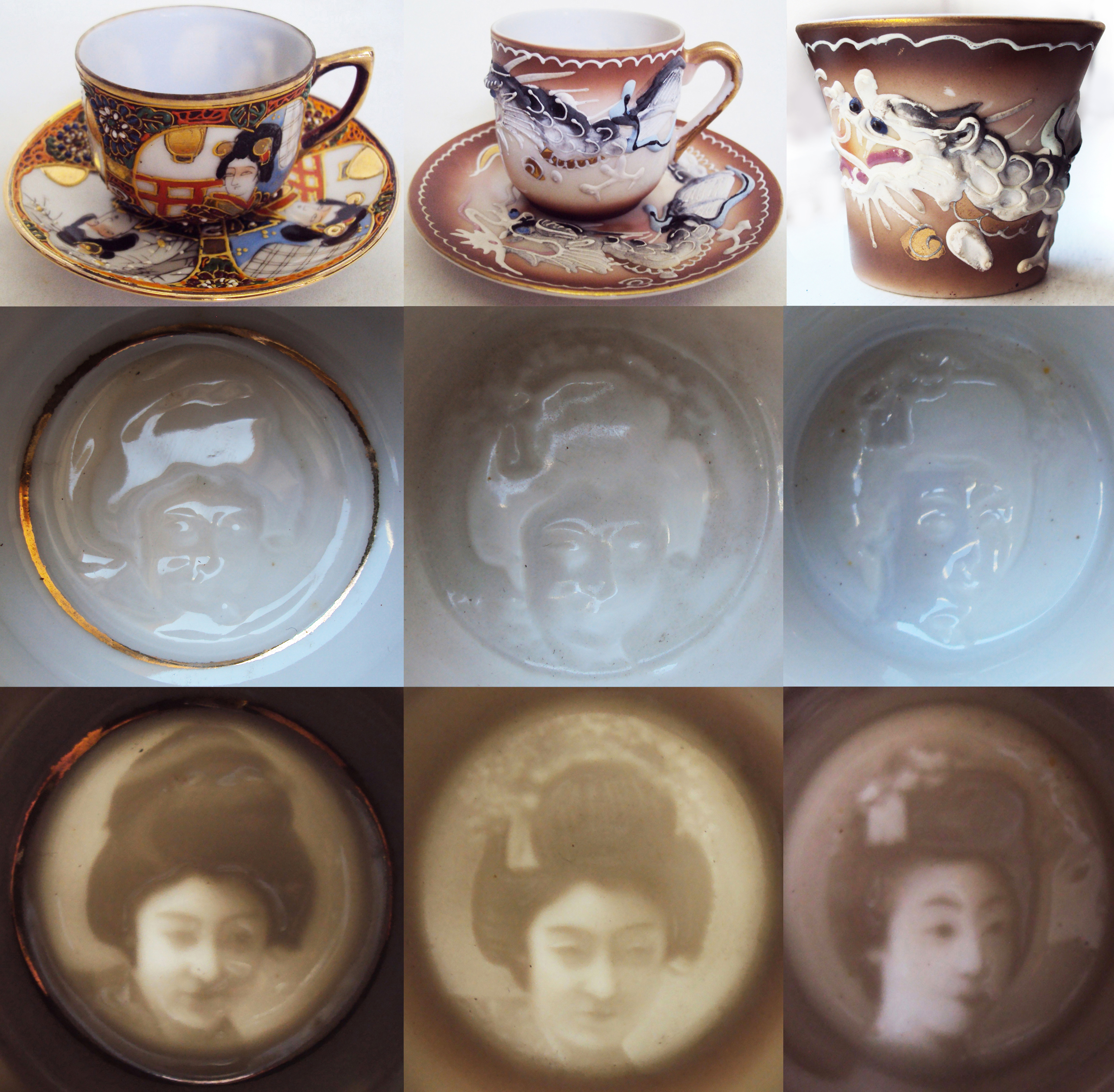
20th-century Japanese cups, with lithophane faces of geishas

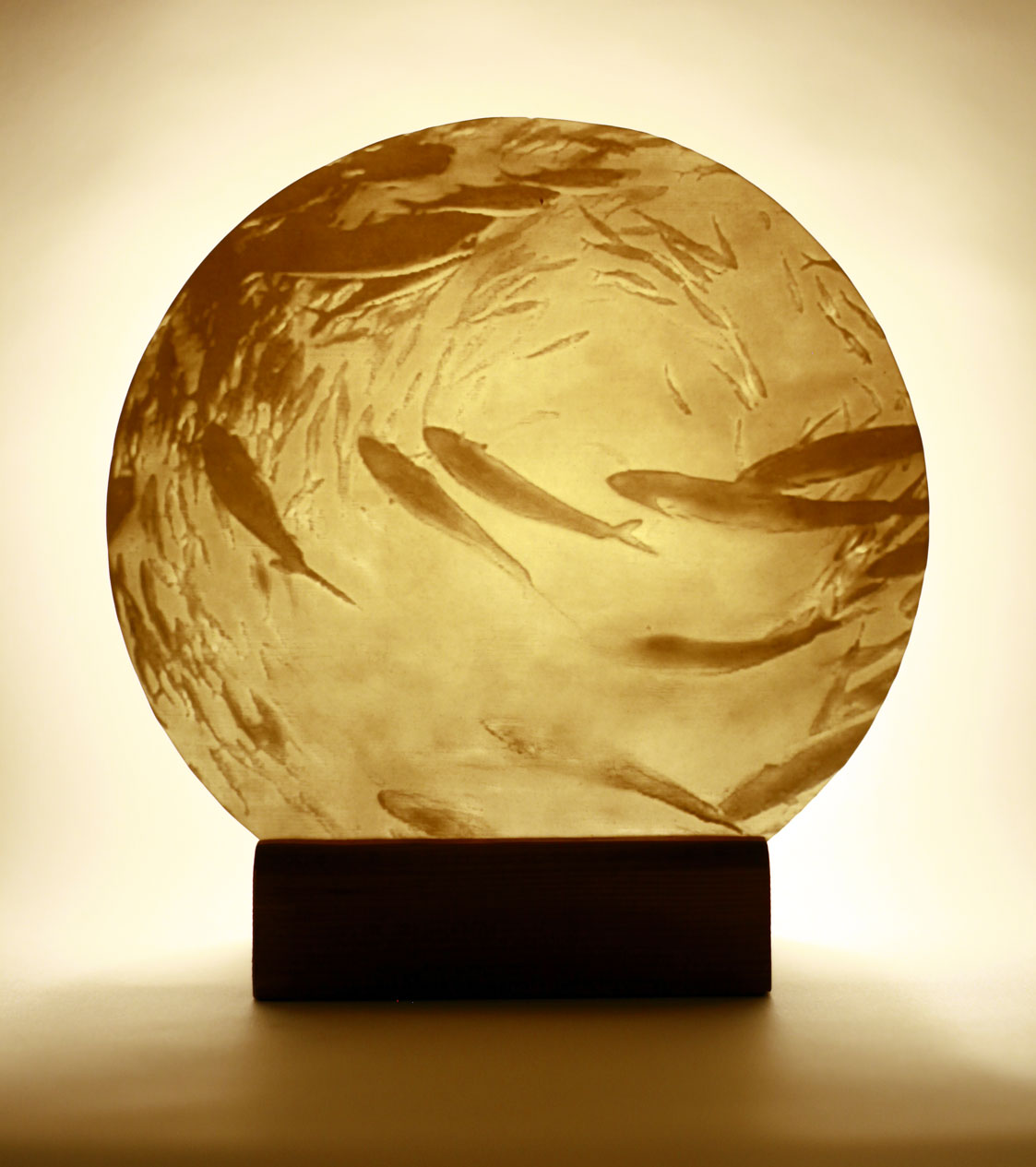
Modern porcelain lithophane on stand

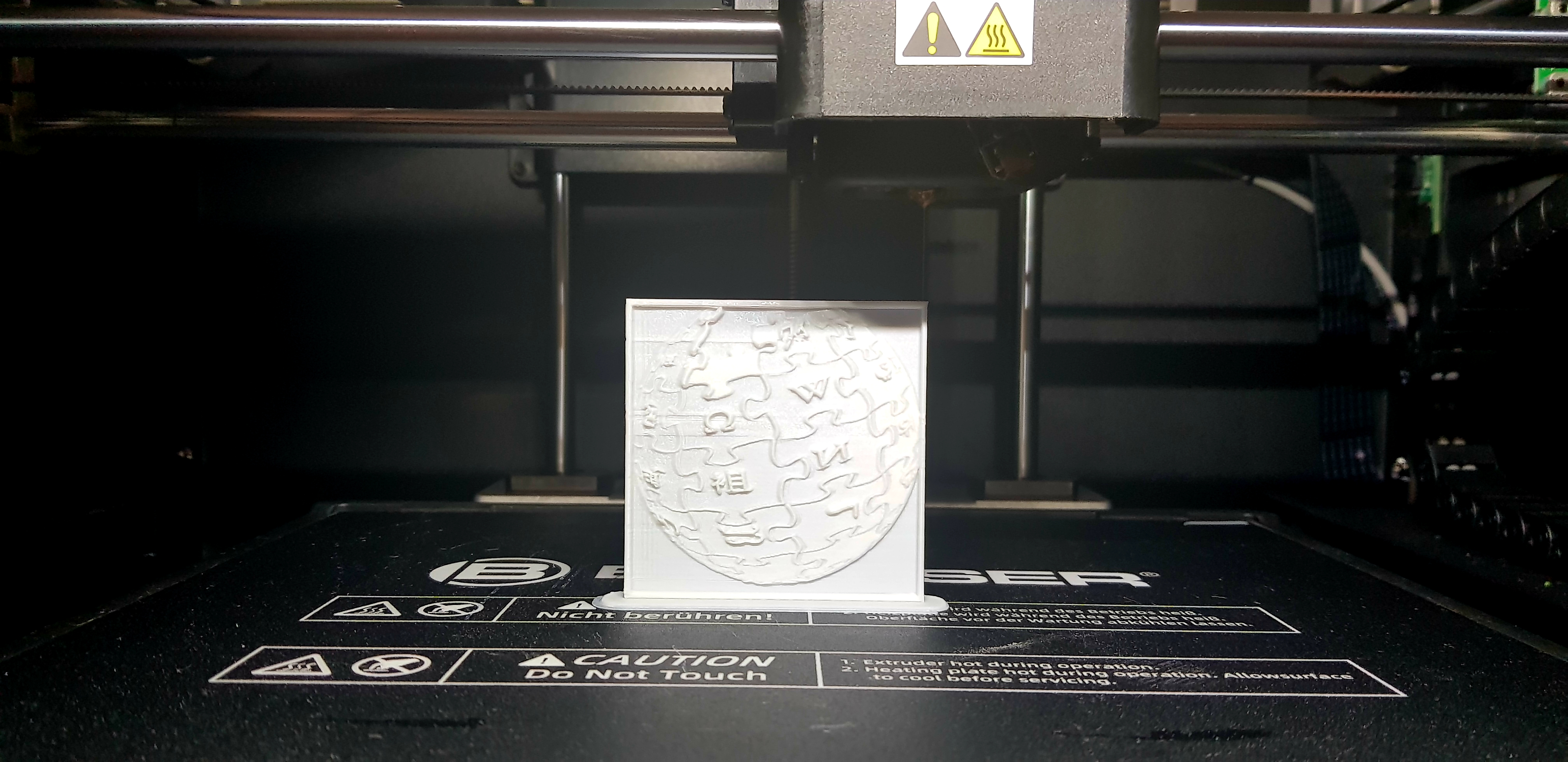
3D printed Wikipedia logo

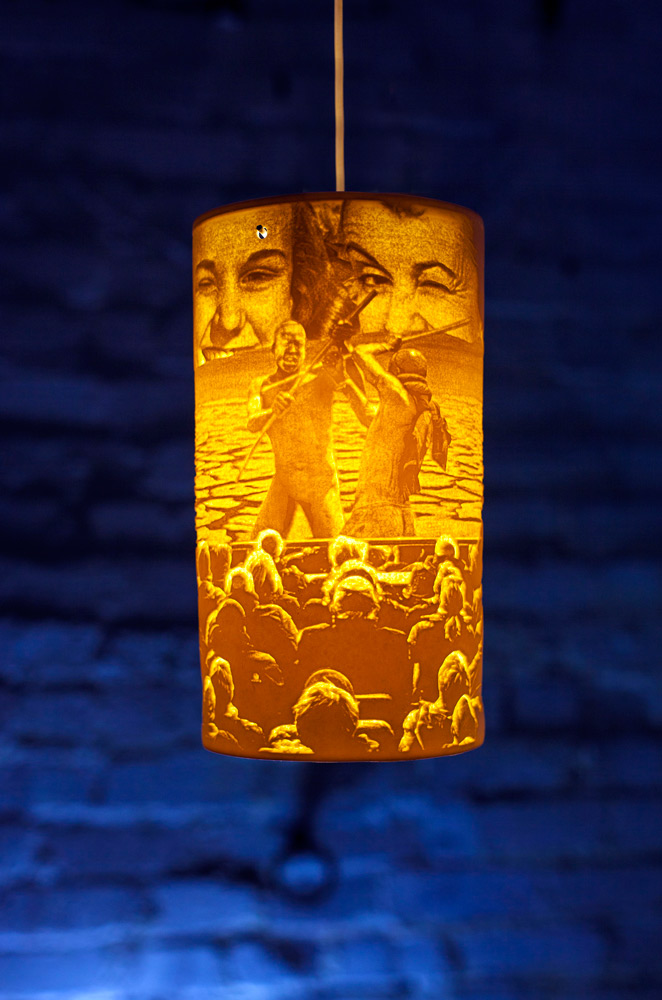
Modern porcelain lampshade, lit from inside

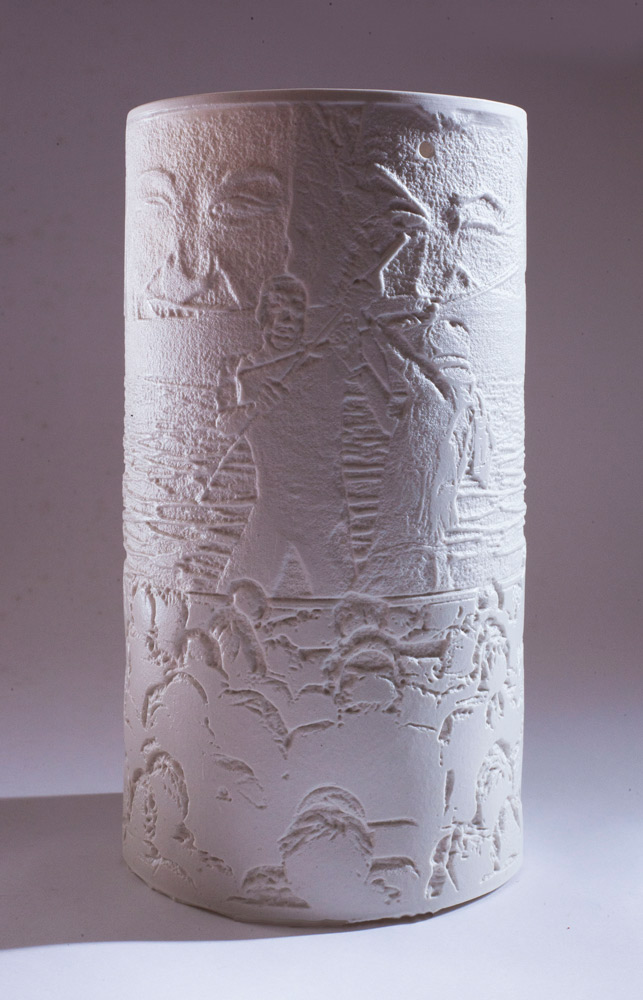
The same porcelain lampshade, in ambient light

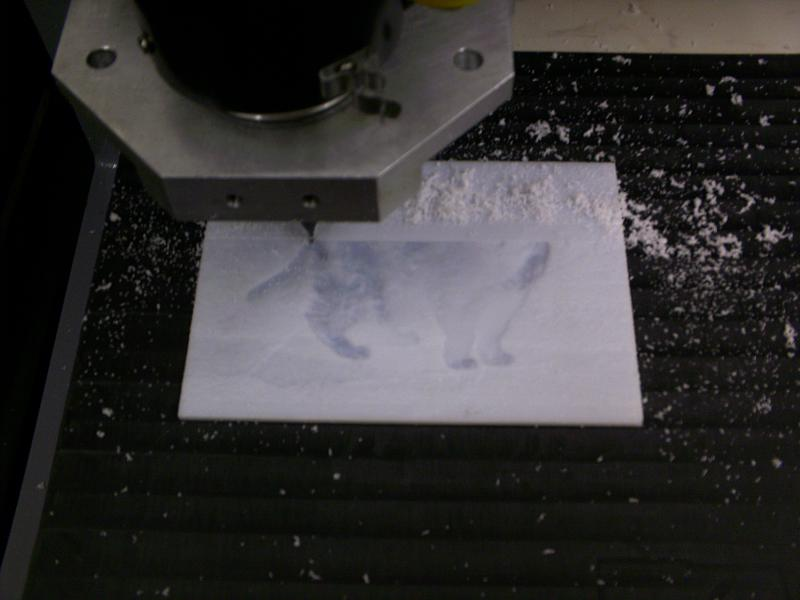
CNC machine cutting lithophane of a cat
