= Véronique Buat =

French astrophysicist (born 1962)

- Born: September 20, 1962 (age 63); Marseille, France
- Education: École normale supérieure Paris-Saclay; Paris Diderot University
- Awards: Chevalier (Knight) of the Legion of Honour
- Scientific career
- Fields: Astrophysics
- Workplaces: Aix-Marseille University
- Doctoral advisor: Jean-Michel Deharveng

Véronique Buat (born September 20, 1962 in Marseille, France) is a French astrophysicist and academic at the University of Provence. Her research interests include galaxy formation and evolution, star formation, infrared astronomy, and ultraviolet astronomy.

== Biography ==
Buat attended École normale supérieure Paris-Saclay from 1982 to 1986, after which she did her Master of Advanced Studies in astrophysics at the Paris Observatory. She wrote her PhD thesis, entitled Ultraviolet emission of spiral and irregular galaxies. Interpretation in terms of star formation at the Paris Diderot University under the supervision of Jean-Michel Deharveng in 1989.

In 2003, Buat was appointed professor at the Aix-Marseille University, before which she worked at the university as an assistant professor. She became a member of the Institut Universitaire de France in 2018. She is also a member of the Laboratoire d'astrophysique de Marseille.

Buat has been involved in the Herschel/HerMES and GOODS-Herschel projects at the Herschel Space Observatory, and the fitting of spectral energy distributions at the CIGALE project. She is furthermore a project scientist of the HeDaM database, and the institute leader of the HELP project.

During her career, Buat has taught optics, thermodynamics, mechanics, history of science, and astrophysics.
