= Bernard de Chalvron =

French diplomat

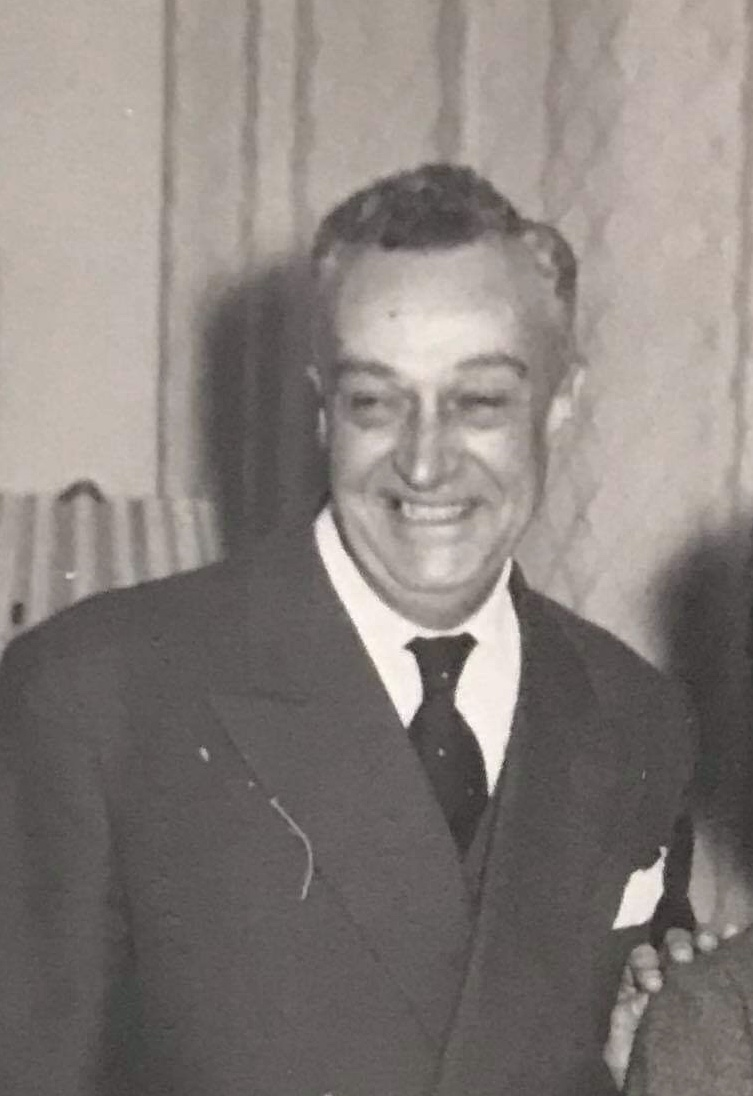
Bernard de Chalvron in 1970

Bernard de Chalvron (Bernard Guillier de Chalvron) was a French diplomat, political advisor, and member of the French Resistance during World War II.

== Career ==
Bernard de Chalvon was a diplomat. He had royalist tendencies.

In the early 1940s, he served as a political advisor on French Algeria to Marshal Philippe Pétain. He was later replaced by Jacques Tiné.

In 1942, he joined the Noyautage des administrations publiques of the French Resistance. After its founder, Claude Bourdet, was arrested, de Chalvron served as its President. He gave copies of reports of meetings conducted by the Vichy government to the United States embassy in Paris, including information about the treatment of Jews. He was arrested and deported to the Buchenwald concentration camp in May 1944. He was liberated by the Americans in 1945.

== Personal life ==
His son, Alain de Chalvron, is a political journalist.
