= Olivier Guyotjeannin =

French medievalist and diplomatist

Olivier Guyotjeannin (born 13 March 1959, Suresnes) is a French medievalist and diplomatist.

== Career ==
Olivier Guyotjeannin graduated as archivist-paleographer from the École Nationale des Chartes in 1981 with a thesis entitled La seigneurie des évêques de Beauvais et de Noyon (Xe-début du XIIIe) which earned him first place of his class. He was a member of the École française de Rome (1983–1986).

First a curator of archives in Saint-Pierre-et-Miquelon, he was later appointed at the Archives nationales in Paris.

In 1989, succeeding Robert-Henri Bautier, he was elected at the chair of institutions, archives and diplomatics of Middle Ages at the École des Chartes where he also taught medieval Latin.

== Works ==
- 1986: Saint-Pierre-et-Miquelon, Paris, L’Harmattan
- 1987: Episcopus et comes : affirmation et déclin de la seigneurie épiscopale au nord du royaume de France : Beauvais-Noyon, Xe-début XIIIe, Geneva: Librairie Droz, (Mémoire et documents de l’École des chartes)
- 1992: Archives de l'Occident. Tome 1er, Le Moyen âge (éd.), Paris, Fayard
- 1993: Les Cartulaires : actes de la Table ronde organisée par l'École nationale des chartes et le GDR 121 du CNRS, Paris, 5–7 December 1991, Geneva : Droz (Mémoire et documents de l’École des chartes) (coll.)
- 1994: Diplomatique médiévale, with vec Pycke et Tock, Turnhout, Brepols
- 1995: Salimbene de Adam : un chroniqueur franciscain, Turnhout : Brepols
- 1996: Autour de Gerbert d'Aurillac, le pape de l'an mil : album de documents commentés, Paris, École des chartes (with Emmanuel Poulle)
- 1996: Clovis chez les historiens, Geneva, Librairie Droz (dir.)
- 1998: Les Sources de l'histoire médiévale, Paris, Le Livre de Poche
- 2000: Le Chartrier de l'abbaye prémontrée de Saint-Yved de Braine (1134-1250), Paris : École des chartes (éd.; dir.)
- 2001: Conseils pour l'édition des textes médiévaux, fasc. 1-2, Paris : CTHS (coord.)
- 2002: Terriers et plans-terriers du XIIIe au XVIIIe, actes du colloque de Paris, 23-25 septembre 1998, Paris, Rennes, Geneva (codir.)
- 2002: Histoire de la France politique, Tome 1 : Le Moyen Age : Le roi, l'Église, les grands, le peuple 481-1514, with Philippe Contamine and Régine Le Jan, Paris, Éditions du Seuil
- 2003: La Langue des actes : actes du XIe Congrès international de diplomatique (Troyes, Thursday 11-Saturday 13 September 2003), Read online
- 2005: Atlas de l'histoire de France, La France médiévale, IXe-XVe siècle, Autrement, Paris (coll.) ISBN 978-2-7467-0727-6 102 p.
- 2005: Le Formulaire d'Odart Morchesne, Paris, École des chartes (éd.; en coll.)
