= Paul-Charles-Amable de Bourgoing =

French diplomat

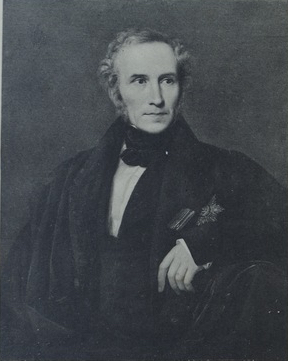

Paul-Charles-Amable de Bourgoing (1791–1864) was a French diplomat credited with inventing the process "email ombrant" (pottery decorating) of lithophanes in 1827 in France.
