= Jean Baptiste Colbert, Marquis of Torcy =

French diplomat (1665–1746)

Jean Baptiste Colbert
- Marquis of Torcy
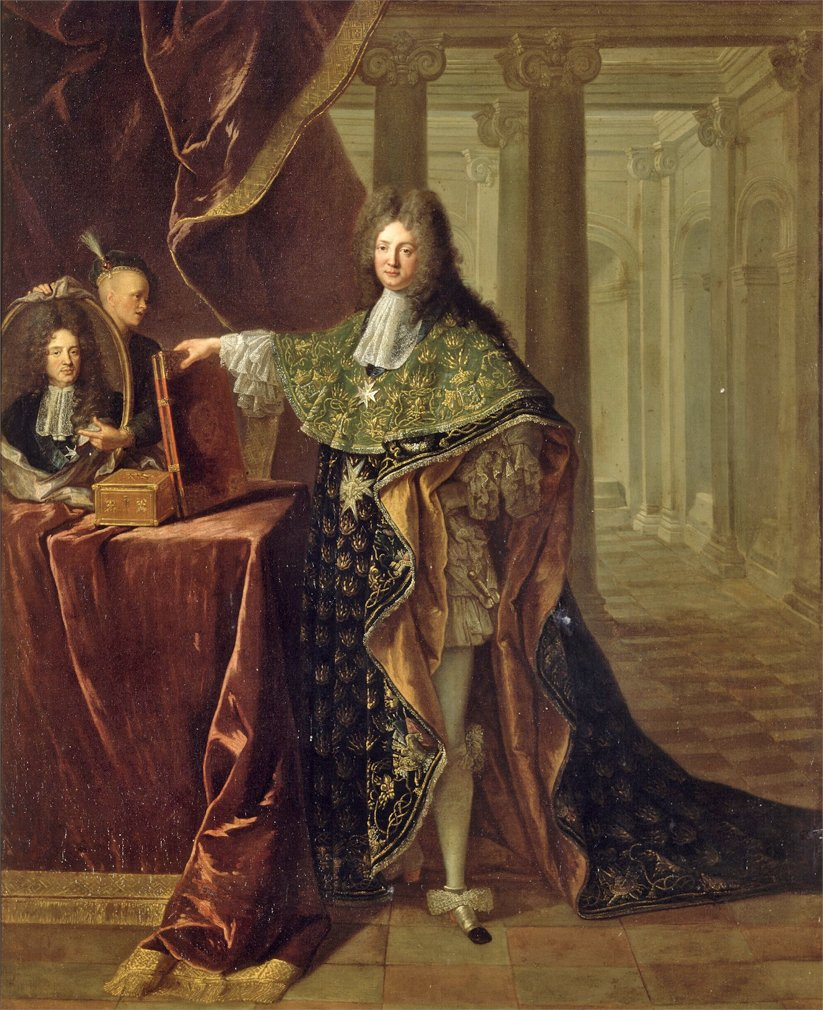
- Portrait by François de Troy, between 1701 and 1706.
- Full name: Jean Baptiste Colbert
- Born: 14 September 1665; Paris, France
- Died: 2 septembre 1746 (aged 80); Chaillot, Paris, France
- Noble family: Colbert family
- Spouse: Catherine Félicité Arnauld (1696)
- Issue: Jean Baptiste Joachim, Marquis of Croissy
- Father: Charles Colbert, Marquis of Croissy
- Mother: Marguerite Béraud

Jean Baptiste Colbert, Marquis of Torcy (14 September 1665 – 2 September 1746), generally called Colbert de Torcy, was a French diplomat, who negotiated some of the most important treaties towards the end of Louis XIV's reign, notably the treaty (1700) that occasioned the War of the Spanish Succession (1701–1714), in which the dying Charles II of Spain named Louis XIV's grandson, Philippe of France, Duke of Anjou, heir to the Spanish throne, eventually founding the line of Bourbons of Spain.

== Biography ==
Born in Paris, the son of Charles Colbert, Louis's minister of foreign affairs and the nephew of Jean-Baptiste Colbert, Louis' chief advisor, for whom the Torcy title was created, Colbert de Torcy was a brilliant and precocious legal student. As a very young man, he assisted his father in sensitive diplomatic missions. Colbert de Torcy proved himself so able that in 1689, Louis XIV granted him the right to succeed to his father's position as minister of foreign affairs, a position he fulfilled from 28 July 1696 to 23 September 1715.

He was the guiding spirit of French diplomacy at the series of international conferences that resulted in the Treaty of Utrecht (1713) and the Treaty of Rastatt (1714) and was concerned with professionalizing the conduct of diplomacy. He instituted an académie politique to train young professionals in the equivalent of a foreign service bureaucracy: it did not survive his retirement, but his establishment at Versailles of a centralized diplomatic archive (1710) has been a service to historians. Louis XIV was his foreign relation.

The aged king, recognizing that Colbert de Torcy had been a de facto secretary of state, named him such in his will, but when Louis died in 1715, his will was broken; the Regent, Philippe, Duke of Orléans deprived Colbert de Torcy of any political power, and he settled into a long retirement, during which he was a member of the unofficial political salon called the Entresol, which formed in the early years of Louis XV's maturity when the abbé Alary, a protégé of Fleury, convened an occasional political discussion group in the entresol of his apartment in Place Vendôme. There in sociable surroundings, sharing the gossip and news Colbert de Torcy debated contemporary events in a sympathetic circle and like others, doubtless read aloud and elicited comment upon the political writings.

The architect Germain Boffrand had built a series of hôtels particuliers in the new district, the Faubourg Saint-Honoré, and Colbert de Torcy purchased one as a semi-finished shell, 14 November 1715, which he finished as a suitable Paris residence, the hôtel de Torcy (later the hôtel de Beauharnais, now the German Embassy 78, rue de Lille). There his installation among his tapestries, furnishings, paintings, Chinese porcelains mounted in gilt-bronze, sculptures, and other works of art above all in his cabinet doré, giving onto the salon that was lit from both sides, provided him solace and comfort in a long and productive retirement, in which he completed his Mémoirs pour servir à l'histoire des négotiations depuis le Traité de Riswick jusqu'à la Paix d'Utrecht, published in 1756.

Colbert de Torcy died at Paris in 1746. His official portrait was painted by Hyacinthe Rigaud. Colbert de Torcy is commemorated in the rue de Torcy, Paris XVIIIème.

Political offices
| Preceded by Charles Colbert, marquis de Croissy | Minister of Foreign Affairs; 28 July 1696 – 22 September 1715 | Succeeded by Nicolas du Blé, marquis d'Huxelles |
