= Louis-Gabriel Du Buat-Nançay =

Louis-Gabriel Du Buat-Nançay (French pronunciation: [lwi ɡabʁijɛl dy bɥa nɑ̃sɛ]; 2 March 1732, Tortisambert near Livarot – 18 September 1787, Nançay) was an 18th-century French playwright, historian and political writer.

Born in a noble family of Normandy, Du Buat-Nançay began his diplomatic career as an aide to Hubert de Folard (1709–1803), French ambassador to the Holy Roman Empire. He later became Minister of France in Dresden and Regensburg, then settled in Germany where he married; he spent his last years on his estate in Berry .

== Main publications ==
- 1757: Les Origines, ou l’Ancien gouvernement de la France, de l’Allemagne, de l’Italie, etc., The Hague, 4 vol. in- 12; 1789, 3 vol. in-8°
- 1772: Histoire ancienne des peuples de l’Europe, Paris, Suard et Arnaud, 12 vol. in-12°;
- 1773: Éléments de la politique, ou Recherche des vrais principes de l'économie sociale, 6 vol. in-8°;
- 1778: les Maximes du gouvernement monarchique, 4 vol. in-8°, (against the book by Mey, Maultrot, Aubry).
- 1785: Lettre d’un anti-philosophe de province aux philosophes de la capitale.
- 1785: Remarques d'un Français; ou, Examen impartial du livre de M. Necker sur l'administration des finances de France, pour servir de correctif et de supplément à son ouvrage

He translated the Tableau du gouvernement actuel de l'Allemagne, ou Abrégé du droit public de l'Empire traduit de l'allemand, avec des notes historiques et critiques, par M***, Paris, veuve Bordelet, 1755, in-12°, by Johann Jakob Schmauss.

== Sources ==
- François-Xavier de Feller, Dictionnaire historique; ou, Histoire abrégée des hommes qui se sont fait un nom, t. 4, Paris, Houdaille, 1836, (p. 225).
