= Charles Colbert, Marquis of Croissy =

French statesman (1625–1696)

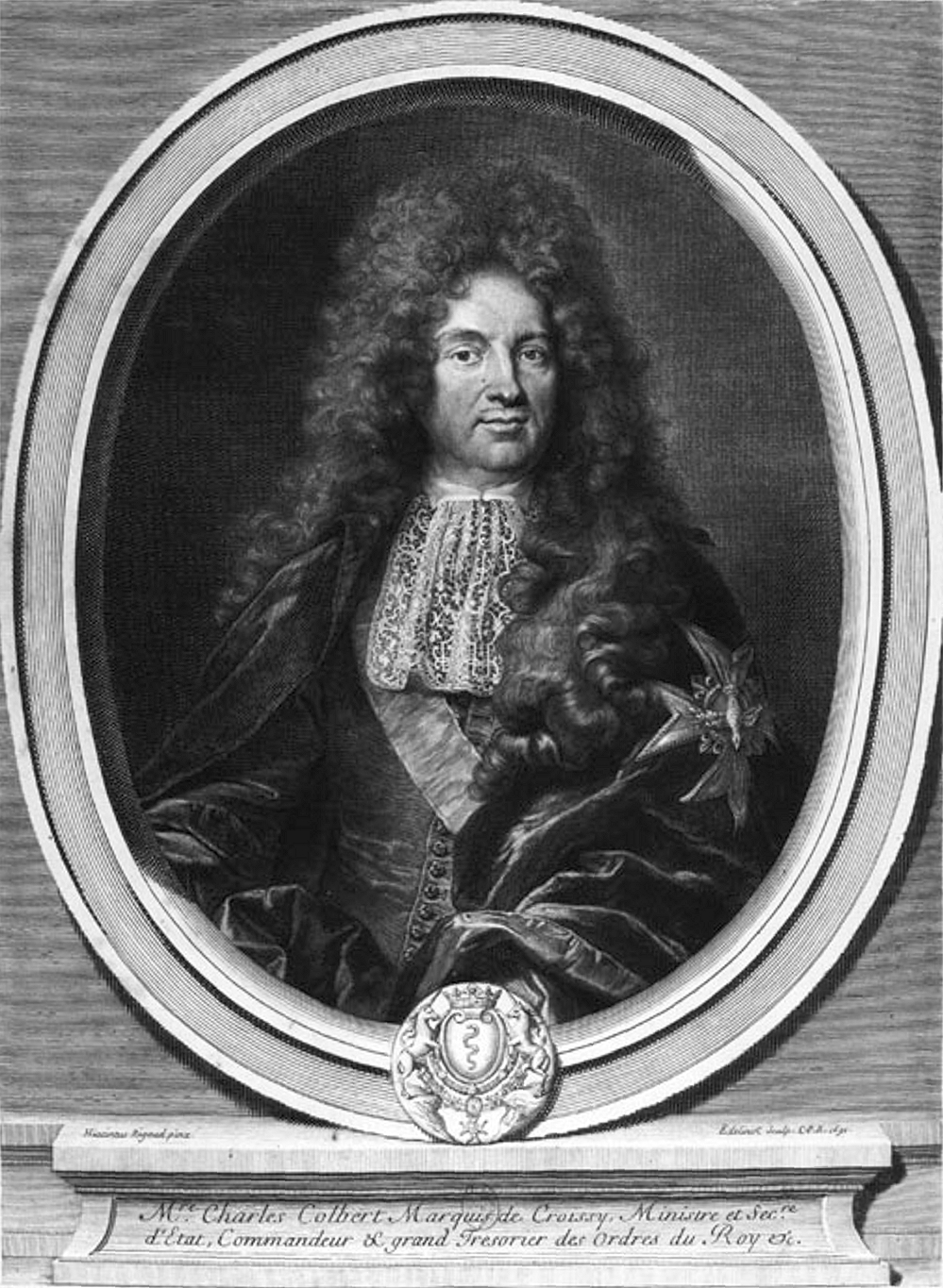
Charles Colbert, Marquis of Croissy.

Charles Colbert, Marquis of Croissy (1625 – 28 July 1696) was a French statesman and diplomat.

== Biography ==
Colbert was born in Reims. Like his elder brother Jean-Baptiste Colbert, he began his career in the office of the minister of war Le Tellier.

In 1656 he bought a counsellorship at the parlement of Metz, and in 1658 was appointed intendant of Alsace and president of the newly created sovereign council of Alsace. In this position he had to re-organise the territory recently annexed to France. The steady support of his brother at court gained for him several diplomatic missions to Germany and Italy (1659–1661). In 1662 he became marquis de Croissy and président à mortier of the parlement of Metz.

After various intendancies, at Soissons (1665), at Amiens (1666), and at Paris (1667), he turned to diplomacy for good. In 1668, he represented France at the conference of Aix-la-Chapelle; and in August of the same year was sent as ambassador to the Court of St. James in London, where he was to negotiate the definitive Treaty of Dover with Charles II of England, (1630-1685). He arranged the interview at Dover on the English Channel between King Charles and his sister Henrietta of Orléans, gained the King's personal favor by finding a mistress for him, Louise de Kéroualle, maid of honour to Madame, and persuaded him to declare the Third Anglo-Dutch War against the Dutch Republic.

The negotiation of the Treaty of Nijmwegen (1676–1678) still further increased his reputation as a diplomat and King Louis XIV, (1638-1715), made him secretary of state for foreign affairs for France after the disgrace of Arnauld de Pomponne, brought about by his brother in 1679. He at once assumed the entire direction of French royal diplomacy. Foreign ambassadors were no longer received and diplomatic instructions were no longer given by other secretaries of state. It was he, not de Louvois, who formed the idea of annexation during a time of peace, by means of the chambers of reunion. He had outlined this plan as early as 1658 with regard to Alsace. His policy at first was to retain the territory annexed by the chambers of reunion without declaring war, and for this purpose he signed treaties of alliance with the elector of Brandenburg (1681), and with Denmark (1683); but the troubles following upon the revocation of the Edict of Nantes (1685) forced him to give up his scheme and to prepare for war with Germany (1688). The negotiations for peace had been begun again when he died at the Palace of Versailles, outside of Paris, on 28 July 1696. His clerk, Bergeret, was his assistant.

== Personal life ==
In 1664, he married Françoise Béraud, daughter of a rich banker, who brought with her the territory of Croissy, which would be turned into a Marquisate in July 1676. They had seven children:

1. Jean Baptiste Colbert, Marquis of Torcy (1665–1746), succeeded him as Minister of Foreign Affairs.
2. Charles Joachim Colbert (1667–1738), Bishop of Montpellier.
3. Marie-Françoise (1671–1724), married the Marquis of Bouzols.
4. Louis-François Henri Colbert, Count of Croissy (1676–1747), military and diplomat.
5. Charlotte Colbert (1678–1765), abbess of the Maubuisson Abbey.
6. Marguerite Thérèse Colbert (1682–1769), married the Marquis de Reynal and later the Duke of Saint-Pierre.
7. Olympe Sophie Colbert (1686–1705), did not marry.

Political offices
| Preceded by Simon Arnauld, Marquis de Pomponne | Minister of Foreign Affairs; 12 February 1680 – 28 July 1696 | Succeeded by Jean Baptiste Colbert, Marquis of Torcy |
