= List of ambassadors of France =

Lists of ambassadors of France may refer to:

- List of ambassadors of France to Algeria
- List of ambassadors of France to Australia
- List of ambassadors of France to Austria
- List of ambassadors of France to Belgium
- List of ambassadors of France to Canada
- List of ambassadors of France to England
- List of ambassadors of France to Germany
- List of ambassadors of France to Greece
- List of ambassadors of France to Guatemala
- List of ambassadors of France to Italy
- List of ambassadors of France to Israel
- List of ambassadors of France to Japan
- List of ambassadors of France to Lebanon
- List of ambassadors of France to Poland
- List of ambassadors of France to Russia
- List of ambassadors of France to South Korea
- List of ambassadors of France to Sweden
- List of ambassadors of France to the Kingdom of Great Britain
- List of ambassadors of France to the United Kingdom
- List of ambassadors of France to the United States
