= Adrien Thierry =

French lawyer and diplomat

French Ambassador to Romania
- In office 1936–1940
- Preceded by: André d'Ormesson
- Succeeded by: Jacques Truelle

Personal details
- Born: Adrien Joseph Marie Hilaire Thierry; 4 January 1885 Marseille, Bouches-du-Rhône
- Died: 26 January 1961 (aged 76) Neuilly-sur-Seine, Île-de-France
- Spouse: Nadine de Rothschild (m. 1919; died 1959)
- Children: 3
- Parent: Joseph Thierry (father)
- Education: École des sciences politiques

Adrien Joseph Marie Hilaire Thierry (4 January 1885 – 26 January 1961) was a French lawyer and diplomat.

== Early life ==
Thierry was born on 4 January 1885 in Marseille, Bouches-du-Rhône in the Provence-Alpes-Côte d'Azur of France. He was a son of Joseph Thierry (1857–1918), a diplomat who served as Minister of Public Works, then Minister of Finance.

His paternal grandparents were Catherine (née Berbach) Thierry and Joseph Marie Philippe Thierry, who was the last French mayor of Haguenau before the Franco-Prussian War of 1870, after which Haguenau was ceded to the German Empire and his family was expelled by the Germans, taking refuge in Marseille.

== Career ==
After he graduated with a law degree from the École des sciences politiques, he began his career as diplomat with the French Ministry for Foreign Affairs. He first served as embassy attaché in the minister's office in June 1910 before transferring to the French Embassy at London in March 1911. By the time of his 1919 wedding, he was counselor of the Embassy there, eventually spending a total of years seventeen years with the London Embassy and was said to have developed a "genuine fondness for Britain".

From until 1938, he served as the French Envoy to Greece. From 1936 to 1940, he served as the French Ambassador to Romania in Bucharest, succeeding André d'Ormesson.

In June 1940, he was among a caravan of automobiles fleeing to Spain, which included Empress Zita, her brother Prince Francisco and sister Princess Isabel, Charlotte, Grand Duchess of Luxembourg (who was married to the Empress's brother, Prince Felix), Elisabeth, Philippine and Eugène von Rothschild, and the Polish pianist Stanislas Niedzielski.

He later served on the Central Commission for Navigation on the Rhine until his death in 1961, after which he was succeeded by Jacques Fouques-Duparc.

== Personal life ==
On 7 August 1919, Thierry was married to Baroness Nadine Charlotte Thérèse Jeanne Mathilde de Rothschild (1898–1958), the only daughter of Baron Henri de Rothschild. She continued her father's philanthropic works with the French Hospital, and, upon his 1947 death, inherited a number of his paintings, including by Jean Siméon Chardin. Her younger brother, Philippe de Rothschild, was the father of Philippine de Rothschild, who inherited the family's French winery Château Mouton Rothschild. Together, they were the parents of three children, including:

- Jacques Thierry (1921–2015), who became president of the Banque Lambert in 1975; he married Jacqueline-Lucie Réville in 1946.

His wife Nadine died at Villa Sansovino, her home in Cannes, on 22 October 1958. La Sansovino, as it is sometimes referred to, had previously been the residence of Lord Derby, the British Ambassador to France, and was later owned by Prince Charles, Count of Flanders. Thierry died in Neuilly-sur-Seine on 26 January 1961, and was buried alongside his wife at Cimetière du Grand Jas in Cannes.
