= Marc Fonbaustier =

French diplomat

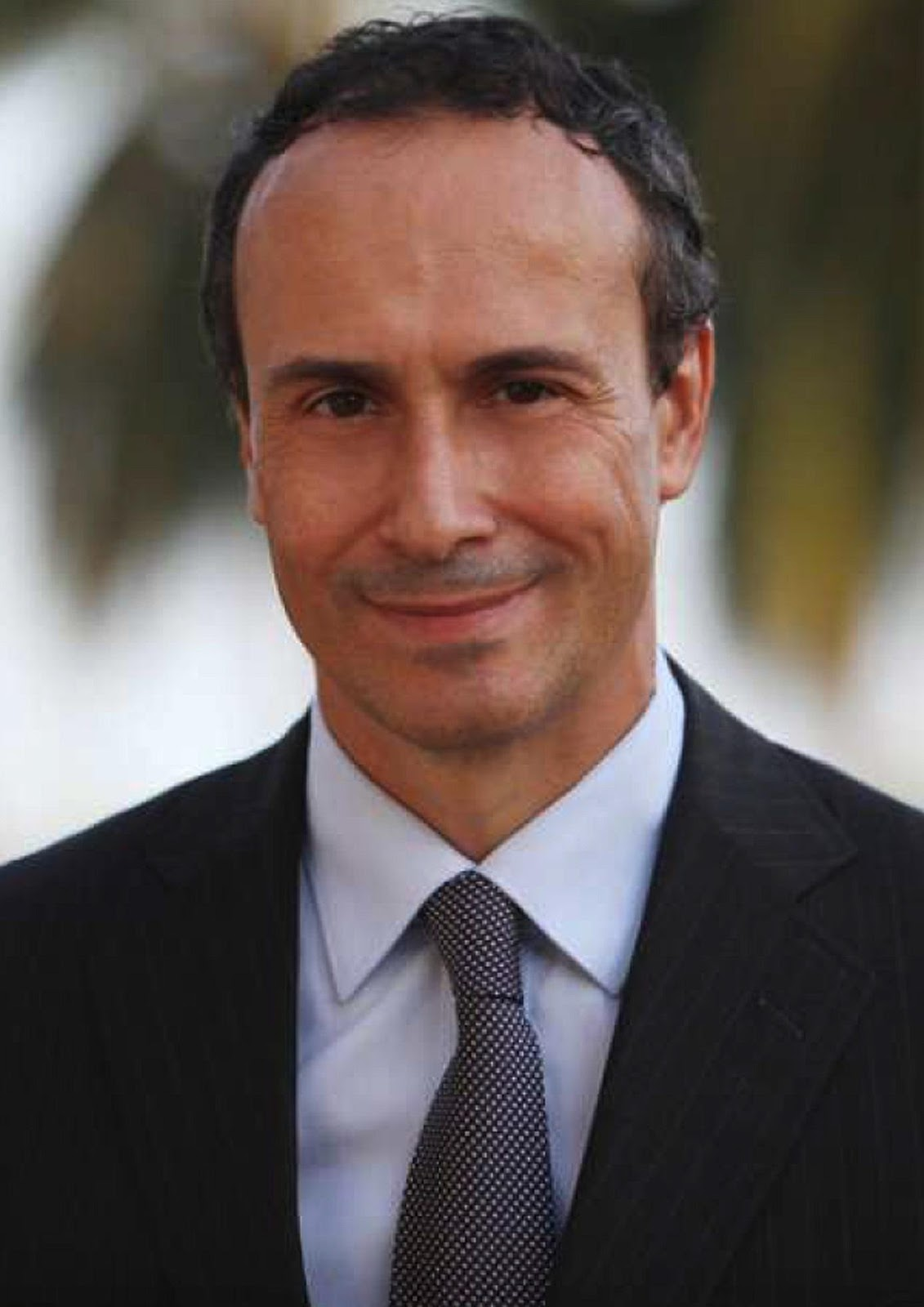

17th France Ambassador to Togo
- In office September 3, 2014 – July 31, 2017
- Preceded by: Nicolas Warnery
- Succeeded by: Marc Vizy

Personal details
- Born: June 30, 1964 Saint-Vallier, France
- Education: Sciences Po; École nationale d'administration

Marc Fonbaustier (born 30 June 1964 in Saint-Vallier, France) is a French diplomat, Deputy Managing Director of Agence de Coopération Médias (subsidiary of France Médias Monde) since September 2017, France Ambassador to Togo from 2014 to 2017, and General Consul of France to Hong-Kong and Macau from 2009 to 2010.

== Biography ==
=== Education ===
Marc Fonbaustier attended the Lycée Henri-IV. He graduated from Sciences Po in 1985 with a major in Civil service. In 1986, he studied financial markets management, future markets and commodities markets at the Paris Dauphine University. He passed the admission tests of the École nationale d'administration in 1988, and started his curriculum after his two-year civil service at the École spéciale militaire de Saint-Cyr. Marc Fonbaustier graduated from the École nationale d'administration within the Condorcet promotion (1992).

=== European affairs ===
Marc Fonbaustier started at the Ministry of European and Foreign Affairs as a scribe for the Legal Affairs Department, in charge of issues such as nuclear energy, outer-space affairs, the Channel tunnel and other trans-boundaries issues. In 1996, he was nominated a national expert of the French Ministry of Foreign Affairs in position at the European Commission. In 1999, he was appointed Counsellor at the French Permanent Representation to the EU, in charge of relations with the European Parliament.

=== Diplomatic representation ===
In 2001, Marc Fonbaustier was appointed political counsellor at the French embassy in Rome, Italy. In 2006, he was nominated Minister Counsellor at the French embassy in India.

In 2009, he was nominated Consul general of France in Hong-Kong and Macau. He was expelled from the Hong Kong Country Club in 2010 for stealing two bottles of wine. In 2011, he became Head of the "Situation Center" at the Crisis management department of the French Ministry of Europe and Foreign Affairs. From 2014 to 2017, Marc Fonbaustier was France Ambassador to Togo.

In 2017, he was named Deputy Managing Director of Agence de Coopération Médias (subsidiary of France Médias Monde).

== Honours ==
- 2010: Knight of the Ordre national du Mérite

== See also ==
- List of ambassadors of France
- Ministry of Europe and Foreign Affairs
- France Médias Monde
