= Bonnefous =

Bonnefous is a French surname. Notable people with the surname include:

- Édouard Bonnefous (1907–2007), French politician
- Georges Bonnefous (1867–1956), French Republican politician
- Jean-Pierre Bonnefous (1943–2025), French ballet dancer and instructor
- Marc Bonnefous (1924–2002), French diplomat
