= List of ambassadors of France to Israel =

Coordinates: 32°04′55″N 34°46′05″E

This is a list of French ambassadors to Israel

From	To	Ambassador
1949	1952	Édouard-Félix Guyon
1952	1959	Pierre-Eugène Gilbert
1959	1965	Jean Adolphe Bourdeillette
1965	1968	Bertrand Rochereau de La Sablière
1968	1973	Francis Huré
1973	1977	Jean Herly
1977	1982	Marc Bonnefous
1982	1986	Jacques Dupont
1986	1991	Alain Marie Pierret
1991	1993	Jean-Louis Lucet
1993	1995	Pierre Brochand
1995	1999	Jean-Noël de Bouillane de Lacoste
1999	2003	Jacques Huntzinger
2003	2006	Gérard Araud
2006	2009	Jean-Michel Casa
2009	2013	Christophe Bigot
2013	2016	Patrick Maisonnave
2016	2019	Hélène Le Gal
2019	2023	Éric Danon
2023		Frédéric Journès
