= Christophe Bigot =

French diplomat (born 1965)

Ambassador of France to Israel
- In office 2009–2013
- President: Nicolas Sarkozy and François Hollande
- Preceded by: Jean-Michel Casa
- Succeeded by: Patrick Maisonnave

Personal details
- Born: 23 December 1965 (age 60) Neuilly-sur-Seine, France
- Profession: Diplomat

Christophe Bigot (French: [kʁistɔf biɡo]; born December 23, 1965, Neuilly-sur-Seine, France) served as the French ambassador to Israel from 2009 to 2013.

== Career ==
=== Early career ===
Bigot was posted to the French Permanent Mission to the United Nations in New York, 1997–2001, Deputy Director of Southern Africa and Indian Ocean, 2001–2004, First Counselor, Deputy Ambassador in Tel Aviv, 2004–2007, Advisor to the Minister of Foreign and European Affairs, 2007–2009, in charge of North Africa, Near and Middle East.

=== Ambassador to Israel, 2009–2013 ===
Bigot visited Sderot on September 16, 2009, to show solidarity with its residents.

His residence in Jerusalem was in the Talbiya neighborhood.

On Tuesday, April 24, 2012, while hiking alone in the Judean desert near Nabi Musa, Bigot was robbed by two assailants. Bigot complied with their demands and was left stranded though unharmed. He was robbed of his cellphone and wallet.

=== Later career ===
In September 2013, by decision of François Hollande, Bigot was put in charge of the strategy department of the French foreign security agency (DGSE). He was succeeded as ambassador by Patrick Maisonnave.

From june 2025, he is appointed special representative of the European Union for the Middle East peace process.

== Other activities ==
- French Development Agency (AFD), Member of the Supervisory Board
