= Hélène Le Gal =

French diplomat (born 1967)

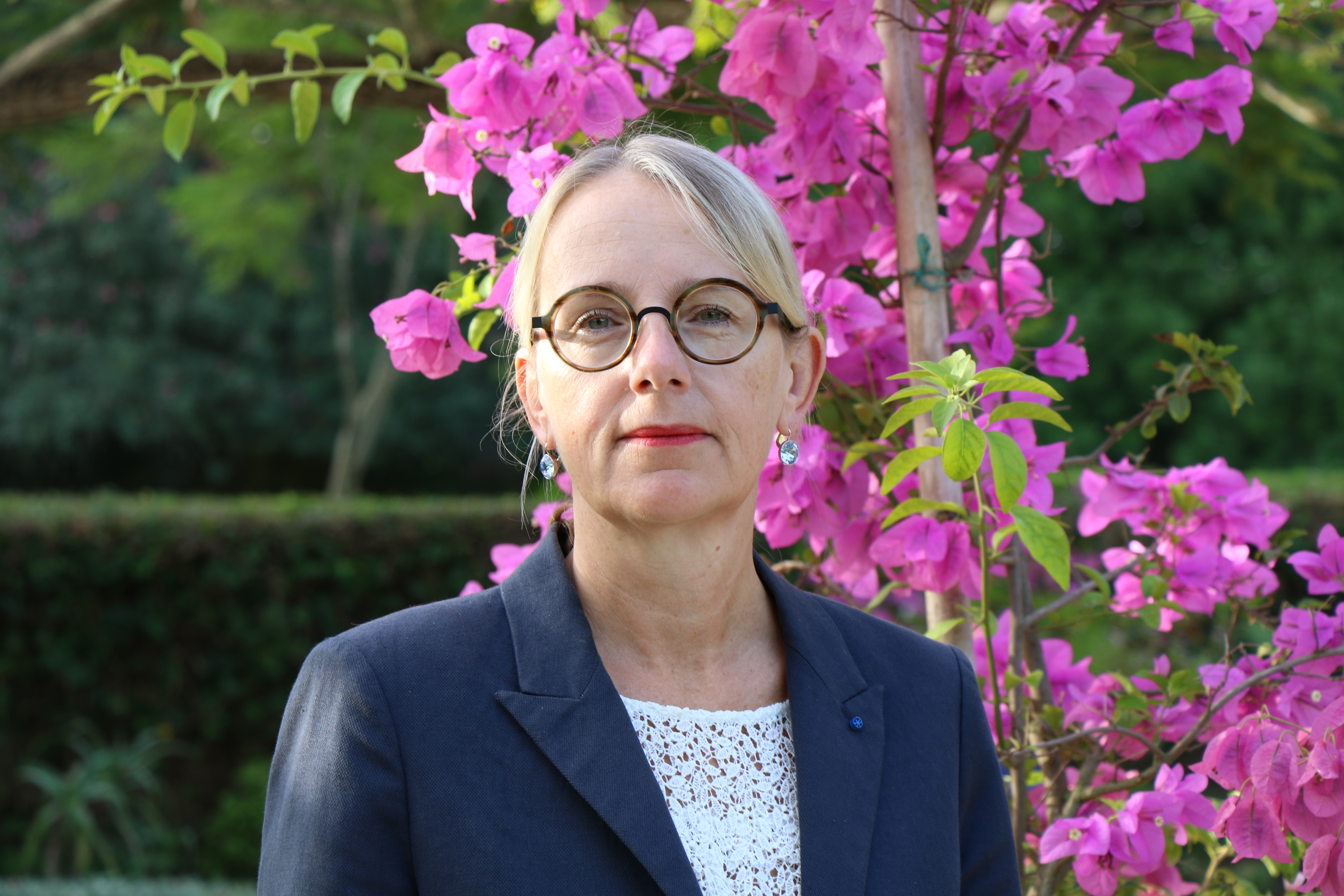
- Hélène Le Gal

French Ambassador to Morocco
- In office 2019–2022
- President: Emmanuel Macron
- Preceded by: Jean-Francois Girault
- Succeeded by: Christophe Lecourtier

Ambassador of France to Israel
- In office 2016–2019
- President: François Hollande and Emmanuel Macron
- Preceded by: Patrick Maisonnave
- Succeeded by: Éric Danon

Personal details
- Born: 21 April 1967 (age 59) Bagneux, France
- Profession: Diplomat

Hélène Le Gal (born 21 April 1967) is a French diplomat. She was the French Ambassador to Israel between 2016 and 2019. She was then the French Ambassador to Morocco from 2019 to 2022.

== Biography ==
In 1987, she graduated from the Paris Institute of Political Studies. She joined the Ministry of Foreign Affairs in 1988, and was immediately sent to Africa, being appointed second secretary at the French Embassy in Burkina Faso. She moved to Paris in 1990, to be assigned to the African Affairs Department. She participated in the humanitarian operations undertaken by France at that time under the Minister of Health and Humanitarian Action Bernard Kouchner. After that, in 1992, she joined the Department of Economic Affairs, where she managed files relating to questions of international debt (Paris Club) and banks of development. She completed her initial training with a diploma from the Center for Advanced Studies on Africa and Modern Asia, which she obtained in 1991.

In 1994, she left the African files for the Middle East and became first secretary at the French Embassy in Israel. She was responsible for monitoring the Israeli-Palestinian peace process and was present during the assassination of Prime Minister Yitzhak Rabin. In 1998, she left the Middle East to tackle European issues, taking the post of First Secretary at the French Embassy in Spain, where she followed foreign policy issues.

In 2000, she returned to African affairs by being appointed technical adviser to Charles Josselin, Minister Delegate for Foreign Affairs. She is notably in charge of setting up the High Council for International Cooperation, a consultative body created to promote and make solidarity and international cooperation more consistent, at the time when the Ministry of Cooperation and the Ministry of Foreign Affairs were merged.

In 2002, she was an adviser to Pierre Sellal and Sylvie Bermann at the permanent representation of France to the European Union in Brussels and was part of the political and security committee. In this capacity, she followed the implementation of the first military operations carried out under the European security and defense policy, in application of the Saint-Malo declaration in the Balkans and in Africa.

In 2005, she was appointed Deputy Director for Central and Eastern Africa at the Ministry of Foreign Affairs. She followed in particular the question of Darfur, the setting up of a French, then European operation to fight against piracy in Somalia, and more generally the files relating to East Africa and to the Great Lakes region, particularly the Democratic Republic of the Congo.

In 2009, she became Consul General of France in Quebec, Canada. She was the first woman appointed to this position. In 2011, she was proposed as French ambassador to Rwanda, but was not appointed.

In 2012, she took the post of Africa adviser to President François Hollande.

From 2016 to 2019, she was the French Ambassador to Israel. From 2019 to 2022, she was the French Ambassador to Morocco. She was the first woman to hold either position.

In 2022, Le Gal was appointed Director General for the Middle East and North Africa of the European Union's External Action Service.
