= Patrick Maisonnave =

French diplomat (born 1963)

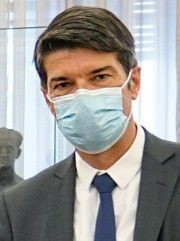
- Patrick Maisonnave

Ambassador of France to Israel
- In office 2013–2016
- President: François Hollande
- Preceded by: Christophe Bigot
- Succeeded by: Hélène Le Gal

Ambassador of France to Greece
- In office 2019–2023
- President: Emmanuel Macron
- Preceded by: Christophe Chantepy
- Succeeded by: Laurence Auer

Personal details
- Born: 6 September 1963 (age 62) Bayonne, France
- Profession: Diplomat

Patrick Maisonnave (born 6 September 1963) is a French diplomat. He was the French Ambassador to Israel between 2013 and 2016. He served as French Ambassador to Greece from 2019 to 2023. He is currently (June 2025) French Ambassador to Saudi Arabia.

== Biography ==
Patrick Maisonnave obtained a master's degree in economics and a diploma from the Paris Institute of Political Studies before joining the Condorcet promotion of the National School of Administration in 1990. From 1992 to 1993, he was in the management Economic and Financial Affairs and then European Cooperation in 1993.

In 1997, he became a technical adviser to the office of Minister Delegate for European Affairs Pierre Moscovici, then in 2001 to the office of the mayor of Paris Bertrand Delanoë and, in 2004, to the French Embassy in Greece in Athens . In 2007, he was head of the European Union's external relations department and in 2009, director of strategic affairs, security and disarmament at the Ministry of Foreign Affairs.
