= Éric Danon =

French diplomat (born 1957)

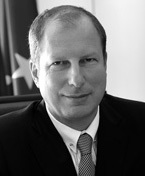

Ambassador of France to Israel
- In office 2019–2023
- President: Emmanuel Macron
- Preceded by: Hélène Le Gal
- Succeeded by: Frédéric Journès

Personal details
- Born: 22 February 1957 (age 69) Paris, France
- Spouse: Marie-Christine Dupuis-Danon
- Profession: Diplomat

Éric Danon (born 22 February 1957) is a French diplomat who served as French Ambassador to Israel from 2019 to 2023.

== Career ==
=== Ambassador to Israel ===
On 21 June 2019 Éric Danon was appointed by President Emmanuel Macron, Extraordinary and Plenipotentiary Ambassador of the French Republic to the State of Israel.

In January 2020, four months after Éric Danon took office, Emmanuel Macron made his first visit to Israel as president.

== Private life ==
Éric Danon is married to Marie-Christine Dupuis-Danon and is a father of five children.
