= List of ambassadors of France to Greece =

The following is a (currently) incomplete list of ambassadors of France to Greece.

For ambassadors and high-ranking diplomats of France in Greece who were active between 1815 and 1905, the data below is taken from a list of diplomats published in 1906 by the French Ministry of Foreign Affairs. For ambassadors and diplomats who were active after 1944, the data comes from two more recent lists also compiled by the ministry. Additional individual references are given in the table.

From	To	Ambassador or diplomat of highest rank	Notes
1828	1835	Achille Rouen	Consul General until 1833 and Resident Minister afterwards
	1843	Théodore de Lagrené	Resident Minister until 1840 and Minister Plenipotentiary afterwards
1843	1847	Théobald Piscatory	Minister Plenipotentiary
1848		Philippe Eugène Guillemot	Chargé d'Affaires
1849	1850	Édouard Thouvenel	Envoy Extraordinary and Minister Plenipotentiary
1850	1851	Victor Lobstein	Envoy Extraordinary and Minister Plenipotentiary
1851	1854	Baron Alexandre de Forth-Rouen	Envoy Extraordinary and Minister Plenipotentiary
1854	1857	Henri Mercier	Envoy Extraordinary and Minister Plenipotentiary
1857	1859	Jean-Charles de Montherot	Minister Plenipotentiary
1859	1859	Vicomte de Serres	Minister Plenipotentiary
1859	1863	Nicolas Prosper Bourée	Minister Plenipotentiary
1864	1868	Joseph Arthur de Gobineau	Minister Plenipotentiary
1868	1870	Georges-Napoléon Baude	Minister Plenipotentiary
1872	1872	Marquis de Cazeaux	Interim Chargé d'Affaires
1872	1872	Jules Ferry	Minister Plenipotentiary
1872	1873	Vicomte Roger de Borrelli	Interim Chargé d'Affaires
1873	1876	Marquis de Gabriac	Envoy Extraordinary and Minister Plenipotentiary
1876	1880	Charles Tissot	Envoy Extraordinary and Minister Plenipotentiary
1880	1880	Maurice Ternaux-Compans	Interim Chargé d'Affaires
1880	1880	Baron des Michels	Envoy Extraordinary and Minister Plenipotentiary
1880	1886	Charles de Moüy	Envoy Extraordinary and Minister Plenipotentiary
1886	1894	Charles Jean Tristan de Montholon	Envoy Extraordinary and Minister Plenipotentiary
1894	1897	Frédéric Albert Bourée	Envoy Extraordinary and Minister Plenipotentiary
1897	1909	Olivier d'Ormesson	Envoy Extraordinary and Minister Plenipotentiary
1909	1915	Gabriel Deville	Envoy Extraordinary and Minister Plenipotentiary
1915	1917	Jean Guillemin	Envoy Extraordinary and Minister Plenipotentiary
August 1917	1921	Robert de Billy	
1921	1921	Jean Tripier	Interim Chargé d'affaires
December 1921	October 1924	Henri Chassain de Marcilly	Envoy Extraordinary and Minister Plenipotentiary
1924	1926	Charles de Chambrun	Envoy Extraordinary and Minister Plenipotentiary
1927	1927	Louis Frédéric Clément-Simon	
		...	
??	1938	Adrien-Joseph-Marie Thierry	Envoy Extraordinary and Minister Plenipotentiary
1938	1941	Gaston Maugras	
February 1941	1941	Jean Helleu	Envoy Extraordinary and Minister Plenipotentiary
1944	1945	Jean Baelen	Representative of the Provisional Government
1945	1951	Christian Carra de Vaux de Saint-Cyr	
1951	1955	Jean Baelen	
1955	1957	Pierre Albert Charpentier	
1957	1964	Guy de Girard de Charbonnières	
1964	1969	Jacques Baeyens	
1969	1973	Bernard Durand	
1973	1975	Christian Jacquin de Margerie	
1975	1977	Jean-Marie Mérillon	
1977	1980	Jacques de Folin	
1980	1981	Philippe Rebeyrol	
1981	1985	Dominique Charpy	
1985	1987	Pierre-Louis Blanc	
1987	1989	Marcel Plaisant	
1989	1992	Jacques Thibau	
1992	1995	Jean Cadet	
1995	2000	Bernard Kessedjian	
2000	2003	Jean-Maurice Ripert	
2003	2007	Bruno Delaye	
2007	2011	Christophe Farnaud	
2011	2015	Jean-Loup Kuhn-Delforge	
2015	2019	Christophe Chantepy	
2019	2023	Patrick Maisonnave	
2023		Laurence Auer	

== See also ==
- France–Greece relations
