= Laurence Auer =

French diplomat

French ambassador to Greece
- Incumbent
- Assumed office August 2023

French ambassador to Romania
- In office September 2020 – July 2023

French ambassador to North Macedonia
- In office November 2012 – August 2016

Personal details
- Born: August 26, 1959 (age 66) Geneva, Switzerland

Laurence Auer (born 26 August 1959 in Geneva) is a French diplomat. Since 2023, she has served as the French ambassador to Greece, and previously served as French ambassador to Romania between October 2020 and July 2023.

== Career ==
From June 2003 to September 2006, she served as deputy spokesperson for French President Jacques Chirac, before becoming the director of the Institut français du Royaume-Uni for four years.

In November 2012, she was appointed as French ambassador to North Macedonia, where she remained until August 2016.

In September 2020, she became the French ambassador to Romania. Shortly after her appointment ended, on July 11, 2023, she was appointed as French ambassador to Greece, replacing Patrick Maisonnave effective August 1, 2023.
