= Jean-Noël de Bouillane de Lacoste =

French diplomat (1934–2020)

Third Secretary of France to the United Nations in New York City
- In office 1964–1967

Second Secretary of France to Poland
- In office 1967–1970

Second Consulate of France in Santiago, Chile
- In office 1973–1975

Second Consulate of France in Beijing, China
- In office 1975–1979

Ambassador of France to Laos
- In office 1982–1985
- Preceded by: Roger Duzer
- Succeeded by: Marc Menguy

Consulate Minister of France in London, United Kingdom
- In office 1985–1989

Ambassador of France to Tunisia
- In office 1992–1995
- Preceded by: Alain Grenier
- Succeeded by: Jacques Lanxade

Ambassador of France to Israel
- In office 1995–1999
- Preceded by: Pierre Brochand
- Succeeded by: Jacques Huntzinger

Personal details
- Born: 23 December 1934 Vendôme, France
- Died: 21 July 2020 (aged 85) Le Kremlin-Bicêtre, France

Jean-Noël de Bouillane de Lacoste (23 December 1934 – 21 July 2020) was a French ambassador and diplomat.

== Biography ==
De Bouillane de Lacoste was the son of Henry Adrien de Bouillane de Lacoste. He was a descendant of the de Bouillane family, with old nobility from Dauphiné. De Bouillane de Lacoste studied at Lycée Ronsard in Vendôme and the Lycée Michel Montaigne in Bordeaux. He earned a degree in political studies from the École nationale d'administration in 1964.

De Bouillane de Lacoste served numerous ambassadorial roles throughout his career, most notably as Ambassador of France to Laos, to Tunisia, and to Israel.

He also served as President of the Fréquence protestante radio from 2001 to 2007. He also wrote in the journal Réforme. He was an active member of Action des chrétiens pour l'abolition de la torture.

Jean-Noël de Bouillane de Lacoste died on 21 July 2020 in Le Kremlin-Bicêtre at the age of 85.

== Distinctions ==
- Commander of the Legion of Honour
- Commander of the Ordre national du Mérite
- Officer of the Order of Polonia Restituta
