= Émile Daeschner =

French diplomat

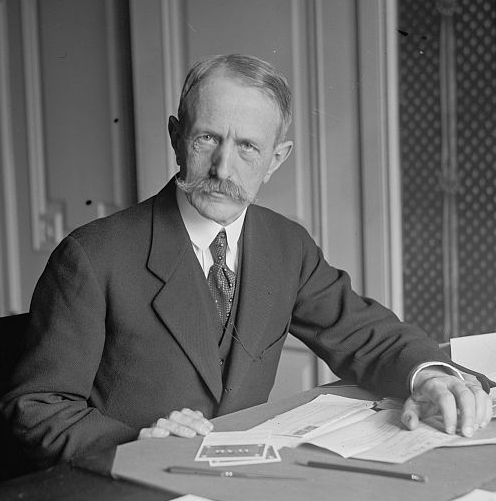
- Émile Daeschner, 1925

French Ambassador to Turkey
- In office 1926–1928
- Preceded by: Albert Sarraut
- Succeeded by: Charles de Chambrun

French Ambassador to the United States
- In office January 1925 – January 1926
- Preceded by: Jean Jules Jusserand
- Succeeded by: Henry Bérenger

Personal details
- Born: Émile Nosky-Georges-Henri Emile Daeschner; 3 January 1863 Paris, France
- Died: 13 December 1928 (aged 65) Paris, France
- Spouse: Henriette Krug
- Children: 4
- Parent(s): Ludwig Daeschner; Louise Caroline de Fernex
- Education: Sciences Po
- Occupation: Diplomat

Émile Nosky-Georges-Henri Emile Daeschner (3 January 1863 – December 13, 1928) was a French diplomat.

== Early life ==
Daeschner was born on 3 January 1863 in the 10th arrondissement of Paris. He was the son of Alasatian Protestant parents, Ludwig Daeschner (1828–1878), a merchant from Karlsruhe, and Louise Caroline de Fernex (1830–1891), who was born in Nyon, Switzerland.

He earned a law degree and was a graduate of the Sciences Po.

== Career ==
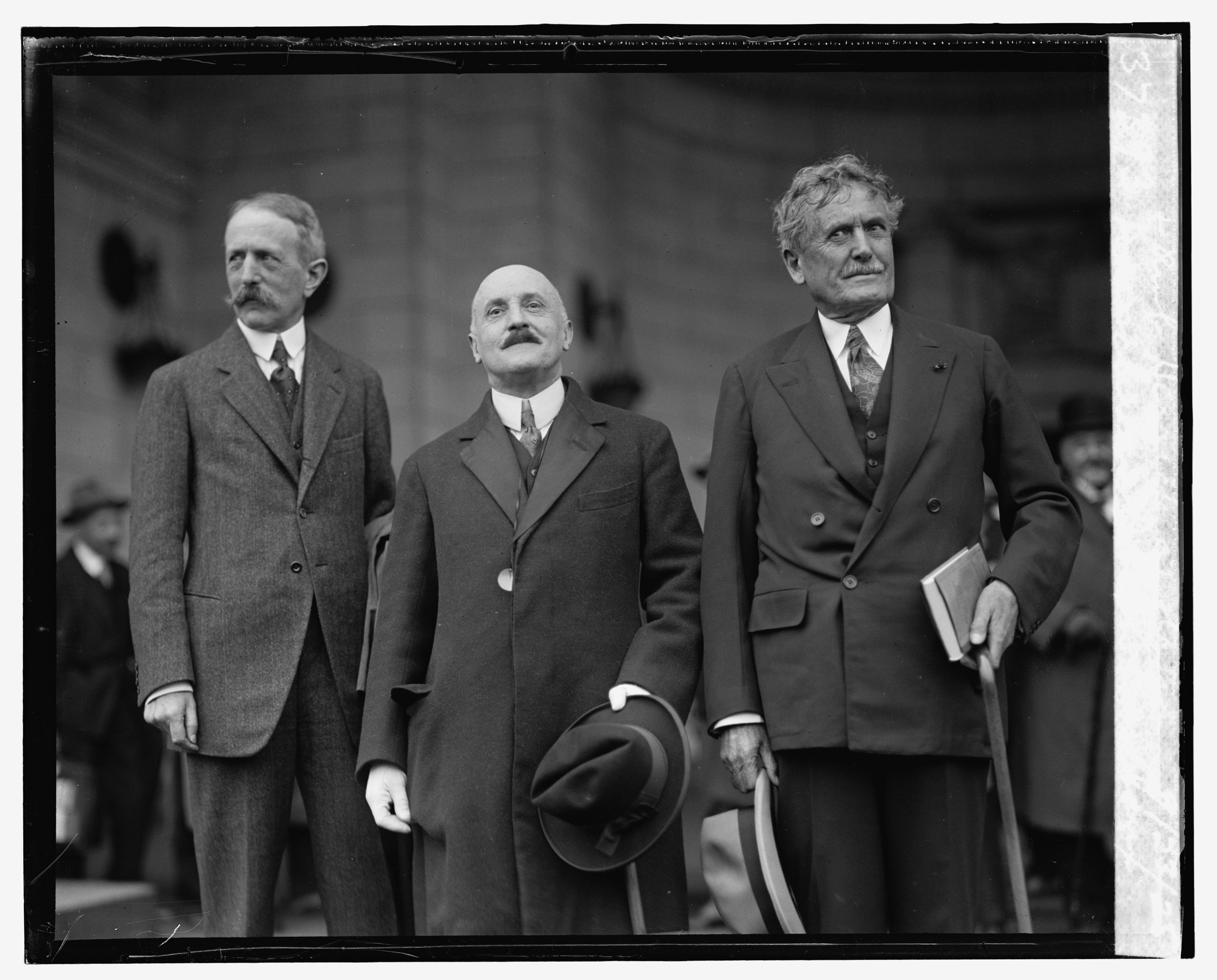
Daeschner, Prime Minister Joseph Caillaux and Ambassador Myron T. Herrick, 1925

In 1887, after being admitted to the competition in the diplomatic and consular career, he became attached to the political leadership in the office of Foreign Minister. Reportedly, he was "one of the favorite pupils of Paul Cambon, considered the greatest Ambassador of the Third Republic."

From 1888 to 1897, he held various positions in the Foreign Ministry, and in 1898 was appointed second secretary at the embassy in London. From 1905 to 1906, he was chief of staff of the Prime Minister Maurice Rouvier and staff of the Minister of Foreign Affairs. In February 1906, he is member of the French delegation to the funeral of Christian IX of Denmark. From 1906 to 1908 he worked as first secretary of the Embassy of France in Madrid and at the Embassy of France in London.

In 1909, he was appointed Minister Plenipotentiary. In 1912, he was chief of staff and staff of Raymond Poincaré, President of the Council and Minister of Foreign Affairs. From 1913, he was Minister Plenipotentiary 1st class in Lisbon (Portugal) and in Bucharest (Romania) in 1920.

=== Ambassador to the United States and Turkey ===
In December 1924, he was appointed Ambassador of France in Washington, United States. Upon his arrival in New York on board the Paris in January 1925, accompanied by his wife and daughters, he was greeted by forty members of the French Institute. He was replaced by Henry Bérenger in an attempt by France to reach a debt deal (his negotiations led to the Mellon-Berenger Agreement for settling war debts).

After leaving the United States in January 1926, he succeeded Albert Sarraut as the Ambassador of France to Turkey, before his retirement in 1928. He was succeeded in Ankara by Charles de Chambrun.

== Personal life ==
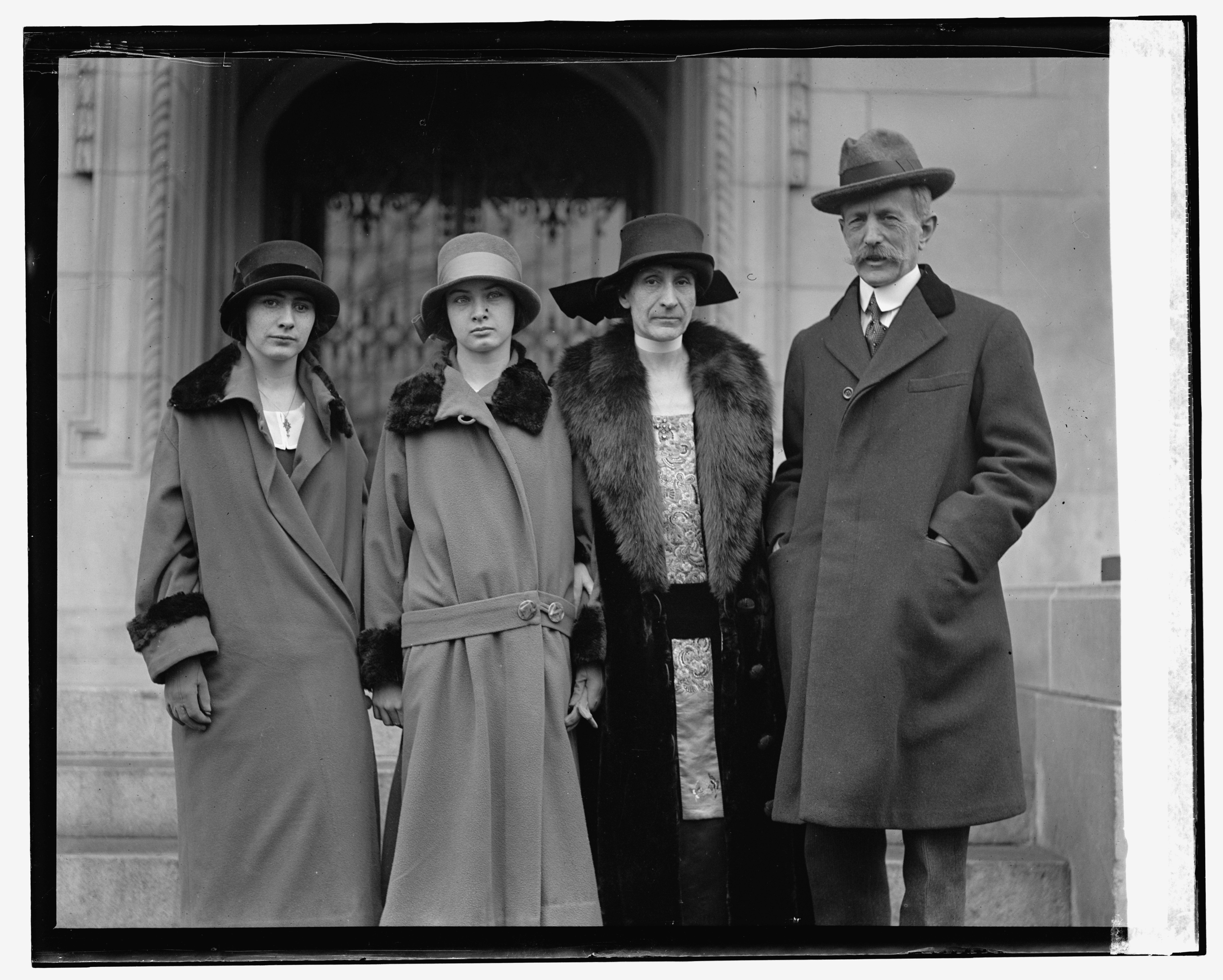
Photograph of Daeschner, his wife and two daughters, Antionette and Irene, 1925.

He married Henriette Krug (1876–1929), daughter of Paul Krug and Caroline Harle. Together, they had four children. In discussing her time in Washington, she was reported to say:

"Life in Washington seemed charming and quiet after Paris, London and New York, but politics dominated everything, and the intellectual and artistic centres were not so well developed as in other cities perhaps, she said, because of the absence of great wealth, which is necessary for such development."

He died at his home in the 16th arrondissement of Paris after a short illness on December 13, 1928.
