= List of ambassadors of France to Romania =

French ambassadors to Romania

The following is a list of ambassadors and other highest-ranking representatives of France to Romania. The embassy of France in Romania is the diplomatic representation of the French Republic, in Bucharest, the capital. Since 2023 the ambassador has been Nicolas Warnery.

== History ==
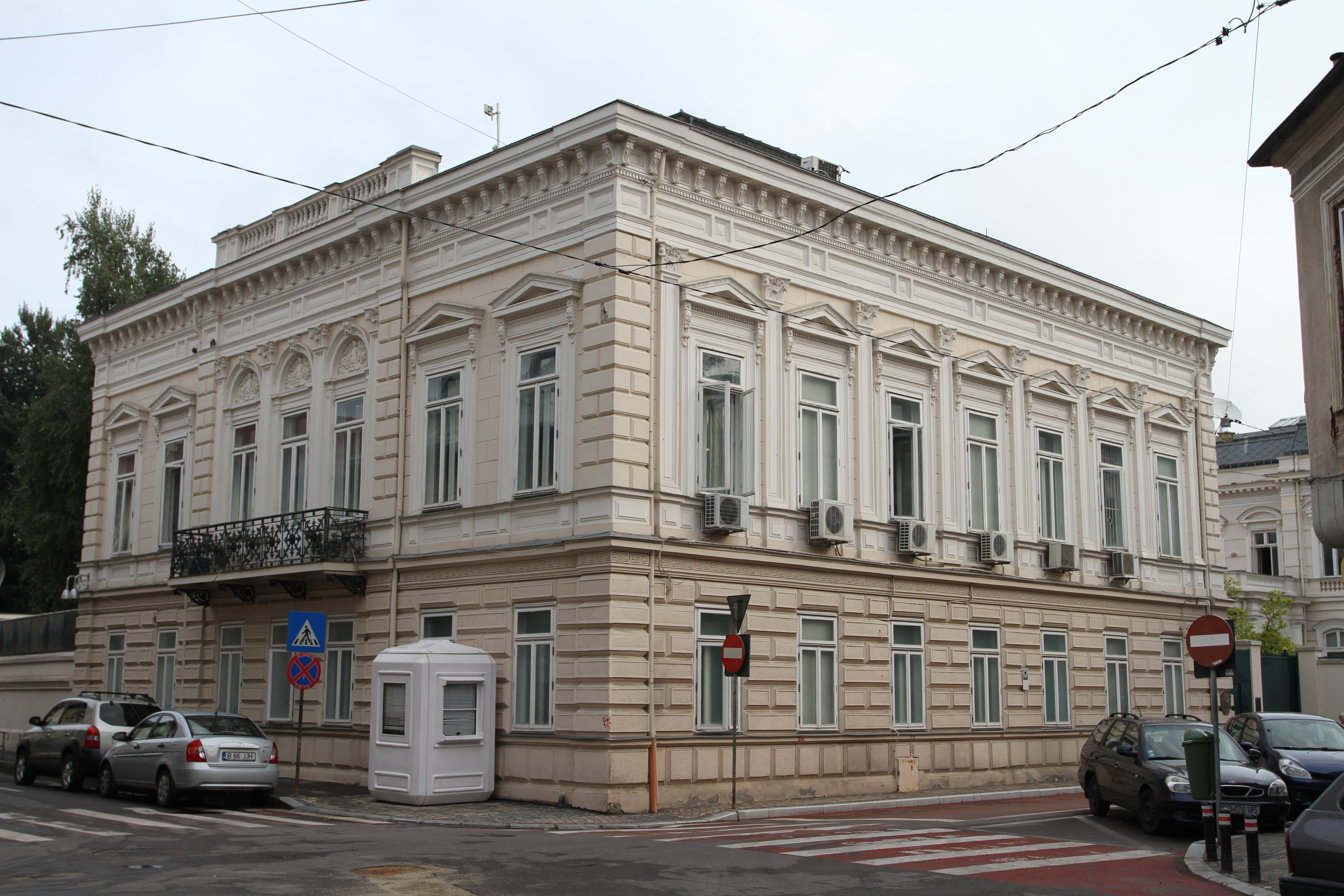
Embassy of France, Bucharest

During World War I, Romania joined the Allies and became known as "Greater Romania" between the two wars. In November 1938, diplomatic relations were elevated to the level of embassy. During the World War II, the Embassy continued to function, because the Vichy regime and that of Marshal Ion Antonescu (self-proclaimed " Romanian Petain") maintained official and friendly diplomatic relations. With the Liberation occurring at the same time in France and Romania, it also remained in operation during the post-war period. However, this activity was quite reduced during the communist regime in Romania, except in 1968 and 1979 when Charles de Gaulle and, then President Giscard d'Estaing, paid state visits to Nicolae Ceaușescu in Bucharest.

But 1989–1991 followed the fall of the dictatorship and the Iron Curtain, a period of intense activity, particularly at the level of the consulate and the commercial and cultural attachés, with the reestablishment of democracy, the market economy, free cultural relations and the free movement of goods and people; during this period, it was the French President François Mitterrand who paid a state visit to his Romanian counterpart Ion Iliescu.

Shortly after Romania joined the European Union in 2007, President Traian Băsescu declared his country's foreign policy a priority, along with France and the United States on an equal footing.

== Ambassadors of France in Romania ==
| From | To | Ambassador |
|---|---|---|
| 1881 | 1885 | Maximilien-Napoléon-Théodore baron de Ring |
| 1885 | 1894 | Gustave de Coutouly de Dorset |
| 1894 | 1897 | Eugène Thomas |
| 1897 | 1904 | Arsène Henry |
| 1904 | 1907 | Ernest-René Joseph Adrien Bourgarel |
| 1907 | 1916 | Jean-Camille Blondel |
| 1917 | 1920 | Auguste-Félix-Charles de Beaupoil, Count of Saint-Aulaire |
| 1920 | 1923 | Émile Daeschner |
| 1933 | 1936 | André d'Ormesson |
| 1936 | 1940 | Adrien Thierry |
| 1940 | 1943 | Jacques Truelle |
| 1943 | 1944 | Paul Morand |
| 1944 | 1945 | Roger Sarret |
| 1945 | 1948 | Jean Paul-Boncour |
| 1948 | 1950 | Pierre Charpentier |
| 1950 | 1952 | Charles Gaire |
| 1952 | 1953 | Renaud Sivan |
| 1953 | 1958 | Pierre Francfort |
| 1958 | 1960 | Jacques-Émile Paris |
| 1960 | 1964 | Pierre Bouffanais |
| 1964 | 1968 | Louis Pons |
| 1968 | 1972 | Pierre Pelen |
| 1972 | 1975 | Francis Levasseur |
| 1975 | 1977 | Raoul Delaye |
| 1977 | 1981 | Pierre Cerles |
| 1981 | 1983 | Marcel Beaux |
| 1983 | 1987 | Michel Rougagnou |
| 1987 | 1990 | Jean-Marie Le Breton |
| 1990 | 1993 | Renaud Vignal |
| 1993 | 1997 | Bernard Boyer |
| 1997 | 2002 | Pierre Ménat |
| 2002 | 2004 | Philippe Étienne |
| 2004 | 2007 | Hervé Bolot |
| 2007 | 2012 | Henri Paul |
| 2012 | 2014 | Philippe Gustin |
| 2014 | 2017 | François Saint-Paul |
| 2017 | 2020 | Michèle Ramis |
| 2020 | 2023 | Laurence Auer |
| 2023 | Present | Nicolas Warnery |

== See also ==
- France–Romania relations
