= Philippe Gustin =

French civil servant (born 1960)

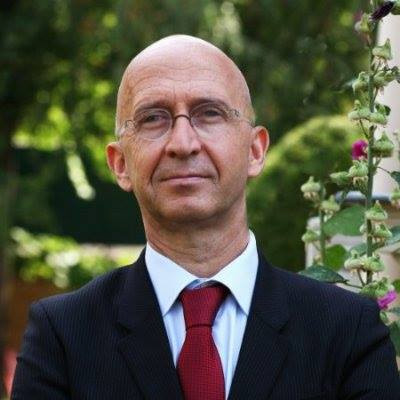
- Gustin in 2015

Chief of Staff to the Prime Minister
- Incumbent
- Assumed office 10 September 2025
- Prime Minister: Sébastien Lecornu
- Preceded by: Nicolas Pernot

Personal details
- Born: Philippe Michel Gustin; 24 March 1960 (age 66) Châlons-sur-Marne, France
- Party: Union for a Popular Movement (until 2015); The Republicans (since 2015)

Philippe Michel Gustin (French pronunciation: [filip ɡystɛ̃]; born 24 March 1960) is a French civil servant and former diplomat who has served as chief of staff to prime minister Sébastien Lecornu since 2025.

From 2020 to 2022, he served as chief of staff to Lecornu as minister of the overseas. From 2022 to 2023, he served as chief of staff to Lecornu as minister of the armed forces. From 2024 to 2025, he served as chief of staff to agriculture minister Annie Genevard. From 2023 to 2024, he served as prefect of Brittany. From 2018 to 2020, he served as prefect of Guadeloupe. In the 2017 legislative election, he was a candidate for the National Assembly in the seventh constituency for citizens abroad. From 2012 to 2014, he served as ambassador to Romania. From 2009 to 2012, he served as chief of staff to education minister Luc Chatel.
