= Charles de Beaupoil, comte de Saint-Aulaire =

French aristocrat, diplomat, author and historian

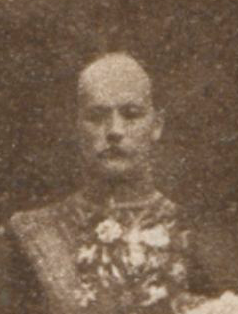
As Ambassador in Bucharest

Count of Saint-Aulaire's arms

Auguste-Félix-Charles de Beaupoil, comte de Saint-Aulaire (born 13 August 1866 at Angoulême; died 26 September 1954 in Périgord) was a French aristocrat, diplomat, author and historian.

== Education ==
The only son of Auguste de Beaupoil, comte de Saint-Aulaire, by his wife Isabelle-Epremier-Esther daughter of Amable-Félix Couturier de Vienne, he succeeded his father as head of the ancient and noble family which originated in Brittany. He was educated by Jesuits in Bordeaux before studying at Sciences Po in Paris.

== Career ==
After joining the French Ministry of Foreign Affairs, his first diplomatic posting abroad was as Attaché in Chile, then back in France at the CCI in Marseilles, before in 1894 as Attaché in Tunis and in 1902 Chargé d'affaires in Tangiers. He then served as Minister-Counsellor in Vienna (1909–1912), before being recalled to the Quai d'Orsay upon the recommendation of General Lyautey, participating in the negotiations of the Treaty of Bucharest (1916).

From 1917 to 1920, he served as the French Ambassador to Romania in Bucharest. After World War I, he served briefly in 1920 as French Ambassador to Madrid, where he replaced Gabriel Alapetite, before being promoted as Ambassador to the United Kingdom, serving in London until 1924.

The Comte de Saint-Aulaire retired to the Château de La Malartrie on the Dordogne where he concentrated on writing, including works about Emperor Franz-Joseph, Prince Talleyrand and Cardinal Richelieu.

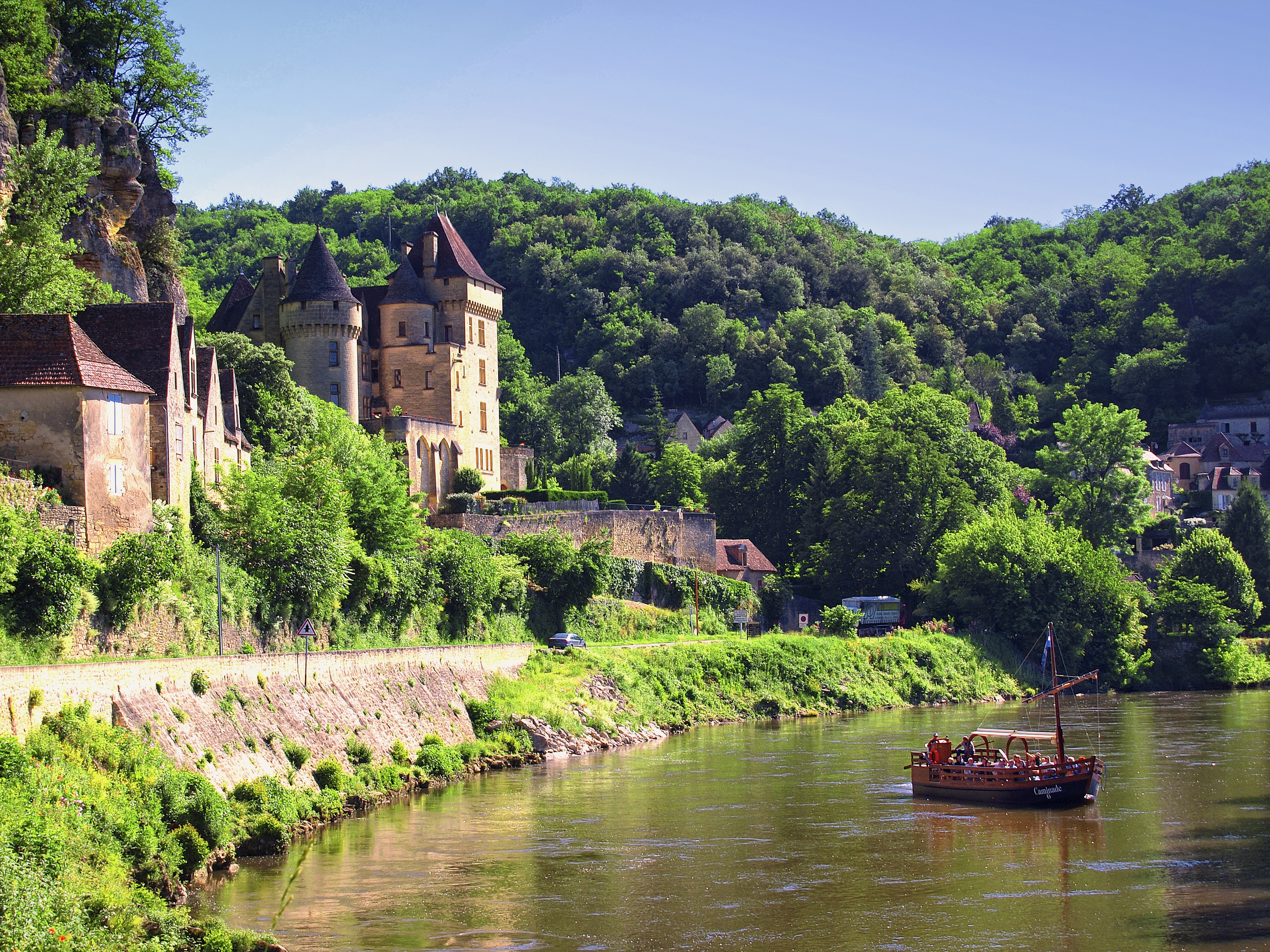
Château de La Malartrie

He married, on 16 January 1899 in Paris, Marguérite-Henriette daughter of Count Léopold-Ferdinand Balny d'Avricourt; they had two daughters and a son, Edmond-Marie-Charles (married Marie-Gisèle-Claire-Ida Robillard de Magnanville), who succeeded him as comte de Saint-Aulaire.

== Honours ==
- Grand officier, Légion d'honneur
- Knight, Palmes académiques
- Knight, Sovereign Military Order of Malta
- Knight Commander, St Gregory the Great

== See also ==
- De Beaupoil de Saint-Aulaire family
