= Gérard Araud =

French diplomat (born 1953)

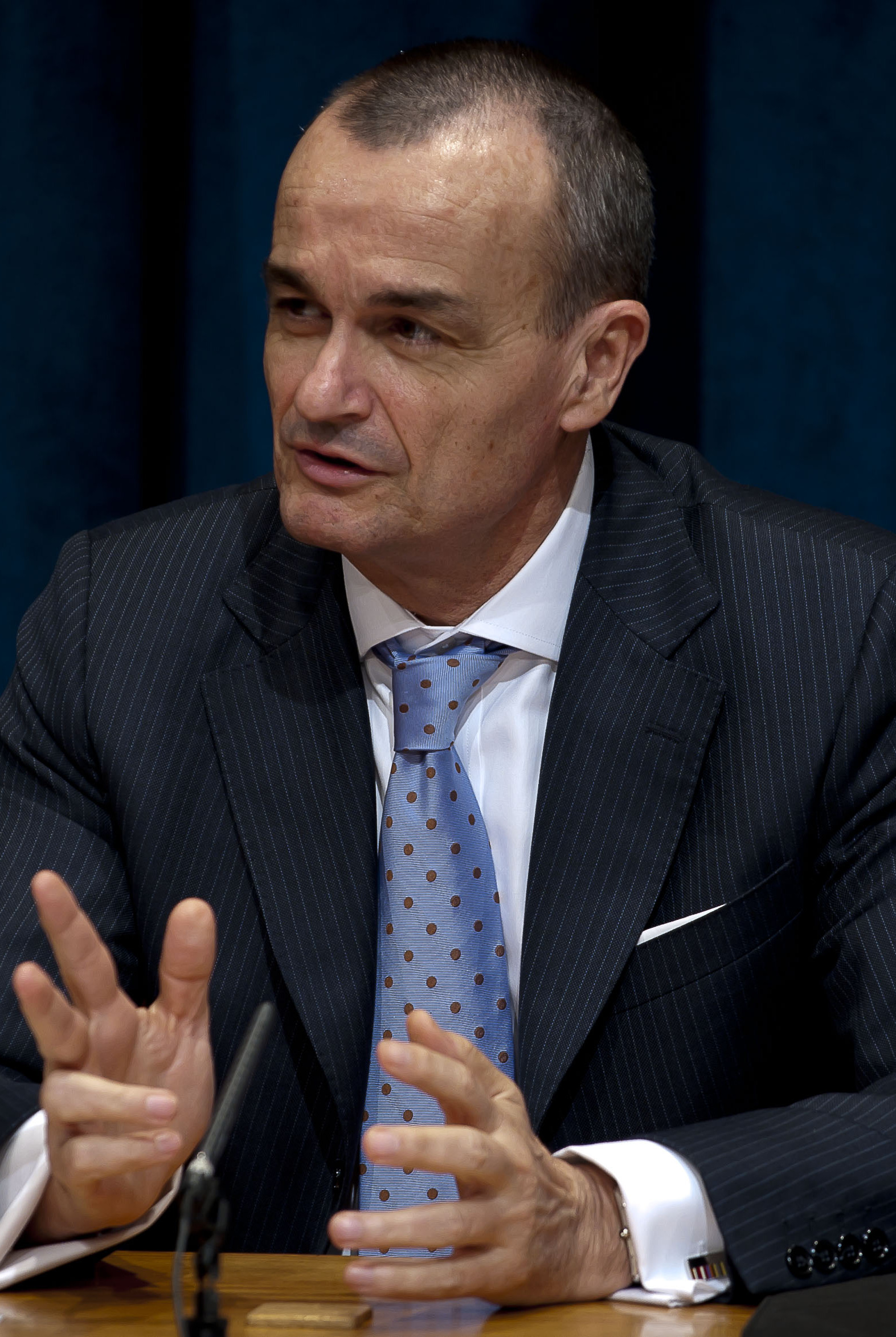
- Gérard Araud in 2011

Ambassador of France to the United States
- In office 18 September 2014 – 9 July 2019
- President: François Hollande; Emmanuel Macron
- Preceded by: François Delattre
- Succeeded by: Philippe Étienne

Permanent Representative of France to the United Nations
- In office 15 July 2009 – 15 July 2014
- President: Nicolas Sarkozy; François Hollande
- Secretary-General: Ban Ki-moon
- Preceded by: Jean-Maurice Ripert
- Succeeded by: François Delattre

Ambassador of France to Israel
- In office 2003–2006
- President: Jacques Chirac
- Preceded by: Jacques Gabriel Huntzinger
- Succeeded by: Jean-Michel Casa

Personal details
- Born: 20 February 1953 (age 73) Marseille, France
- Spouse: Pascal Blondeau
- Education: Lycée Thiers
- Alma mater: École Polytechnique; ENSAE ParisTech; Sciences Po; École nationale d'administration
- Profession: Diplomat

Gérard Araud (born 20 February 1953) is a French retired diplomat who served as Ambassador of France to the United States from 2014 to 2019. He was Director General for Political and Security Affairs of the Ministry of Foreign Affairs from 2006 to 2009, and France's permanent representative to the United Nations from 2009 to 2014.

== Early life ==
Gérard Araud was born in Marseille. He holds engineering degrees from the École Polytechnique (class of 1973) and ENSAE. Araud, who also graduated from the Sciences Po, is an alumnus of the École nationale d'administration (class of 1982).

== Career ==
Araud's first posting was at the embassy of France in Tel Aviv as First Secretary, from 1982 to 1984. He was then assigned to Paris, at the Analysis and Policy Planning Staff of the Ministry of Foreign Affairs where he was responsible for Middle East issues. From 1987 to 1991 he was Counselor at the Embassy of France in Washington, where he was also responsible for Middle East issues. He was Assistant Director of European Community Affairs at the Ministry of Foreign Affairs from 1991 to 1993 and became Diplomatic Advisor to the French Minister of Defense François Léotard in 1993.

Araud joined the French delegation to the North Atlantic Council (NATO) in Brussels in 1995 as Deputy Permanent Representative. He became Director for Strategic Affairs, Security and Disarmament at the Ministry of Foreign Affairs in 2000. He was Ambassador of France to Israel from 2003 to 2006.

In September 2006, Araud was appointed Director General for Political Affairs and Security, Deputy Secretary General of the Ministry of Foreign Affairs. On July 15, 2009, he was appointed Permanent Representative of France to the Security Council and Head of the Permanent Mission of France to the United Nations. He presented his credentials to Ban Ki-moon, United Nations Secretary-General, on 10 September 10, 2009. He served as the President of the Security Council in February 2010, May 2011, August 2012, and December 2013.

In July 2014 Araud was appointed Ambassador of France to the United States by presidential decree.

On the night of the election of Donald Trump as president, Araud tweeted: "It is the end of an era, the era of neoliberalism. We don't yet know what will succeed it," followed by: "After Brexit and this election anything is possible. A world is collapsing before our eyes. Vertigo." Reading this as an undiplomatic expression of dismay at the result, right-wing French political activists called for Araud's dismissal, which did not occur.

On Pearl Harbor Day in 2017, Araud tweeted, "In this Pearl Harbor day, we should remember that the US refused to side with France and the UK to confront the fascist powers in the 30s." After the tweet was met with criticism, Araud deleted it and attempted to clarify his remarks.

In July 2018, Araud sent a letter to The Daily Show host, Trevor Noah. Noah had made comments on his show regarding the multiethnicity of the France national football team following their win in the 2018 FIFA World Cup. Araud criticized Noah’s remarks and sent him a formal letter. Noah responded to the letter in between scenes of his show. His comments were also added to Twitter, where Araud declared an end to the argument on X: "[Noah] said »they are African. They couldn’t get this suntan in the south of France ». i.e They can’t be French because they are black. The argument of the white supremacist."

In 2019 when retiring as French ambassador to the United States, Araud gave an assessment of Trump and drew a comparison to French history. He described the Trump administration as having the polar opposite of the meticulous decision-making process of the Obama administration, resembling that of Louis XIV, an old ruler who was a "whimsical, unpredictable, uninformed" leader who nonetheless wanted to be making the decisions, and he noted that Trump's "unpredictability and his single-minded transactional interpretation of US interests was leaving the administration isolated on the world stage." He also provided some advice in an interview with Politico, "keep cool". Before leaving his post in Washington, Araud described the city as being full of provincial early-bird dinners, "sad" baggy suits, and awful jeans.

In April 2019, Araud became a consultant for 12 months to the Israeli IT security company NSO Group, advising on human rights, but saw the potential for misuse of its Pegasus spyware, and did not renew his contract. For his undeclared work with NSO, he is subject to a deduction of Euro 5,000 from his diplomatic pension.

== Other activities ==
- International Crisis Group (ICG), Board of Trustees (since 2019)
- Araud is a Senior Advisor at Albright Stonebridge Group.

== Personal life ==
Araud is openly gay and supports same-sex marriage. His long-time partner is photographer Pascal Blondeau.

== Publications ==
- Passeport diplomatique : quarante ans au Quai d'Orsay ("Diplomatic passport: forty years at the Quai d'Orsay"), Paris, Éditions Grasset, 2019, 384 p.
- Henry Kissinger : le diplomate du siècle ("Henry Kissinger: the diplomat of the century"), Tallandier, 2021, 336 p.
- Histoires diplomatiques : Leçons d'hier pour le monde d'aujourd'hui ("Diplomatic Histories: Lessons from yesterday for today's world"), Paris, Éditions Grasset, 2022, 320 p.
- Nous étions seuls : une histoire diplomatique de la France 1919-1939 ("We were alone: a diplomatic history of France 1919-1939"), Tallandier, 2023, 336 p.
