= Jacques Fouques-Duparc =

French diplomat (1897–1966)

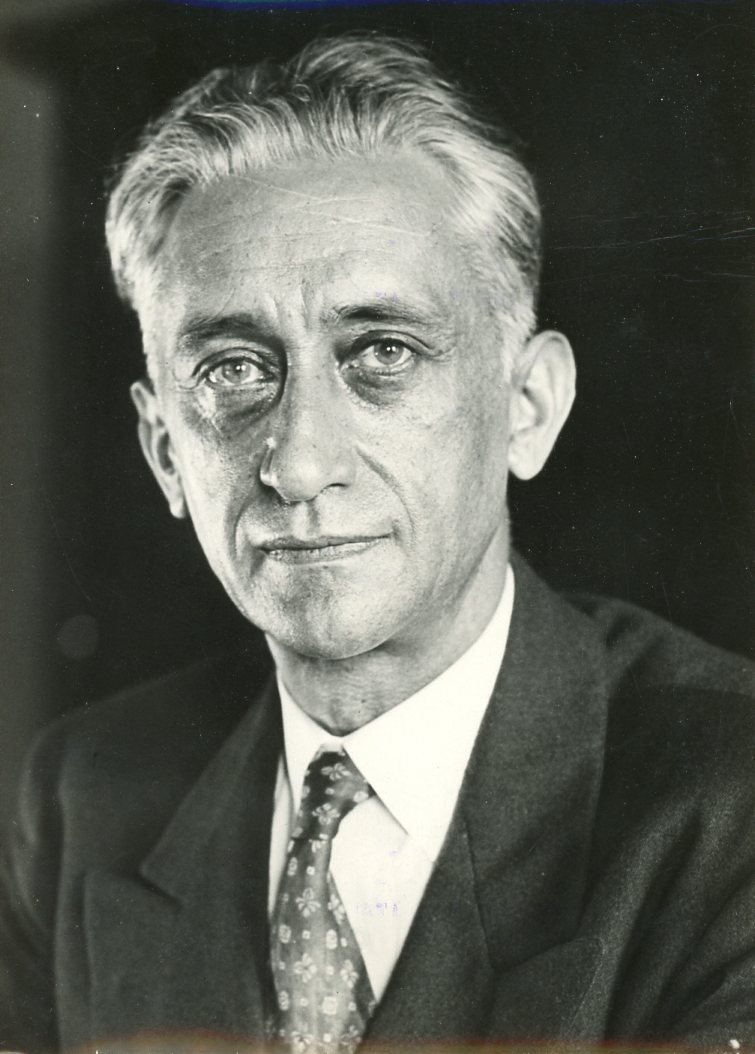
Jacques Fouques-Duparc

Jacques Fouques-Duparc (4 March 1897, in Paris – 2 August 1966) was a French diplomat and writer.

== Early life ==
Jacques Fouques-Duparc was born in Paris on 4 March 1897, the son of a diplomat. He studied at the Lycée Condorcet and later at the Institut d'Études Politiques de Paris (Sciences-Po) and became licentiate in literature and doctor of law. He was a soldier during World War I and received the Croix de guerre.

== Diplomatic career ==
Fouques-Duparc began his diplomatic career in 1921 as part of the French delegation at the League of Nations, the precursor to the United Nations which had been founded in 1919. He worked there until 1924 and again between 1926 and 1932. From 1924 to 1926, he worked as an embassy secretary at the French embassy in Berlin. In 1932, Fouques-Duparc returned to France where he worked in various positions in the central administration of the Ministry of Foreign Affairs and as a senior advisor for Louis Barthou and Yvon Delbos. In 1938, he left France again, this time for Madrid where he worked at the embassy for a year before joining the French public radio administration as the head of the foreign language broadcasts. After the French defeat to Germany in 1940, Fouques-Duparc, who was hostile to the Vichy Regime, was dismissed and joined the French Resistance.

Following the war, Fouques-Duparc resumed his diplomatic career and was a delegate at the 1945 United Nations Conference on International Organization in San Francisco and a senior advisor to Léon Blum. In 1947, he was named French ambassador to Italy and held the position until 1957. He finished his career in France holding various responsibilities in French foreign affairs.

== Partial bibliography ==
- La protection des minorités de race, de langue et de religion : Étude de droit des gens, Dalloz, 1922. (Full text)
- Le Troisième Richelieu. Libérateur du territoire en 1815, Lyon, Lardanchet, 1940
