= Saint-Haon-le-Châtel =

- Commune
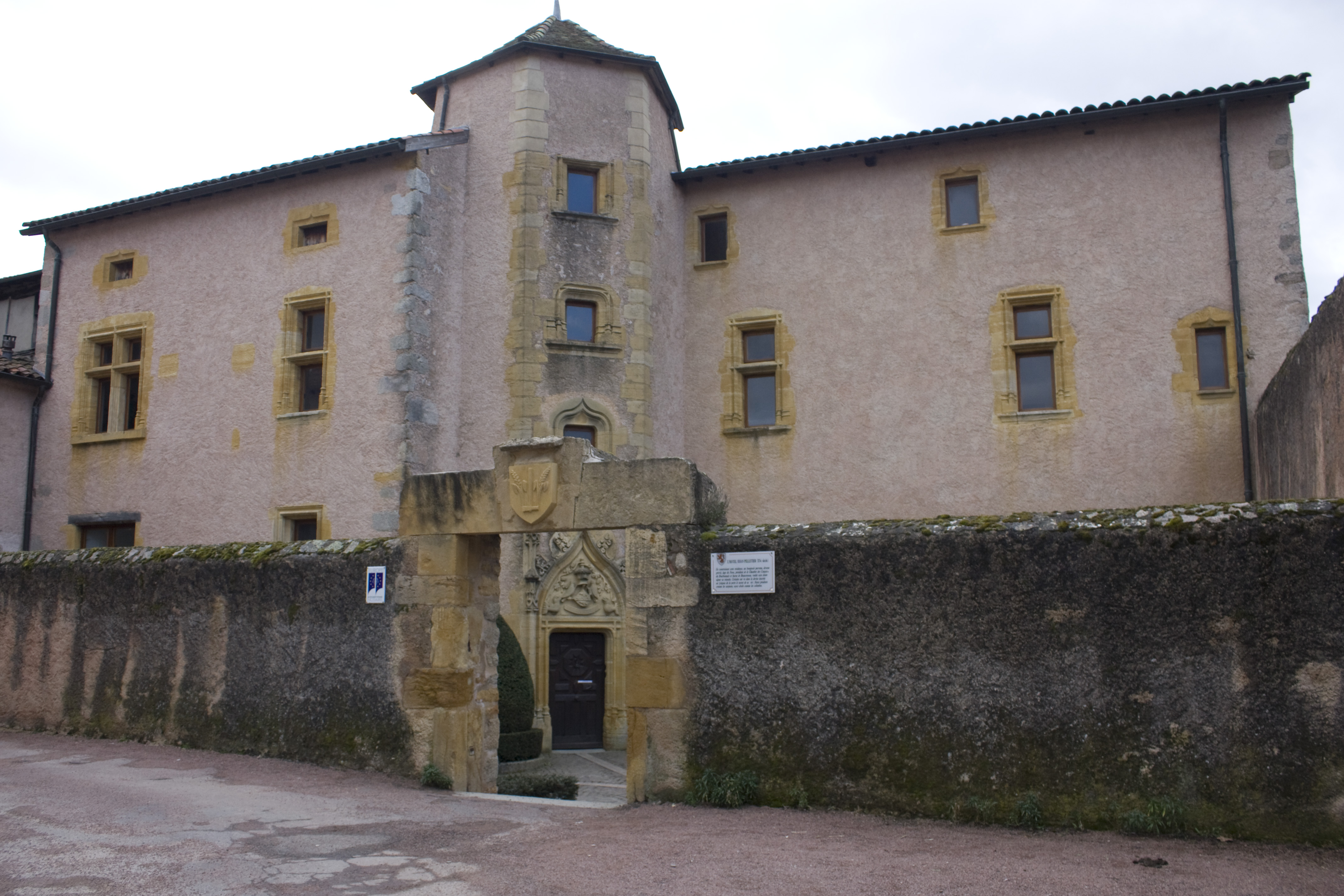
- Hôtel Jehan Pelletier

- Coat of arms
- Location of Saint-Haon-le-Châtel
- Location within France Location within Auvergne-Rhône-Alpes
- Coordinates: 46°04′00″N 3°54′57″E
- Country: France
- Region: Auvergne-Rhône-Alpes
- Department: Loire
- Arrondissement: Roanne
- Canton: Renaison
- Intercommunality: Roannais Agglomération

Government
  - Mayor (2020–2026): Gilbert Magnaud
- Area^{1}: 0.8 km^{2} (0.31 sq mi)
- Elevation: 420 m (1,380 ft)
- Highest elevation: 463 m (1,519 ft)
- Lowest elevation: 363 m (1,191 ft)
- Population (2023): 625
  - Density: 780/km^{2} (2,000/sq mi)
- Time zone: UTC+01:00 (CET)
  - Summer (DST): UTC+02:00 (CEST)
- INSEE/Postal code: 42232 /42370
- ^{1} French Land Register data, which excludes lakes, ponds, glaciers > 1 km^{2} (0.386 sq mi or 247 acres) and river estuaries.

Saint-Haon-le-Châtel (French pronunciation: [sɛ̃t‿ɑ̃ lə ʃatɛl]) is a commune in the Loire department in central France.

== Population ==
Historical population
Year	Pop.	±% p.a.
1968	392	—
1975	410	+0.64%
1982	439	+0.98%
1990	535	+2.50%
1999	570	+0.71%
2007	579	+0.20%
2012	605	+0.88%
2017	638	+1.07%
2023	625	−0.34%
Source: INSEE

== See also ==
- Communes of the Loire department
