= List of ambassadors of France to Guatemala =

This is a possibly incomplete list of French ambassadors to Guatemala.

== List ==
Date of Appointment	Name	Date of Dismissal
1947	Marc Millon de Peillon	1890
1950	Jacques Coiffard	1953
1953	Roger Robert du Gardier	1959
1959	Roger de Bercegol de Lile	1962
1962	Eugène Wernert	1971
1971	Henri Ruffin	1975
1975	René Lalouette	1980
1980	Louis Deblé	1984
1984	André Le Guen	1988
1988	Jean Mazéo	1991
1991	Paul Poudade	1993
1993	Charles Crettien	1996
1996	Serge Pinot	2000
2000	Gilles Vidal Citroën	2005
2005	Norbert Carrasco-Saulnier	2008
2008	Michèle Ramis-Plum	2010
2010	Philip Bastelica	2013
2013	Philip Frank	2015
2015	Jean-Hugues Simon-Michel	2018
2018	Jean-Francois Charpentier	2021
2021	Odile Russel	

== Quellen ==
- ambafrance-gt.org
- diplomatie.gouv.fr
