= Philippe Rebeyrol =

French diplomat

Philippe Rebeyrol (1917–2013) was a French diplomat. He was ambassador to Greece from 1980 to 1981.

Rebeyrol was a lifelong friend of Roland Barthes. He maintained an interest in intellectual matters, writing on Baudelaire, Manet and Spinoza.

Rebeyrol's papers are held at the Institute for Contemporary Publishing Archives and at the french Diplomatical Archives.
