= Jacques Huntzinger =

Ambassador of France to Israel
- In office 1999–2003
- President: Jacques Chirac
- Succeeded by: Gérard Araud

Personal details
- Born: 8 January 1943 (age 83) Boulogne-Billancourt, France
- Education: Lycée Henri-IV
- Alma mater: Sciences Po; Faculty of Law of Paris
- Profession: Diplomat

Jacques Gabriel Huntzinger (born 8 January 1943) is a former French ambassador to Israel, Estonia (1991–1994), and Macedonia (1996–1999), and has served as an ambassador at large for the Mediterranean Union and the Task Force for International Cooperation on Holocaust Education, Remembrance, and Research. Huntzinger was born in the Paris suburb of Boulogne-Billancourt. He was a member of the Socialist Party in the 1980s. From February 1983 to September 1985, Huntzinger was a vice president of the Confederation of Socialist Parties of the European Community and chair of its manifesto working group. During the 1980s, he was also instrumental in transitioning the French Socialist Party from a disarmament to an anti-totalitarian position.

During the late 1990s, Huntzinger was the French ambassador to Macedonia and was heavily involved in international efforts to address various Balkan issues, including the Kosovo War.

At the request of François Mitterrand, Huntzinger organized initial "Mediterranean Forums" for non-governmental entities from Algeria, France, Italy, Morocco, Portugal, Spain, and Tunisia. These forums were held during February 1988 (Marseilles) and May 1989 (Tangier) and resulted in the creation of the 5+5 Dialogue of the Western Mediterranean Forum for foreign ministers from Algeria, France, Italy, Libya, Malta, Mauritania, Morocco, Portugal, Spain, and Tunisia. Huntzinger was instrumental in organizing the first 5+5 Dialogue held in 1990. This effort was dampened by the Gulf War, Algerian Civil War and the Lockerbie and UTA airplane bombings, but the 5+5 Dialogue has recovered to become a significant regional forum. Huntzinger also coordinated the Mediterranean Cultural Forum in 2008 and engaged in numerous other efforts to encourage dialogue among Mediterranean constituents.

Jacques Huntzinger currently serves as president of the Lyrique en Mer/Festival de Belle Île.

Jacques Huntzinger is the great-nephew of Charles Huntzinger, the French general who negotiated the 1940 armistice with Germany.
