= Theobald Piscatory =

French diplomat (1800–1872)

Théobald Émile Arcambal-Piscatory
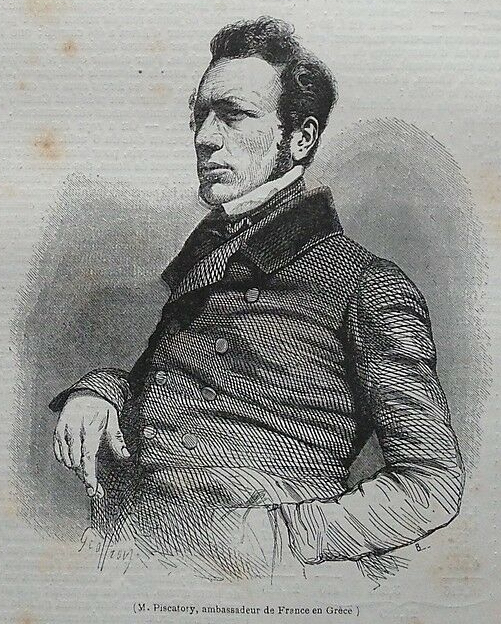

French diplomat to Greece
- In office June 1841 – March 1848

Representative for the Département of Indre-et-Loire
- In office 13 May 1849 – 1851

Personal details
- Born: 6 April 1800 France
- Died: 18 November
- Occupation: Diplomat

Théobald Émile Arcambal-Piscatory (6 April 1800 in Paris – 18 November 1870 in Paris) was a French statesman and diplomat.

== Life ==
=== Early life ===
The son of François Hyacinthe Arcambal (an employee of the French ministry of war) and of Thérèse Rosalie Pélagie Deshayes, Piscatory was born on 6 April 1800. He was adopted by Antoine Pierre Piscatory and took his name.

A fervent hellenophile, Piscatory left France in 1825 to take part in the Greek War of Independence. It was in Greece that he met and befriended Kolettis, then head of the Greek government from and future Greek ambassador to Louis Philippe I (1835–1844). Piscatory returned to France on 7 August 1826 with General Fabvier.

=== Politician ===
Piscatory was the conservative candidate to the Chambre des députés in 1831 in the second collège of Indre-et-Loire (Tours). He received 72 votes, losing to César Joseph Bacot (who received 288 votes).

=== Diplomat ===
His diplomatic career began in 1841 - from June to September, Guizot, then French foreign minister, sent him to travel throughout Greece. His mission was to assure the Greek leaders of French support for their cause and influence in the region, to assess Greece's progress since the arrival of Otto I, and to check whether or not France should deliver the third installment of the loan it had agreed to pay Greece. It was on this trip that Piscatory renounced his former acquaintances and to prove himself as a diplomat. Guizot was satisfied by Piscatory's services and made him France's minister plenipotentiary to the king of Greece in April 1843.

In September 1843, a coup broke out in Greece, forcing Otto to promise to convene a national assembly to create a Greek constitution. Piscatory was most likely not at the forefront of the movement, but still played an important role. In the days following the coup, he went to the royal palace several times and insisted that Otto not renege on his promises. After a short and fruitless attempt at rapprochement with the British ambassador Edmund Lyons, Piscatory followed a policy of actively supporting Kolettis' government from its formation onward and managed to effectively counterbalance British influence.

Piscatory continued to satisfy his government and was made a peer of France on 21 July 1846 and a commander of the Légion d'honneur on 31 August 1846—a year in which French influence in Greece gave rise to the new and powerful instrument thanks to Piscatory's efforts and those of the French education minister comte de Salvandy.

Upon the death of Kolettis, Piscatory requested to be recalled to France. The French government instead moved him to replace comte Bresson as ambassador to Madrid on 10 December 1847. The French Revolution of 1848 stopped him taking up this post and the appointment was revoked by the provisional French government on 11 March 1848.

=== Second Republic ===
Piscatory attempted to follow a political career under the Second French Republic and was elected representative for the département of Indre-et-Loire in the Assemblée législative on 13 May 1849. He was one of the most active members of the majority, belonging to the rue de Poitiers committee. Piscatory supported the Rome expedition, the Falloux law on education, 31 May 1850 electoral law (for which he was on the planning commission), and the revision of the French constitution. He took part in the commission for public assistance and foresight, presided over by Thiers.

Piscatory was one of the representatives who gathered in the town hall of the tenth arrondissement of Paris to protest the 2 December 1851 coup. This forced him to leave politics once and for all. He did, however, retain links with Guizot and joined him in 1867 in forming a Greek committee in support of the Cretan insurgents.

== Sources ==
- "Théobald Piscatory", in Robert and Cougny, Dictionnaire des parlementaires français, 1889
