= Marc Bonnefous =

French diplomat (1924–2002)

Personal details
- Born: Bordeaux, France
- Died: November 5, 2002 (aged 78)

Marc Bonnefous (5 January 1924, Bordeaux - 5 November 2002) was a French diplomat who served as an ambassador in Brazzaville and Tel Aviv.

== Life ==
Marc Bonnefous was born to Renée Teillac and Henri Bonnefous and married Monique Lesbegueris in 1946.

He attended the Lycée de Bordeaux. He studied law at the Faculty of Law in Bordeaux and at the ENA.
