= Embassy of France, Tokyo =

French Embassy, Tokyo
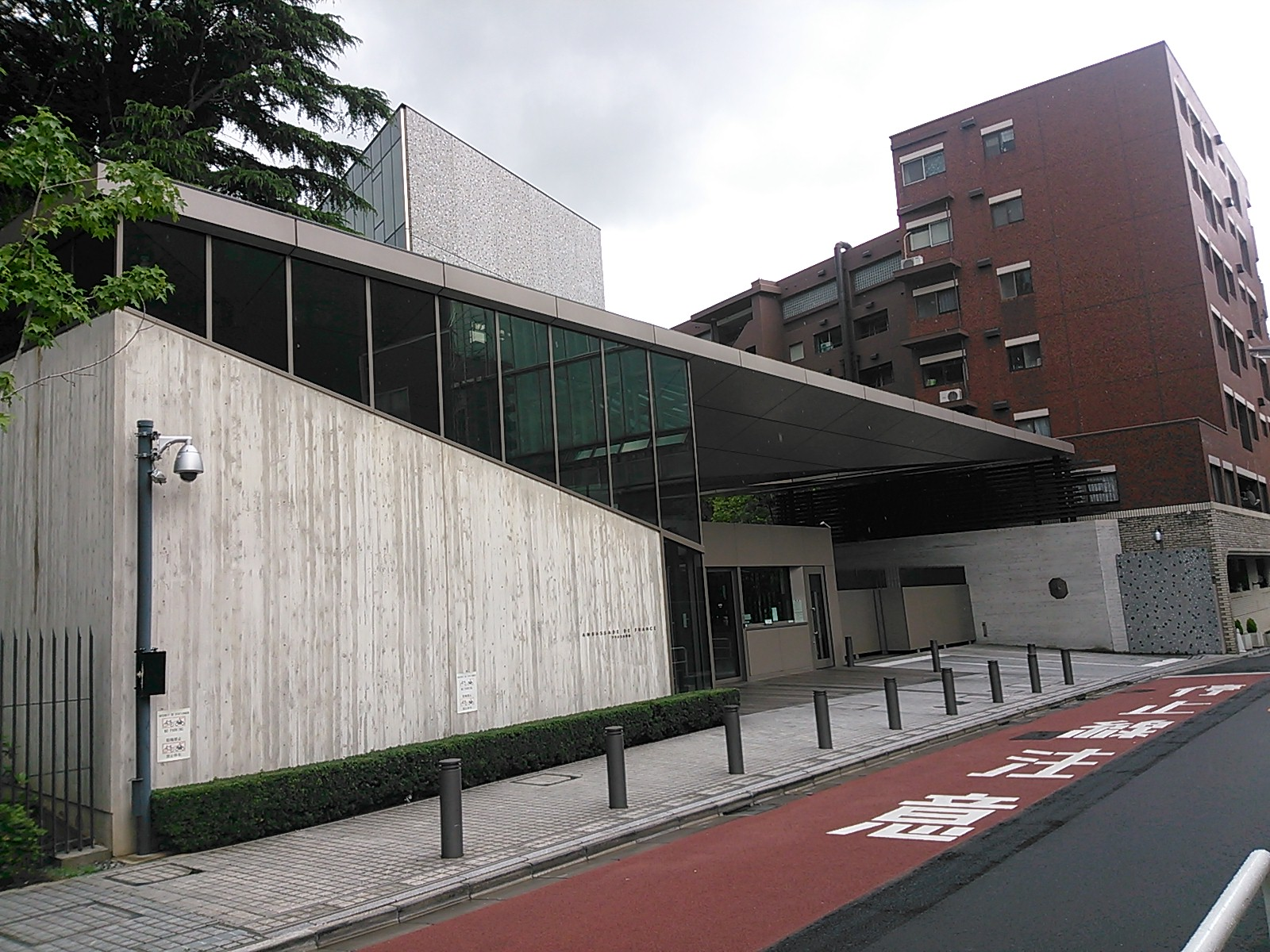
- Entrance to the embassy
- Location: Tokyo, Japan
- Address: 4-1-44, Minami-Azabu, Minato-ku, Tokyo
- Coordinates: 35°38′52″N 139°43′35″E
- Ambassador: Philippe Setton
- Website: Office Website

The French Embassy, Tokyo, is the chief diplomatic mission of France in Japan. Since September 2020, its ambassador has been Philippe Setton.

== History ==
The first embassy was established in Iidabashi near the Imperial Palace. It was cramped and was damaged by the aftershocks from an earthquake that shook Tokyo in 1922 and 1923.

The embassy was then moved to the exclusive district of Minami-Azabu. The buildings were destroyed during Allied bombing at the end of World War II. It was not until 1972 that the French State acquired the land.

== French community ==
As of December 31, 2016, there were 9,722 French nationals registered with the embassy. As of December 31, 2014, 7,561 registrants were distributed between two constituencies: Tokyo (6,055) and Kyoto (1,506). The French community in Japan consists mainly of executives or managers of companies, artisans, creators, teachers and researchers.

== Recent ambassadors of France to Japan ==
From	To	Ambassador
1966	1972	Louis de Guiringaud
1972	1975	François Lefebvre de Laboulaye
1975	1977	Jean-Pierre Brunet
1977	1979	Louis Dauge
1979	1982	Xavier Daufresne de La Chevalerie
1982	1985	André Ross
1985	1987	Gilbert Pérol
1987	1991	Bernard Dorin
1991	1993	Loïc Hennekinne
1993	1998	Jean-Bernard Ouvrieu
1998	2002	Maurice Gourdault-Montagne
2002	2006	Bernard Faubournet de Montferrand
2006	2007	Gildas Le Lidec
2007	2011	Philippe Faure
2011	2014	Christian Masset
2014	2017	Thierry Dana
2017	2020	Laurent Pic
2020	to present	Philippe Setton

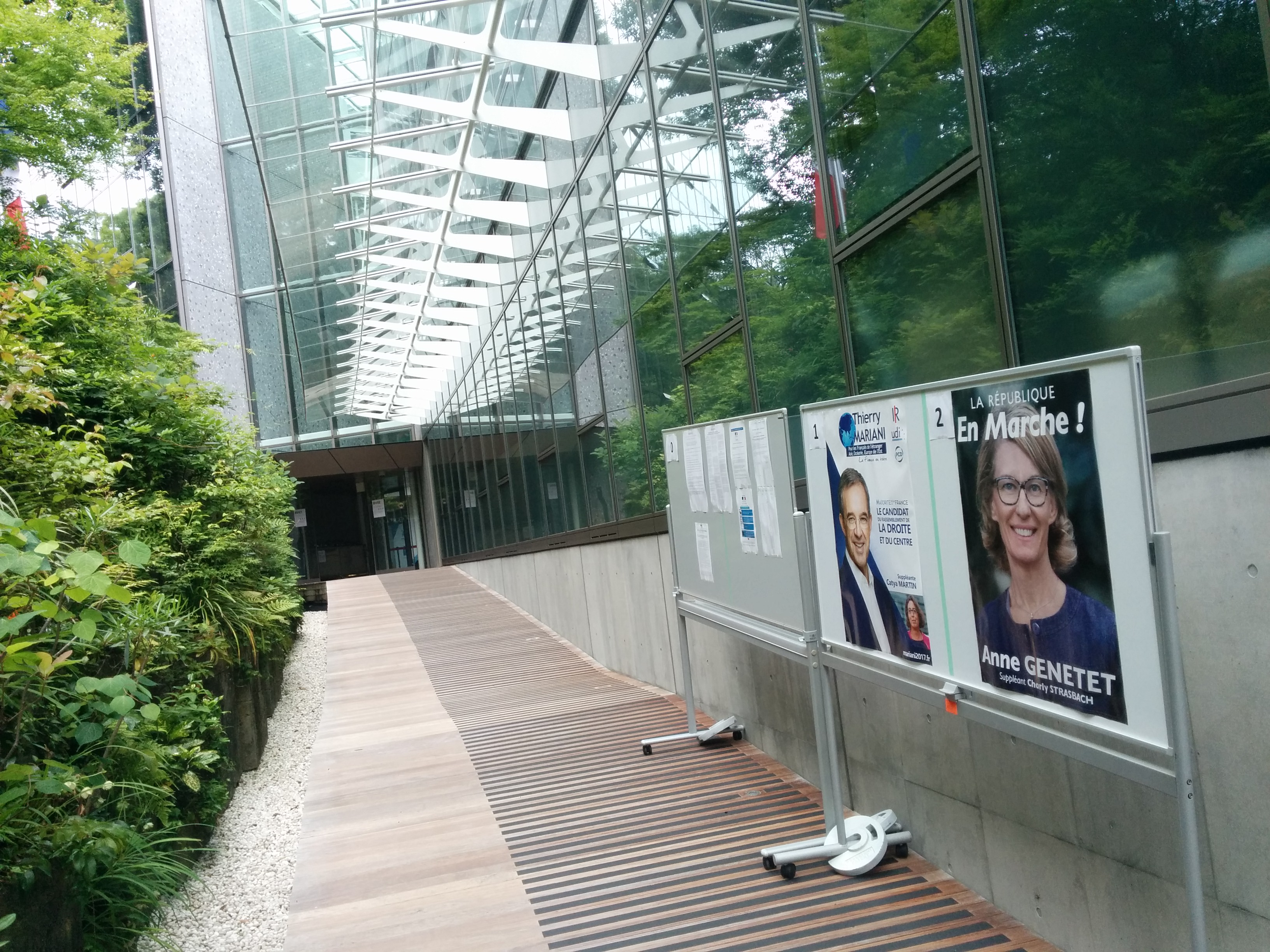
Passageway inside the embassy

== Access ==
The embassy is a 7-minute walk from exit 3 of Hiroo Station on the Hibiya Line operated by Tokyo Metro.

== See also ==
- Japan–France relations
- List of Ambassadors of France to Japan
- List of diplomatic missions of France
- List of diplomatic missions in Japan
- French people in Japan
