= List of ambassadors of France to Japan =

French Ambassador to Japan
- Incumbent; Philippe Setton since 2020
- Inaugural holder: Jean Daridan
- Formation: 1961 5th Republic

The list of ambassadors of France to Japan began developing in the same year that the American Commodore Perry "opened" Japan's doors to the West.

Franco-Japanese diplomatic relations were initially established during the Second Empire of French history and the Edo period of Japanese history.

== List of heads of mission ==
=== Ambassadors of the Second Empire ===
Head of mission	Tenure begins	Tenure ends	French head of state	Japanese emperor
Jean-Baptiste Louis Gros	1858	1858	Napoleon III	Kōmei
Charles de Chassiron	1858	1859	Napoleon III	Kōmei
Gustave Duchesne de Bellecourt	1859	1863	Napoleon III	Kōmei
Léon Roches	1863	1868	Napoleon III	Kōmei
Maxime Outrey	1868	1871	Napoleon III	Meiji

=== Ambassadors of the Third Republic ===
Head of mission	Tenure begins	Tenure ends	French head of state	Japanese emperor
Paul Louis de Turenne	1871	1872	Adolphe Thiers	Meiji
Paul Louis de Turenne	1872	1890	Patrice Mac-Mahon; Jules Grévy	Meiji
Joseph Adam Sienkiewicz	1890	1892	Sadi Carnot	Meiji
Jules Harmand	1894	1905	Jean Casimir-Perier; Félix Faure; Émile Loubet	Meiji
Gaston Raindre	1905	1909	Armand Fallières	Meiji
Auguste Gérard	1909	1914	Armand Fallières	Taishō
Eugène Regnault	1914	1918	Raymond Poincaré	Taishō
Roger Maugras (chargé d'affaires)	1918	1919	Raymond Poincaré	Taishō
Edmond Bapst	1919	1921	Paul Deschanel; Alexandre Millerand; Gaston Doumergue; Paul Doumer	Taishō
Paul Claudel	1921	1927	Paul Deschanel; Alexandre Millerand; Gaston Doumergue; Paul Doumer	Taishō
Robert de Billy	1927	1929	Paul Deschanel; Alexandre Millerand; Gaston Doumergue; Paul Doumer	Shōwa
Alfred de Martel	1929	1933	Paul Deschanel; Alexandre Millerand; Gaston Doumergue; Paul Doumer	Shōwa
Fernand Pila	1935	1936	Albert Lebrun; Henri Pétain	Shōwa
Charles Arsène-Henry	1937	1943	Albert Lebrun; Henri Pétain	Shōwa

=== Ambassadors of the Fourth Republic ===
Head of mission	Tenure begins	Tenure ends	French head of state	Japanese emperor
Zinovi Pechkoff	1946	1950	Vincent Auriol	Shōwa
Maurice Dejean	1950	1953	Vincent Auriol	Shōwa
Daniel Lévi	1953	1956	Vincent Auriol	Shōwa
Armand Bérard	1956	1959	René Coty	Shōwa

=== Ambassadors of the Fifth Republic ===
Head of mission	Tenure begins	Tenure ends	French head of state	Japanese emperor
Jean Daridan	1959	1961	Charles de Gaulle	Shōwa
Étienne Dennery	1961	1964	Charles de Gaulle	Shōwa
François Missoffe	1964	1966	Charles de Gaulle	Shōwa
Louis de Guiringaud	1966	1972	Georges Pompidou	Shōwa
François Lefebvre de Laboulaye	1972	1975	Valéry Giscard d'Estaing	Shōwa
Jean-Pierre Brunet	1975	1977	Valéry Giscard d'Estaing	Shōwa
Louis Dauge	1977	1979	Valéry Giscard d'Estaing	Shōwa
Xavier Daufresne de la Chevalerie	1979	1982	François Mitterrand	Shōwa
André Ross	1982	1985	François Mitterrand	Shōwa
Gilbert Pérol	1985	1987	François Mitterrand	Shōwa
Bernard Dorin	1987	1991	François Mitterrand	Akihito
Loïc Hennekinne	1991	1993	François Mitterrand	Akihito
Jean-Bernard Ouvrieu	1993	1998	Jacques Chirac	Akihito
Maurice Gourdault-Montagne	1998	2002	Jacques Chirac	Akihito
Bernard Faubournet de Montferrand	2002	2006	Jacques Chirac	Akihito
Gildas Le Lidec	2006	2007	Jacques Chirac	Akihito
Philippe Faure	2007	2011	Nicolas Sarkozy	Akihito
Christian Masset	2011	2014	Francois Hollande	Akihito
Thierry Dana	2014	2017	Francois Hollande	Akihito
Laurent Pic	2017	2020	Emmanuel Macron	Akihito
Philippe Setton	2020		Emmanuel Macron	Naruhito

== See also ==
- Treaty of Amity and Commerce between France and Japan
