= Gildas Le Lidec =

French diplomat (1947–2025)

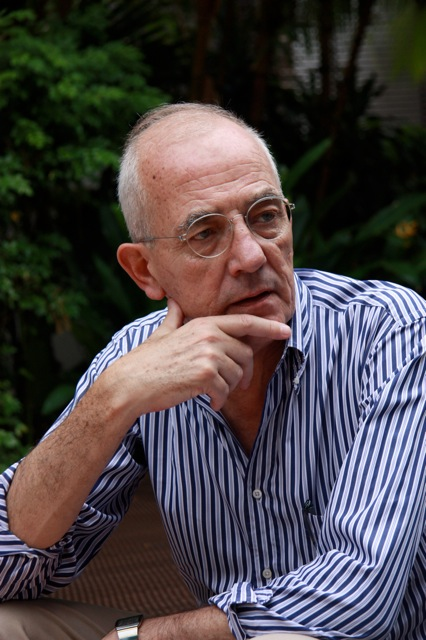
- Le Lidec in 2010

Ambassador of France to Thailand
- In office 2009–2012
- President: Nicolas Sarkozy
- Preceded by: Laurent Bili
- Succeeded by: Thierry Viteau

Ambassador of France to Madagascar
- In office 2008
- President: Nicolas Sarkozy
- Preceded by: Alain Le Roy
- Succeeded by: Jean-Marc Chataigner

Ambassador of France to Japan
- In office 2006–2007
- President: Jacques Chirac; Nicolas Sarkozy
- Preceded by: Bernard de Faubournet de Montferrand
- Succeeded by: Philippe Faure

Ambassador of France to Ivory Coast
- In office 2002–2005
- President: Jacques Chirac
- Preceded by: Renaud Vignal
- Succeeded by: André Janier

Ambassador of France to the Democratic Republic of the Congo
- In office 1999–2002
- President: Jacques Chirac
- Preceded by: Michel Rougagnou
- Succeeded by: Georges Serre

Ambassador of France to Cambodia
- In office 1994–1998
- President: François Mitterrand; Jacques Chirac
- Preceded by: Philippe Coste
- Succeeded by: André-Jean Libourel

Personal details
- Born: 14 April 1947 Bangui, Ubangi-Shari, French Equatorial Africa
- Died: 11 October 2025 (aged 78)
- Education: Sciences Po; Institut national des langues et civilisations orientales
- Occupation: Diplomat

Gildas Le Lidec (French: [ʒildas lə lidɛk]; 14 April 1947 – 11 October 2025) was a French diplomat.

== Life and career ==
Le Lidec studied at the Sciences Po and the Institut national des langues et civilisations orientales. His first plenipotentiary role came in 1994 when he was appointed Ambassador to Cambodia, serving until 1998. He also briefly served as ambassador to the Central African Republic in 1998. He was Ambassador to the Democratic Republic of the Congo from 1999 to 2002 and Ambassador to Ivory Coast from 2002 to 2005. From 2005 to 2007, he was Ambassador to Japan. He was briefly Ambassador to Madagascar in 2008, but he was expelled back to France by President Marc Ravalomanana for "obscure" reasons. Lastly, he was Ambassador to Thailand from 2009 to 2012.

Le Lidec died on 11 October 2025, at the age of 78.

== Distinctions ==
- Officer of the Ordre national du Mérite (2001)
- Officer of the Legion of Honour (2008)

== Book ==
- De Phnom Penh à Abidjan, fragments de vie d’un diplomate (2014)
