= Max Touret =

French painter

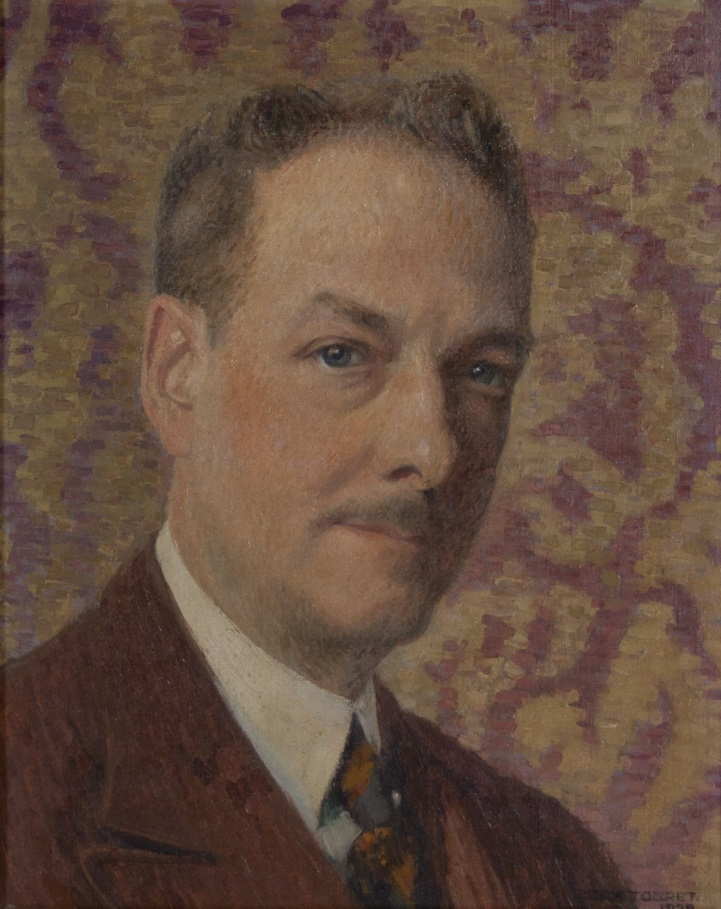
- Selfportrait (1920s)
- Born: Max Touret de Saint Genis; May 27, 1872; Versailles, France
- Died: February 26, 1963 (aged 90); Viroflay, France
- Known for: Painting
- Movement: Postimpressionism, pointillism
- Patrons: Émile Beaume

Max Touret (1872-1963) was a French engineer and painter, who worked in the United States and in Normandy.

== Early life ==
Max Touret was born on May 26, 1872, in Versailles, the only son of Jean-Eugène Touret, engineer, and Jehanne-Aimé Smitt de Saint Genis. The grandfather is Jacques-François-Augustin Touret (1805-1885), former prefect and Inspector General of the French Railways.

In 1876, Jean-Eugène Touret and his family moved to Philadelphia: commercial engineer, the father of Max represents several French industrial companies including Ferdinand Arbey (Paris), major manufacturer of machine tools, exhibited in the French Pavilion designed by Armand Moisant during the Centennial Exposition of Arts, Manufactures and Products of the Soil and Mine, in Philadelphia International Exhibition celebrating the centennial of the founding of the United States. The family decides to stay in America and settle in New York City. In 1877, Jean-Eugène Touret filed a series of patents, for machines to knead bread, to make biscuits, and chocolate. He joins the brewer origin Henry Maillard who owned among others a prestigious boutique on Fifth Avenue. The Touret family lives at 55 West 25th Street. Max’mother, very much in love with art, takes her son to visit the museums and exhibitions in the region, such as the Boston Foreign Exhibition of 1883 and especially the "Works in Oil an Pastel by The Impressionnists of the Paris" (1886), organized by Paul Durand-Ruel, who opens the following year a gallery in New York. Max's father died that year, aged 46, and his mother decided to return to France.

== Back to US, Great War and paintings ==
Located in Paris, rue Margueritte, Max joined the lycée Janson de Sailly, then the Ecole Centrale from which he graduated in 1896. He returned to the United States, resume the business of his father he develops. In 1902, he was named associate of the American Institute of Electricity and the American Institute of American Engineer. It is part of the Fencing Circle with the Sword (Paris, 1904). Mobilized in August 1914 as a second lieutenant at the 22nd artillery regiment, he worked in the Tardieu mission[7] in US aid to the armies of the front and became a member of the French High Commission in the United States which prepares for the entry into the war in April 1917 of the Americans. During his diplomatic stay in Washington D.C., which lasted three years, he began painting (Views of the Potomac) and, despite the Armistice, remained mobilized in the federal capital until December 1919.

== The painter ==
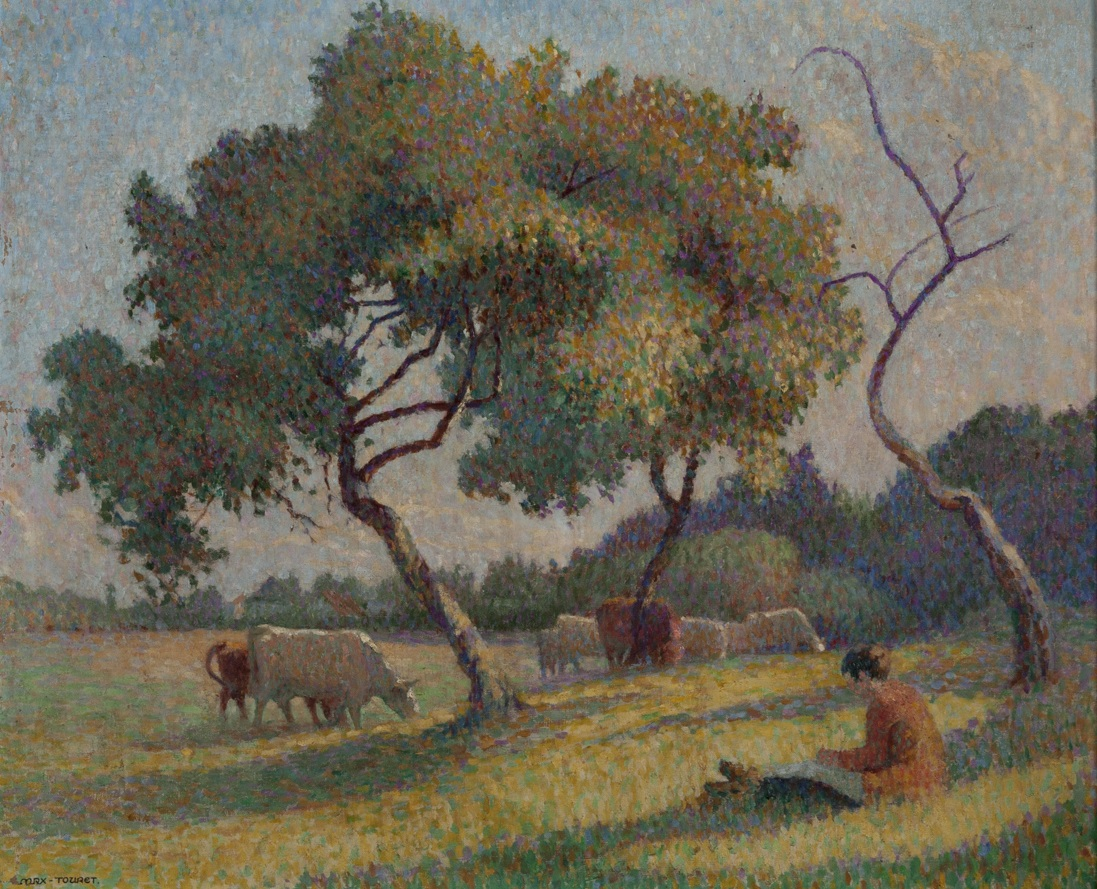
Paysage normand, oil on canvas, 1920s.

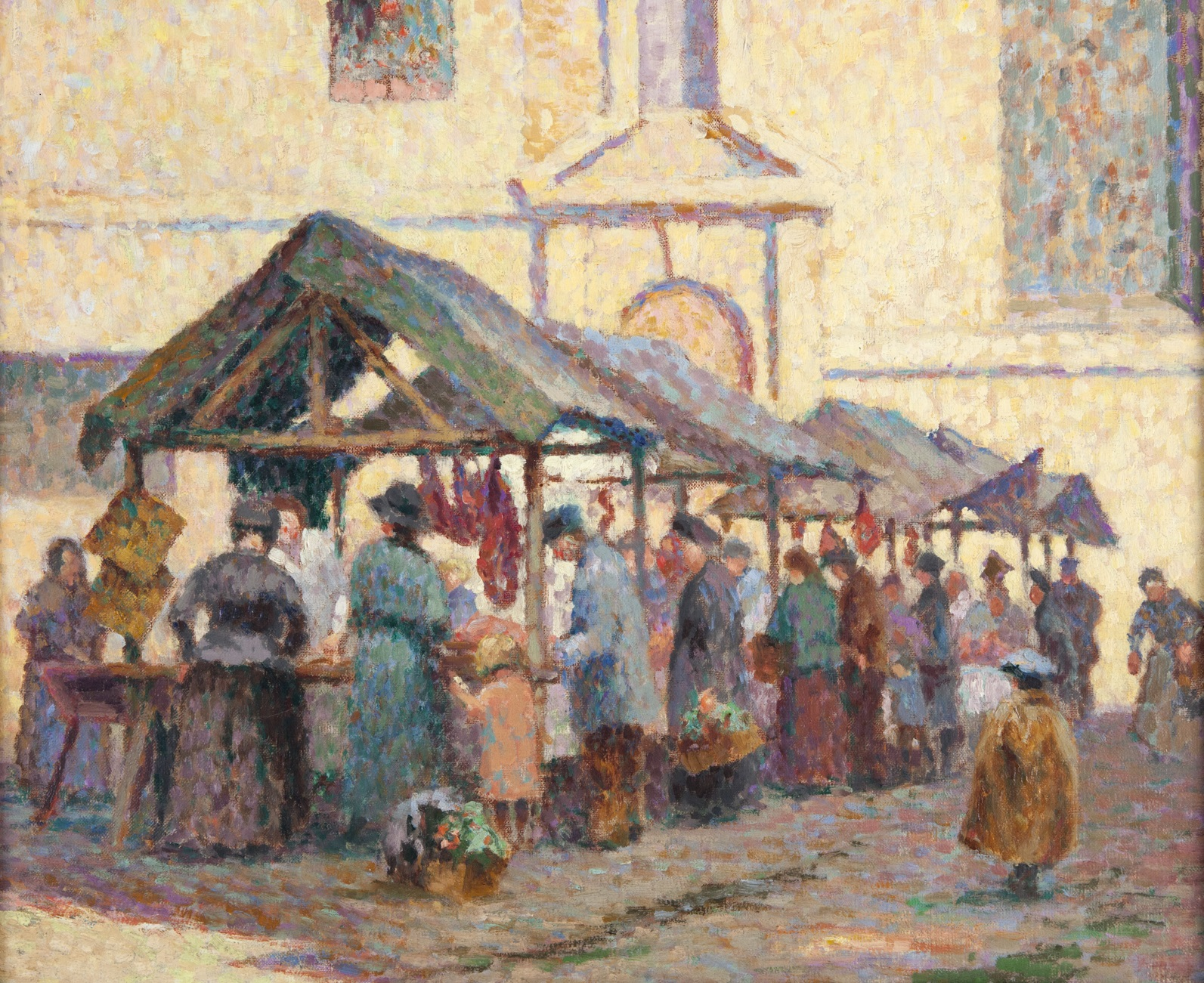
Scène de marché à Caudebec-lès-Elbeuf, oil on canvas, 1920s.

Max Touret was trained in the art of painting both because of his mother's strong taste for the modern school and his own knowledge and friendship in the art world. He likes the work of the Pointillists. Before the war, he attended the French painter Émile Beaume's workshop, which he told himself to be a student. In 1920, he joined the Volnay Artistic and Literary Circle where he exhibited. His young cousin whom he was very close to and which he will offer many connections to American collectors, the sculptor Charles Georges Cassou, pushes him to exhibit his paintings, many landscapes. Max is also close since 1900 to the architect Julia Morgan. He moved to a Parisian workshop at 41 rue Bayen with the painter Pierre-Ludovic Dumas (1892-?). He joined the Société des Artistes Français and began exhibiting regularly at the Salon until 1936.

The 1930s marked a change in the inspiration of Max Touret. At the birth of his first daughter Gisèle, he moved with his set up a new workshop. He also makes many trips to the Villa Maltournée, near Honfleur. He then composes nudes and refined Japanese or oriental interiors. Many paintings were stored in his house in Normandy, when, in 1941, the German forces commandeered the house and destroyed the contents, much of which was stolen.

Max Touret died on February 26, 1963, in Viroflay.

In the early 2010s, paintings of the painter are found by his family: many landscapes, some portraits, history paintings inspired by America, nudes, still lifes, indoor scenes. Exhibitions are then organized, to get out of oblivion the French artist. A catalog was published in 2018.

== Exhibitions ==
From June to September 2023, the musée Eugène-Boudin in Honfleur presents Max Touret. Le désir du motif, about 76 oils on canvas and published a catalogue.

From March 17th to May 23th, 2026, the Marubeni Gallery of Tokyo presents Max Touret. A Hitherto Unknown Master of Post-Impressionism, an exhibition organized with the support of the French Embassy in Japan.
