= Boulaye =

Boulaye may refer to

- Boulaye (name)
- La Boulaye, a commune in eastern France
- Fort De La Boulaye Site, a fort built by the French in south Louisiana, U.S., in 1699–1700
