= Boulaye (name) =

Boulaye is a name that may refer to the following notable people:

- Boulaye Dia (born 1996), French football player
- André Lefebvre de La Boulaye (1876–1966), French Ambassador in Washington
- Agathe de La Boulaye, French film and television actress
- Patti Boulaye (born 1954), British-Nigerian singer, actress and artist
