= Bernard de Faubournet de Montferrand =

French diplomat (born 1945)

Bernard de Faubournet de Montferrand (born 6 August 1945), known as Bernard de Montferrand, is a French retired diplomat and politician. He served as the French Ambassador to Singapore, the Netherlands, India, Japan and Germany.

== Biography ==
Bernard de Faubournet de Montferrand was born on August 6, 1945, in Gironde to Colonel Bertrand de Faubournet de Montferrand and Jeanne Roche de la Rigodière. He is married to Catherine Bellet de Tavernost, and has three children, Hadrien, Raphaël and Pauline. He owns the Château de Montréal in Issac, Dordogne.

On the occasion of the 2017 presidential election, he was one of the 60 diplomats who supported Emmanuel Macron.

== Career ==
=== Diplomatic career ===
From 1979 to 1982, he was adviser for administrative, economic and financial affairs to the French military government in Berlin. He was Ambassador of France to Singapore from 1989 to 1993, Ambassador of France to the Netherlands from 1995 to 2000, Ambassador of France to India from 2000 to 2002, Ambassador of France to Japan from 2003 to 2006, and Ambassador of France to Germany from 2007 to 2011.

=== Political career ===
Bernard de Faubournet de Montferrand was a candidate for the Rally for The Republic in the legislative elections of 1978 and 1980 and in the 1994 cantonal elections in the Dordogne in the canton of Villamblard.

From 1986 to 1988, he was chief of staff to the Minister for Cooperation Michel Aurillac. From 1993 to 1995, he was diplomatic adviser to Prime Minister Édouard Balladur.
