= Name of Montreal =

Etymology of the city in Quebec, Canada

There are some hypotheses concerning the origin of the name of the city of Montreal. The best-known is that it is a variant of "Mount Royal".

== Hypotheses ==
Among the hypotheses concerning the origin of Montreal's name, the most acceptable to toponymy is that it is a variant of "Mount Royal". In the 16th century réal was a variant of royal, hence the contraction of Mont Royal that gave Mont Réal or Montreal.

Historian Marcel Trudel asked: "Where does the name 'Mount Royal' come from? In honour of Cardinal de Medici, Archbishop of Monreale? In honour of Claude de Pontbriand, son of the Seigneur of Montreal? Or simply in honour of the king? No explanation has been given." Claude de Pontbriand (landlord of the Château de Montréal in France) accompanied Jacques Cartier on his expedition up the Saint Lawrence River and was with him on October 3, 1535, when he reached Hochelaga, on the site of the present-day city of Montreal.

The name Montreal referred first to the mountain, then to the island and finally to the city itself.

== Ville-Marie ==
The original name for the settlement that would later become Montreal was Ville-Marie. When the missionary society Société Notre-Dame de Montréal sent Paul Chomedey de Maisonneuve to found a city on the island of Montreal in 1642, they named the settlement Ville-Marie in honour of the Virgin, protectress of the venture. Nonetheless, from the very beginning both the settlement of Ville-Marie and the mountain were known as Montreal to many people, including some mapmakers of the period. In the 18th century, for no official reason, the name Montreal supplanted that of Ville-Marie. Up until then, the city was called either Montreal and/or Ville-Marie.

The name Ville-Marie now refers to the borough encompassing Old Montreal (the site of Fort Ville-Marie), as well as the downtown core and adjacent areas.

== Timeline ==
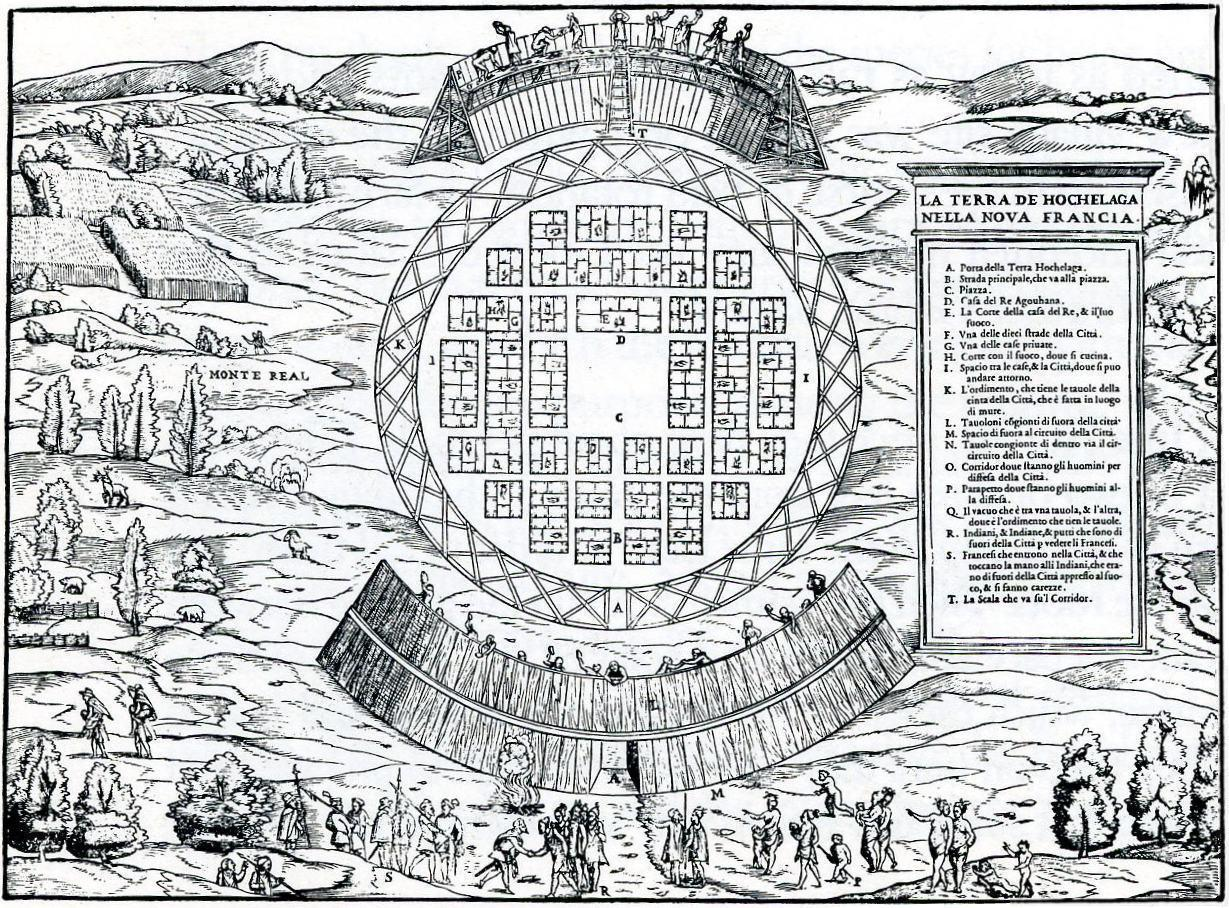
Map published in Venice by Ramusio. Based on account of Jacques Cartier

- In modern Iroquois, Montreal is called Tiohtià:ke. Other First Nations languages, such as Algonquin, refer to it as Moniang.
- 1535 – On October 3, Jacques Cartier climbed up the mountain and named it Mount Royal. He wrote: "Nous nommasmes icelle montaigne le mont Royal." (We named the said mountain Mount Royal.) The name Montreal is generally thought to be derived from "Mount Royal", the name given to the mountain by Cartier in 1535.
- 1556 – On his map of Hochelaga, Italian geographer Giovanni Battista Ramusio wrote Monte Real to designate Mount Royal.
- 1575 – In his Cosmographie universelle de tout le monde, historiographer François de Belleforest was the first to use the form Montréal with reference to this area. In translation, it reads: "Let us now look at Hochelaga... in the midst of the countryside is the village, or Cité royale, adjacent to a mountain on which farming is practiced. The Christians call this city Montreal...".
- 1601 – On his map, Guillaume Le Vasseur wrote Hochelaga for the inhabited area and called the hill Mont Royal.
- 1609 – Marc Lescarbot called the settlement "Hochelaga, ville des Sauvages".
- 1612 – On Champlain's map, the mountain is called Montreal.
- 1642 – The mission named Ville-Marie was built at Place Royale.
- 1705 – Montreal is now the official name for the city formerly named Ville-Marie.

== Nicknames ==
- MTL
- YUL (IATA airport code)
- 514 (telephone area code)* unofficial
- VDM (Ville de Montréal - City of Montreal)
- "The City of Saints" * unofficial
- "The City of a Hundred Steeples" (Mark Twain - 1881)
- "La Métropole"
- "Quebec's Metropolis"
- "Sin City" (During the period of Prohibition in the United States, it became well known as one of North America's "sin cities" due to its unparalleled nightlife.)
- "The City of Festivals" or "Festival City"
- "Paris of North America"
- “Mount Royal”
