= Loïc Hennekinne =

French diplomat (1940–2020)

Ambassador of France to Indonesia
- In office 1986–1989
- Preceded by: Jean Soulier
- Succeeded by: Patrick O'Cornesse

Ambassador of France to Japan
- In office 1991–1993
- Preceded by: Bernard Dorin
- Succeeded by: Jean-Bernard Ouvrieu

French Inspector General of Foreign Affairs
- In office 1993–1996
- Preceded by: Jacques Bernière
- Succeeded by: Daniel Contenay

Ambassador of France to Canada
- In office 1997–1998
- Preceded by: Alfred Siefer-Gaillardin
- Succeeded by: Denis Bauchard

Secretary General of the French Ministry of Foreign Affairs
- In office December 1998 – July 2002
- Preceded by: Bertrand Dufourcq
- Succeeded by: Hubert Colin de Verdière

Ambassador of France to Italy
- In office 2002–2005
- Preceded by: Jacques Blot
- Succeeded by: Yves Aubin de La Messuzière

Personal details
- Born: 20 September 1940 Bordeaux, France
- Died: 18 April 2020 (aged 79)
- Occupation: Government official

Loïc Hennekinne (20 September 1940 – 18 April 2020) was a French government official and diplomat.

== Biography ==
Hennekinne studied at Sciences Po and the École nationale d'administration in Paris. He was arrested in 1962 for attending a meeting of Patrie en Progrès.

He was an advisor to French Foreign Minister Roland Dumas from 1988 to 1989, then a diplomatic advisor to President François Mitterrand from 1989 to 1991.

Hennekinne served numerous French ambassadorial roles, including in Indonesia, Japan, Canada, and Italy. He also served as Inspector General and Secretary General of the Ministry of Foreign Affairs.

After the end of his public career, Hennekinne joined the Fondation Res Publica, founded by Jean-Pierre Chevènement, and was on its scientific council. He served as an advisor to Arnaud Montebourg during the 2017 French Socialist Party presidential primary on foreign policy issues.

== Distinctions ==
- Ambassadeur de France (1999)
- Officer of the Ordre national du Mérite (1998)
- Commander of the Legion of Honour (2007)
