= Issac, Dordogne =

Issac
- Commune
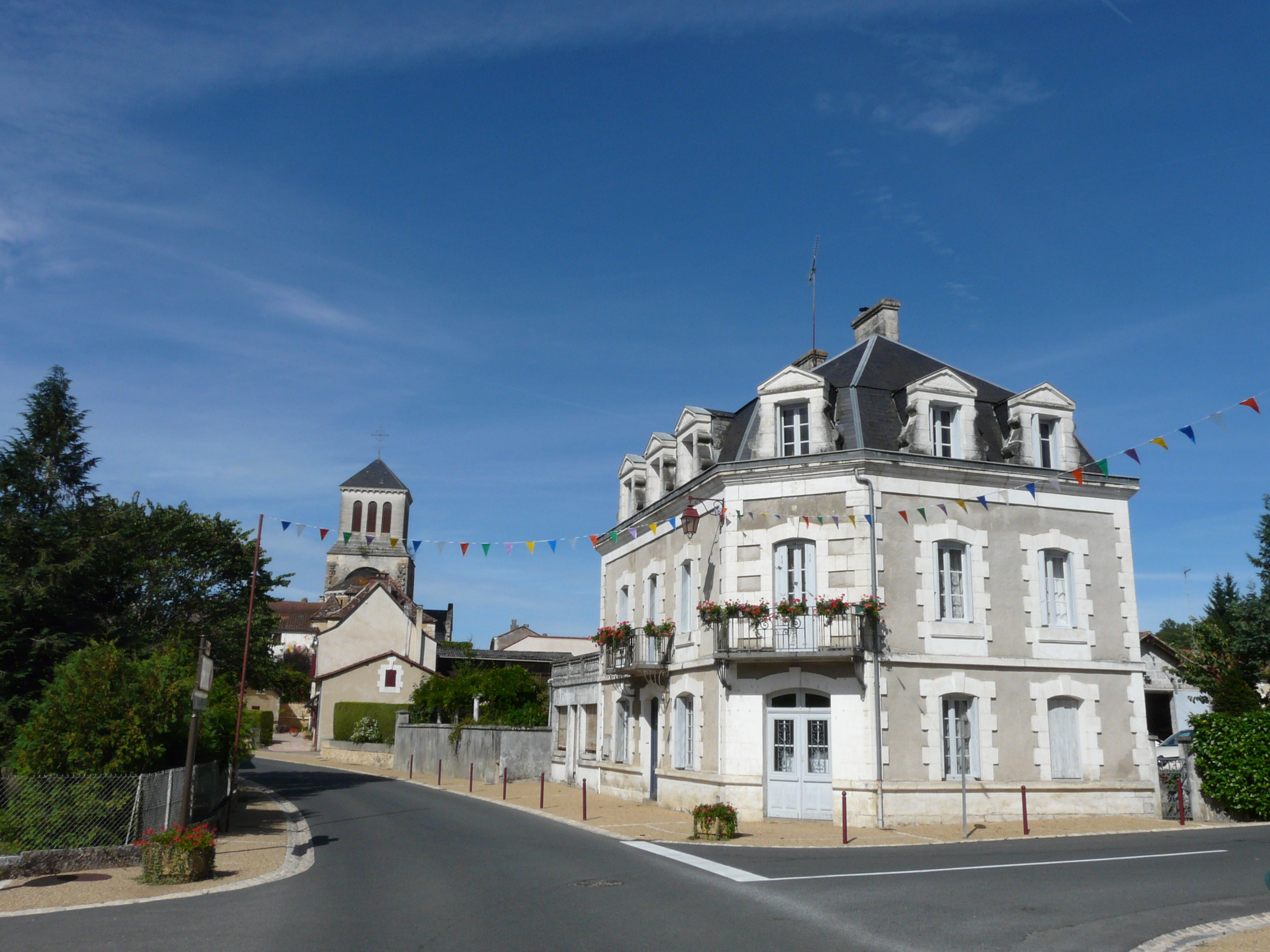
- A view within Issac

- Coat of arms
- Location of Issac
- Location within France Location within Nouvelle-Aquitaine
- Coordinates: 45°00′58″N 0°27′06″E
- Country: France
- Region: Nouvelle-Aquitaine
- Department: Dordogne
- Arrondissement: Périgueux
- Canton: Périgord Central

Government
  - Mayor (2020–2026): Jean Claude Lopez
- Area^{1}: 23.32 km^{2} (9.00 sq mi)
- Elevation: 78 m (256 ft)
- Highest elevation: 202 m (663 ft)
- Lowest elevation: 57 m (187 ft)
- Population (2023): 437
  - Density: 18.7/km^{2} (48.5/sq mi)
- Time zone: UTC+01:00 (CET)
  - Summer (DST): UTC+02:00 (CEST)
- INSEE/Postal code: 24211 /24400
- ^{1} French Land Register data, which excludes lakes, ponds, glaciers > 1 km^{2} (0.386 sq mi or 247 acres) and river estuaries.

Issac (French pronunciation: [isak]; Occitan: Eiçac) is a commune in the Dordogne department in Nouvelle-Aquitaine in southwestern France.

== Population ==
Historical population
Year	Pop.	±% p.a.
1968	472	—
1975	408	−2.06%
1982	354	−2.01%
1990	389	+1.19%
1999	385	−0.11%
2007	370	−0.50%
2012	395	+1.32%
2017	445	+2.41%
2023	437	−0.30%
Source: INSEE

== Sights ==
The Château de Montréal, built in the 12th and 16th centuries.

== See also ==
- Communes of the Dordogne department
