= François Lefebvre de Laboulaye =

French diplomat (1917–1996)

François Lefebvre de Laboulaye (16 June 1917 – 28 August 1996) was a French diplomat. He was French Ambassador to Brazil from 1968 to 1972, to Japan from 1973 to 1975 and to the United States from 1977 to 1981.

== Life ==
Laboulaye was born in Washington in a family of diplomats, he is the son of André Lefebvre de La Boulaye, French Ambassador to the United States, and Marie Hély d'Oissel. His great-grand father was Edouard de Laboulaye who launched the movement to offer the Statue of Liberty to the United States. During his time as the ambassador to the United States, he was the guest of honor at a gala in DAR Constitution Hall to celebrate the Bicentennial of the Siege of Yorktown. He also accompanied DAR President General Patricia Walton Shelby aboard the De Grasse to meet with French President François Mitterrand and Danielle Mitterrand.

A law graduate and a graduate of Sciences Po, attracted by diplomacy, he was first at the Red Cross' disposal, where he was Deputy Director General. He later became one of the main collaborators of the haut-commissaire de France à Beyrouth.

After a period in Berlin and at the Quai d'Orsay in the sub-directorate of the Levant, he was appointed Embassy Counsellor in Ottawa and then in Washington in 1954.

Upon his return to France, he was in charge of missions at the General Directorate of the Compagnie française des pétroles and then at the Political Affairs Directorate at the ministère des Affaires étrangères.

First Embassy Counsellor in Moscow from 1962 to 1965, he became Ambassador to Brazil (1968 to 1972) and Japan (1973 to 1975).

From 1977 to 1981 he was appointed Ambassador to Washington, where he succeeded Jacques Kosciusko-Morizet, and was elevated to the rank of French Ambassador on 27 September 1978.

He was the Mayor of Saint-Saens for 36 years until 1992, where he owned the Quesnay masnor, passed-down by his maternal grand-father, the general Hely d’Oissel. A street in the city of Saint-Saëns, Seine-Maritime where he died at age 79 bears his name.

== Distinctions ==
- Commandeur of the Legion of Honour
- Commandeur of the Ordre national du Mérite
- Order of the Rising Sun (1st class)
- Grand Cross of the Order of the Southern Cross
- Associated member of the Académie des sciences, belles-lettres et arts de Rouen
