= André Lefebvre de La Boulaye =

French ambassador (1876–1966)

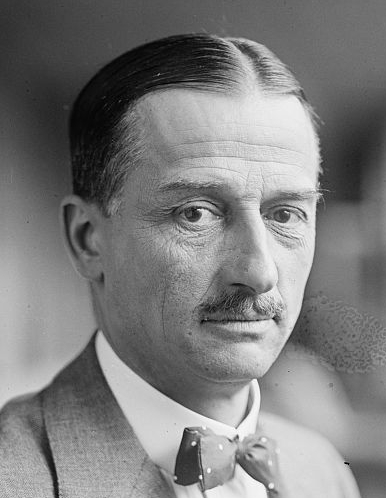
- Born: 22 January 1876; Paris, France
- Died: 17 August 1966 (aged 90); Paris
- Occupation: Diplomat
- Children: François Lefebvre de Laboulaye

André Lefebvre de La Boulaye (January 22, 1876 – August 17, 1966) was the French Ambassador to the United States from 1933 to 1937.

== Career ==
La Boulaye was born in Paris the son of a Parisian lawyer, and the grandson of the jurist, poet, author and anti-slavery activist Édouard René de Laboulaye. The La Boulaye family has included many French diplomats. He was French Ambassador to the United States from 1933 to 1937.

His son, François Lefebvre de Laboulaye, was the French Ambassador to Brazil (1968–72), Japan (1972-75), and to the United States (1977-1981). His grandson, Stanislas Lefebvre de Laboulaye, is the French Ambassador to the Holy See, and was formerly the French Ambassador to both the United States and Russia.
