= Château de Montréal =

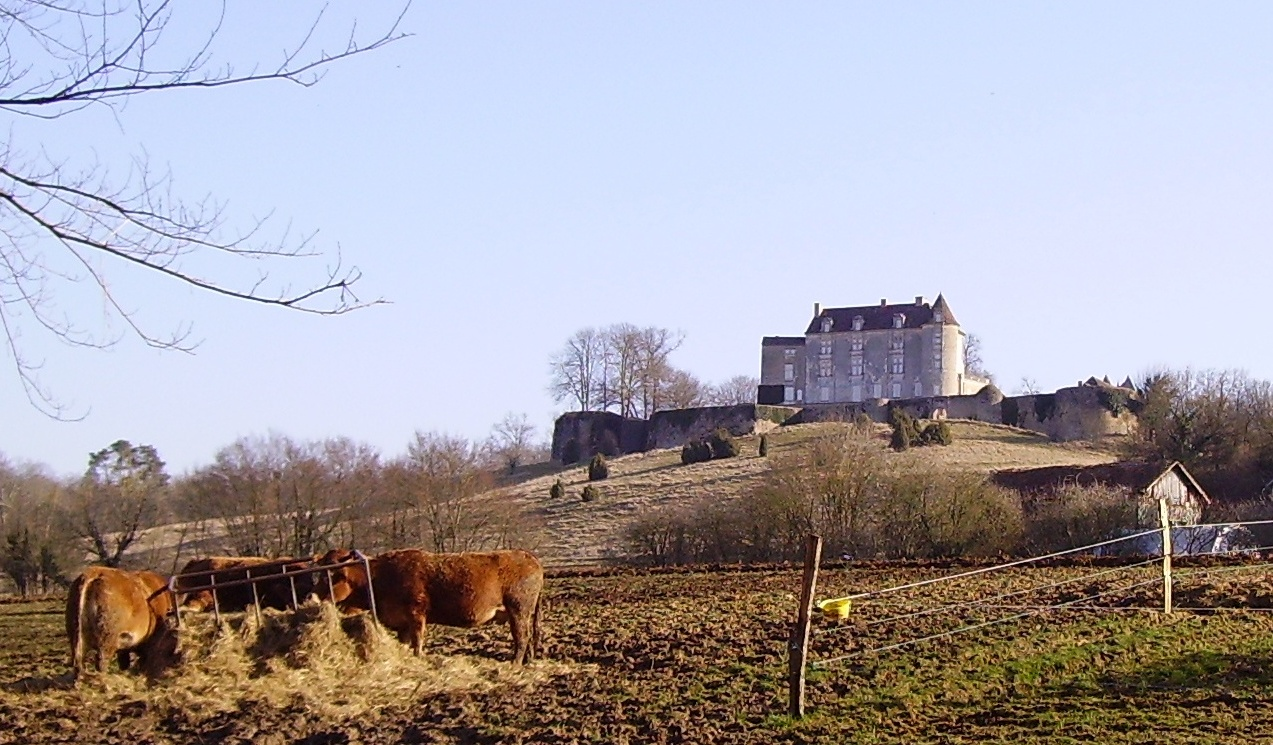
- View of the chateau from the north
- Interactive map of Château de Montréal
- 45°0′42″N 0°25′51″E
- Type: Château
- Location: Issac, Dordogne, Dordogne, Nouvelle-Aquitaine, France

History
- Built: 12th century (original)
- Rebuilt: 16th century

The Château de Montréal is a château in the Dordogne department located near the commune of Issac, in southwestern France. It overlooks the valley of the Crempse River.

It was built as a castle in the 12th century and rebuilt in the 16th century. It has been classified as a monument historique by the French Ministry of Culture since 1948. It is now a private residence.

== History ==
Claude de Pontbriand, the Seigneur de Montréal, accompanied the French explorer Jacques Cartier on his expedition up the Saint Lawrence River, and was with him on October 3, 1535, when he reached a village of the unknown nation called Saint Lawrence Iroquoians, called Hochelaga, on the site of the present day city of Montreal.

The Pontbriand family built the château in its current form. They also built the chapel Sainte-Épine. They modernized the double walls of the ramparts, which are very well preserved, and added the Renaissance-style façade of the residence.

In summertime, the house is open for visits of the salons, which have a collection of portraits, and the circular library in the tower.

== Gardens ==
The gardens were built upon the ramparts of the fortress at the beginning of the 20th century by Achille Duchêne. The lower garden is in the Italian style, and features hibiscus and yew trees, and walls covered with white roses and white clematis. The upper garden is a Garden à la française, with ornamental flower beds and a topiary garden. The garden was badly damaged by a storm in 1999, and has been replanted. The gardens are classified by the Committee of Parks and Gardens of the Ministry of Culture as one of the Notable Gardens of France.

== See also ==
- List of castles in France
- Name of Montreal
