= Christian Masset =

French diplomat (born 1957)

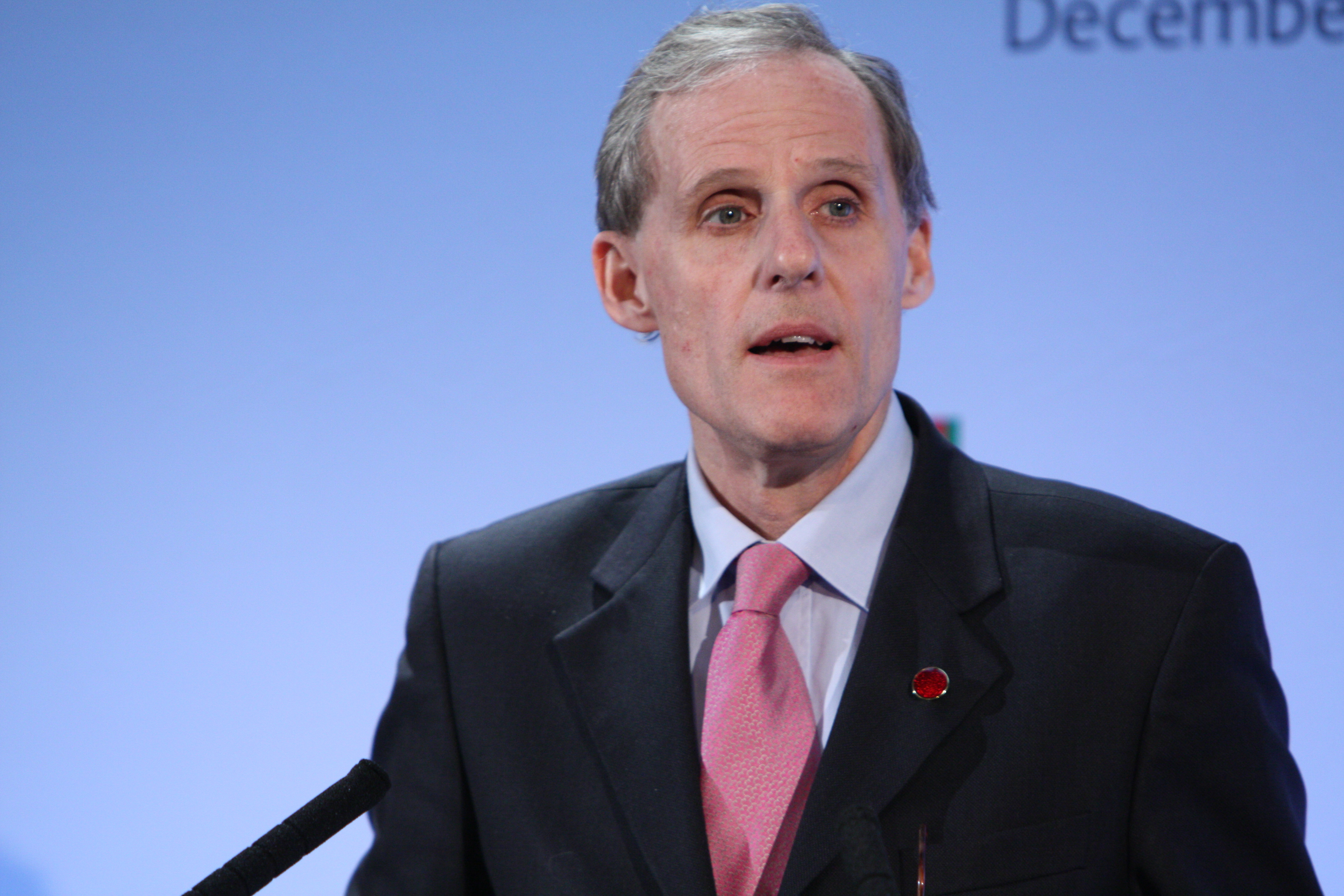
- Masset as Secretary General of the Ministry for Foreign Affairs at the conference on Afghanistan in London, 2014

Ambassador of France to Italy
- In office 21 September 2017 – 16 July 2023
- Preceded by: Catherine Colonna
- Succeeded by: Martin Briens

Secretary General of the Ministry for Europe and Foreign Affairs
- In office 17 July 2014 – 22 June 2017
- Preceded by: Pierre Sellal
- Succeeded by: Maurice Gourdault-Montagne

Ambassador of France to Japan
- In office 2011–2014
- Preceded by: Philippe Faure
- Succeeded by: Thierry Dana

Personal details
- Born: 23 January 1957 (age 69) Sète, France
- Education: Degree in political and administrative sciences
- Alma mater: Sciences Po; ESSEC Business School; École nationale d'administration
- Occupation: Civil servant, diplomat

Christian Masset (French pronunciation: [kʁistjɑ̃ masɛ]; born 23 January 1957) is a French senior civil servant and diplomat who served as ambassador of France to Japan (2011–2014) and Italy (2017–2023).

== Biography ==
Christian Masset studied at the Sciences Po (Paris Institute of Political Studies) and at the École supérieure des sciences économiques et commerciales (ESSEC). He graduated among the top of his class at the École nationale d'administration (ENA), and opted for the Ministry of Foreign Affairs.

=== Career ===
He has held various positions in the Central Administration (including the Directorate of Economic Affairs) and in the Diplomatic Network of London (1987–1989), Pretoria (1991–1994), Brussels (Permanent Representation of France to the European Union) (1994–1997, then 2002–2007 with Pierre Sellal), and Rome (1999–2002).

From 1997 to 1999, he was a member of the government cabinet of Hubert Védrine, then Minister for Foreign Affairs, alongside Pierre Sellal, head of the cabinet.

In 2009, he was responsible for creating the Directorate General for Globalization, Development, and Partnerships (DGM), resulting from the consolidation of the Directorate of Economic and Financial Affairs (DAEF), which he had led since 2007, and the Directorate General for International Cooperation and Development, born from the 1999 merger of the Directorate General of Cultural, Scientific, and Technical Relations (DGRCST) and the Ministry of Cooperation. As DGM, he chaired the board of directors of the French Agency for Education Abroad (AEFE) and that of the public interest group France Coopération Internationale. He is also part of the strategic advisory board of the French Institute.

In December 2011, he was appointed Ambassador of France to Japan, then in 2014, Secretary General of the Ministry.

In September 2017, Christian Masset was appointed Ambassador of France to Italy, succeeding Catherine Colonna.

Since 2016, he has held the lifetime dignity of Ambassador of France, and since 12 July 2023, he has been a counselor at the Court of Auditors.

=== Personal life ===
Christian Masset is married and has three children. He speaks: French, Italian, English, Spanish, and German.

== Publications ==
- Christian Masset. "L'énergie nucléaire en Europe". Revue Générale Nucléaire (in French) (1): 179–182. 5618758323.
- Kerouedan, Dominique Marie; Gentilini, Marc; Kourilsky, Philippe; Masset, Christian, eds. (2010). Santé internationale: les enjeux de santé au Sud (in French). Paris, Sciences Po. les Presses. ISBN 9782724611724. OCLC 708393910.
- Christian Masset (2011). "G8/G20 : la France et l'enjeu africain". Géopolitique africaine (in French) (39): 39–62. OCLC 806368662.
- Christian Masset (2015). "Il est évident que le nucléaire fait partie de la solution". Revue générale nucléaire (in French) (3): 12. OCLC 5864606829.

== Honors ==
Knight Grand Cross of the Order of the Star of Italy – 2023
