= Laurent Pic =

French diplomat (born 1964)

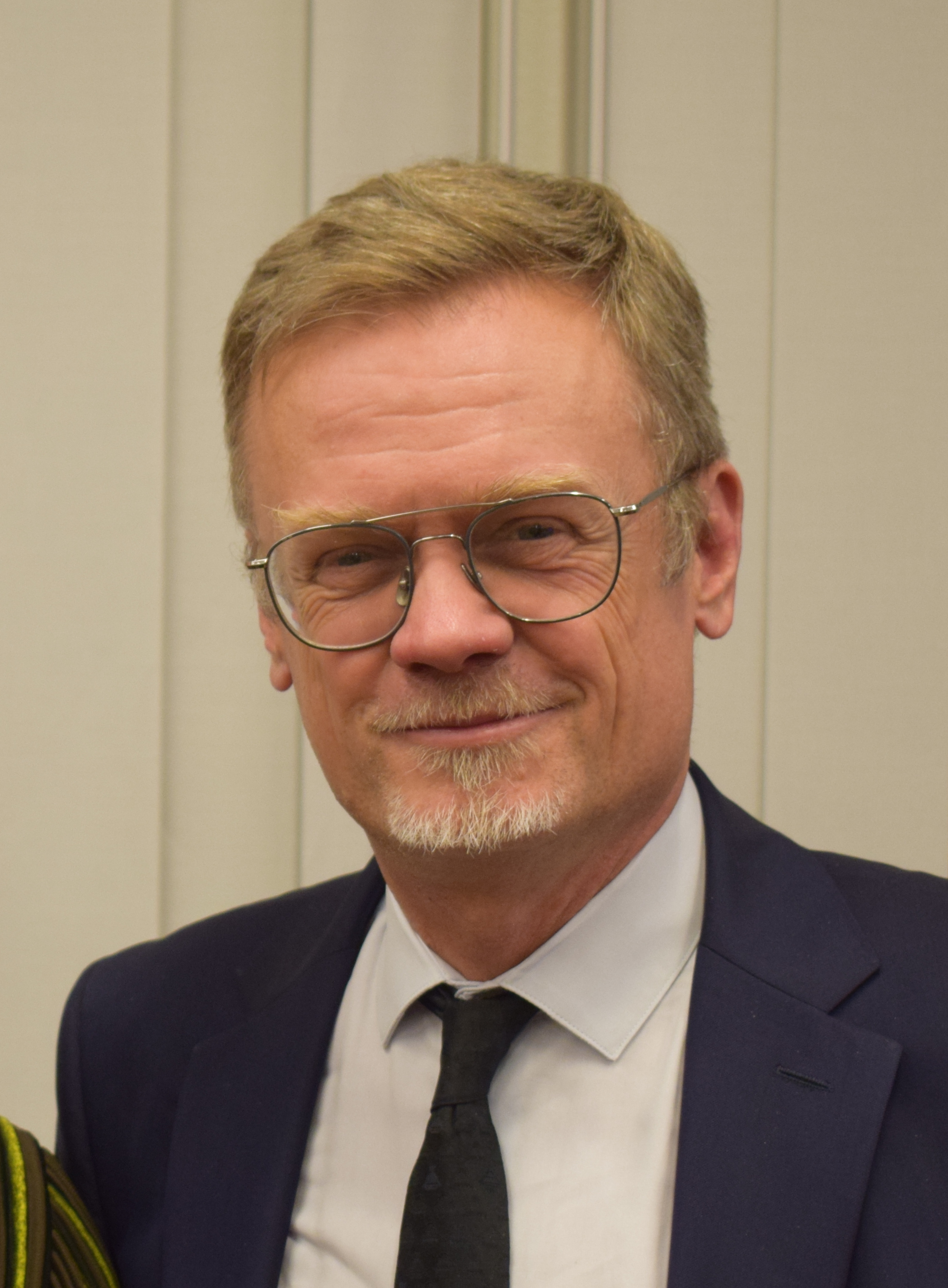
Pic in 2019

Laurent Roger Pic (French pronunciation: [lɔʁɑ̃ pik]; born 2 August 1964) is a French diplomat and senior civil servant who was appointed Inspector General of Foreign Affairs on 1 January 2025. He previously served as chief of staff to Foreign Minister Jean-Marc Ayrault (2016–2017) and as ambassador of France to the Netherlands (2014–2016) and Japan (2017–2020).

== Career ==
Pic was born in Paris. He graduated from Sciences Po and the Institut national des langues et civilisations orientales. As a diplomat, he held postings at the permanent missions of France to the United Nations and the European Union, and served as an adviser to Pierre Moscovici and Jean-Marc Ayrault. He served as Ayrault's chief of staff (directeur de cabinet) in 2016–2017.

He was ambassador to the Netherlands from 2014 to 2016, ambassador to Japan from 2017 to 2020, as well as permanent representative to the International Civil Aviation Organization from 2020 to 2024. Pic was appointed Inspector General of Foreign Affairs on 1 January 2025.

== Honours ==
Pic is a knight of the Legion of Honour (2019) and an officer of the National Order of Merit (2025).

He was made an officer of the Order of Merit of the Italian Republic by Prime Minister Mario Monti on 19 November 2012 and granted the Order of the Rising Sun by Japanese Foreign Minister Toshimitsu Motegi on 15 September 2020.
