= Étienne Dennery =

French academic, public servant and diplomat

- Born: 20 March 1903; Paris, France
- Died: 29 December 1979 (aged 76); Paris, France
- Education: École Normale Supérieure
- Occupation: Diplomat

Étienne Dennery (20 March 1903; Paris – 29 December 1979; Paris) was a French academic, public servant and diplomat. Dennery studied at the École normale supérieure from 1923 to 1926 and became agrégé in history and geography. He received an Albert Kahn grant to travel abroad and spent time in China, India and Japan studying demographics and gathering material for a book published in French in 1930 and translated into English in 1931 under the title Asia's Teeming Millions: and its problems for the West. He later worked as an economic expert for the Lytton Commission on Manchuria. He then taught at the École Libre des Sciences Politiques, the Institute of Higher International Studies (Panthéon-Assas University), and at HEC Paris as well as giving invited lectures throughout the Northwestern United States. In 1935, Dennery and Louis Joxe co-founded the Centre d'études de politique étrangère (center for foreign policy) which Joxe described as inspired by the British Royal Institute of International Affairs.

When Germany invaded France in 1940, Dennery joined Charles de Gaulle's Free French Forces and worked for the information services. After the end of the war in 1945, Dennery joined the Ministry of Foreign Affairs as the director for Americas affairs. He was then successively named Ambassador to Poland (1950–54), Switzerland (1954–61) and Japan (1961–64).

Returning to France, Dennery was named on 16 September 1964 Directeur des bibliothèques et de la lecture publique, administrateur général de la Bibliothèque nationale (director of libraries and public reading, administrator general of the National Library), a job he held until his retirement in 1975.

== Bibliography ==
- Foules d'Asie. 1930.
- Asia's teeming millions: and its problems for the West, 1931 (1930 for the French edition) ISBN 9780804610940
- A French economist's visit to western colleges, 1936 OCLC 249775079
