= List of ambassadors of France to Poland =

The following is a list of ambassadors and other highest-ranking representatives of France to Poland. The exchange of diplomatic representatives and envoys between France and Poland date back to the 16th century when Henry III of France briefly held the title of King of Poland. Sources often disagree on the exact title given to the various diplomats of the 16th, 17th and 18th centuries and some envoys with lesser responsibilities have been left out of the list but can be found in the two main sources for that period.

== 16th century ==
Main sources for this section:

- 1573 Gilles de Noailles, bishop of Dax and Jean de Monluc, Bishop of Valence (ambassadora)
- 1574 Jean Choisnin
- 1575 Jacques de Faye, seigneur d'Espeisses (envoy)

== 17th century ==
Main sources:

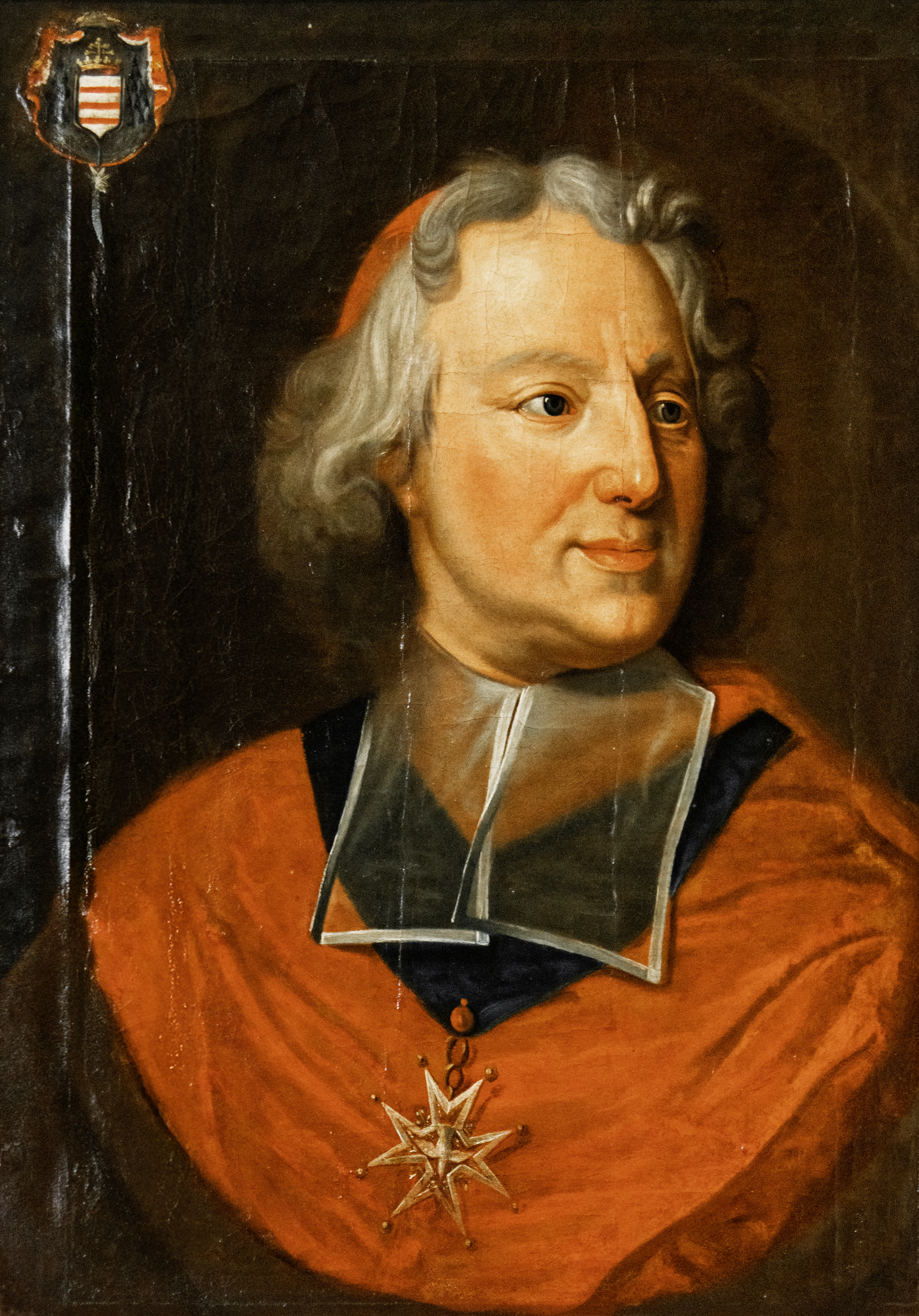
Melchior de Polignac

- 1629 Baron Hercule de Charnacé (ambassador)
- 1633 Claude de Mesmes, comte d'Avaux (ambassador extr.)
- 1636 Baron Claude de Rorté, (in some sources Claude de Salles, Baron de Rorté)
- 1640 Charles de Bretagne comte d’Avaugour (or simply Charles d’Avaugour)
- 1644 Renée Crespin du Bec (ambassador extr.), first female ambassador in French history
- 1648 Louis d'Arpajon (ambassador extr.)
- 1655-1665 Antoine de Lumbres (or Antoine de Lombres) (ambassador plen.)
- 1656, 1677 Roger Akakia
- 1663 Pierre Caillet
- 1664 Guillaume Millet
- 1664-1666, 1668 Pierre de Bonzi, Bishop of Béziers (ambassador extr.)
- 1669 Jean de la Haye de Vantelet
- 1669 Hugues de Lionne
- 1674 Toussaint de Forbin-Janson, Bishop of Marseille (ambassador)
- 1676-1680 marquis François-Gaston de Béthune-Sully (1638–1692) (ambassador extr.)
- 1680-1683 Nicolas-Louis de l'Hospital, Bishop of Beauvais and Marquis of Vitry
- 1684-1692 marquis François-Gaston de Béthune-Sully (1638–1692) (ambassador extr.)
- 1689 Mr. Duteil (also spelled Du Teil, Du Theil or Dutheil)
- 1692 Jean-Casimir Baluze (secretary, acted as interim representative)
- 1692 Robert le Rroux d'Esneval (ambassador)
- 1693-1696 Melchior de Polignac
- 1697 Mr. de Forval initially designated as envoy fell ill and was replaced by François de Châteauneuf (or François de Castagnères), Abbot of Châteauneuf
- 1700-1702 Charles de Caradas, marquis du Héron

== 18th century ==
Main sources:

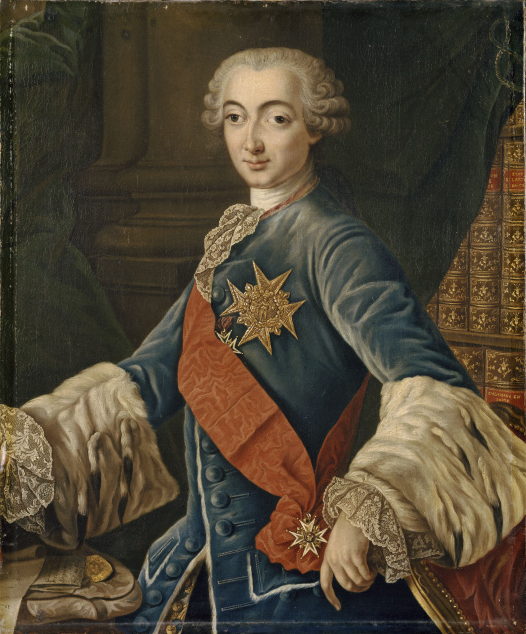
Antoine-René de Voyer de Paulmy d'Argenson

- 1700-1702 Charles de Caradas, marquis du Héron
- 1702-1703 Jean Casimir Baluze
- 1707-1710 Jean Louis d'Usson de Bonnac ambassador to Stanislas Leszczyński.
- 1711 Baron Nathaniel Hooke (also spelled Hoock and Hooek)
- 1713-1721 Jean Victor de Besenval de Brünstatt, (father of Pierre Victor de Besenval de Brünstatt)
- 1714 Mr. de Montargon
- 1726-1728 François Sanguin de Livry
- 1728 Michel de Villebois (under the pseudonym Mr. de Laube) (agent)
- 1729-1736 marquis Antoine-Félix de Monti
- 1744-1745 Alphonse Marie Louis de Saint-Séverin (ambassador extr.)
- 1746-1752 Charles-Hyacinthe de Gallean, marquis des Issarts (1716-54) (env. extr.)
- 1752-1756 Charles François de Broglie
- Seven Years' War (1756-1763)
- 1762-1764 Antoine-René de Voyer de Paulmy d'Argenson (ambassador)
- 1764 Jean Antoine Monnet (consul general)
- 1766 Louis Gabriel Conflans (to congratulate Stanislas Leszczyński)
- 1770-1787 Bonneau (correspondent)
- 1791-1792 Marie Louis Descorches (Minister Plenipotentiary)
- 1794 Bonneau (chargé d'affaires)

== 19th century: Duchy of Warsaw ==
Main source:

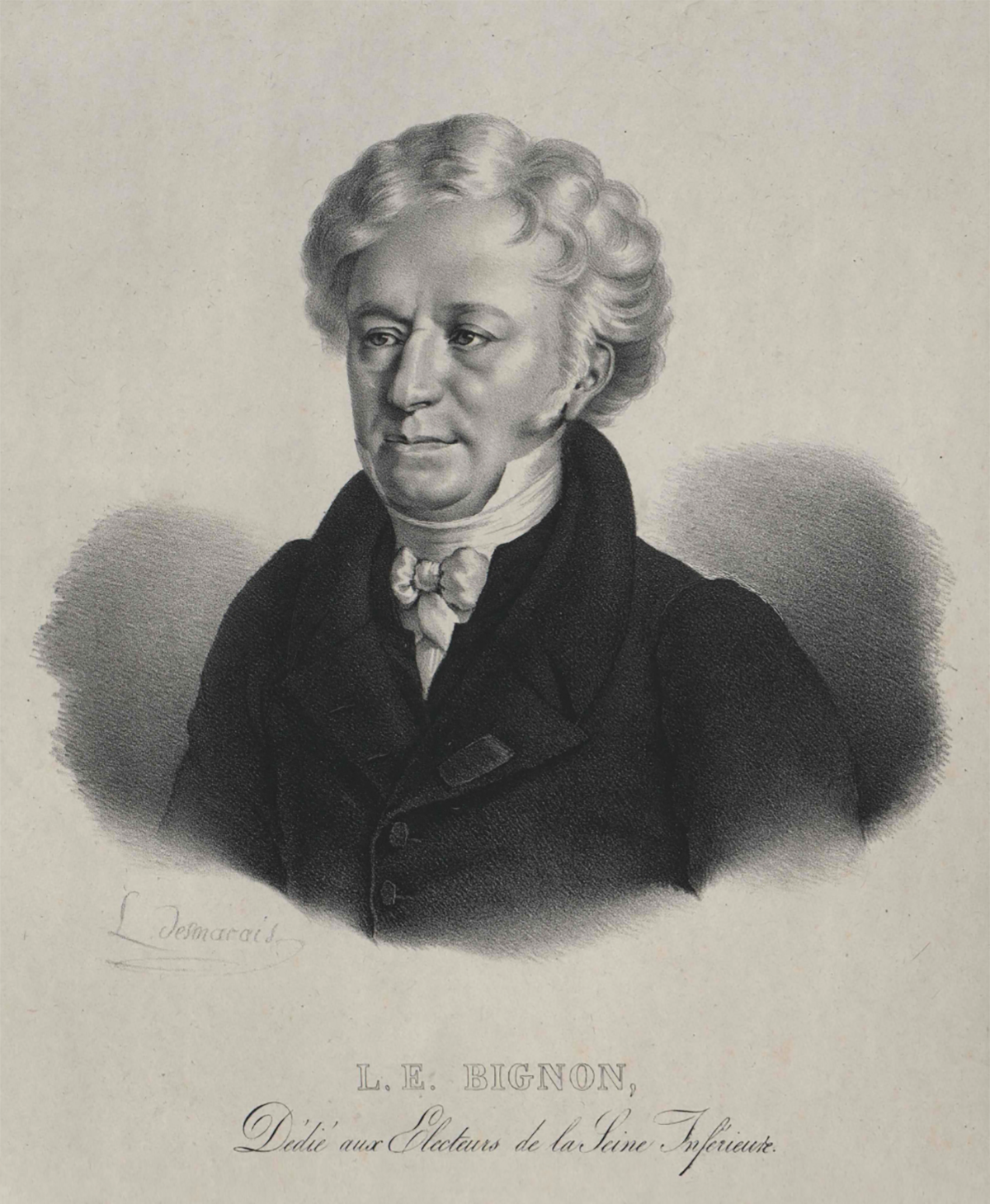
Louis Pierre Édouard Bignon

- 1807-1809 Étienne Vincent
- 1809-1811 Jean-Charles Serra
- 1810-1812 Louis Pierre Édouard Bignon
- 1812 Dominique Dufour de Pradt
- 1826-1837 Louis Marie Raymond Durand (consul)

== Second Polish Republic (1918-1944) ==
Main source:

- 1919 Eugène Pralon (Envoy Extraordinary and Minister Plenipotentiary)
- 1920 Charles de Saint-Aulaire
- 1920 - 1925 André de Panafieu (Envoy Extraordinary and Minister Plenipotentiary (1920-1924) and Ambassador)
- 1925 - 1935 Jules Laroche (Ambassador)
- 1935 - 1939 Léon Noël Ambassador in Warsaw until September 1939 and then representative to the Polish government-in-exile until June 1940
  - 1942 - Emmanuel Lancial, representative of the Comité national français to the Polish government-in-exile

== People's Republic of Poland (1944-1989) ==
Main sources: All but Fouchet had the rank of ambassador.

- 1944 - Christian Fouchet (representative of the Provisional Government of the French Republic)
- 1945 - Roger Garreau
- 1947 - Jean Baelen
- 1950 - Étienne Dennery
- 1954 - Pierre de Leusse
- 1956 - Éric de Carbonnel
- 1958 - Étienne Burin des Roziers
- 1962 - Pierre Charpentier
- 1966 - Arnauld Wapler
- 1970 - Augustin Jordan, Compagnon de la Libération
- 1973 - Louis Dauge
- 1977 - Serge Boidevaix
- 1980 - Jacques Dupuy
- 1982 - Jean-Bernard Raimond
- 1985 - Jean-François Noiville
- 1986 - Claude Harel

== Republic of Poland (1989–present) ==
Main sources: All diplomats below were ambassadors.

- 1986 - Claude Harel
- 1990 - Alain Bry
- 1994 - Daniel Contenay
- 1997 - Benoît d’Aboville
- 2002 - Patrick Gautrat
- 2004 - Pierre Ménat
- 2007 - François Barry Delongchamps
- 2012 - Pierre Buhler
- 2016 - Pierre Lévy
- 2019 - Frédéric Billet
- 2023 - Étienne de Poncins

== See also ==
- France–Poland relations
