= Raymond Brugère =

French diplomat (1885–1966)

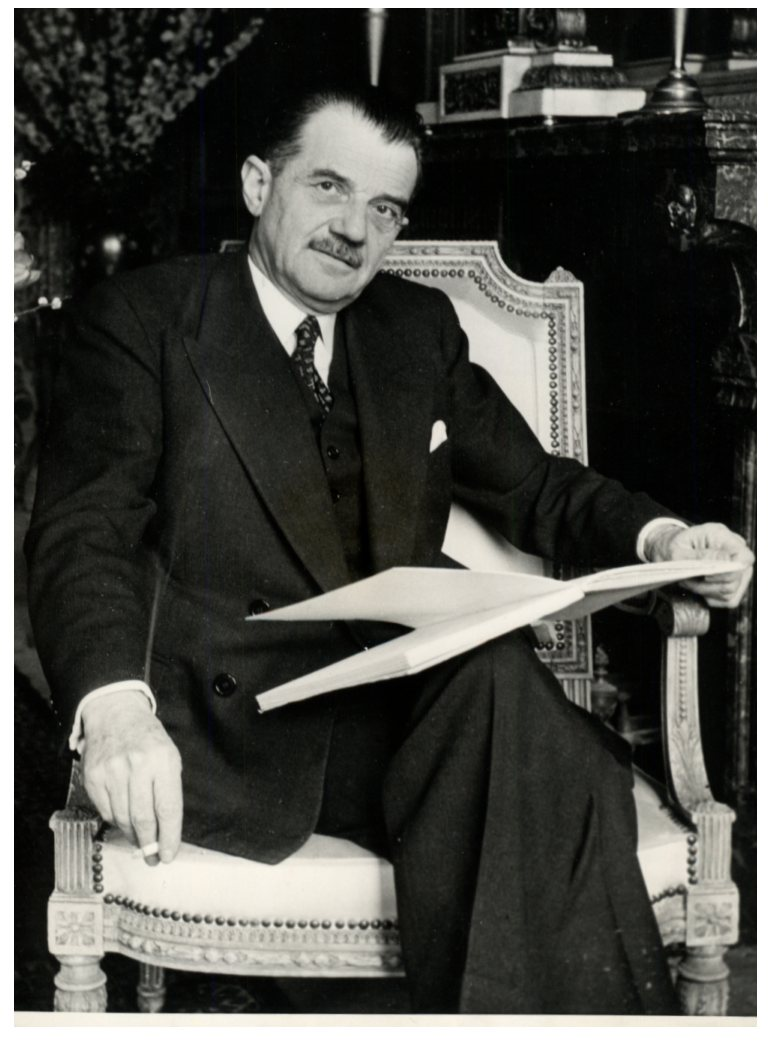
- Born: Charles Henri Raymond Brugère; 25 January 1885; Orléans, France
- Died: 30 August 1966 (aged 81); Châtenoy, France
- Occupation: Diplomat
- Years active: 1911–1948
- Known for: Ambassador to Canada (1934–1937), Yugoslavia (1937–1940), Belgium (1944–1947)
- Spouse: Denise Témoin
- Children: Nicole Brugère

Charles Henri Raymond Brugère (French pronunciation: [ʁɛmɔ̃ bʁyʒɛʁ]; 25 January 1885 – 30 August 1966) was a French diplomat.

== Diplomat ==
Brugère was born in Orléans, the son of General Joseph Brugère and Louise Thieclin. He graduated with a degree in the law. Brugère joined the Quai d'Orsay on 17 May 1911, and first went overseas to start serving as the third secretary at the French legation in Beijing on 1 August 1912. On 5 June 1912, Brugère married Denise Témoin, the daughter of a famous doctor, Daniel Témoin. By his wife, he had one child, a daughter named Nicole. As a reservist lieutenant in the chasseurs à cheval, Brugère was called up to duty in August 1914 to resist the German invasion of France at the beginning of World War I. He was mentioned in a report for bravery under fire on 23 September 1914. Subsequently, he transferred over to the Chasseurs d'Afrique, and took part in the Dardanelles campaign of 1915. Later in 1915, Brugère went to Serbia, where he was wounded in action.

Owing to his wounds, he returned to the service of the Quai d'Orsay, and was posted as the third secretary at the French embassy in Madrid on 11 March 1916. On 22 February 1918, he was posted as the third secretary at the French embassy in Copenhagen. In May 1919, he returned to France to serve in Department of Commercial Relations at the Quai d'Orsay's main office in Paris. In Paris, Brugère was known as a close associate of Raymond Poincaré, a conservative leader known as one of the "tough guys" of French politics. Brugère supported Poincaré's policy of "firmness" in upholding the Treaty of Versailles, arguing to revise the Versailles in favor of Germany that would be the end of France as a great power. Brugère supported the policy of encouraging separatism in the Allied–occupied Rhineland, arguing that if the Rhineland could be served from Germany, the new Rhinish state would be a French client state that would allow the French to occupy the Rhineland permanently.

On 21 November 1924, he was posted as first secretary at the French embassy in Ankara. On 16 December 1929, he arrived in Brussels as the embassy counselor at the French embassy. Belgium had signed a military alliance with France in 1920, which lasted until 1936, when Belgium renounced the alliance and declared itself neutral. The main concern in Franco-Belgian relations was the World Disarmament Conference that started in Geneva in February 1932, when the German government demanded gleichberechtigung ("equality of status"), using a conference that was supposed to be about disarmament as a forum to demand rearmament, claiming that it was morally right that the military restrictions imposed by the Treaty of Versailles be ended at once. On 8 September 1932, Brugère reported to Paris that he talked with the Belgian Prime Minister Paul Hymans who told him that France must oppose gleichberechtigung, saying to allow Germany to rearm would be the end of the Versailles system. In December 1932, under heavy Anglo-American pressure, France agreed to accept "in principle" gleichberechtigung at the World Disarmament Conference with the only issue being not whatever Germany was going to rearm or not, but rather the extent of German rearmament. During his time in Brussels, he became a friend of the poet Paul Claudel who was serving as the French ambassador.

The Belgian historian Catherine Lanneau described Brugère as a man of contradictions, an irascible man who erupted in most undiplomatic outbursts of rage while also being a most compassionate man full of sympathy for others; a man some found very clumsy and awkward while others praised him for his courage and idealism; a self-proclaimed "tough guy" who favored a "hard" style of power politics while also being an "idealist" and a lover of the arts and poetry. Brugère was a man who believed deeply in the greatness of France which he linked with his desire for the betterment of all humanity, believing that French culture was a "civilizing" force, and that the greater of the power of France the better the future of humanity. In this way, Brugère was able to balance the "hard" and "soft" sides of his personality. Brugère was strongly influenced by the style of diplomacy practiced by the comte de Saint-Aulaire and Claudel. In 1932, Brugère together with Maurice Paléologue, the last French ambassador to Imperial Russia, published an "Le Plan Schlieffen et le "Vengeur": Deux Lettres" (The Schlieffen Plan and the "Avenger": Two Letters") that defended the actions of France during the July crisis of 1914 against the thesis promoted by Germany of the Reich as the victim of Franco-Russian aggression.

== Minister in Ottawa ==
From August 3, 1934, to August 26, 1937, he served as the French ministre plénipotentiaire (minister plenipotentiary) in Ottawa. On 16 October 1934, Brugère arrived at Rideau Hall to present his credentials to the Governor-General Lord Bessborough. Brugère was the driving force behind building a new French legation (now the French embassy) in Ottawa, designed in a modernist Art Deco style intended as a showcase for the greatness of France. Brugère stated in a 1935 speech: “Since my arrival here, I have noticed the high level of moral importance that this project presents. Maybe more than anywhere else, it is important to Canada that France settled here, and in a building that bestows such honour upon us, while flattering the Canadians’ pride, who have conserved, so alive in them, the memory, and the taste of home." The legation was designed in a lavish, sumptuous style designed to impress while being filled with imagery and symbolism that evokes New France. The message of the art deco style for the legation was that France was a nation at the forefront of modernity, a country that leading the world in culture, art, science and technology. The legation also featured symbolism and iconography meant to evoke Franco-Canadian friendship such as the Vimy Memorial located within the legation that honored all the Canadians killed or wounded while taking Vimy Ridge in 1917. Brugère was concerned by the new Nazi government in Germany, and having the legation feature iconography evoking the Great War was intended to quite consciously convey the message to any visitors that France and Canada had once been allies against Germany once, and should be allies again.

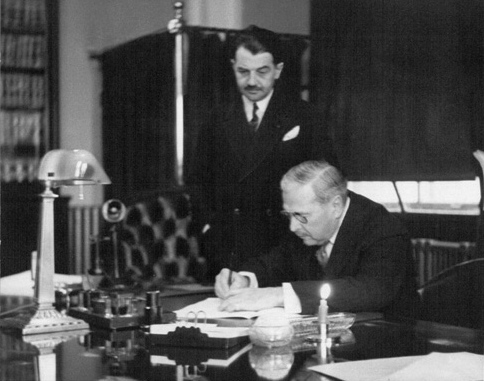
Raymond Brugère watches as the Postmaster of Canada, Arthur Sauvé, signs an agreement, Ottawa 1935.

During his time in Canada, Brugère was infuriated by the semi-isolationist foreign policy of Prime Minister William Lyon Mackenzie King, who made it clear to Brugèret that the affairs of Europe were of no interest to him. Brugère reported to Paris that Mackenzie King was a supporter of appeasement who felt that Adolf Hitler was morally in the right in challenging the international order created by the Treaty of Versailles and that Canada was not willing to do anything to assist France with upholding that order. Brugère noted that Mackenzie King was a protégé of Sir Wilfrid Laurier, and drew unfavorable comparisons with Laurier who supported Canada's involvement in the Great War with Mackenzie King, who had no intention of fighting in another world war.

In February 1936, at a party in Ottawa, Brugère pressed Mackenzie King and his Quebec lieutenant Ernest Lapointe, about Canada taking part in the Exposition Internationale des Arts et Techniques dans la Vie Moderne, which was scheduled for 1937. Mackenzie King was uncertain and hesitant as he usually was when faced with a decision, saying he did not know if Canada could afford the costs of opening a pavilion at the exposition. Brugère trapped Mackenzie King to sending out a cable to Paris, saying that Mackenzie King had accepted his offer, leading to the Quai d'Orsay to issue a public letter of thanks and that France would welcome Canada taking part in the exposition. After the announcement, Mackenzie King had no choice but have Canada take part in the exposition.

On 29 February 1936, Brugère reported to Paris with worry about the strong "reaction" against the League of Nations amongst French-Canadians, stating it widely accepted in Quebec that the League was an "instrument" of British foreign policy that sought to "unjustly" punish Italy by imposing sanctions for invading Ethiopia. The ultra-conservative Catholic intelligentsia of Quebec-whose informal leader was a nationalist Catholic priest, the Abbe Lionel Groulx-idolized Benito Mussolini, and the decision to have Canada join with the League of Nations sanctions on Italy was deeply unpopular in Quebec. Noting that Mackenzie King was a "weathervane" politician who always followed public opinion rather than seeking to lead it, Brugère reported the prime minister was now very much against the League and its principles of collective security.

On 7 March 1936, Germany remilitarized the Rhineland, which was a violation of both the Treaty of Versailles and the Treaty of Locarno. Mackenzie King stated that if Britain went to war to uphold the demilitarised status of the Rhineland, there was no possibility of Canada joining in. The American historian Gerhard Weinberg wrote that it was clear "...by 13 March that the British Dominions, especially the Union of South Africa and Canada, would not stand with England if war came. The South African government in particular was busy backing the German position in London and with the other Dominion governments". Brugère pressed Mackenzie King to have Canada at least make support make a statement of support for France, which he refused to do, claiming that Canada had not signed the Treaty of Locarno, leading Brugère to reply that Canada had signed the Treaty of Versailles and should be doing more to uphold it.

== Minister in Belgrade ==
From 26 August 1937 to 17 June 1940, he served as the French minister-plenipotentiary in Belgrade. Brugère was close to Prince Paul, the Regent for the boy king Petar II. In a dispatch to Paris, Brugère described the Prince-Regent as a man whose "incontestable qualities of character, balance, and taste...Oxonian dilettantism and charm which he exercised on his visitors were useless in the present circumstances and in a country where arguments of might are the only ones which count".

Yugoslavia had allied to France in 1927, but in the 1930s, the Franco-Yugoslav alliance began to fry. At the time the alliance was signed in 1927, the Rhineland was still demilitarized. Weinberg called the demilitarized status of the Rhineland the "single most important guarantee of peace in Europe" as it exposed western Germany, especially the Ruhr, to the possibility of being seized by the French, who were widely expected to launch an offensive into western Germany if any of France's allies in Eastern Europe were attacked. The wide Rhine river together with the hilly countryside of the Rhineland made it into a natural defensive barrier; by contrast, the open North German Plain in which lay behind the Rhineland favored the offensive. As long as the Rhineland was demilitarized, Germany had no means of stopping the French from seizing much of western Germany. On 7 March 1936, Germany remilitarized the Rhineland, which completely upset the calculations behind Yugoslav grand strategy. The Germans immediately began building the Siegfried Line along their western border with France to block a French offensive into western Germany. The implications of the Siegfried Line were that Germany could now attack at any will any of France's allies in Eastern Europe with no fear of a French offensive was greatly alarming to France's East European allies. At Bucharest between 15 and 20 June 1936, the chiefs of staff of the Little Entente nations of Czechoslovakia, Romania and Yugoslavia met to discuss the changed situation with the conclusion being that there now only two great powers in Eastern Europe, namely the Soviet Union and Germany as France was no longer a factor.

Brugère's primary duty in Belgrade to maintain the Franco-Yugoslav alliance. In his dispatches to Paris, he complained about the myopic and self-defeating nature of French protectionism, which had ensured that France was only a small market for Yugoslav exports. Through Yugoslavia was a significant market for French exports, especially automobiles, the lack of Yugoslav exports to France had proved to be a major weakness in the Franco-Yugoslav alliance that Germany was quick to take advantage of. Yugoslavia was a predominantly rural country in the 1930s, and the inability of Yugoslavia to export food to France owing to high French tariffs had allowed Germany to take the lion's share of Yugoslav imports. The Reich had a greater population than what German agriculture was capable of feeding, thus requiring Germany to import food to feed its people. In 1936, Hjalmar Schacht, the German economic minister and the president of the Reichsbank, had visited Belgrade where he made an offer to Milan Stojadinović, the Yugoslav prime minister, under which Germany would buy the entire Yugoslav harvest in exchange for which Germany would sell Yugoslavia machine tools and other industrial equipment to assist Stojadinović's plans for the industrialisation of Yugoslavia. Stojadinović accepted Schacht's offer, and as a result, by the time that Brugère arrived in Belgrade, Yugoslavia was very much in the German economic sphere of influence at least at least as far as trade was concerned. The French remained the number one foreign investors in Yugoslavia together with Poland; the number two foreign investors in Czechoslovakia with French investment being exceeded only by British investment; and the number third foreign investors in Romania being exceeded by British and American investment. Brugère's duty was to reverse these tends and pull Yugoslavia back into the French sphere of influence.

Under Stojadinović, Yugoslavia started to move closer to the Axis states of Italy and Germany and away from France. In January 1938, Stojadinović visited Berlin, where he was received as the guest of honor by Adolf Hitler. Stojadinović stated in a speech during his visit to Berlin that the problems in German-Yugoslav relations had been caused by past Yugoslav leaders viewing the problems of Europe "through French spectacles", a handicap that Stojadinović assured his hosts that he did not suffer from. Stojadinović's speech caused a sharp reaction in Paris, and Brugère was ordered to confront Stojadinović upon his return to Belgrade about his statements praising Nazi Germany. In February 1938, Brugère had an extremely unfriendly meeting with Stojadinović, where he expressed his "astonishment" about his statements in Berlin. In response, Stojadinović stated maintaining the alliance with France remained a "fundamental" element of his foreign policy, leading Brugère to demand proof of such intentions. Brugère demanded that Yugoslav Army officers start hold staff talks with French Army officers again, and have Yugoslavia to start buying French arms again, saying that as far as he concerned that Yugoslavia was a French ally in word, not deed.

Prince Paul, and to lesser extent Stojadinović did not want a complete rupture with France, and the "toughness" of Brugère's remarks greatly alarmed both men. Both Paul and Stojadinović sought to assure Brugère that the Franco-Yugoslav alliance was still an "alliance". The Prince-Regent ordered the Yugoslav military to resume ties with the French military. The Yugoslav War Minister, General Ljubomir Marić, gave assurances that if it came to war, Yugoslavia and France "undoubtedly would be on the same side of the barricade". Marić stated that Yugoslavia had to be friendly with the Axis for the moment because of its military and industrial backwardness, but once there issues were addressed, it would resume its traditional alliance with France. Most importantly, it was agreed that Yugoslavia and France would work together in gathering and sharing of intelligence about Germany and Italy. Brugère reported to Paris that despite the pro-Axis inclinations of Stojadinović that France was popular in Yugoslavia, quoting one Belgrade resident as saying to him: "We love France desperately, blindly, comme une femme.

On 5 April 1938, a conference was called in Paris attended by the Foreign Minister Joseph Paul-Boncour about the Sudetenland crisis in Eastern Europe. Besides for Paul-Boncour, the conference was attended by Alexis St.Léger-St.Léger, the Secretary-General of the Quai d'Orsay; Robert Coulondre, the ambassador in Moscow; Léon Noël, the ambassador in Warsaw; Victor de Lacroix, the minister-plenipotentiary in Prague; Adrien Thierry, the minister-plenipotentiary in Bucharest, and Brugère. At the conference, it was agreed that as long as France's allies in Eastern Europe continued to feud with one another, the balance in power in Eastern Europe would continue to shift in Germany's direction. Lacroix stated that President Edvard Beneš of Czechoslovakia did not want a war and was willing to negotiate about the Sudetenland, but would fight if his country were attacked by Germany. Thierry stated that there was some hope that King Carol II of Romania might grant the Red Army transit rights to allow the Soviet forces to aid Czechoslovakia in the event of war while Noël stated there was no hope of the Poles granting the Red Army transit rights at all. Coulondre stated that the best hope of deterring Germany from war was having the Red Army being granted transit rights, saying he would work to settle the long-running Bessarabia dispute between the Soviet Union and Romania, saying if the Romanians could be persuaded to grant the Red Army transit rights to aid Czechoslovakia, then Germany might be deterred. Brugère was grimly forced to report that Yugoslavia was drifting away from its alliance with France, and would probably do nothing to help Czechoslovakia. On 10 April 1938, a new government came to power in Paris with Georges Bonnet, a man hostile to the French alliance system in Eastern Europe, becoming the Foreign Minister while Édouard Daladier became the Premier.

In May 1938, Brugère reported to Georges Bonnet, the new French Foreign Minister, that the talks on intelligence co-operation were going very well, and that General Milutin Nedić, the chief of the Yugoslav general staff, wanted to work as closely as possible with the Deuxième Bureau. Colonel Maurice-Henri Gauché, the chief of the Deuxième Bureau, visited Belgrade between 3–11 May 1938, where the Yugoslavs made no effort to hide his visit and even encouraged him to wear his uniform in public, which Brugère saw as an extremely positive sign. Brugère reported to Bonnet that an intelligence link might lead to "a rekindled desire for secret collaboration on wider questions". Brugère reported that the Belgrade visit of Gauché had worked to France's "greatest imaginable benefit". During the May crisis of 1938, when President Beneš ordered a partial mobilisation of the Czechoslovak Army as he believed that his country was on the verge of a German invasion, the Franco-Yugoslav intelligence alliance did not break down as some French officials feared that it would. Brugère reported that the Yugoslavs provided good intelligence about military activities in Hungary (which was expected to join with Germany in attacking Czechoslovakia). René Massigli, the political director of the Quai d'Orsay reported to the Premier Édouard Daladier, that the intelligence links with Yugoslavia "had worked very satisfactorily" during the May crisis and that he hoped for closer ties with Yugoslavia. The British historian Martin Alexander wrote that the way that diplomats such as Brugère were achieving at least some success in holding together the French alliance system in Eastern Europe showed that even after the remilitarization of the Rhineland that all was not lost for French diplomacy in Eastern Europe, and that it was a conscious choice on the part of Bonnet to seek to end the alliance system.

Stojadinović's schemes for the industrialisation involved an intense struggle to build a weapons factory at Zenitra that came down to a showdown between the corporation of Schneider-Creusot, France's biggest weapons manufacturer, and the corporation of Krupp AG, Germany's biggest weapons manufacturer. Brugère had orders from Paris to ensure that Schneider-Creusot won the contract while his opposite number, Viktor von Heeren, the German minister-plenipotentiary in Belgrade, had orders from Berlin to ensure that Krupp won the contract. A French economic mission visited Belgrade together with Sofia and Bucharest between 15 November and 10 December 1938 to "identify the reasons for France's economic decline in several of the countries visited; to immediately reach a number of commercial agreements meant to improve a situation detrimental to our exports and to the payment of our financial obligations". The Quai d'Orsay recommended to Daladier that France accept the commission's advice to increase France's economic presence in the Balkans, which were dominated economically by Germany, but at a meeting on 30 January 1939 chaired by Daladier, the minister of agriculture, Henri Queuille, argued that accepting more food exports from the Balkans would damage French agriculture. Queuille said that French farmers voted in French elections while Yugoslav farmers did not, and this argument won the day. The unwillingness of France to lower its tariffs on Yugoslav agricultural products led Yugoslavia to remain within the German economic sphere of influence.

On 5 February 1939, Paul dismissed Stojadinović as prime minister and replaced him with Dragiša Cvetković. Brugère regarded the change as an improvement, describing Cvetković as a Francophile and stated that he was "un de nos meilleurs amis" ("one of our best friends"). During the Danzig crisis, the French planned in the event of war to revive the Salonika front strategy. The French General Staff planned to have the Armée du Levant commanded by Marshal Maxime Weygand based in the French mandates of Lebanon and Syria to sail from Beirut to land at Thessaloniki in order to march up the Balkans to link up with the Yugoslavs and the Romanians to aid the Polish Armed Forces. As such, Yugoslavia came to form a key element in French plans, and Brugère found himself holding a crucial ambassadorship. On 13 April 1939, Britain and France "guaranteed" the frontiers of Romania and Greece. Both King Carol II and the Greek prime minister Ioannis Metaxas accepted the "guarantees" of their respective nations. For Paul, the willingness of Metaxas to align Greece with Britain and France indicated that it was possible for the Allies to use Thessaloniki as a base to aid Yugoslavia. In the aftermath of the Italian conquest of Albania on Easter Sunday 1939, Greece and Yugoslavia, allied in the Balkan Pact, opened up intense staff talks on the best way to co-ordinate their defense in the event of an Italian invasion as both Paul and Metaxas expected Mussolini to attack their nations sometime in the near future. Increasing the pressure on Paul was the signing in Rome on 22 May 1939 of the Pact of Steel, an offensive and defensive alliance linking Fascist Italy and Nazi Germany. The fact that the Pact of Steel was an offensive alliance committing either power to declare war on any nation that the other power had declared war on was most unusual. For Paul, the Pact of Steel was greatly alarming as it meant if either Germany or Italy attacked Yugoslavia, the other Axis power was obliged to join in, which led Paul to turn to Brugère to seek French support for Yugoslavia.

As part of these plans to revive the Salonika front, Brugère was in close contact with Romanian diplomats. In late May 1939, Brugère reported that King Carol II was sympathetic towards France, but would not enter the war until he was certain that the Allies would win. Brugère reported that King Carol was greatly haunted by the way Romania had been devastated in World War I and would choose neutrality if the Danzig crisis came to war. In June 1939, the German offer of trade credits to Yugoslavia together with rumors of an imminent Italian invasion of Greece caused Brugère to step-up his efforts to win Yugoslavia for the "peace front". Brugère told Prince Paul that he was going to fly to Paris to personally lobby Bonnet and Daladier to have France provide Yugoslavia with modern military equipment. Brugère's lobbying for Yugoslavia was successful. On 29 June 1939, it was that announced that the Bank Seligmann of Paris was going to make a loan of 600 million francs to Yugoslavia that was to be spent on weapons for the Yugoslav military. On 14 July 1939, the Yugoslav finance minister, Vojin Đuričić, signed an agreement in Paris with Daladier for France to sell Yugoslavia anti-aircraft guns, trucks, howitzers, anti-tank guns, machine guns, tanks and tank transporters. On 19 August 1939, Brugère together with the French military attaché in Belgrade, Colonel Merson, met with General Dušan Simović, the chief of the Yugoslav general staff, to discuss how the Armée du Levant would link up with the Yugoslav military after landing in Thessaloniki. Brugère reported to Paris that the officer corps of the Yugoslav military were very anti-German while being very pro-French and pro-British, making them very much in favor of co-operation with Britain and France should the Danzig crisis lead to war.

In the hot summer of 1939, the Danzig crisis brought Europe to the brink of war, and Prince Paul was thrown into deep depression at the prospect. Sir Ronald Campbell, the British minister in Belgrade, in a cable on 26 August 1939 to the Foreign Secretary, Lord Halifax, wrote that Paul was "in the last stages of despair". Halifax wrote on the margin of a letter he received from Paul asking for British support on the same day that he was just suffering from another attack of manic depression, which Paul was a chronic sufferer from. Brugère, who very much liked Paul, expressed more sympathy and tried to keep his spirits up. The British historian D.C. Watt wrote that Brugère was "endlessly sympathetic" who had a melancholic disposition even at the best of times, and was very despondent at the prospect of war. Paul often looked out of the window of his office, observing that the city of Belgrade was doomed, and would be destroyed once again if war came. Brugère in a cable to Paris on 27 August 1939 stated if the Danzig crisis should lead to Germany invading Poland, then France should reactivate Salonika front strategy by sending the Armée du Levant to Thessaloniki and march north into Yugoslavia with the ultimate aim of aiding Poland. Brugère also accepted Paul's arguments that Italy was bound to enter the war on the Axis side if the Danzig crisis should lead to war, and he argued very strongly that France along with Britain should take up Paul's idea of a "pre-emptive war" against Italy.

== World War Two ==
On 1 September 1939, Germany activated Fall Weiss (Case White) and invaded Poland. On 3 September 1939, Britain and France declared war on Germany. Benito Mussolini wanted to honor the Pact of Steel by declaring war on Britain and France, but King Victor Emmanuel III, who had the ultimate power in Italy, refused to sign the declarations of war. Much to his humiliation, Mussolini was forced to declare Italy neutral in the war.

On 3 September 1939, Prince Paul met with Brugère to request that the French land an army at Thessaloniki with the understanding that the French would ultimately head north into Yugoslavia. Paul told Brugère that through Yugoslavia was neutral, but that his sympathies were completely with the Allies. Paul further stated that he would have Yugoslavia enter the war on the Allied side the moment that he thought the Allies were in a position to aid Yugoslavia, saying that the backwardness of Yugoslavia made it impossible for his country to fight against the Reich at present. Brugère wrote that Paul had told him that there was:"... non aucu semblant de vérité et de sincérité n’est sorti de la bouche de Mussolini et de celle de Ciano...Le comte de Ciano déclarait au Ministre de Yugoslavie à Rome que la neutralité italienne serait 'vigilante’ et qu’elle ne durerait qu’aussi longtemps que les intérêts de l’Axe, non engagés dans l’affaire de Dantzig, ne seraient pas enjeu...Il [Prince Paul] souhaite que nous arrivions le plus tôt possible à Salonique avec ou sans consentement de l’Italie" ("...no any semblance of truth and sincerity from the mouths of Mussolini and that of Ciano...Count Ciano had declared to the Minister of Yugoslavia in Rome that Italian neutrality would be 'vigilant' and that it would not last so long as Axis interests, not engaged in the matter of Danzig, were not at stake...He [Prince Paul] wishes that we arrived as soon as possible in Salonica with or without consent of Italy".) Paul advised Brugère not to trust Mussolini, who despite have declared neutrality, was bound to come into the war on the side of Germany. Brugère reported to Paris that Paul as a sign of his good faith, was willing to allow military materials from France to be transported across Yugoslavia to Romania with the understanding that the ultimate designation was Poland. Through Metaxas leaned in a pro-Allied direction, but still had doubts about the consequences of reviving the Salonika front strategy. However, General Alexandros Papagos, the chief of the Greek general staff, wanted the Allies to land at Thessaloniki, seeing it as the best way of preserving Greek independence.

The French were very keen to revive the Salonika front strategy of World War I, but the British were opposed. Unfortunately, for Paul, the Italians had stolen the keys to the British diplomatic codes via a burglary at the British embassy in Rome in 1935. Count Galeazzo Ciano, the Italian Foreign Minister, knowing of the differences between French and British strategies via reading the British diplomatic cables, portrayed Italian neutrality as being more sincere than what it really was in his meetings with the British ambassador, Sir Percy Loraine and argued to him that any Allied landing at Thessaloniki would be a provocation that would drive Italy towards Germany. On 9 September 1939, the British ambassador in Paris, Sir Eric Phipps, presented a note which read: "“Le Gouvernement de Sa Majesté est convaincu de la nécessité de ne prendre actuellement aucune initiative qui puisse entraîner l’Italie à se joindre à l’Allemagne. Nos communications à travers la Méditerranée sont vitales pour nous et pour la France, et en aucun cas elles ne doivent être mises en danger. “Il est impossible d’estimer le pour et le contre d’une action dans les États balkaniques sans tenir compte des conséquences presque certaines qu’ une telle action entraînerait sur la politique italienne et qui serait pleine de dangers pour notre cause commune. L’information contenue dans un télégramme de l’ambassadeur de Sa Majesté à Rome est très significative à cet égard. Dans la situation actuelle Lord Halifax se range dans l’ensemble à l’avis de Sir Percy Loraine. A l’heure actuelle, toute l’action dans le Sud-est de l’Europe qui risquerait de rendre plus probable l’entrée de l’Italie en guerre contre nous devrait être évitée avec soin" ("His Majesty's Government are convinced of the necessity of taking no initiative at this time which might induce Italy to join Germany. Our communications across the Mediterranean are vital for us and for France, and under no circumstances should they be endangered. It is impossible to estimate the pros and cons of action in the Balkan States without taking into account the almost certain consequences that such action would entail on Italian politics and which would be full of dangers for our common cause. The information contained in a telegram from His Majesty's Ambassador in Rome is very significant in this regard. In the present situation Lord Halifax generally agrees with Sir Percy Loraine. At the present time, any action in Southeastern Europe which might make Italy more likely to enter the war against us should be carefully avoided").

By January 1940, Brugère was convinced that Paul have Yugoslavia enter the war on the Allied side, provided that the Allies landed at Thessaloniki and had operational control of the Mediterranean and Adriatic seas. When Italy declared war on France on 10 June 1940, Brugère sought to invoke the Franco-Yugoslav alliance and told Paul that he should declare war on Italy at once. Brugère felt that having Yugoslavia invade the Italian colony of Albania would take the pressure off France. Paul refused under the grounds that Italy was allied to Germany in the Pact of Steel, and it was evident that France was going to be defeated.

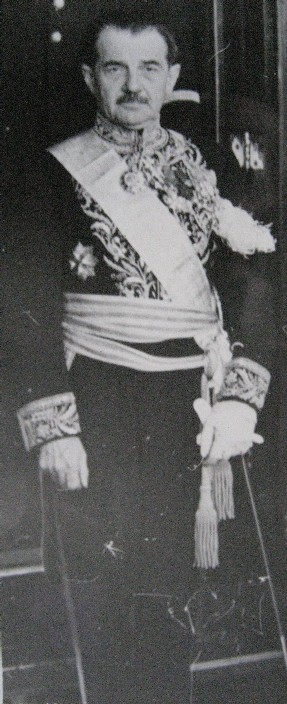
Raymond Brugère as ambassador to Belgium, 1945.

On 17 June 1940, Brugère resigned in protest at the decision to sign an armistice with Germany. In a famous public cable he sent to Marshal Philippe Pétain announcing his resignation that serving as: "Représentant de la France dans un pays qui, jadis, a continué 3 ans la lutte à nos côtés sans avoir gardé la moindre parcelle de son territoire, j'éprouve un serrement de cœur à la pensée que les Yougoslaves pourront légitimement dire que ce qu'ils ont fait, nous avons été incapables de l'entreprendre. Ma résolution est prise : je refuse de servir un gouvernement, fut-il présidé par le Vainqueur de Verdun, qui signerait la capitulation de la France" ("the representative of France in a country which, in the past, continued the struggle at our side for 3 years without having kept any part of its territory, I feel a pang of the heart. The thought that the Yugoslavs will be able to legitimately say that what they have done we have been unable to undertake. My resolution is taken: I refuse to serve a government, even if it chaired by the Victor of Verdun, which would sign the surrender of France.") Brugère was referring to the famous retreat of the Serbian Army, which after its defeat in October 1915, had followed by thousands of Serb refugees, undertaken an arduous march across the mountains of Albania in the winter of 1915–16 to be picked up by British and French ships waiting by the shores of the Adriatic Sea. Afterwards, the Serbian Army went to Thessaloniki to continue the struggle until Serbia was liberated. Brugère felt that rather than signing the armistice with Nazi Germany that Pétain should have followed the Serb example by taking the French government and as many French troops as possible to Algeria to continue the war. Brugère mockingly wrote that to cross the Mediterranean Sea in June from Marseilles to Algiers was considerably more easier than crossing the Accursed Mountains of Albania in the dead of winter.

Brugère also noted that France had signed a treaty with Great Britain forbidding either power to sign an armistice with Germany, thus leading him to argue that the armistice was illegal. The French historian Annie Lacroix-Riz called Brugère "the only diplomat to embody national resistance and sovereignty in June 1940". Brugère further argued that the manner in which Marshal Pétain abolished the French constitution with the National Assembly voting to give him dictatorial powers was illegal, arguing that 569 forfeitures of the votes of the deputies vs. 80 votes for could not in any meaningful sense of the term constitute legality.

Brugère returned to France, where he joined a Gaullist resistance group. Prince Paul was sad to see Brugère leave Belgrade. After the armistice, the Germans pressed the new Vichy government to bring Daladier and the other French leaders to trial for declaring war on the Reich in 1939. In a letter to Daladier on 15 September 1940, Brugère wrote that such a trial: "would be more against France still more than yourself; it would in my eyes add considerably to our mistakes and to our misfortunes; as well as our lack of dignity, to add with public complicity or public silence to the legend that the war Hitler wanted could have been avoided or delayed and that the responsibility for its outbreak falls, with the exception of the Foreign Ministry, on the French government that was then in power". Brugère had assumed wrongly as it turned out that the main defendant at the trial would be Daladier; in fact, the Germans wanted the main defendants to be Georges Mandel and Paul Reynaud, the two main "anti-German" politicians in the last years of the Third Republic.

Much to the intense chagrin of Charles de Gaulle, the United States recognized Vichy regime as the legitimate government of France until November 1942, maintaining an embassy in Vichy with Admiral William D. Leahy serving as the American ambassador. Brugère was in contact with Leahy, using him as a means of reaching out to his close friend, President Franklin D. Roosevelt. Brugère felt that Leahy was an ignoramus who more than anybody else turned Roosevelt against de Gaulle. Brugère stated that Leahy was man who spoke very poor French and was profoundly ignorant about France, which led him to the conclusion that Marshal Pétain was a reluctant collaborator who could be persuaded to re-enter the war on the Allied side. Brugère stated that Leahy was fundamentally wrong in his assessment of Pétain, and that his misdiagnosis of Vichy led Roosevelt to shun de Gaulle with a disastrous impact on Franco-American relations.

Brugère was interned by the French police on 8 November 8, 1942 when it was discovered that he was in contact with the French National Committee in London. On 8 June 1944, Brugère was freed by the Resistance. On 21 September 1944, he was appointed as the Secretary-General (number two position) at the Quai d'Orsay under the Foreign Minister Georges Bidault. On his first day in office, Brugère met an American diplomat, Selden Chapin, to press for American recognition of de Gaulle's provisional government, saying that the American policy was "injurious not only to France, but in the long run to our own interests". Brugère told Chapin: "While your government states it never had any admiration for the Pétain government, it is difficult for me was imprisoned in Vichy when you had an ambassador to that government to find that you do not recognize a government which has restored me to freedom and which is founded on liberty and is accepted by all Frenchmen".

Brugère was against having diplomatic relations with Ireland, which had recognized the Vichy government. Sean Murphy, the Irish minister in Paris, met with Brugère to discuss having Ireland switch over to recognizing de Gaulle's provisional government. On 5 October 1944, Murphy reported to Dublin: "I was very coldly received and rudely received by the Secretary General." Brugère rejected Murphy's argument that “the Government de facto was the Government de jure, and the moment the Pétain Government had disappeared”, Ireland entered into diplomatic relations with de Gaulle's government. Murphy reported that Brugère “became irritable at the mention of the word ‘de facto’".

As Secretary-General, Brugère drew up rules for the purge of collaborators from the Quai d'Orsay, ruling that all those fired under Vichy would have to be reinstated; those who had joined under Vichy would have to retake their examinations; and those diplomats who joined the Resistance would be preferred for promotion. Brugère dispatched Christian Fouchet to Poland to examine the Lublin government's claims to be the legitimate government of Poland and to contact French POWs recently released by the Red Army. Brugère's relations with Bidault were difficult, causing him to resign after only three weeks on the job. Having become a Belgianophile during his time in Brussels, Brugère lobbied President Charles de Gaulle to appoint him ambassador to Belgium.

== Ambassador in Brussels ==
Brugère served as the French ambassador in Brussels from 4 October 1944 to November 1947, when he retired. During his time as ambassador to Belgium, Brugère worked for closer Franco-Belgian ties and sympathized more with Walloon politicians than Flemish ones. Brugère proved to be a highly controversial ambassador, who was widely accused of supporting Walloon politicians to make Belgium into a French-speaking state. Belgian politics were torn between a dispute over whatever King Leopold III-who signed an armistice with Nazi Germany in 1940-should be allowed to return to his throne. Brugère was also accused of supporting the antiléopoldistes who believed the king should abdicate on the account of having signed the armistice. The léopoldistes who supported the king's return to his throne often accused Brugère of interference in Belgian internal affairs. The dispute between the antiléopoldistes and the léopoldistes was such that there were serious fears of a civil war in Belgium with conservatives and Flemings supporting the king's return while liberals and Walloons were opposed. In 1946, a group called Quebec-Wallonie appeared that called for Wallonia to break away from Belgium and Quebec to break away from Canada, arguing these two areas, which were both part of the "French cultural empire" had a similar background. A Canadian diplomat, Marcel Cadieux, thought that the writing style of the Quebec-Wallonie group's manifesto closely resembled the writing style of Brugère.

During his time in Brussels, Brugère was very concerned about the way that the Belgian press covered the war in the French colony of Indochina where the Communist Viet Minh guerrillas were fighting for independence. About the pro-Viet Minh coverage in Communist newspapers such as Le Drapeau rouge, Brugère was highly annoyed, writing of "perfectly tendentious" articles, which he believed were the result of a propaganda offensive by the Soviet Union to defame France. Brugère blamed the French Communist Party, which was then in the French government, for the articles, writing that L'Humanité would not criticize a government that it was a part of, but would subcontract the work out to French language Belgian newspapers such as Le Drapeau rouge to criticize the war in Indochina.

Brugère was especially offended by an article in the Socialist newspaper Le Peuple on 20 December 1946 by a political scientist, Grégoire Koulischer, that appealed to the British Labour Prime Minister Clement Attlee and the French Socialist premier Léon Blum to end their empires peacefully, saying the age of European imperialism was closing and to resist the demands for independence would lead to pointless bloodshed as independence was inevitable for the British and French colonies. Koulischer accused the French Army of recruiting Wehrmacht veterans into the French Foreign Legion, whom he further accused of committing frightful atrocities against Vietnamese civilians. By contrast, Koulischer wrote that the Viet Minh had behaved decently and had only executed Vietnamese who had collaborated with the Japanese. Brugère wrote that this article was "even more unpleasant and malicious" than the ones in Le Drapeau rouge, and he made a formal complaint to the leaders of the Belgian Socialist Party about the article. Brugère also handed in a formal letter of protest to the Belgian Socialist Foreign Minister Paul-Henri Spaak about Koulisher's article, saying he had tarnished the good name of the French Foreign Legion. Brugère asked Victor Larock, the editor of Le Peuple, not to run any more articles critical of the Indochina war. Larock apologized to Brugère for the article, saying it was an editorial oversight on his part, and stated the highly negative picture of French rule in Vietnam in Koulisher's article was due to a French Army nurse recently returned from the war who had contacted Koulischer.

To counter the criticism, Brugère encouraged Face à Main, a liberal Brussels weekly run on 4 January 1947 a flattening story on France's mission civilisatrice (civilizing mission) in Vietnam and portrayed Admiral Georges Thierry d'Argenlieu, the French High Commissioner for Indochina, in a very favorable light . On 21 January 1947, La Nation, a conservative Brussels daily ran an article that praised French colonialism in Vietnam, which Brugère reported to Paris that he helped to inspire. On 26 February 1947, a Belgian newspaper, La Libre Belgique, published an article by a Catholic priest who served as a missionary in Vietnam, Father Emmanuel Jacques-Houssa, that was somewhat sympathetic towards the Viet Minh. In a report to Paris, Brugère wrote that "such nonsense in a newspaper known to be biased is likely to do us more good than harm", writing that such articles were the result of an "imbroglio of anti-French intrigues".

On 23 February 1947, Brugère was to confront a Vietnamese Catholic priest, Vincent Kuu, who was to deliver a pro-independence speech at a meeting of the Christian Workers' Youth in Brussels. However, Kuu had been arrested at the Franco-Belgian border by the Belgian police for insufficient identity documents. Instead, Father Houssa replaced him, leading to a lively debate about the merits of the mission civilisatrice in Indochina. Brugère's friend Claudel in a letter to his son wrote that Brugère had sent an "inflammatory telegram" to Georges Bidault concerning the "Royal Question" in Belgium about the Regent Charles who was acting as the head of state for his older brother. Still unable to work effectively with Bidault, Brugère retired as ambassador in 1947.

== Later years ==
In retirement, Brugère became active in Gaullist politics. Brugère was a founding member of the Gaullist Rassemblement du Peuple Français and served as a Gaullist deputy in the National Assembly. Lanneau described Brugère as "fervently Gaullist" in his politics. Brugère did not become a cabinet minister under de Gaulle, but he served as the chairman of the Foreign Affairs Committee in the National Assembly. He was also taken up with his literacy studies, publishing in 1957 a book Courtes mais éblouissantes vies ministérielles parallèles de Chateaubriand et Lamartine 1823–1848, a parallel biography of François-René de Chateaubriand and Alphonse de Lamartine. Another book, Ambassade de Choiseul-Gouffier à Constantinople, 1784-1792 (1958) was a biography of Marie-Gabriel-Florent-Auguste de Choiseul-Gouffier, the classicist who served as the last ambassador of ancien régime France to the Ottoman Empire.

His 1962 book Noblesse et rigueur du métier diplomatique caused controversy where he wrote: "La franc-maçonnerie, sous le proconsulat Chautemps-Leger, fut tout aussi insinuante. L’ascension, grâce à elle, d’Alexis Leger au secrétariat général du Ministère en février 1933 ne fut pas heureuse, d’autant moins heureuse que son origine guadeloupéenne excita sans aucun profit pour nous des réticences raciales qui se manifestèrent de façon fort déplaisante, lorsque Daladier eut la singulière idée de l’emmener avec lui à Munich....e dois d’ailleurs ajouter que le Grand Orient n’a jamais compté beaucoup d’adhérents parmi nous. Dans une étude récente de Serge Hutin, sur la franc-maçonnerie, le Quai d’Orsay est même qualifié de “fief catholique” ce qui est excessif quand on pense au nombre et à la qualité des Protestants qui s’y trouvent en bonne place, ce qui assure un heureux contrepoids à ceux qui pourraient être tentés de suivre une attitude trop vaticane dans la conduite de notre politique extérieure" ("Freemasonry, under the Chautemps-Leger proconsulate, was just as insinuating. The rise, thank to them, of Alexis Leger to the General Secretariat of the Ministry in February 1933 was not happy, all the less happy as his Guadeloupe origin excited without any profit for us racial reluctances which manifested themselves in a very unpleasant way, when Daladier had the singular idea of taking him with him to Munich...I must also add that the Grand Orient has never had many adherents among us. In a recent study by Serge Hutin, on Freemasonry, the Quai d'Orsay is even described as a "Catholic stronghold" which is excessive when you think of the number and quality of Protestants who are there in a good place, which provides a happy counterweight to those who might be tempted to adopt an excessively Vatican attitude in the conduct of our foreign policy").

Brugère defined the role of an ambassador in Noblesse et rigueur du métier diplomatique as: "Un ambassadeur est un missionnaire...Les agents placés hors du périmètre d’urgence, où tout le monde, dans le désordre, leur donne ordres et contre-ordres, sont plus que jamais livrés à eux-mêmes avec juste pour ressource celle du missionnaire, perdu dans le Grand Nord, qui, son travail d’évangélisation poursuivi, en est réduit à écrire chaque semaine à la Sainte Vierge" ("An ambassador is a missionary...The agents placed outside of the emergency perimeter, where everyone, in disorder, gives them orders and counter-orders, are more than ever left to their own devices, just like a missionary, lost in the Great North, who in his work of evangelization, is reduced to writing every week to the Blessed Virgin").

Brugère died in Châtenoy where he owned a chateau in the countryside.

== Books by Brugère ==
- Veni, vidi Vichy,1944, Paris: Calmann-Levy, second edition as Veni, vidi Vichy... et la suite Témoignages, 1940-1945, 1953, Paris: Deux-Rives
- Hommages Français à Paul Hymans Brussels: l'Avenue, 1944.
- Courtes mais éblouissante vie ministérielle parallèles de Chateaubriand et Lamartine, 1957.
- Mémoires d'outre-Monge, À l'ombre de l'Élysée en pleurs, Paris: du Manuscrit, 1961
- Noblesse et rigueur du métier diplomatique, Paris: Alfort, 1962

== Books and articles ==
- Alexander, Martin S. (2003). The Republic in Danger General Maurice Gamelin and the Politics of French Defence, 1933–1940. Cambridge: Cambridge University Press. ISBN 978-0-521-52429-2.
- Balfour, Neil (1980). Paul of Yugoslavia, Britain's Maligned Friend. London: H. Hamilton. ISBN 9780241103920.
- Batowski, Henryk (September 1968). "Proposal for a second front in the Balkans in September 1939". Balkan Studies. 9 (2): 335–344.
- Brugère, Raymond (1953). Veni, vidi Vichy ... et la suite Témoignagnes, 1940–1945. Paris: Deux-Rives.
- Brugère, Raymond (1962). Noblesse et rigueur du métier diplomatique. Paris: Alfort.
- Chapin, Selden (1965). "The Acting American Representative to the French Committee of National Liberation in Paris to the Secretary of State". Foreign Relations of the United States. Washington D.C.: United States Government Publishing Office. pp. 736–737.
- Claudel, Paul (1990). Lettres à son fils Henri et à sa famille. Paris: L'Age d'homme. ISBN 9782825100394.
- Cloutier, David (Fall 2011). "Le Canada et l'Exposition universelle de Paris 1937, une occasion manquée ?". Bulletin d'histoire politique. 20 (1): 54–59. doi:10.7202/1055962ar.
- Duroselle, Jean-Baptiste (2004). France and the Nazi Threat: The Collapse of French Diplomacy 1932-1939. New York: Enigma Books.
- Ferragu, Gilles; Michel, Florian (2016). "Introduction générale". In Gillees Ferragu & Florian Michel (ed.). Diplomatie et religion: Au cœur de l'action culturelle de la France au XXe siècle. Paris: Éditions de la Sorbonne. pp. 7–21. ISBN 9791035103545.
- Hadzi-Jovancic, Perica (2020). The Third Reich and Yugoslavia An Economy of Fear, 1933–1941. London: Bloomsbury Publishing. ISBN 978-1-350-13806-3.
- Herbst, James (2019). The Politics of Apoliticism Political Trials in Vichy France, 1940–1942. Berlin: De Gruyter. ISBN 978-3-11-061016-1.
- Jackson, Peter (2013). Beyond the Balance of Power France and the Politics of National Security in the Era of the First World War. Cambridge: Cambridge University Press. ISBN 978-1-107-03994-0.
- Kelly, Brendan (2019). The Good Fight Marcel Cadieux and Canadian Diplomacy. Vancouver: UBC Press. ISBN 9780774860024.
- Kritz, Neil J. (1995). Transitional Justice How Emerging Democracies Reckon with Former Regimes. Washington D.C.: United States Institute of Peace Press. ISBN 9781878379443.
- Lanneau, Catherine (2008). L'inconnue française: la France et les Belges francophones, 1944–1945. Bern: Peter Lang. ISBN 978-9052013978.
- Lanneau, Catherine (January 2011). "Contre-Propagande Sur L'Indochine La France Officielle Face À L'Anticolonialisme en Belgique Francophone (1946–1950)". Guerres Mondiales et Conflits Contemporains. 241 (1): 75–90. doi:10.3917/gmcc.241.0075. hdl:2268/91282.
- Lacroix-Riz, Annie (2016). Les élites françaises entre 1940 et 1944 De la collaboration avec l'Allemagne à l'alliance américaine. Paris: Armand Colin. ISBN 9782200614973.
- Massie, Justin (2013). Francosphere l'importance de la France dans la culture strategique du Canada. Quebec City: Presses de l'Universite du Quebec. ISBN 9782760536067.
- Palo, Michael (2019). Neutrality as a Policy Choice for Small/Weak Democracies Learning from the Belgian Experience. Amsterdam: Brill. ISBN 9789004395855.
- Pavlowitch, Stevan K. (1985). Unconventional perceptions of Yugoslavia, 1940-1945. New York: East European Monographs. ISBN 9780880330817.
- Pellicone, Diane (2012). "Politics of Style Travel, Modernism, and the French Embassy". Render. 1 (1): 1–10.
- Pierron, Jean-Louis (July 1991). "La Mission de Christian Fouchet en Pologne 28 Décembre 1944-31 Mars 1945". Guerres Mondiales et Conflits Contemporains. 163 (7): 75–90.
- Prentice, Robert (2021). Princess Olga of Yugoslavia Her Life and Times. New York. ISBN 9781839755521.
- Shipley White, Dorothy (1964). Seeds of Discord De Gaulle, Free France and the Allies. Syracuse: Syracuse University Press.
- Thomas, Martin (1999). "France and the Czechoslovak Crisis". In Igor Lukes; Erik Goldstein (eds.). The Munich Crisis, 1938 Prelude to World War II. London: Frank Cass. pp. 122–159.
- Watt, Donald Cameron (1989). How War Came The Immediate Origins of the Second World War, 1938–39. London: Heinemannm.
- Weinberg, Gerhard (1970). The Foreign Policy of Hitler's Germany Diplomatic Revolution in Europe 1933–36. Chicago: University of Chicago Press.
- Wheeler, Mark (1980). Britain and the War for Yugoslavia, 1940–1943. New York: Columbia University Press. ISBN 978-0-914710-57-8.
- Vaǐsse, Maricure (1990). "D'instinct, les diplomates n'aiment pas les ruptures des relations (15 juin-20 juillet 1940)". In Haim Shamir (ed.). France and Germany in an Age of Crisis, 1900–1960 Studies in Memory of Charles Bloch. Amsterdam: E.J. Brill. pp. 145–161. ISBN 9789004092280.
