= Robert Coulondre =

French diplomat (1885–1959)

- Born: 11 September 1885; Nîmes, France
- Died: 6 March 1959 (aged 73); Paris, France
- Occupation: Diplomat
- Years active: 1909-1949
- Known for: Ambassador to the Soviet Union (1936-38) and to Germany (1938-1939)
- Notable work: De Staline à Hitler : souvenirs de deux ambassades : 1936-1939
- Spouse: Pauline Meyer
- Children: Simone Coulondre; Jean Coulondre; Pierre Coulondre

Robert Coulondre (11 September 1885 – 6 March 1959) was a French diplomat who served as the last French ambassador to Germany before World War II.

== From Nîmes to Geneva ==
Coulondre was born in Nîmes, the son of the politician Gaston Coulondre. As the Coulondres were a Protestant family, they were very loyal to the republic with its principles of Liberté, Égalité, Fraternité for all people. French Protestants had been oppressed under the ancien-regime following the revocation of the Edict of Nantes in 1685, and for Protestants the French Revolution with its promise of a secular society and Liberté, Égalité, Fraternité was very attractive. After obtaining a university degree in Chinese, he joined the Quai d'Orsay in 1909. Coulondre was stationed in London in May 1909, was appointed attaché at the Foreign Minister's office in March 1912 and became assistant consul in Beirut in 1912. In August 1914, as World War I started, Colondre was commissioned as a lieutenant in the 117th Infantry Regiment. On 13 September 1914 he won the Croix de Guerre and the Legion of honor for bravery in an action against the invading Germans. In November 1915, he was transferred from the Western Front to the Armées alliées en Orient which had landed in the Greek city of Salonika to start an offensive to support Serbia. The diplomat François Georges-Picot recruited Coulondre, a fluent Arabic speaker who had formally served in Beirut to serve as one of his agents in the Middle East. In 1916, he was appointed the French representative to the Arab Office in Cairo that was supporting the Great Arab Revolt in the Hejez against the Ottoman Empire. Coulondre helped negotiate the Sykes-Picot agreement of May 1916 laying out the British and French spheres of influence in the Middle East after the anticipated defeat of the Ottoman Empire. In 1917–1918, Coulondre served alongside the diplomats Louis Massignon and Charles Maugras on the Sykes-Picot mission laying the borders between the spheres of influence.

In October 1918, Coulondre protested on behalf of France against the actions of the Emir Faisal in attempting to occupy all of Lebanon while asking Paris to dispatch the French Navy to land marines in the coastal cities of Lebanon "before it was too late". Coulondre also delivered a protest to the Emir Faisal, pointing out the Sykes-Picot Agreement had assigned Lebanon to France, leading Faisal to claim his reasons for sending the Arab Northern Army into Lebanon were "purely military". A British attempt to persuade Coulondre to accept the authority of Shurki al-Ayubi, Faisal's governor in Lebanon, as a civil governor under French military authority, was unsuccessful while Coulondre insisting that mostly Christian Lebanon was in the French sphere of influence and he would not have Faisal's representatives from the Muslim Hejaz playing any role in Lebanon. Coulondre met with Field Marshal Sir Edmund Allenby, who apologised to him, insisting it was all a "misunderstanding", and ordered Ayubli out of Beirut on the night of 10 October 1918. The next day, the flag of the Hejaz was lowered while the French tricolor was raised over Beirut. On 16 October 1918, Coulondre told Gilbert Clayton that France wanted to occupy the Beqaa Valley in accordance with the Sykes-Picot Agreement, which was rejected by the British who assigned the valley to Faisal's agents. For the next two years, an uneasy truce prevailed with Faisal insisting that the Lebanese were Arabs and belonged in his state while the French argued that the Maronite Christians did not want to join a Muslim-dominated state. In May 1919, he married Pauline Meyer and was sent to Rabat, Morocco as the French consul. In November 1920, he went to Paris to join the Commercial Relations Sub-Department of the Quai d'Orsay.

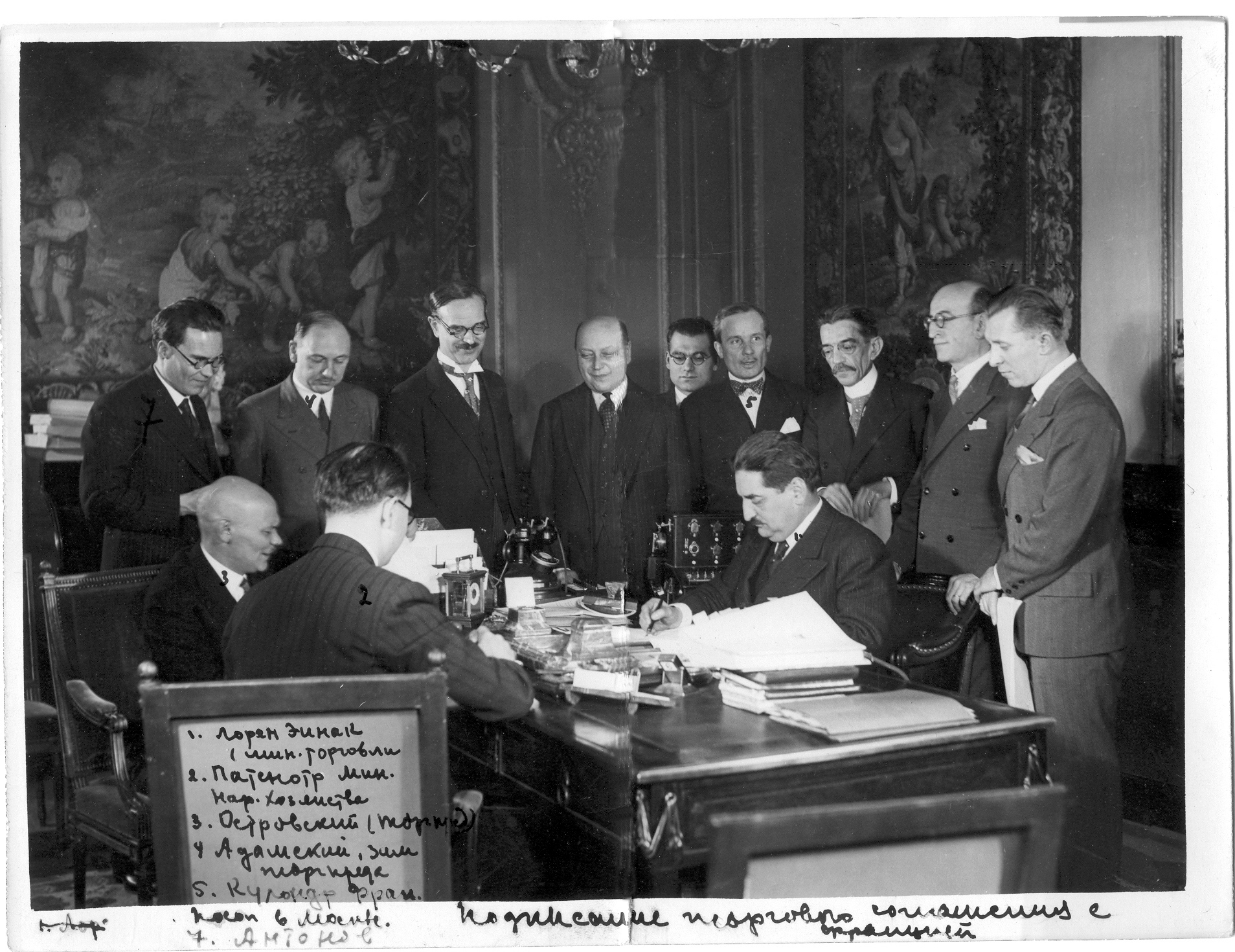
Signing of the first Franco-Soviet trade agreement 1 November 1934. Coulondre is the man marked 5 in the photograph, fourth from the right.

In January 1926 he was a delegate to Franco-Soviet economic negotiations. French investors have been by far the largest buyers of Russian bonds issued before 1917 and had invested the most capital in the Russian Empire, and thus were the ones most hurt by the nationalisations carried out by the Soviet regime and by the debt repudiation of 1918, the largest debt repudiation of all time. A key problem in Franco-Soviet relations in the 1920s was the French demand that the Soviet Union honor the debts repudiated in 1918 and pay compensation to the French investors whose assets in Russia had been nationalised without compensation, demands that the Soviet government consistently rejected. From 1927 to 28 February 1933, he headed the Commercial Relations Department of the Political and Commercial Directorate and subsequently Deputy Director of the Political and Commercial Directorate at the Quai d'Orsay working under the Political Director René Massigli. Coulondre was a member of the "Protestant clan" that dominated the Quai d'Orsay in the first part of the 20th century. From 1920 to 1936, Coulondre had closely studied the German economy and in 1931 when the premier, Pierre Laval, visited Berlin to discuss the crisis caused by the collapse of the banks in Central Europe, Coulondre had accompanied him as an adviser.

The leading members of the "Protestant clan" were Coulondre, René Massigli, Victor de Lacroix, Albert Kamerer, Jacques Seydoux de Clausonne and his son François Seydoux de Clausonne, all of whom knew each other and worked closely together. Since French Protestants were persecuted under the ancien-regime when the state religion was Roman Catholicism, French Protestants tended to be very supportive of the legacy of the French Revolution. The "Protestant clan" in the Quai d'Orsay were all supporters of the republic and its values of Liberté, Égalité, Fraternité in domestic affairs while favoring a rule-based international order, support for the League of Nations, opposition to appeasement, and an abhorrence of Nazi Germany as the antithesis of everything they believed in.

In 1935, as the French delegate to the League of Nations, he pressed for more raw materials to be included in the sanctions applied against Fascist Italy for invading Ethiopia. On 17 October 1935, he pressed the Canadian delegate to the League of Nations in Geneva, Walter Alexander Riddell, to have nickel added to the sanctions list, to the oblivious discomfort of Riddell as nickel was a major Canadian export. Riddell refused to add nickel to the sanctions list, despite Coulondre pressing him on that point. Coulondre reported to Paris that Riddell had told him that Canada "would not put forward any definite motion as to specific materials, but did note that such materials included should be embargoed in all forms." In response to the demand to add iron to the sanctions list, Coulondre met with Riddell and the South African delegate, Charles Te Water to make a proposal to add the derivatives of iron to the sanctions list, only for Riddell to prevaricate on the issue. Coulondre suggested that either Te Water or Riddell propose that derivatives from iron be added to the sanctions list. On 19 October 1935, in response to a protest from the Spanish delegate Salvador de Madariaga about the exclusion of finished iron from the sanctions list, Coulondre stated that the major iron producers such as the United States were not members of the League. In a speech on 2 November 1935, Coulondre argued that adding steel to the sanctions list was "through logical, but not practical", and that allowing Italy to import finished steel would damage the Italian economy by forcing the Italian government to use up its foreign exchange than by adding steel to the sanctions list.

== Ambassador in Moscow ==
=== Mission to the Kremlin ===
In 1936, he was appointed the French ambassador to the Soviet Union. The Quai d'Orsay was one of the most prestigious branches of the French state, and ambassadors were an elite group within the Quai d'Orsay, having the right to be addressed as "your excellency", to wear a ceremonial embodied uniform that was meant to impress and since ambassadors represented the president of the republic, in theory ambassadors outranked the foreign minister in protocol. Between 1932 and 1939, only 30 diplomats were promoted up to the rank of ambassador, making Coulondre part of a very select group. Coulondre went to Moscow with two guiding principles with the first being that Nazi Germany was a menace that had to be stopped and the second being that the best way to do that was an alliance with the Soviet Union. Coulondre was chosen as the ambassador to Moscow by the Popular Front government of Léon Blum, who felt that an experienced diplomat well known for calling for closer ties to Moscow was the ideal man to represent France to the Kremlin. Coulondre later wrote that the Quai d'Orsay's information about the Soviet Union was almost non-existent as discovered looking through the files "that relations with the USSR, established in 1924, had been neither very close nor very well cultivated since then, notwithstanding the pacts".

Coulondre described his superior, the Foreign Minister, Yvon Delbos, as being paranoid about the Soviets and fearful that the alliance that France had signed with the Soviets in 1935 was merely a device which Joseph Stalin might use to "push" France into a war with Germany. Delbos in giving his instructions to Coulondre openly wondered aloud "...whether they [the Soviets] were not looking to push us into a conflict with Germany". Delbos further stated that if war with came with Germany, France was destined to lose because: "If defeated it [France] would be Nazified. If victorious, it must, due to the destruction of German power, submit, with the rest of Europe, to the overwhelming weight of the Slavic world, armed with the communist flamethrower". Coulondre recalled in his 1950 memoirs De Staline à Hitler Souvenirs de deux ambassades, 1936-1939 that "the presentation of his [Delbos's] statement was made completely in a negative sense". Coulondre was told in his instructions that there was no question of a "preventive war" to put an end to the Nazi regime while its rearmament had just started, and he would was to refuse any Soviet offer about a "preventive war"; that he must end Soviet involvement in French internal affairs; and should a war come, he was to discuss "possible military aid" to the Soviet Union.

Another part of Coulondre's mission in Moscow was to present Stalin with a choice between promoting the French Communist Party or building an anti-German alliance. When Coulondre presented his credentials as an ambassador for the republic to the Soviet Chairman Mikhail Kalinin, he received a blast when Kalinin told him that the French were not treating their alliance seriously with Kalinin chiding him for the unwillingness of the French general staff to open up staff talks with their Soviet counterparts. Kalinin criticized France for refusing to sell the Soviet Union weapons and complained that even Germany offered up better trade terms than France as the Reich, unlike France, was willing to deal with the Soviet Union on credit. Coulondre often told his hosts that many of the French right were willing to accept an alliance with the Soviets to stop Germany, but the militant ultra-leftwing line pursued by the French communists terrified them. At his first meeting with the Foreign Commissar Maxim Litvinov in October 1936, Coulondre stated: "I have come here without prejudice for or against the Russia of the Soviets. I am, however, a convinced partisan of the assistance pact because I believe it to be one of the elements necessary for the safeguarding of the peace to which both nations are equally attached...Well then, I have to tell you if things continue as they're now going, there will be no more assistance pact. French public opinion is sick and tired of Comintern meddling in the domestic affairs of France-meddling, which we know-is inspired if not directly operated by the Soviet government itself...Either it shall cease or the pact will become a dead letter". Litvinov gave the usual spurious statement that the Soviet Union had nothing to do with the operations of the Comintern, which did not get relations going well for the new French ambassador in Moscow. Coulondre frankly told Litvinov that there was much "uneasiness" in France about the Franco-Soviet alliance. For his part, Coulondre soon had the impression that the Soviets were unhappy with the Blum government's stated desire to preserve the peace, and would have much preferred that if a more traditional "tough guy" French conservative leader like Louis Barthou or Raymond Poincaré were leading France.

Shortly after his arrival in Moscow, Germany and Japan signed the Anti-Comintern Pact in November 1936. Through the Anti-Comintern Pact was officially directed against the Comintern, not the Soviet Union, this distinction was in practice meaningless, and the Anti-Comintern Pact was understood to be an anti-Soviet alliance. The Anti-Comintern Pact only committed Germany and Japan to share intelligence and to co-operate in police matters, but the mere fact that Berlin and Tokyo had reached an alliance against the Soviet Union caused much fear in Moscow of facing a two-front war with Japan attacking in Asia and Germany attacking in Europe. Coulondre reported to Paris that the Soviets wanted to strengthen the Franco-Soviet alliance as a way to counterbalance the German-Japanese bloc that had emerged. Coulondre was told that a "state of virtual war" existed on the border between the Mongolian People's Republic and the state of Manchukuo with the Soviets saying that the Japanese Kwantung Army was violating the border on an almost daily basis, leading to constant skirmishes along the frontier and it was believed that a full scale Soviet-Japanese war could break out at any moment.

=== A troubled alliance ===
As Stalin was only the First Secretary of the Communist Party, having no position in the Soviet state, Coulondre rarely saw him, which made understanding the Soviet Union very difficult. Most of the time Coulondre talked with Litvinov, whom Coulondre noted was a very intelligent man, but not a member of Stalin's inner circle and moreover was a Jew, making him an outsider. Coulondre described Litvinov to Paris as a man who seemed sincere in his belief in collective security and as someone who wanted better relations with the western powers to contain Nazi Germany, but he was not certain how much influence, if any, that Litvinov had with Stalin. From November 1936 onward, Coulondre grew increasingly frustrated with what he regarded as foot-dragging on the part of Delbos, who seemed to be looking for any excuse to terminate the alliance with the Soviet Union. In a dispatch to Delbos, Coulondre wrote "Russia's feet are not of clay, as it is currently said, but rest solidly on the Russian land which serves to nourish its steel muscles which I see growing stronger month by month". By the spring of 1937, Coulondre was predicating that it was quite possible for the Soviet Union to ally itself with Germany as he described Stalin as an opportunist who would ally himself with whatever power presented him with the best terms, and that a German-Soviet combination would be a disaster from the French viewpoint. For this reason, Coulondre was quietly critical of Delbos's efforts to "devalue" the Franco-Soviet alliance, as he warned it was dangerous to assume that a German-Soviet rapprochement was impossible.

Coulondre was frightened by the Yezhovshchina ("the Yezhov times"), seeing it as evidence of turn towards isolationism and increased xenophobia in the Soviet Union. Coulondre called the Yezhovshchina a "crisis of growth" towards what Coulondre called "counterrevolutionary absolutism", Russian nationalism as the basis of a Soviet identity, and a growing military might supported by an expanding industrial basis as the Soviet regime continued to build factories at a manic pace. Coulondre reported to Paris in October 1936 about daily life during the Yezhovshchina that: "Quand un Russe regarde une fenêtre, on ne sait jamais s'il admire le paysage ou s'il a envie de sauter" ("When a Russian looks out of a window, you never know if he is admiring the scenery or if he wants to jump"). Coulondre attended the second Moscow trial show of January 1937 and the third Moscow show trial of March 1938, often known as the "Great Trial" as the two leading accused were the former premier Alexei Rykov and Nikolai Bukharin, the leader of the moderate faction of the Communist Party (Coulondre had just missed the first Moscow show trial of August 1936). Coulondre later wrote in his memoirs that the accused in both trials "confessed in a monotonous tone...animated by a kind of automatism...all have an immense repentance...It follows for me under the evidence that they recite a lesson learned".

In another dispatch to Paris, Coulondre wrote that the most important question facing French diplomacy was not "will Russia be with us or not?", but rather "with whom will Russia go?" As the Soviet Union had signed an alliance with France's ally Czechoslovakia in 1935, one of Coulondre's main duties in Moscow was to see if it was possible for the Soviets to obtain transit rights with Poland and/or Romania to allow the Red Army to reach Czechoslovakia if Germany should attack the latter. In April 1937, Coulondre returned to Paris to take part in the discussions held by French decision-makers about what would be the place of the Soviet Union in French strategy in the event of a war with Germany. To Coulondre's disappointment, General Maurice Gamelin of the French general staff, reached the conclusion that it was not possible to make such plans as it was clear that neither Poland nor Romania would permit the Red Army transit rights. When Coulondre told Litvinov in 1937 that King Carol II of Romania was prepared to allow the Soviets overflight rights to send aid to Czechoslovakia in the event of a German invasion, Litvinov insisted on land transit rights as well, which the Romanians refused, leading to Coulondre to the conclusion that the Soviets were not serious about helping Czechoslovakia.

In June 1937, the Yezhovshchina turned on the Red Army leadership, which led Coulondre to report to Paris on 13 June 1937 that through a "more docile new generation of Bolshevists" could be assumed, the Soviet Union "risks remaining weakened and limited in its means of action...The Red Army itself cannot escape the effects of this sort of rage". Coulondre's statements that the Red Army had been weakened by the execution of much of its leadership, was used by opponents of the Franco-Soviet pact in Paris to argue that the Soviet Union was not a major power, and hence not worth cultivating. The execution of Marshal Mikhail Tukhachevsky together with seven other senior Red Army generals on charges of espionage on behalf of Germany and Japan together with plotting to overthrow Stalin on 11 June 1937 caused considerable distrust of the Red Army within the French Army, and General Maurice Gamelin ended all Franco-Soviet staff talks. Gamelin argued since that according to Pravda Marshal Tukhachevsky was a spy for Germany and Japan, then logically any information he had shared with Tukachevsky must had reached Berlin and Tokyo, and he would share no more information until the "appearance of a certain internal pacification within the USSR". Coulondre continued to press for Franco-Soviet staff talks to resume for the rest of his ambassadorship, but Gamelin remained opposed and the talks were never resumed. The Soviets attached much importance to staff talks as proof that the French were committed to the alliance, and the break-off in staff talks caused much bitterness in Moscow. In December 1937, Delbos visited all of France's allies in Eastern Europe except for the Soviet Union, Coulondre in a dispatch wrote: "that in spite of all the excuses which will be forthcoming, this will not ameliorate Franco-Soviet relations and restore confidence".

The same month, Litvinov was interviewed by the Moscow correspondent for Les Temps where he expressed himself with what Coulondre called much "avec sevérité" about Franco-Soviet relations, saying that the French were not taking the alliance very seriously. Litvinov warned that the Soviet Union would reach a rapprochement with Germany if the French continued with their present course, saying his government was very dissatisfied that the French were refusing to resume Franco-Soviet staff talks. Litvinov added that France was committed to the defense of the international system created by the Treaty of Versailles while Germany was committed to the destruction of the Versailles system. He concluded his interview by saying the Soviet Union had been excluded from the Paris peace conference of 1919 and only chose to defend the Versailles system because it wanted to, not because it had to. In response, Coulondre warned Paris that the Soviet regime "could be led eventually to envision a rapprochement with Germany. Presuming to consider an entente with the Reich as easy from the moment the USSR ceased to defend the maintenance of the status quo in Europe, he [Litvinov] added that such a thing could be arranged without the formalities of treaties...It is improbable, given the seriousness of the subject, even while speaking unofficially to a journalist, that M. Litvinov would had dared upon such a point without have been authorised in advance from on high, and his declaration appears to me as a sort of warning that the Soviet government wanted to give in a roundabout way".

=== From the Sudetenland crisis to the Munich Agreement ===
After the Anschluss, Coulondre predicted to Paris that Germany's next target would be Czechoslovakia rather than Poland. Coulondre always stated his opinion that if France had to choose between the Soviet Union and Poland as an ally, it should pick the former rather than the latter as the Soviet Union had much greater military and industrial power. Like many other French diplomats in the 1930s, Coulondre often expressed dissatisfaction with the policy of the Polish foreign minister Colonel Jozef Beck, charging that Beck was an opportunist whose plans to make Poland into a great power made him a lukewarm friend of France and that Beck was far too willing to flirt with Germany to achieve his ambitions. Coulondre stated if France had to go to war with Germany in the defense of the cordon sanitaire, it was far better to go to war for the sake of Czechoslovakia as Prague unlike Warsaw was fully committed to upholding the international order created in 1918-19 and Czechoslovakia was "the only country on which the action of the three great peaceful powers could be conjoined." The possibility that Poland might remain neutral or even join with Germany in attacking Czechoslovakia caused considerable dismay within the Quai d'Orsay. In fact, Beck had decided to have Poland fight on the Allied side in the event of war, but chose to keep that a secret out of the hope this might improve Poland's chances of gaining Teschen. The French Foreign Minister Joseph Paul-Boncour had already told Count Johannes von Welczeck, the German ambassador in Paris, that France would honor its alliance with Czechoslovakia and that a German attack on Czechoslovakia "meant war" with France. Paul-Boncour told Coulondre that the British Foreign Secretary, Lord Halifax, disapproved of France's willingness to stand by Czechoslovakia, but also stated he believed that if France went to war with Germany, then Britain would have to follow as the British could never risk the possibility of Germany defeating France. Paul-Boncour concluded that London wanted Prague to make concessions, but he believed that if it came to war, London would choose Paris over Berlin.

On 5 April 1938, Coulondre took part in a conference of the French ambassadors in Eastern Europe in Paris called by Paul-Boncour, in which it was agreed it was necessary to end the conflicts between France's allies in Eastern Europe. The principle conflicts were the disputes between Poland vs. Czechoslovakia, the Soviet Union vs. Romania, and Poland vs. the Soviet Union. Attending the conference besides for Paul-Boncour and Coulondre were Alexis St.Léger-St.Léger, the Secretary-General of the Quai d'Orsay; Léon Noël, the ambassador to Poland; Victor de Lacroix, the minister to Czechoslovakia; Raymond Brugère, the minister to Yugoslavia; and Adrien Thierry, the minister to Romania. It was agreed that as long as France's allies in Eastern Europe continued to feud with one another that the only nation that gained was Germany. Coulondre was assigned to end the vexatious question of transit rights for the Red Army, which both Poland and Romania were adamant in refusing to grant. Thierry suggested that there was some hope that King Carol II of Romania might be induced to grant transit rights for the Red Army while Noël stated there was no hope of the Poles doing likewise, which led Coulondre to state that he would try to mediate an end to the long-running Romanian-Soviet dispute over Bessarabia.

Working closely with the Czechoslovak minister in Moscow, Zdeněk Fierlinger, Coulondre worked out a deal in which the Soviet Union would recognize Bessarabia as part of Romania in exchange for Romania giving the Soviets transit rights to Czechoslovakia. In the spring of 1938, Coulondre reported in the "vague and intuitive manner one senses such things in Soviet Russia" that for the first time that Moscow might actually be serious about coming to the aid of Czechoslovakia, mentioning that Litvinov had abandoned his normal sarcastic tone to the "seriousness and moderation of one who has sensed a new responsibilities, who knew the Kremlin would play its part in the European conflict". Coulondre credited the charge to the Second Sino-Japanese War, writing that the Soviets were intensely paranoid that Japan might attack them at any moment, making them reluctant to become involved in a European war. Coulondre stated that the fact that the Republic of China had not collapsed in 1937 in the face of the Japanese invasion together with the evidence that stiffening Chinese resistance had led Japan to become bogged down in China meant the Soviets could "make a corresponding greater effort in the West". Coulondre added that the main Japanese offensive in China intended to end the war, launched in June 1938, was in the Yangtze river valley in central China was a source of great relief to Moscow since it indicated that Japan would not be invading the Soviet Union that year. In a conversation with Litvinov, Coulondre pointed out that during the Soviet-Czechoslovak alliance of 1935, the Soviet Union was only obliged to go to war if France likewise honored its alliance with Czechoslovakia signed in 1924, leading Litvinov to say that the Soviet Union was considering going to war in defense of Czechoslovakia even if France did not. Coulondre in turn pointed out that France had alliances with both Poland and Romania, which led him to strongly advise Litvinov that the Soviet Union should not to enter the territory of either state without obtaining transit rights first as otherwise France would be obliged to declare war on its ally the Soviet Union.

Just when Coulondre believed it might finally be possible to open staff talks between the French and Soviet armies, he was recalled to Paris by the new foreign minister Georges Bonnet whom he learned had very different ideas about French policy in Eastern Europe, favoring a deal that would let Germany have Eastern Europe as its sphere of influence in exchange for leaving France alone. On the day he left for Paris, 16 May 1938, Coulondre visited the British Embassy in Moscow to share information about the Red Army and to argue that the executions of much the Red Army's leadership in the Yezhovshchina had not fatally weakened the Red Army as many had believed. The British chargé de affairs, Gordon Vereker reported to London that he was "slightly mystified as to the motives of M. Coulondre's invitation, for I have always understood that he is usually reserved and uncommunicative". Vereker told Coulondre that his view was that the "Russians were Asiatics...and that with present Byzantine regime in the Kremlin anything might happen", concluding that the Red Army would be no match for the Wehrmacht and there was no point in trying to have the Soviet Union as a counterweight to Germany for that reason.

Upon arriving in Paris, Coulondre was caught up in the May Crisis. It was during the May crisis that Coulondre first learned of Bonnet's views about letting Germany have "a free hand in the East" in exchange for leaving France alone. Coulondre recalled that during the May crisis that the more he talked about France going to war with Germany, the more Bonnet insisted that it would not possible to do so unless Britain agreed to come in, which Coulondre noted did not seem very likely. Bonnet vetoed Coulondre's plans for joint Franco-Czechoslovak-Soviet staff talks, saying it might "incite certain French elements to appear bellicose". After hearing various excuses from Bonnet, which the combative Coulondre proceed to dismiss, he finally learned of what Bonnet was really seeking, namely to end all of France's alliances in eastern Europe.

During the Sudetenland crisis of 1938, Bonnet insisted that France would only risk war with Germany in defense of Czechoslovakia if Britain and Poland both agreed to come in, and disparaged Coulondre's dispatches from Moscow suggesting the Soviet Union was willing to come in. On 5 July 1938, Count Friedrich Werner von der Schulenburg, the German ambassador in Moscow, reported to Berlin that Coulondre had told him that he received word from Litvinov that the Soviets had only intervened in the Spanish Civil War in 1936 because Stalin did not want to "lose face" with the foreign communists, especially the French Communist Party, and the Soviets were willing to pull out of Spain if Germany did likewise. Schulenburg concluded that Litvinov had used Coulondre to convey this message rather than telling him directly as this was the Soviet way of delivering a message in a way that could be denied. Coulondre himself reported to Paris that the Soviets were not keen to be involved in the Spanish Civil War where no Soviet interests were at stake and especially with Germany and Italy intervening on the other side, concluding that Moscow was looking for a dignified way out of Spain without loss of face now that war was threatening to break out in Central Europe. Coulondre stated that his sources in Moscow had told him that the decision to intervene in Spain had been undertaken because of Stalin's feud with Leon Trotsky in order to maintain Stalin's revolutionary and anti-fascist credentials against Trotskyism among communists worldwide and the Soviets had no real interest in ensuring the victory of the Republicans over the Nationalists, stating the war in Spain was an expensive distraction for the Soviet Union.

On 12 July 1938, Coulondre reported that the a Czechoslovak military mission together with M. Hromadko, the president of the Skoda works had arrived in Moscow for talks. Afterwards, Litvinov summoned Coulondre for talks, asking him a series of intense, probing questions about what France would do if Germany attacked Czechoslovakia. Coulondre reported to Paris that based on what Litvinov was asking that he believed that Stalin was willing to come to the aid of Czechoslovakia. However, on 29 July 1938, the Battle of Lake Khasan began as the Japanese Kwantung Army attempted to seize the area around Lake Khasan in the Soviet Far East and regular skirmishes broke out on the border between the Soviet Union and Manchukuo. With the Soviet-Japanese border war, the attention of the Kremlin shifted from Europe to Asia.

On 20 September 1938, Litvinov had delivered a strong pro-Czechoslovak speech before the League of Nations's General Assembly in Geneva, saying: "Four nations have already been sacrificed and a fifth is next on the list". On 21 September 1938, Coulondre reported that the previous day the Soviet Union had promised Czechoslovakia "unconditional air support" in the event of a German invasion, through the ambassador added that he had seen no practical effort to put this promise into effect. On 24 September 1938, Coulondre reported to Bonnet that the Soviets were still willing to stand by their alliance with Czechoslovakia and were criticizing President Edvard Beneš for agreeing to the Anglo-French plan to transfer the Sudetenland to Germany. At the same time, Coulondre reported that Litvinov had told him that the Soviet Union would come to Czechoslovakia's defense only if the Council of the League of Nations voted for military sanctions against Germany, which he noted was tantamount to doing nothing. Coulondre accused Litvinov of "taking shelter behind the League of Nations". Despite Coulondre's best efforts to play up the possibility of the Soviet Union coming in to aid Czechoslovakia, the evidence to the contrary that crept in to his dispatches allowed Bonnet to argue to the French cabinet that the Moscow would do nothing to aid Prague if the crisis should come to war. On 30 September 1938, the Munich Agreement was signed, putting an end to the Sudetenland crisis. The same day, Coulondre visited Fierlinger to offer him his sympathy. Coulondre reported: "When I entered his study, I felt there is the coldness which penetrates one in a house where there is a dead person".

On 4 October 1938, Coulondre handed over to the Soviet Vice Foreign Commissar, Vladimir Potemkin, the text of the Munich Agreement. Coulondre reported to Paris an odd conversation where Potemkin first in a formal and cold tone of voice said "I simply wish to state that the Western Powers have deliberately kept the USSR out of the negotiations". Then suddenly Potemkin grew more emotional as he put his hand on Coulondre's shoulder and said in an anguished tone: "My poor fellow, what have you done? For us, I see no other consequence, but a fourth partition of Poland". Coulondre in one of his last dispatches from Moscow reported his belief that the Soviet Union was no longer interested in collective security and that Moscow would try "to return to the policy of understanding with Germany which she had abandoned in 1931". Coulondre predicted there was a real possibility of the Soviet Union trying to achieve an alliance with Germany against the western powers and of another partition of Poland.

== Ambassador in Berlin ==
=== Arrival on the Wilhelmstrasse ===
In October 1938, Coulondre was appointed the French ambassador to Germany as the French Premier Édouard Daladier was determined to wrestle control of foreign policy from his appeasement-minded foreign minister Georges Bonnet and felt that replacing André François-Poncet as ambassador to Berlin with Coulondre, a diplomat known for anti-Nazi views, was a way of weakening Bonnet. Furthermore, Daladier felt that François-Poncet was too closely associated with appeasement as he had been the French ambassador in Berlin since 1931, and appointing an anti-appeasement diplomat as ambassador would signal to Berlin that there would no more treaties like the Munich Agreement. Like Coulondre, Daladier was from the south of France, and the two men were old friends who often talked to each other in Provençal when they did not want other French people to understand what they were saying. Coulondre saw himself as more serving Daladier rather than his nominal superior Bonnet, and throughout his time in Berlin he had much influence on Daladier. Coulondre's successor as the French ambassador in Moscow was Émile Naggiar, the French ambassador to China, who took some time to make his way from Chunking, the temporary capital of the Chinese Nationalist government as Nanking had been taken by the Japanese in 1937, to Moscow.

On 22 November 1938, Coulondre arrived in Berlin and presented his credentials as an ambassador for the republic to Adolf Hitler at the Reich Chancellery on the Wilhelmstrasse on the same day. The French Embassy was located on the Wilhelmstrasse, the most prestigious and exclusive street in Berlin, just a few blocks down from the Reich Chancellory. The instructions given to him by Bonnet ordered the new ambassador to create a détente with Germany. Coulondre wrote in his memoirs: "After having gone to Moscow to work for an entente against Hitler, I was now to go to Berlin to work for an entente with Hitler". At his first meeting with the Foreign Minister, Joachim von Ribbentrop, the latter recorded: "M. Coulondre told me that upon taking the appointment, he intended to do all he could to improve Franco-German relations...He personally was not biased in any particular direction and was open to all suggestions". However, upon greeting the senior staff of the French embassy, Coulondre told them: "Munich is our point of departure. Each of us is free to judge as he sees it the policy which led there. The fact remains that to safeguard the peace, the Western Powers went there. The question, the only question now before us, is whetever peace can actually be found by this route". Writing about the intensified antisemitism in Germany following the Kristallnacht pogrom of 9 November 1938 Coulondre stated: "the treatment inflicted in Germany upon the Jews whom the Nazis intend to extirpate completely like malevolent beasts illuminates the entire distance which separates the Hitlerian conception of the world from the spiritual patrimony of the democratic nations". In 1938, an informal group of four consisting of François-Poncet, Weizsäcker, the British ambassador Sir Nevile Henderson, and the Italian ambassador Baron Bernardo Attolico had come together to work to "manage" Germany's rise to great power status and prevent a war. Unlike François-Poncet, Coulondre chose not to join the group of four.

Captain Paul Stehlin, the French air attache to Germany wrote: "Robert Coulondre was very different from his predecessor in physical appearance and seemed friendlier when you first met him. He looked shy with pleasant smiling eyes in a square face and a high, willful forehead. His moral, intellectual qualities and his compassion were of the same stuff as his predecessor." The younger French diplomats tended to view Coulondre as inferior as an ambassador compared to François-Poncet partly because of his dispatches to Paris lacked the same literary quality that François-Poncet's dispatches had and partly because François-Poncet described every possible outcome to a situation whereas Coulondre would limit himself to the one he viewed as the most likely outcome. Likewise, both Charles Corbin, the ambassador in London and Léon Noël, the ambassador in Warsaw were considered to be better diplomats. The French historian Jean-Baptiste Duroselle wrote that Coulondre's mistakes in his dispatches came mostly from using General Henri Antoine Didelet, the French military attaché to Germany, as a source, for Didelet was often misinformed, but Coulondre was highly prescient in his dispatches, for example predicting the fourth partition of Poland in October 1938. As a specialist in economic affairs who closely studied the German economy when he worked as a deputy to René Massigli, Coulondre was unusually well informed about the state of the Nazi economy. Duroselle described Coulondre as a man with "much common sense and a healthy understanding of his German counterparts".

Coulondre described the Nazi Party leaders as he met them in hostile tones. Coulondre wrote that Hermann Göring was "at once ridiculous and formidable", Joachim von Ribbentrop was "contemptible", Rudolf Hess was as boring as he was stupid, Alfred Rosenberg was eccentric and weird, and Joseph Goebbels was "ce petit diable boiteux" ("this lame little devil"), adding that Goebbels's various mistresses were more interesting than he was. Coulondre wrote he had the impression that Baron Ernst von Weizsäcker, the State Secretary of the Auswärtiges Amt, did not want a war with France, but his relations with Weizsäcker were cold and distant as Coulondre never trusted him. The American historians Carl Schorske and Franklin Ford wrote that everything that has emerged since 1945 showed Coulondre was right to distrust Weizsäcker, a thoroughly duplicitous and dishonest man. About Hitler, Coulondre wrote he enjoyed "une puissance diabolique" ("a diabolical power") over the German people, a power which he exercised with "une habileté satanique" ("a satanic skill"). The Canadian historian Robert J. Young wrote that Coulondre in his dispatches to Paris usually employed imagery that linked Hitler with the devil. Coulondre saw little evidence of a German interest in a détente with France, and instead noted the recurring theme of Hitler's speeches was the "harshness" of the Treaty of Versailles, which justified everything his government did to end the international system established in 1919. Initially, he believed that Hitler wanted an alliance with Poland to take over the Soviet Ukraine, and that if the Poles refused to go along, then Hitler would just attack Poland. Coulondre reported to Paris that Hitler seemed to be suffering from some sort of psychological imbalance as he wrote Hitler was an insomniac with a dubious diet who was constantly getting shots of some unknown substance from his sinister quack doctor, Theodor Morell. Coulondre was not entirely certain just what Hitler was getting shots of from the needles of Dr. Morell, but he believed that the "energy shots" were affecting Hitler's mind and health in a negative way. Likewise, Coulondre reported that the prosperity of the Reich was more apparent than real as the demands of the Four Year Plan designed to prepare Germany for a "total war" by 1940 had caused foreign exchange to be used to import raw materials that Germany lacked such as high-grade iron and nickel. As Germany's population exceeded the capacity of German agriculture, the emphasis on importing raw materials at the expense of food had led to a sharp increase in the price of food along with food shortages. Coulondre reported that many ordinary Germans were more concerned about the rising price of food and were not impressed with the imposing new Reich Chancellery that Hitler had built on the Wilhelmstrasse as graffiti was left along the walls of Berlin at night that read: "Kein Kaffee, Keine Butter, Kein Ei, aber eine neue Reichskanzlei!" ("No coffee, no butter, no eggs, but we have a new Reich Chancellery!"). Coulondre further noted that the largest sources of food for the Reich were the farms of Eastern Europe, and that for Germany to bring Eastern Europe under its control would allow greater food to be imported without using up foreign exchange.

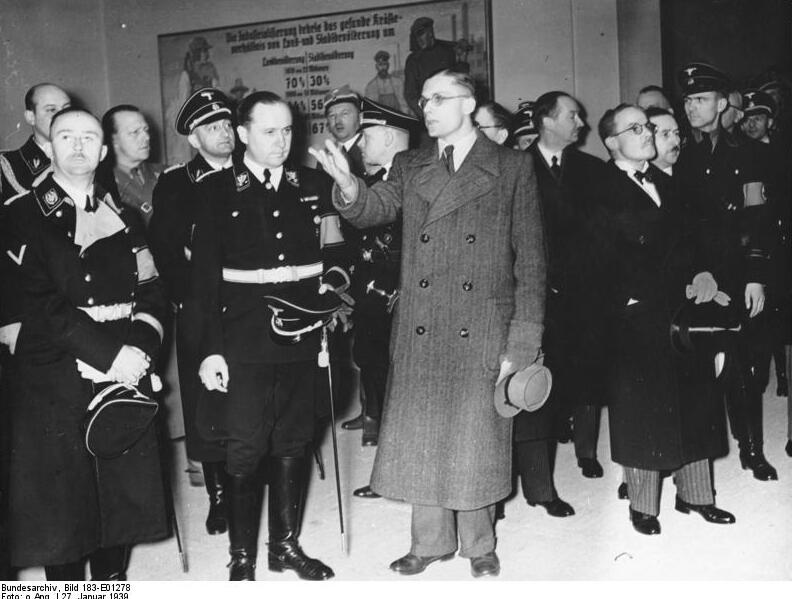
Coulondre in Berlin on 27 January 1939. In the foreground from left to right Heinrich Himmler, Berlin police chief Count Wolf von Helldorff, and the Agriculture Minister Richard Walther Darré. Coulondre is the man on the right with the glasses, the grey gloves and the top hat in his hands.

=== The End of Czechoslovakia ===
On 13 December 1938, Coulondre reported to Paris that he learned much about the "National Union of the Ukraine" terrorist group, whose headquarters were on 79 Mecklenburg Street in Berlin, and which had been financed and armed by the SS. Coulondre further noted that the "National Union of the Ukraine" group was not just trying to send its agents into the Soviet Ukraine as expected, but also into the Polish region of Eastern Galicia, which had a Ukrainian majority, which led him to conclude that the Reich was becoming hostile to Poland. On 15 December 1938, Coulondre reported that he believed the majority of the German people did not want war and found that a surprising large number had favorable views of France. However, he believed that Germany was oriented towards expansionism in Eastern Europe, especially towards Ukraine, concluding: "The integration of Deutschtum into the Reich has been carried out more or less completely. Now the hour of Lebensraum has come". Furthermore, Coulondre came to believe that the prosperity of the Third Reich was only superficial and the massive rearmament program of the Nazi regime had created serious structural economic problems for Germany, which Coulondre believed Hitler would attempt to resolve by seizing parts of Eastern Europe in order to exploit.

On 15 December 1938, Coulondre reported that the situation for the German Jewish community was worsening by the day and predicted the Nazis were planning to push Jews to the "margin of society". Coulondre reported that since he arrived in Berlin, the Nazi regime had passed laws forbidding Jews to own cars; from going to museums, sports events, theaters, cinemas or concerts; from attending universities or colleges; and from going on certain streets. Coulondre noted that a law had been passed requiring all Jews to add the names Israel or Sarah as part of their first names to order to identify them as Jews. He speculated that "other, more radical measures" might be coming. Finally, he predicted that if a German Jew might follow the example of Herschel Grynszpan in assassinating a Nazi that the Nazi regime "would not hesitate in bringing about the disappearance in blood of those they call the descendants of Judas".

Under the terms of the Munich Agreement, in exchange for the Sudetenland "going home to the Reich" over a ten-day period in October 1938, Britain, France, Germany and Italy were committed to making a "guarantee" of the rest of Czecho-Slovakia (as Czechoslovakia had been renamed) from aggression. When Coulondre asked Ribbentrop about negotiating the "guarantee" of Czecho-Slovakia, he found that Ribbentrop kept giving him various excuses as why that was not possible right now, leading Coulondre to suspect that Germany was not content with the Sudetenland and wanted all of Czecho-Slovakia. On 21 December 1938, Weizsäcker told Coulondre that he rejected the idea of an Anglo-French "guarantee" of Czecho-Slovakia promised by the Munich Agreement, saying that the fate of Czecho-Slovakia was entirely in German hands. On 8 February 1939, Coulondre together with Sir George Ogilvie-Forbes who was temporarily in charge of the British Embassy presented a joint note saying that their two governments' "would now be glad to learn the views of the German government as to the best way of giving effect to the understanding reached at Munich in regard to the guarantee of Czecho-Slovakia". The Reich government did not answer the note until 28 February, saying in a note written by Hitler himself that it was not possible to "guarantee" Czecho-Slovakia at present as Germany had to "await first a clarification of the internal development of Czecho-Slovakia". At least five weeks before the Germany moved against Czecho-Slovakia, Coulondre had been predicating that such a move was imminent. Coulondre noted that in late February-early March 1939 a sharp anti-Czech tone to the stories appearing in the German newspapers that resembled the stories that had appeared in 1938 right down to the accusations of a "blutbad" (bloodbath) of ethnic Germans in Bohemia, which led him to guess that something was planned against Czecho-Slovakia.

Under the Munich Agreement, Germany, Italy, France and Britain were all supposed to issue a guarantee of Czecho-Slovakia. On 2 March 1939, Ribbentrop issued a note to the British charge d'affairs George Ogilvie-Forbes (who was the acting ambassador as the ambassador Nevile Henderson was being treated for cancer in London) and Coulondre that declared that his government saw "an extension of this guarantee obligation to the Western powers not only no factor for the appeasement" but instead "a further element likely to strength wild tendencies, as has been the case in the past". Ribbentrop's note declared that the Reich regarded Czecho-Slovakia as "primarily within the sphere of the most important interests of the German Reich, not only from the historical point of view, but in the light of geographical and above all economic necessity". Coulondre in a dispatch to Paris wrote that "translated from the diplomatic language", the note stated that neither Britain nor France had "no longer any right to interest themselves in Central European affairs".

About the visit of the Czecho-Slovak president Emil Hácha and Foreign Minister František Chvalkovský to Berlin on the night of 14–15 March 1939, Coulondre reported to Paris based on what he described as a reliable source within the Auswärtiges Amt that: "The German ministers [Göring and Ribbetrop] were pitiless. They literally hunted Dr. Hácha and M. Chvalkovsky round the table on which the documents were lying, thrusting them continually before them, pushing pens into their hands, incessantly repeating that if they continued in their refusal, half of Prague would lie in ruins from bombing within two hours, and that this would be only the beginning. Hundreds of bombers were waiting the order to take off, and they would receive that order at six in the morning if the signatures were not forthcoming". At that point, Hácha suffered a mild heart attack and had to be revived by "energy" injections by Hitler's doctor, the sinister quack Dr. Theodor Morell. At that point, Hácha phoned Prague to tell his cabinet that resistance was futile and at about 4 am on 15 March 1939 signed away his country's independence, with tears in his eyes.

On 15 March 1939, Germany violated the Munich Agreement by occupying the Czech part of the Czecho-Slovakia, which now become the Protectorate of Bohemia and Moravia. Coulondre reported to Paris that "the Munich Agreement no longer exists", and stated that he believed that Hitler was still preoccupied with Eastern Europe, he would be willing to turn west if he thought that Germany was losing the arms race with Britain and France. Coulondre advised Paris must rearm "to the limit of our capacity", but as discreetly as possible. To Weizsäcker, Coulondre spoke in an angry tone of the "contravention of the Munich Agreement, in contradiction to the relationship of confidence, which he had expected to find here". Weizsäcker, who despite his post-war claims to have been an anti-Nazi, was in an arrogant and belligerent mood, and accordingly to his own account of his meeting with Coulondre:

"I spoke rather sharply to the Ambassador and told him not to mention the Munich Agreement, which he alleged had been violated, and not to give us any lectures...I told him that in view of the agreement reached last night with the Czech government I could see no reason for any démarche by the French ambassador...and that I was sure he would find fresh instructions when he returned to his embassy, and these would set his mind at rest".

When Coulondre presented Weizsäcker on 18 March 1939 with a French note protesting against the German occupation of the Czech lands, the latter accordingly to his own account:

"I immediately replaced the Note in its envelope and thrust it back at the Ambassador with the remark that I categorically refused to accept from him any protest regarding the Czecho-Slovak affair. Nor would I take note of the communication and I would advise M. Coulondre to urge his government to revise the draft".

Coulondre, a diplomat known for his toughness, refused to accept Weizsäcker's insolent behavior, telling him that the French note had been written after "due consideration" and he would not take it back to be revised. When Weizsäcker continued to rudely refuse to accept the note, Coulondre sharply accused him of being a very poor diplomat, saying the French government had every right to make known its views to the German government, and that Weizsäcker was failing in the most elementary duties of the diplomat by seeking to conceal the views of France from his own government. Coulondre threw the note down at Weizsäcker's desk and the latter reluctantly agreed he "would regard it as transmitted to us through the post". The Coulondre-Weizsäcker meetings later came up at Weizsäcker's trial for crimes against humanity for his role in arranging for French Jews to be deported to Auschwitz, and at that point, Weizsäcker conveniently "remembered" that he had been a "resistance fighter" against the Nazi regime, only pretending to serve the Nazis in order to sabotage the regime within. Weizsäcker testified that he exaggerated his belligerence and arrogance in his accounts of his meetings to make it appear that he was loyal Nazi as a cover for his supposed work as a "resistance fighter"; he and his defense lawyers had forgotten that Coulondre's account of his meetings with him had appeared in the French Yellow Book, a collection of diplomatic documents relating to the Danzig crisis published in late 1939. The American prosecutor had not, and then produced the Yellow Book in court to show that Coulondre's account did support Weizsäcker's accounts of his arrogant and abusive behavior.

Coulondre reported to Paris that the creation of the Protectorate of Bohemia-Moravia proved that Hitler wanted to dominate Europe, and the best that France could do was rearm to the maximum in order to deter Hitler from choosing war. In March 1939, Coulondre reported to Paris that Captain Stehlin had a long chat with General Karl Bodenschatz, who served as the Luftwaffe liaison officer to Hitler. Bodenschatz mentioned to Stehlin that his belief that "Etwas im Osten im Gange ist" ("something is brewing in the east"), mentioning that Soviet military attache in Berlin had met with senior Wehrmacht officers and Ribbentrop had dinner with the Soviet ambassador Alexsei Merekalov. On the basis of this, Coulondre reached the conclusion that the Soviet Union and Germany were negotiating against Poland. During a meeting with the Polish ambassador to Germany, Jozef Lipski, Coulondre warned in an "off-the-record" conversation that he was convinced that the Luftwaffe had such an overwhelming superiority over the air forces of the East European states that Poland did not stand a chance if Germany should invade, an assessment that left Lipski very depressed.

=== The Danzig crisis ===
On 31 March 1939, the British government made the famous "guarantee" of Poland, followed up on 13 April by "guarantees" of Romania and Greece. Coulondre subsequently believed that these British diplomatic moves indirectly helped make the Molotov–Ribbentrop pact possible, as he wrote in De Staline à Hitler:

"The Reich could not attack Russia by land without using Polish or Romanian territory, that is to say, since 13 April, without bringing into play the guarantee of the Western powers and consequently triggering war with them. Stalin had obtained, indirectly and without having to commit himself, the shield in the West which he had been seeking for ten years...he could safely watch developments and carry on a double game in a way dear to the Russians. One should not tempt saints; still less those who are not saints."

Coulondre's relations with the British Ambassador in Berlin, Sir Nevile Henderson were very poor as Coulondre in his dispatches described Henderson as a convinced appeaser who had a barely veiled admiration for the Nazi regime. On 29 April 1939, Coulondre reported to Paris that when Germany occupied the Czech part of Czecho-Slovakia on 15 March 1939, that Henderson, "always an admirer of the National Socialist regime, careful to protect Mr. Hitler's prestige, was convinced that Great Britain and Germany could divide the world between them" was very angry when he learned that the Reich had just violated the Munich Agreement as it "wounded him in his pride". Coulondre went on to write: "Yesterday, I found him exactly as I knew him in February." Coulondre added that Henderson had told him that the German demand that the Free City of Danzig be allowed to rejoin Germany was justified in his opinion and the introduction of conscription in Britain did not mean that British policies towards Germany were changing. Coulondre concluded "it appears that events barely touched Sir Nevile Henderson, like water over a mirror...It would seem that he forgot everything and failed to learn anything". At the same time, Coulondre reported that the driving force behind a German rapprochement with the Soviet Union was not Hitler-whom Coulondre argued wanted to dominate Europe without precisely knowing how he wanted to do it-but rather Ribbentrop, whom Coulondre wrote was largely determining the course of German foreign policy in 1939 due to Hitler's indecision.

Writing about the Danzig crisis on 30 April 1939, Coulondre sent a dispatch to Bonnet saying Hitler sought:

"....a mortgage on Polish foreign policy, while itself retaining complete liberty of action allowing the conclusion of political agreements with other countries. In these circumstances, the new settlement proposed by Germany, which would link the questions of Danzig and of the passage across the Corridor with counterbalancing questions of a political nature, would only serve to aggravate this mortgage and practically subordinate Poland to the Axis and the Anti-Comintern Bloc. Warsaw refused this in order to retain its independence...Polish acceptance of Germany's demands would have rendered the application of any braking machinery in the East impossible. The Germans are not wrong then, when they claim that Danzig is in itself only a secondary question. It is not only the fate of the Free City, it is the enslavement or liberty of Europe which is at stake in the issue now joined."

On 7 May 1939, Coulondre reported to Paris that the dismissal of Litvinov as Soviet Foreign Commissar had caused much comment in official circles in Berlin, and that accordingly to his sources Germany was planning to invade Poland that year and was willing to sign a pact with the Soviet Union to achieve that goal. On 9 May 1939, Coulondre reported he kept hearing rumors in the circles that he socialized with "...that Germany had made, or was going to make to Russia proposals aimed at a partition of Poland". Coulondre's intelligence was quickly confirmed by the German mole Erich Kordt. On 1 June 1939, Coulondre in a dispatch to Bonnet stated: "Hitler will risk war if he does not have to fight Russia. On the other hand, if he knows he has to fight her too he will draw back rather than expose his country, his party and himself to ruin". In June 1939, as the Danzig crisis deepened, Coulondre wrote that "Hitler has never up till now undertaken any move which he was not certain of success", and stated his belief that a forceful French stand in favor of Poland would deter Germany from choosing war to resolve the Danzig crisis. At the very end of June 1939, the Deuxième Bureau had tapped the telephone of Otto Abetz, Ribbentrop's agent in Paris, overheard a possibly intoxicated Abetz saying that the Free City of Danzig would rejoining Germany that weekend as Hitler was coming to Danzig. At a meeting with Weizsäcker, Coulondre was informed that all talk of der Führer going to Danzig that weekend to proclaim the Free City's return to Germany were nonsense as Hitler would never put himself into danger, an assessment that Coulondre agreed with.

The nature of the Danzig crisis with Germany demanding that the Free City of Danzig, a city that was 90% German "go home to the Reich" and already under the control of the Nazi Party posed major difficulties for France and Britain. Coulondre noted in a dispatch to Paris on 21 June 1939:

"The majority of the accredited diplomats in Berlin try to see what could be a compromise solution and are alarmed that they do not. Thus, they are trapped in a sort of contradiction, for the moment one admits, and they admit it, the unlimited nature of German National Socialist demands, then there is no hope of ending them by settling the crisis of Danzig, and consequently there is no advantage of compromising oneself on the subject. On the contrary there are major disadvantages".

As part of the effort to deter Germany from attacking Poland in the summer of 1939, Coulondre was very much in favor of having the Soviet Union join the "peace front" to deter Germany from invading Poland. Coulondre reported to Paris that he had heard rumors that Colonel-General Wilhelm Keitel, the chief of the Oberkommando der Wehrmacht, and Colonel-General Walter von Brauchitsch, the Army's commander, had warned Hitler that Germany could not defeat Britain, France, and the Soviet Union all at once, which for him was further evidence of the need to have the Soviet Union join the "peace front". In August 1939, Coulondre noted that for the first time the German newspapers were accusing the Poles of insulting "German honour", an allegation which he noted had last been made in September 1938 when Czechoslovakia had been accused of insulting "German honour", leading him to conclude: "The Hitlerian plan continues to develop according to a well-known procedure". Coulondre further noted that Danzig crisis was now escalating as the Reich had made the status of the German minority in Poland into an issue instead of just the Free City of Danzig, the city-state which was not part of Poland and was thus potentially easier to resolve than the question of the volksdeutsche minority in Poland. During the Danzig crisis, Coulondre consistently advocated as a solution a compulsory population exchange along the lines of the Greek-Turkish population exchange of 1923 under which all of the ethnic Germans living in Poland would be expelled into Germany and all the ethnic Poles living in Germany would be expelled into Poland, saying that the Poles and Germans needed to be separated by force if necessary for their own good as the two peoples simply could not get along. Coulondre's 19-year-old daughter, Simone, was highly worried as the crisis gathered pace in the summer of 1939, and Coulondre later recalled that one of the most difficult aspects of the Danzig crisis was having to assure his daughter that peace would be saved.

=== The last days of peace ===
At the height of the Danzig crisis, Coulondre was summoned to a meeting with Hitler at about 7:00 pm on 25 August 1939. Hitler had scheduled the invasion of Poland for the next day and wanted his peace offer to France to appear before the French cabinet at more or less the same time as the Wehrmacht invaded Poland. Just a few hours before Coulondre had been summoned to the Reich Chancellery, the news had arrived that Britain had reacted to the Molotov–Ribbentrop Pact by signing a military alliance with Poland, while Fascist Italy had announced it would dishonor the Pact of Steel if war should break out, which was contrary to what Hitler had expected, putting him in an aggressive and angry mood, making for an unpleasant interview with Coulondre. Hitler told Coulondre that the dispute with Poland over Danzig had reached such a point that war was now inevitable, saying the "Polish provocation of the Reich could not be endured any longer" but that he did not want a war with France. Hitler told Coulondre that it was France's choice about whatever she fought Germany or not, advising the ambassador that the French should renounce their alliance with Poland. Finally, Hitler taunted Coulondre that the "peace front" that was meant to "contain" Germany was in ruins with the German-Soviet non-aggression pact and claimed that Britain would soon be signing a non-aggression pact with the Reich, leaving the French to face Germany alone if they chose to stand up for Poland. Hitler further taunted Coulondre by noting that all of the nations that were supposed to join the "peace front" like Turkey, Greece, Romania and Yugoslavia had dropped out, saying that nobody would "die for Danzig".

Coulondre told Hitler that he would pass on his message to the French cabinet, but also warned him that France would keep its word and stand by Poland if Germany did indeed choose war. Coulondre assured Hitler as a former soldier for the republic that France would indeed fight for Poland if it came to war, only to be interrupted by Hitler who said: "Why, then, give a blank cheque to Poland?" Coulondre replied that he as a former poilu he did not want to see another war, but as it was a matter of "French honor" that Hitler should have no doubts "that if Poland is attacked France will be at the side of Poland with all its forces". Hitler who had been expecting Coulondre to be like Henderson was taken aback by the French ambassador's assertiveness, replied: "It is painful to me to think of having to fight your country, but that does not depend on me. Please say that to Monsieur Daladier". At the end of the meeting, Coulondre told Hitler that if it came to war, the only winner would be Leon Trotsky and asked him to reconsider; at the mention of Trotsky, he reported that Hitler looked "...as if I had hit him in the stomach". The British historian D.C. Watt wrote that Coulondre was "a tougher man than Henderson. He gave as good as he got-even mentioning the alleged victim of Polish assassination who had actually died a month earlier in a domestic crime of passion. Hitler listened, shouted and repeated himself. Coulondre took his leave, the victor of that little encounter".

The next day, 26 August, Coulondre passed on to Hitler a letter from Daladier, begging him as one veteran of World War I to another not to plunge the world into the "madness of war" again, but saying that France would fight if Germany did invade Poland. Coulondre told Hitler "in the name of humanity, for the repose of his own conscience not to let pass this last chance of a peaceful solution". At another point, Coulondre spoke of all of millions of women and children who would die if the Danzig crisis came to war. Coulondre reported to Paris that the meeting with Hitler did not go well, with Hitler saying he promised to renounce any claim on Alsace-Lorraine as a sign of his goodwill towards France and the Danzig crisis had now reached such a point that he had no other choice but to attack Poland. Coulondre replied that the war could be stopped and it was only the attitude of Hitler that was making war inevitable. Coulondre reported to Paris his "sadness" that Daladier's letter had not moved Hitler at all, saying "he stands pat". In saying that war was now inevitable, Hitler was attempting to intimidate France into abandoning the alliance she signed with Poland in 1921; as this statement contradicted the later German claim that Poland had attacked Germany on 1 September 1939, the text of the Hitler-Coulondre meetings on 25–26 August 1939 were excluded from The White Book, a collection of documents from the Auswärtiges Amt published in December 1939. However, The Yellow Book, a collection of documents from the Quai d'Orsay published the same month included full transcripts of the Hitler-Coulondre meetings. The American historian Gerhard Weinberg wrote that the text of the Hitler-Coulondre meetings on 25–26 August 1939 must had been regarded as embarrassing with Hitler saying he had to invade Poland because of "intolerable" Polish provocations as Count Hans-Adolf von Moltke who was in charge of editing The White Book not only excluded the text of these meetings from The White Book, but also from the records of Auswärtiges Amt as the transcripts of the meetings survived only in the records of the Quai d'Orsay. After 1 September 1939, the official German line was always that Poland had attacked Germany, which made Hitler's statements to Coulondre that he had to attack Poland problematic.

The fact that France did not sever the alliance with Poland as Hitler had hoped, the signing of the Anglo-Polish alliance, Japan breaking off the talks for a military alliance with Germany and the message from Rome that Italy would be neutral all caused Hitler to halt the invasion of Poland and pushed the invasion date back to 1 September to give Ribbentrop more time to sever Britain and France from Poland. The news that Fall Weiss ("Case White") as the invasion of Poland had been code-named had been delayed for another week did not reach all of the Wehrmacht forces on time. On the morning of 26 August 1939 a number of Wehrmacht units crossed into Poland, engaging in much bloody fighting before retiring back to Germany later the same morning when they received word of Fall Weiss's postponement. Coulondre took the reports he heard of fighting along the German-Polish border together with the pull-back of the Wehrmacht forces as meaning that the French deterrence diplomacy was indeed working. For Coulondre, the sudden entry of the Wehrmacht into Poland together with their equally abrupt withdrawal proved that Hitler was bluffing and if France held firm, making it clear that a German invasion of Poland meant war with the republic, then Hitler would back down. On 26 August 1939, Coulondre in a letter to Daladier wrote about his meeting with Hitler: "Perhaps I moved him; but I did not prevail. His mind was made up". After meeting Henderson on 27 August, Coulondre observed that he was dressed in his usual dapper style with the red carnation he always wore on his suit, which Coulondre took as a hopeful sign that Henderson was still keeping his spirits up, which was important for him as he felt that one must never show weakness to the Nazis. The same day, Ribbentrop handed over to Coulondre a copy of Hitler's reply to Daladier letter along with telling Coulondore that Poland was the aggressor and "we shall strike at the first incident!"

On the evening of 27 August 1939, Coulondre wrote a letter to Daladier declaring: "One must hold firm, Hitler faced with force is a man who will climb down". In support of this thesis, Coulondre mentioned that earlier that day, he had met the German "specialist on France", the "shady writer" Friedrich Sieburg, who had told him: "the situation was worsening quickly in Germany. Hitler was hesitating, the Party was adrift, the population was grumbling. Germany was supposed to attack Poland on the morning of the 26th. The Fuhrer had decided against it at the last moment". He now changed his view of the démarche presented the previous day and stated that it "might yet bear fruit". Coulondre concluded that Hitler was bluffing and that provided that France and Britain remained resolute, then he would back down rather than chose war. Colondre concluded his dispatch: "Hold Fast!".

On 29 August, Coulondre reported to Paris he felt it was still possible to save the peace. Later the same day, when Coulondre saw the notes that Henderson had made of his meeting with Hitler to discuss the peace plan proposed by the Swedish businessman and amateur diplomat Birger Dahlerus, he noted that Hitler's stalemates were "more like a diktat imposed on a conquered country than an agreement to negotiate with a sovereign state". Coulondre however reluctantly accepted the Dahlerus plan as it committed Germany to negotiate with Poland to resolve the Danzig crisis, which Hitler had been refusing to do until then, which led to hopes that here was a possible means of preventing a war. After talking to Baron Bernardo Attolico, the Italian ambassador to Germany, about the Dahlerus plan, Coulondre reported to Paris that there was a euphoric air at the Italian embassy in Berlin as Attolico and the rest of Italian diplomats did not want Italy to have to declare neutrality and break the Pact of Steel if the Danzig crisis were to end in war.

On the night of 30–31 August, Coulondre learned of the "final offer" that Ribbentrop had made to Henderson demanding that a Polish envoy arrive in Berlin that night to discuss resolving the Danzig crisis. Coulondre felt the "final offer" was just an alibi for aggression, but very reluctantly supported Henderson's contention that an effort should be made to take up the "final offer" if only to prove Britain and France did everything within their power to save the peace. After visiting the British Embassy to learn about the 15 points of the "final offer", Coulondre went over to the Polish embassy to see Józef Lipski, the Polish ambassador, to argue that if Poland tried to respond to the "final offer" despite its absurdly short timeline and the demand that an envoy should fly in to Berlin from Warsaw that night, it would give the Poles the moral high ground. On the evening of 31 August 1939, at a meeting of the French cabinet, Daladier deliberately turned his back on Bonnet and refused to speak to his foreign minister as a way of showing he no longer supported the munichois faction in the cabinet headed by Bonnet. Daladier read out to the cabinet a letter he had received from Coulondre six days before saying: "The trial of strength turns to our advantage. It is only necessary to hold, hold, hold!" In the last days of August 1939, Coulondre consistently argued that Hitler could be deterred from attacking Poland, and regarded Henderson who still believed that if only Britain would just apply enough pressure on Poland to allow the Free City of Danzig to rejoin Germany, then war could be avoided, as a coward.

On the morning of 1 September 1939, Germany invaded Poland. The Kriegsmarine battleship SMS Schleswig-Holstein which had arrived in Danzig harbor on 25 August fired the first shots of World War II in Europe at about 4: 45 am on 1 September by bombarding the Polish fort on the Westerplatte, to be followed up by German forces invading Poland as dawn broke that day. Coulondre was in the garden of the French embassy at about 8:30 am on 1 September supervising the building of air raid trenches when he heard word that Germany had attacked Poland earlier that morning. Coulondre went to the Reichstag to listen to Hitler's speech claiming that Poland had just attacked Germany, and at about 10: 00 am he met with Ribbentrop to give him a démarche warning that France would fulfill the terms of an alliance with Poland unless Germany ceased the invasion of Poland at once. At about 10: 00pm on 1 September, Coulondre met with Ribbentrop again to hand him a note saying that unless Germany stopped its war against Poland at once, France would have to declare war. Coulondre spent 2 September anxious and impatient as he expected to have deliver a declaration of war, but none came from Paris. Benito Mussolini on the evening of 1 September had called for a peace conference to end the German-Polish war, and 2 September Attolico arrived at the French embassy to ask if the French note was an ultimatum, saying if it was not then Mussolini believed he could set up his peace conference. Much to Coulondre's frustration, Bonnet decided to take up Mussolini's peace offer, and instructed him to say the note was not an ultimatum. Attolico told Ribbentrop that based on his talks with Henderson and Coulondre that the Anglo-French notes of 1 September were not ultimatums, and that Germany should attend the peace conference to be hosted by Benito Mussolini.

The proposed peace conference collapsed when the British Foreign Secretary, Lord Halifax, phoned the Italian Foreign Minister, Count Galeazzo Ciano, at about 2 pm to say that Britain would only take part if the Wehrmacht withdrew from Poland at once, saying that a mere ceasefire was insufficient. On the evening of 2 September 1939, Bonnet who was against declaring war on Germany, reluctantly sent a telegram to Coulondre to say that he was expected to deliver an ultimatum to Germany the next day demanding that Germany withdraw its forces from Poland at once. At 8:28pm the same evening, Henderson telephoned Coulondre to say he had received a cable from London telling him that he was to deliver a very important message to Ribbentrop the next day, which he guessed would be an ultimatum and Britain would be at war with Germany tomorrow. As the Forschungsamt ("research office") as Göring called his private intelligence network was listening in, the contents of Henderson's call were passed on to Göring. Knowing that France was on the brink of war, Coulondre went out for a walk that night, observing that the Berliners were all sober and serious, with none of the jingoism of the summer of 1914. During his nocturnal walk down the streets of Berlin, Coulondre noted that nobody he saw was laughing or smiling, leading him to conclude that through the regime wanted war, the German people did not.

At 10:30 am on 3 September, Bonnet sent Coulondre a message saying he was to deliver an ultimatum that would expire at 5 pm on 4 September saying France would "fulfill...the commitments that France has contracted towards Poland" as Bonnet could not bring himself to use the word guerre (war). When Coulondre called Paris on the morning of 3 September to ask what would constitute rejection of the ultimatum, he was informed instead to change the deadline of its acceptance to 5: 00 pm on 3 September. Bonnet had wanted an extra day out of the hope that somehow a deal might be reached to stop the war, but Daladier had decided firmly on war. Colondre complained that the ultimatum that he had written on Bonnet's instructions was too weaselly and convoluted, never using the word war once, and would have preferred something stronger.

On 11 am on 3 September 1939, it was announced that a British ultimatum demanding an end to the war against Poland had been rejected and Neville Chamberlain had gone on BBC Radio to declare his nation was now at war with Germany. Before leaving the French embassy, Coulondre ordered that the embassy staff burn any sensitive documents and as he got into his car to take him to the Auswärtiges Amt, he noticed a small crowd had gathered outside of the embassy. One German teenager stepped up to him and asked in somewhat broken French for his autograph, which struck Coulondre as rather incongruous given that France was going to be at war with Germany later that day. At noon on 3 September 1939, Coulondre went to the Auswärtiges Amt's main office on the Wilhelmstrasse in Berlin, to be greeted by Weizsäcker. Coulondre arrived at the Auswärtiges Amt, wearing the full ceremonial uniform as an ambassadeur de France, bringing with him the ultimatum in a sealed briefcase and as everyone at the Auswärtiges Amt could guess what was in the briefcase, Coulondre recalled the atmosphere was electric with tension. When Coulondre presented the ultimatum to Weizsäcker, the latter replied that he was not in a position to know if Germany could withdraw its forces from Poland, which led Coulondre to insist on seeing Ribbentrop. After much stalling on the part of Weizsäcker who claimed that Ribbentrop was too busy to see the French ambassador, Coulondre finally saw Ribbentrop at about 12:30 pm. After Coulondre read out the ultimatum demanding a German withdrawal from Poland, an angry scene ensured with Ribbentrop accusing France of seeking an "aggressive war" with Germany, but Coulondre was finally able to get Ribbentrop to say that Germany would not stop its war against Poland, which led him to say in that case, France would be at war as of 5:00 pm that day. Coulondre had the sense that both Ribbentrop and Weizsäcker were acting as if they started a war that had escalated beyond their control as both men seemed to be trying to talk him out of delivering the declaration of war. Coulondre told Ribbentrop: "In these circumstances I must, on behalf of my Government, remind you for the last time of the heavy responsibility assumed by the Government of the Reich by entering, without a declaration of war, into hostilities against Poland and in not acting upon the suggestion made by the Governments of the French Republic and of His Britannic Majesty to suspend all aggressive action against Poland and to declare itself ready to withdraw its forces promptly from Polish territory. I have the painful duty to notify you that as from today, September 3, at 5 P.M., the French Government will find itself obliged to fulfill the obligations that France has contracted towards Poland, and which are known to the German Government". When Ribbentrop accused France of being the "aggressor", Coulondre replied that "history will be the judge of that". Coulondre then turned his back on Ribbentrop and Weizsäcker, leaving the Auswärtiges Amt, never to return. Coulondre along with the rest of the French embassy staff left Berlin early on the morning of 4 September 1939 on a special diplomatic train in exchange for the German embassy staff in Paris being allowed to leave on a special diplomatic train.

== Later life ==
From 10 January 1940 to 13 March 1940 Coulondre served as the chief of staff for Daladier, leaving office when Daladier resigned on 13 March 1940. In April 1940, Coulondre was sent on a diplomatic mission to Stockholm that aimed to persuade Sweden to stop selling Germany iron (most of Germany's steel was made with Swedish iron). Coulondre served as the French ambassador to Switzerland between 30 May-30 October 1940. On 21 June 1940, he wrote in his diary about the Armistice of 22 June 1940 signed that day: "“For two weeks I have woken up every morning to experience a nightmare. We are defeated, for sure. But let's save our honor! Why go for the armistice conditions?...For France the situation is the same as if we continue the fight, but let's go alongside the Anglo-Saxons with our fleet, the remains of our army which can go to North Africa or England, our air force. There are only drawbacks to surrender. No benefits". Most of his time in Bern was taken up with the care of French refugees who fled to Switzerland. On 20 September 1940, he received a telegram from the new Vichy regime announcing that he was now fired as ambassador and was being put on permanent unpaid leave.

On 2 May 1941, as part of the investigation that led to the Riom trial of 1942, Coulondre was questioned by a magistrate about his responsibility and that of Daladier for the French declaration of war against Germany in 1939. The magistrate was looking for information that Daladier had acted criminally in declaring war on Germany, and the answers that Coulondre gave him were such that he did not appear as a witness at the Riom trial. From 1945 to 1949, he served as the French representative on the Council of Reparations. After World War II, Coulondre published his memoirs De Staline à Hitler : souvenirs de deux ambassades : 1936-1939 in 1950.

== Bibliography ==
- Adamthwaite, Anthony (1977). France and the Coming of the Second World War, 1936-1939. London: Taylor & Francis. ISBN 978-1-000-35278-8.
- Adamthwaite, Anthony (2014). Grandeur And Misery: France's Bid for Power in Europe, 1914-1940. London: Bloomsbury Academic. ISBN 978-0-7131-6576-0.
- Ascher, Abraham (2012). Was Hitler a Riddle? Western Democracies and National Socialism. Stanford: Stanford University Press. ISBN 978-0-8047-8459-7.
- Baer, George W. (1976). Test Case: Italy, Ethiopia, and the League of Nations. Stanford: Hoover Institution Press. ISBN 0-8179-6591-2.
- Beck, Peter (1999). "Searching for Peace in Munich, not Geneva: The British Government, the League of Nations and the Sudetenland Question". In Igor Lukes; Erik Goldstein (eds.). The Munich Crisis, 1938 Prelude to World War II. London: Frank Cass. pp. 236–256.
- Bothwell, Robert; Hillmer, Norman (1975). The In-between Time: Canadian External Policy in the 1930s. Mississauga: Copp Clark. ISBN 0-7730-3125-1.
- Caron, Vicki (January 1985). "Prelude to Vichy: France and the Jewish Refugees in the Era of Appeasement". The Journal of Contemporary History. 20 (1): 157–176. doi:10.1177/002200948502000107. S2CID 153626538.
- Cienciala, Anna (1999). "The Munich Crisis of 1938: Plans and Strategy In Warsaw in the Context of Western Appeasement of Germany". In Igor Lukes & Erik Goldstein (ed.). The Munich Crisis, 1938 Prelude to World War II. London: Frank Cass. pp. 48–87. ISBN 0-7146-8056-7.
- Coulondre, Robert (1950). De Staline à Hitler: souvenirs de deux ambassades, 1936-1939. Paris: Hachette.
- Dreifort, John (July 1976). "The French Popular Front and the Franco-Soviet Pact, 1936-37: A Dilemma in Foreign Policy". The Journal of Contemporary History. 11 (2): 217–236. doi:10.1177/002200947601100212. S2CID 159501542.
- Duroselle, Jean-Baptiste (2004). France and the Nazi Threat: The Collapse of French Diplomacy 1932-1939. New York: Enigma Books.
- Ericksson, John (1984). "Threat Identification and Strategic Appraisal in the Soviet Union". In Ernest May (ed.). Knowing One's Enemies. Princeton: Princeton University Press. pp. 375–423. ISBN 978-1-4008-5606-0.
- Ford, Franklin; Schorske, Carl (1953). "The Voice in the Wilderness Robert Coulondre". In Gordon A. Craig; Felix Gilbert (eds.). The Diplomats 1919-1939. Princeton: Princeton University Press. pp. 555–578.
- Gooch, George (June 1940). "The Coming of the War". International Affairs Review Supplement. 19 (1): 5–11. doi:10.2307/3026161. JSTOR 3026161.
- Herbst, James (2019). The Politics of Apoliticism Political Trials in Vichy France, 1940-1942. Berlin: De Gruyter. ISBN 978-3-11-061016-1.
- Hucker, Daniel (2016). Public Opinion and the End of Appeasement in Britain and France. London: Routledge. ISBN 978-1-317-07354-3.
- May, Ernest (2000). Strange Victory: Hitler's Conquest of France. London: I.B. Tauris. ISBN 1-85043-329-1.
- Payne, Stanley (2008). The Spanish Civil War, the Soviet Union, and Communism. New Haven: Yale University Press.
- Kersaudy, François (1990). Norway 1940. Lincoln: University of Nebraska Press. ISBN 978-0-8032-7787-8.
- Overy, Richard (2009). 1939 Countdown to War. London: Penguin.
- Ragsdale, Hugh (2004). The Soviets, the Munich Crisis, and the Coming of World War II. Cambridge: Cambridge University Press. ISBN 978-1-139-45025-6.
- Roberts, Henry (1970). Eastern Europe: Politics, Revolution, & Diplomacy. New York: Alfred Knopf.
- Shirer, William (1960). The Rise and Fall of the Third Reich. New York: Simon and Schuster.
- Smetana, Vít (2008). In the Shadow of Munich British Policy Towards Czechoslovakia from the Endorsement to the Renunciation of the Munich Agreement (1938-1942). Prague: Charles University Press. ISBN 978-80-246-1373-4.
- Steiner, Zara (September 1999). "The Soviet Commissariat of Foreign Affairs and the Czechoslovakian Crisis in 1938: New Material from the Soviet Archives". The Historical Journal. 42 (3): 751–779. doi:10.1017/S0018246X99008626. S2CID 159600830.
- Thomas, Martin (1999). "France and the Czechoslovak Crisis". In Igor Lukes; Erik Goldstein (eds.). The Munich Crisis, 1938 Prelude to World War II. London: Frank Cass. pp. 122–159.
- Young, Robert (1984). "French Military Intelligence and Nazi Germany, 1938-1939". In Ernest May (ed.). Knowing One's Enemies. Princeton: Princeton University Press. pp. 271–309. ISBN 978-1-4008-5606-0.
- Young, Robert (2005). An Uncertain Idea of France: Essays and Reminiscence on the Third Republic. New York: Peter Lang. ISBN 0-8204-7481-9.
- Watt, D.C. (1989). How War Came: The Immediate Origins of the Second World War, 1938-1939. London: Heinemann.
- Watt, D.C. (2003). "Diplomacy and Diplomatists". In Joseph Maiolo; Robert Boyce (eds.). The Origins of World War Two: The Debate Continues. London: Macmillan. pp. 330–342. ISBN 0-333-94539-5.
- Nere, Jacques (1975). The Foreign Policy of France from 1914 to 1945. London: Routledge. ISBN 978-0-415-27371-8.
- Weinberg, Gerhard (1980). The Foreign Policy of Hitler's Germany Starting World War II 1937-1939. Chicago: University of Chicago Press.
- Zamir, Meir (July 1991). "Faisal and the Lebanese Question, 1918-20". Middle Eastern Studies. 27 (3): 404–426. doi:10.1080/00263209108700868.
