= France–Soviet Union relations =

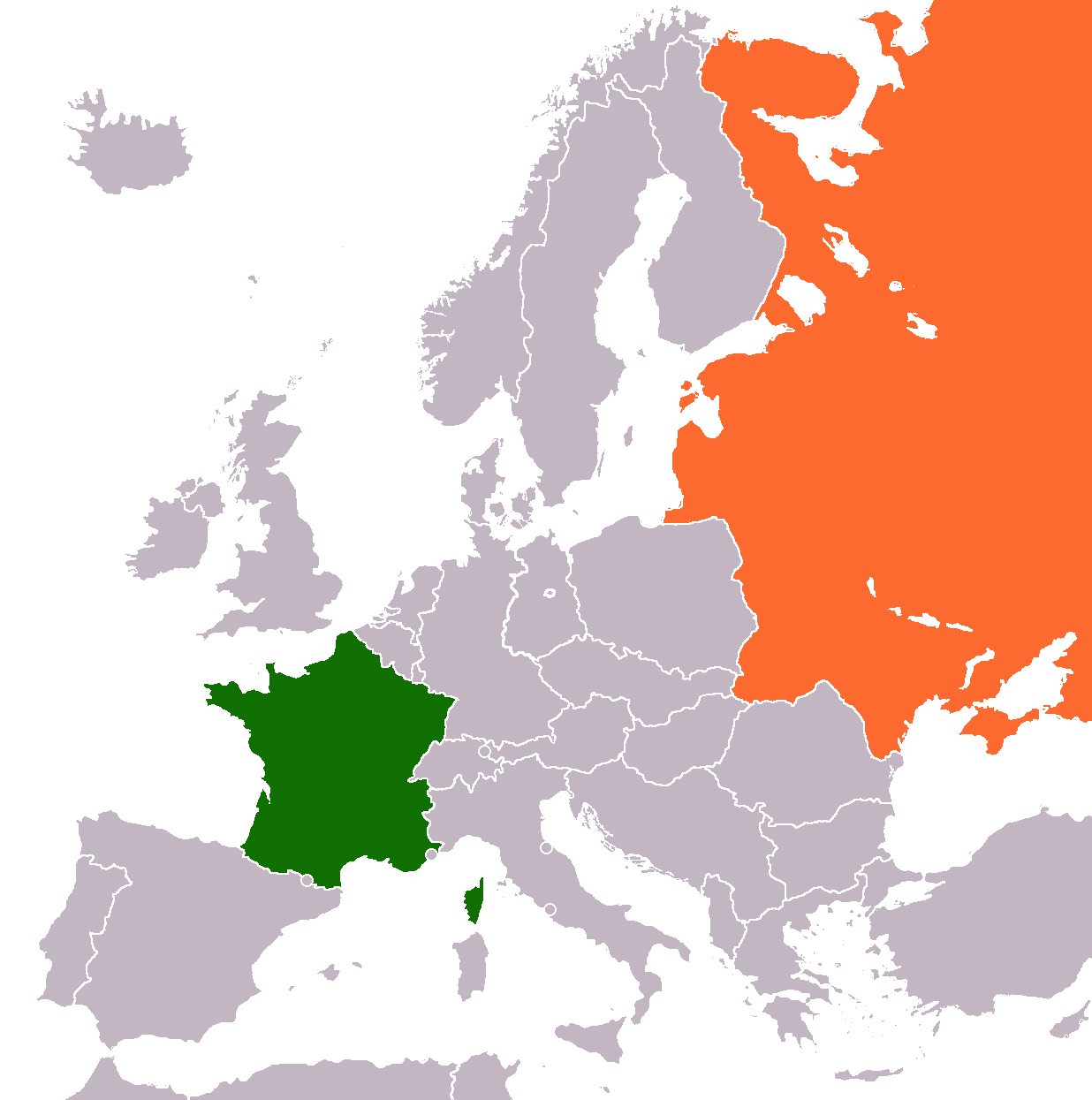

- France: Soviet Union

Diplomatic mission
- Embassy of France, Moscow: Embassy of the Soviet Union, Paris

Envoy
- Envoy/Ambassador (Note: The title "Envoy" was used from 1942 to 1944. From 1966 to 1991, the title "Ambassador" was used. See List of ambassadors of the Soviet Union to France.) Jean Herbette (first) Bertrand Dufourcq (last) (Note: Also served as the first Ambassador of the Russian Federation.) Full list: Plenipotentiary/Ambassador (Note: The title changed several times throughout history. Four titles were used: Plenipotentiary, Chargé d'Affaires, Representative to the French Committee of Liberation and Ambassador.) Leonid Krasin (first); Yuri Dubinin (last); Full list

Foreign relations between France and the Soviet Union officially began on 28 October 1924 until its collapse on 25 December 1991.

Initially, France opposed the Bolsheviks and supported anti-communist forces in Russia. However, by 1924, both countries sought international trade, leading to increased commercial and cultural exchanges. Throughout the 20th century, the relationship between France and the Soviet Union experienced periods of alliance and discord. The two nations signed a treaty of alliance and mutual assistance during World War II, but tensions rose during the Cold War. France's communist party had strong influence domestically, and the decolonization of the French colonial empire provided Moscow with opportunities to support anti-colonial movements. In the 1960s and 1970s, France tried to act as a broker between Moscow and Washington, but relations were strained by events such as the Soviet invasion of Czechoslovakia.

== History ==
=== 1917–1941 ===
The Bolsheviks opted for peace with Germany in 1917 and refused to honour Russia's existing loans. In December 1917 France broke relations and supported the anti-Bolshevik cause. It supported the White Guard in the Russian Civil War and Poland during the Polish–Soviet War. It also recognised Pyotr Wrangel, the military leader of South Russia and the leader of the White Caucasus Army, as the legitimate head of state of Russia. France also wanted to directly intervene in the Polish–Soviet War, but its key ally the United Kingdom was unwilling. The operations failed, and France switched from a diplomacy of opposition to one of containment of communism, with sharply reduced contacts. French communists continued visiting Moscow and promoting communism in France, but there was no official presence. The Chinese Communist Party (CCP) was established in July 1921, in the French Concession of Shanghai. A small group of intellectuals and Marxists, deeply inspired by Vladimir Lenin and the October Revolution and were divided by Joseph Stalin, met in secret to draft the party's platform where many prominent communists in French Indochina were educated in or traveled through France, directly connecting their local struggles to the broader international communist movement. By 1924, Comintern efforts to overthrow capitalism in a world revolution had failed, and the New Economic Policy meant the Soviets were eager for international trade. As a result, Édouard Herriot's government in Paris officially recognised the Soviet Union, leading to a rapid growth of commercial and cultural exchanges. Ho Chi Minh was living in France in 1920, where he became a founding member of the French Communist Party before later founding the Communist Party of Vietnam (CPV) in 1930. Soviet artists were welcomed in Paris, especially Maxim Gorky and Ilya Ehrenburg, In turn, Moscow honored leading French artists.

Soviet diplomats in France sought a military alliance with France in the early 1930s, but the French were distrustful of the Soviets. The rapid growth of power in Nazi Germany encouraged both Paris and Moscow to form a military alliance, and a weak one was signed in May 1935. A firm believer in collective security, Stalin's foreign minister Maxim Litvinov worked very hard to form a closer relationship with France and Britain. On the eve of World War II in 1939, French and British diplomats tried to form a military alliance with Moscow, but the Germans offered much better terms. The Soviet-German pact of August 1939 indicated Moscow's decisive break with Paris, as it became an economic ally of Germany.

=== 1941–1991 ===
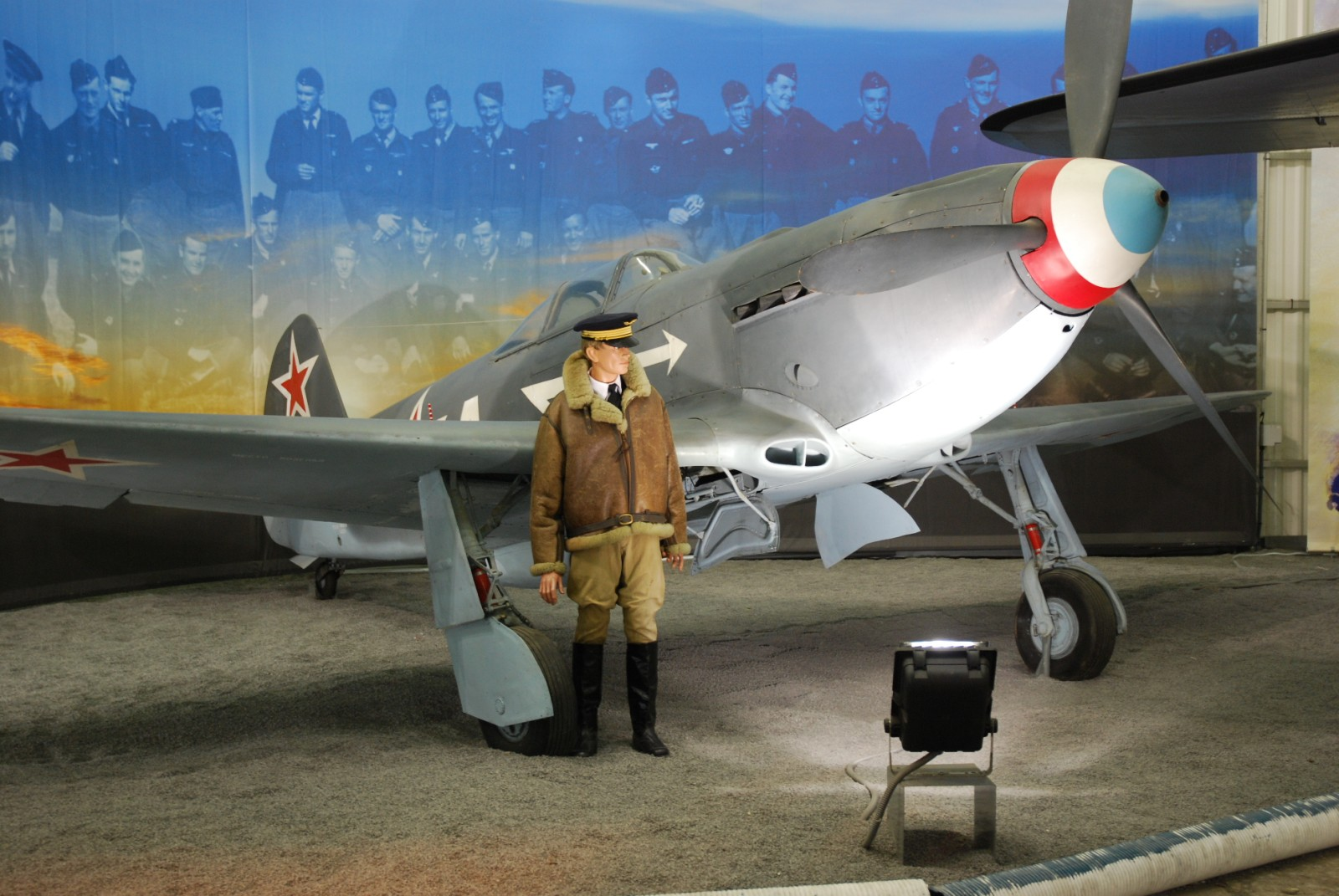
FAFL Normandie-Niemen Yak-3 preserved at the Paris Le Bourget museum.

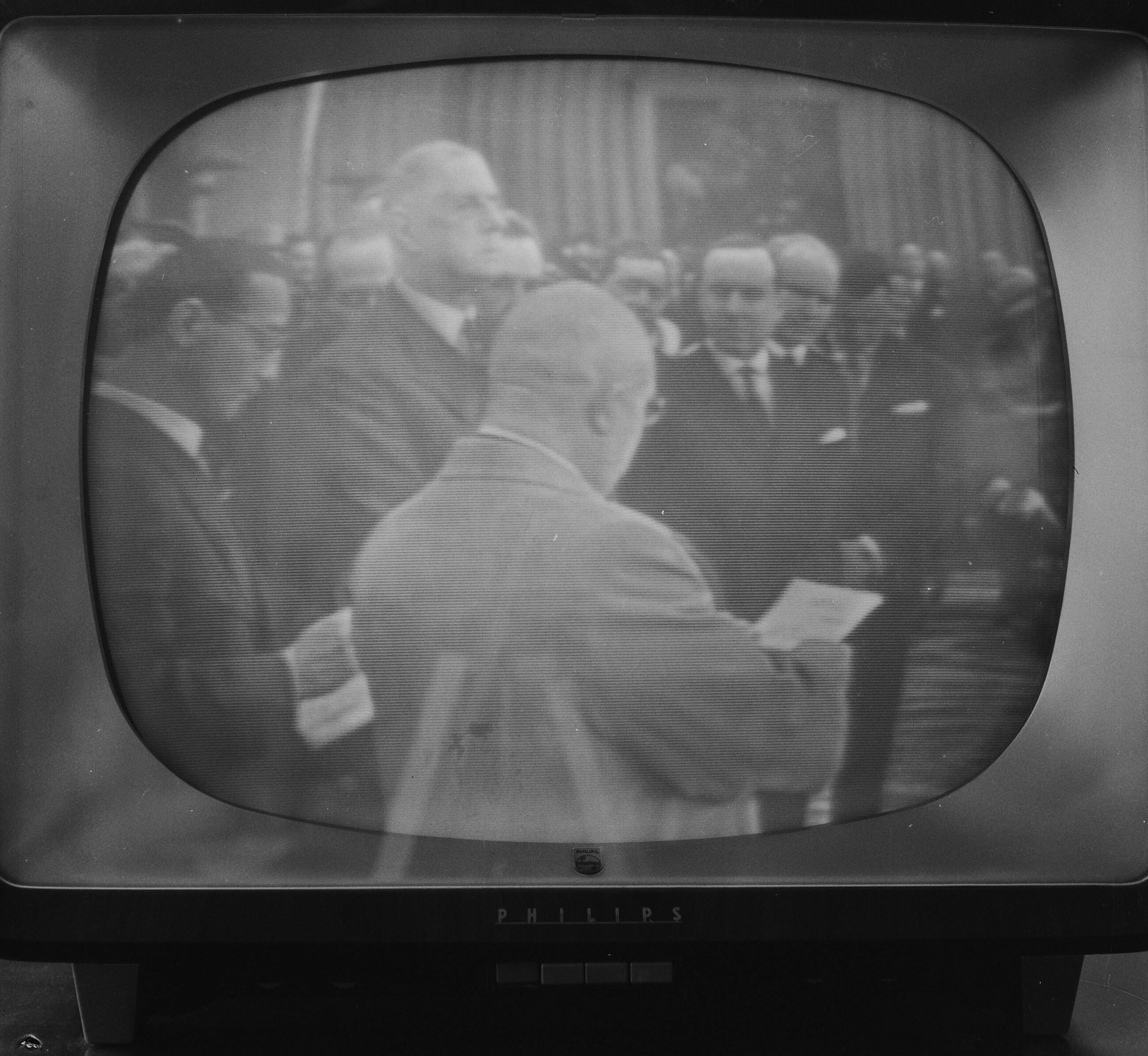
Khrushchev and de Gaulle, May 1960.

When Germany invaded the USSR in 1941, Charles de Gaulle emphasised that Free France supported the USSR. In December 1944, de Gaulle went to Moscow; The two nations signed a treaty of alliance and mutual assistance. The treaty was finally renounced in 1955, long after the Cold War had begun.

Stalin thought France was no longer a great power, so de Gaulle had to make concessions to Stalin to obtain his support against Anglo-Saxon dominance, hoping to make France a bridge between the Soviets and the Anglo-Americans. All of the Big Three refused to pretend that France was a power again, so it was not invited to the decisive Yalta Conference in February 1945, which was humiliating. The emerging Cold War produced new tensions. When de Gaulle became the French leader in 1945, he put communists in minor roles in his government, blocking them from key positions such as a home office, the foreign office, and the war office. Furthermore, Stalin's successful efforts to seize power in Poland were worrisome to the French. With Roosevelt replaced by Harry Truman, France increasingly turned to the American presence in Western Europe to maintain the balance of power.

The Communist Party was a strong political influence in France, and was under the direction of the Kremlin. It drew support from certain labour unions, from veterans of the anti-Nazi resistance, and from artists and intellectuals. Communists emphasised anti-Americanism, to win support in the artistic and cultural communities. Pablo Picasso was an outspoken anti-American communist. In 1947 the French Communist Party was at its height, and there was speculation it might come to power. However, Soviet strong-arm tactics in Eastern Europe, combined with strong opposition from key few French government officials, broke the power of the Party and sent it into a downward spiral. In 1949, Saloth Sâr, later known as "Pol Pot", travel to Paris for scholarship as a student. While in France, he became deeply involve Marxist–Leninist ideology with fierce Khmer nationalism as a form of extreme communism before he left in late 1952 and returned to Cambodia in early 1953.

Decolonisation of the French colonial empire gave Moscow the opportunity to provide propaganda support for anti-colonial fighters, as well as weapons, especially in Algeria and Vietnam. This angered French moderates.

Despite the pressure from the left, the Fourth Republic had more urgent concerns regarding relations with Germany, an economy supported by Marshall Aid, fears of communist subversion in the colonial empire, and American support for the anti-communist war in Vietnam. Official government policy supported the United States and NATO. When de Gaulle returned to power in the May 1958 crisis and establishment of the Fifth Republic, relations with Moscow improved. De Gaulle did not trust the United States to use nuclear weapons in defense of France, so it built its own. To enhance France's global prestige, he tried to be a broker between Moscow and Washington.

In May 1960, de Gaulle hosted a summit in Paris between Soviet leader Nikita Khrushchev and NATO leaders, but the 1960 U-2 incident rendered it unsuccessful. De Gaulle then moved away from NATO to concentrate more on Europe as an independent actor. He reduced reliance on the American military because the Cold War was heating up between Washington and Moscow. France never officially left NATO, but de Gaulle sharply reduced its military commitment In the 1960s.

Relations were badly hurt by Soviet invasion of Czechoslovakia in 1968, and the rejection of communism by numerous artists and intellectuals. However, the emergence of Eurocommunism made détente possible in the 1970s. Soviet General Secretary Mikhail Gorbachev made a visit to France in October 1985 in order to fix the strains in the Franco-Soviet relations. Nevertheless, France's bilateral activities continued with NATO, which made close deals with the communist USSR impossible. France officially recognized the modern Russian Federation as the sole successor state to the Soviet Union on 7 February 1992, following the collapse of the USSR and the Cold War came to an end in December 1991.

== See also ==
- Jean-Loup Chrétien (the first Frenchman in space, a member of the Soyuz T-6 crew alongside two Soviet cosmonauts, who flew in 1982 to the Soviet Salyut 7 space station)
- Foreign relations of France
- Foreign relations of the Soviet Union
- Foreign relations of Russia
- France–Russia relations
- France–Yugoslavia relations
