= Châtenoy, Loiret =

Châtenoy
- Commune
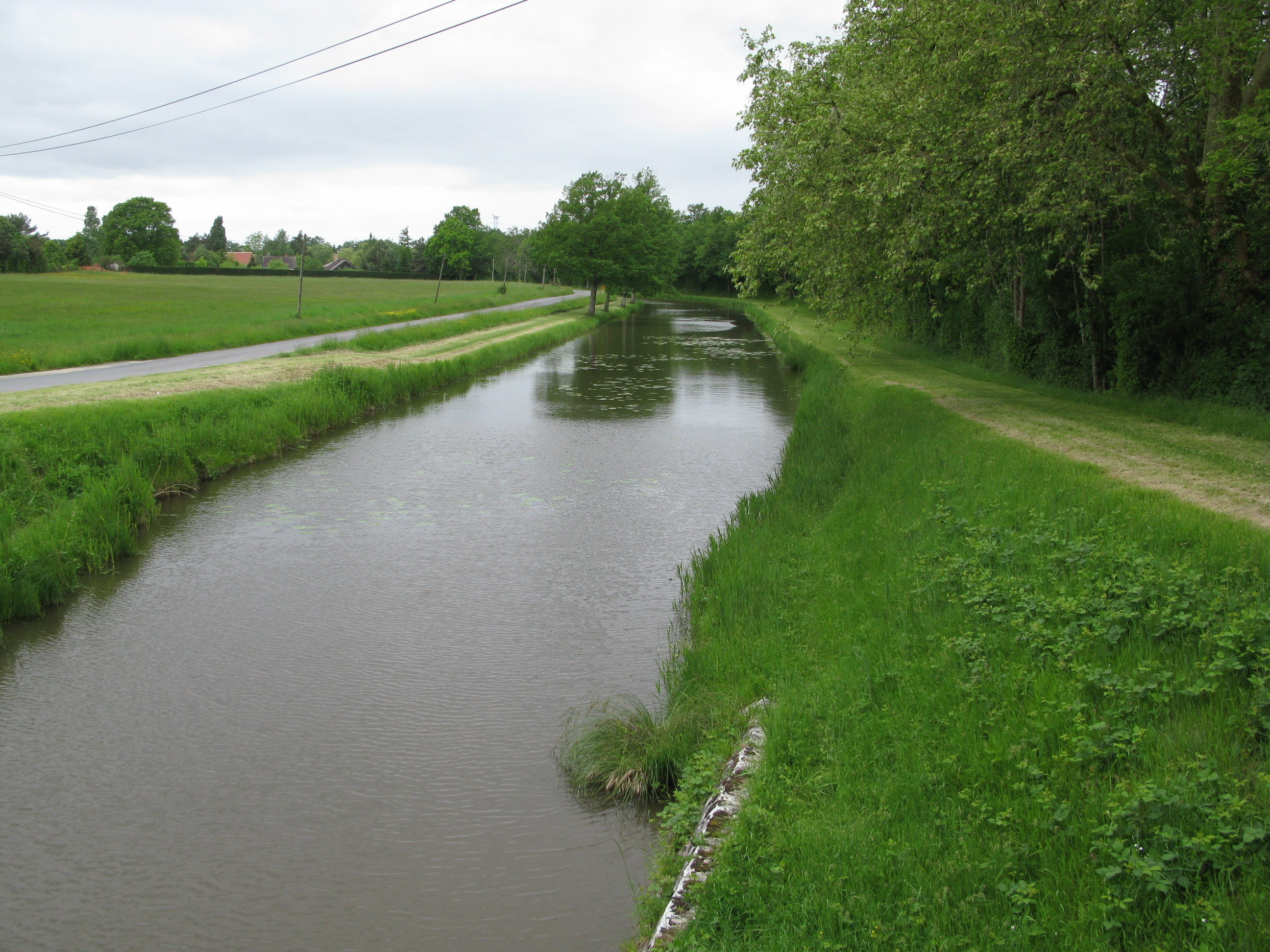
- The Orleans Canal at Châtenoy
- Location of Châtenoy
- Location within France Location within Centre-Val de Loire
- Coordinates: 47°55′09″N 2°23′51″E
- Country: France
- Region: Centre-Val de Loire
- Department: Loiret
- Arrondissement: Montargis
- Canton: Lorris

Government
  - Mayor (2020–2026): Dominique Blondeau
- Area^{1}: 25.84 km^{2} (9.98 sq mi)
- Highest elevation: 139 m (456 ft)
- Lowest elevation: 109 m (358 ft)
- Population (2023): 458
  - Density: 17.7/km^{2} (45.9/sq mi)
- Demonym: Castanéens
- Time zone: UTC+01:00 (CET)
  - Summer (DST): UTC+02:00 (CEST)
- INSEE/Postal code: 45084 /45260
- ^{1} French Land Register data, which excludes lakes, ponds, glaciers > 1 km^{2} (0.386 sq mi or 247 acres) and river estuaries.

Châtenoy (French pronunciation: [ʃatnwa]) is a commune in the Loiret department in north-central France.

== See also ==
- Communes of the Loiret department
