= Hanfstaengl =

Hanfstaengl (or Hanfstängl) is a German (Bavarian) surname, meaning "hemp stalk". Notable people with the surname include:

- Franz Hanfstaengl (1804–1877), German painter, lithographer, and photographer; father of Edgar
- Edgar Hanfstaengl (1842–1910), son of Franz; art publisher and father of Erna and Ernst
- Marie Hanfstängl (1848–1917), German soprano
- Erna Hanfstaengl (1885–1981), daughter of Edgar, sister of Ernst, and confidant of Adolf Hitler and Unity Mitford
- Ernst Hanfstaengl (1887–1975), son of Edgar, brother of Erna, and confidant of Adolf Hitler and Franklin Delano Roosevelt
- Egon Hanfstaengl (1921–2007), son of Ernst, German-American art publisher
