= Remilitarisation of the Rhineland =

1936 treaty violation by Nazi Germany

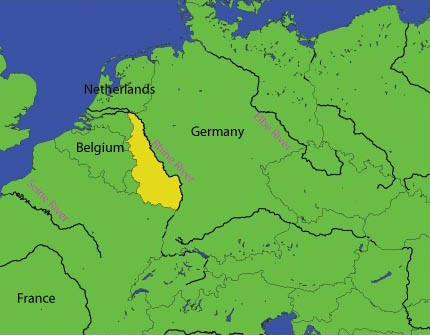
Location of the Rhineland, as defined by the Treaty of Versailles, along the Rhine

The remilitarisation of the Rhineland (German: Rheinlandbesetzung, pronounced [ˈʁaɪnlantˌbəˈzɛtsʊŋ]) began on 7 March 1936, when military forces of Nazi Germany entered the Rhineland, which directly contravened the Treaty of Versailles and the Locarno Treaties. Neither France nor Britain was prepared for a military response, so they did not act. After 1939, commentators often said that a strong military move in 1936 might have ruined the expansionist plans of Adolf Hitler, the dictator of Germany. However, recent historiography agrees that both public and elite opinion in Britain and France strongly opposed a military intervention, and neither had an army prepared to move in.

After the end of World War I, the Rhineland came under Allied occupation. Under the 1919 Treaty of Versailles, the German military was forbidden from all territories west of the Rhine or within 50 km east of it. The 1925 Locarno Treaties reaffirmed the then-permanently-demilitarised status of the Rhineland. In 1929, German Foreign Minister Gustav Stresemann negotiated the withdrawal of the Allied forces. The last soldiers left the Rhineland in June 1930.

After the Nazi regime took power in January 1933, Germany began working towards rearmament and the remilitarisation of the Rhineland. On 7 March 1936, using the Franco-Soviet Treaty of Mutual Assistance as a pretext, Hitler ordered the Wehrmacht to march 20,000 German troops into the Rhineland, which caused joyous celebrations across Germany. The French and the British governments, unwilling to risk war, decided against enforcing the treaties.

The remilitarisation and the German rearmament changed the balance of power in Europe from France and its allies towards Germany by allowing Germany to pursue a policy of aggression in Western Europe that had been blocked by the demilitarised status of the Rhineland.

The fact that Britain and France did not intervene made Hitler believe that neither country would get in the way of Nazi foreign policy. That made him decide to quicken the pace of German preparations for war and the domination of Europe. On 14 March 1936, during a speech in Munich, Hitler stated, "Neither threats nor warnings will prevent me from going my way. I follow the path assigned to me by Providence with the instinctive sureness of a sleepwalker".

== Background ==
=== Versailles and Locarno ===
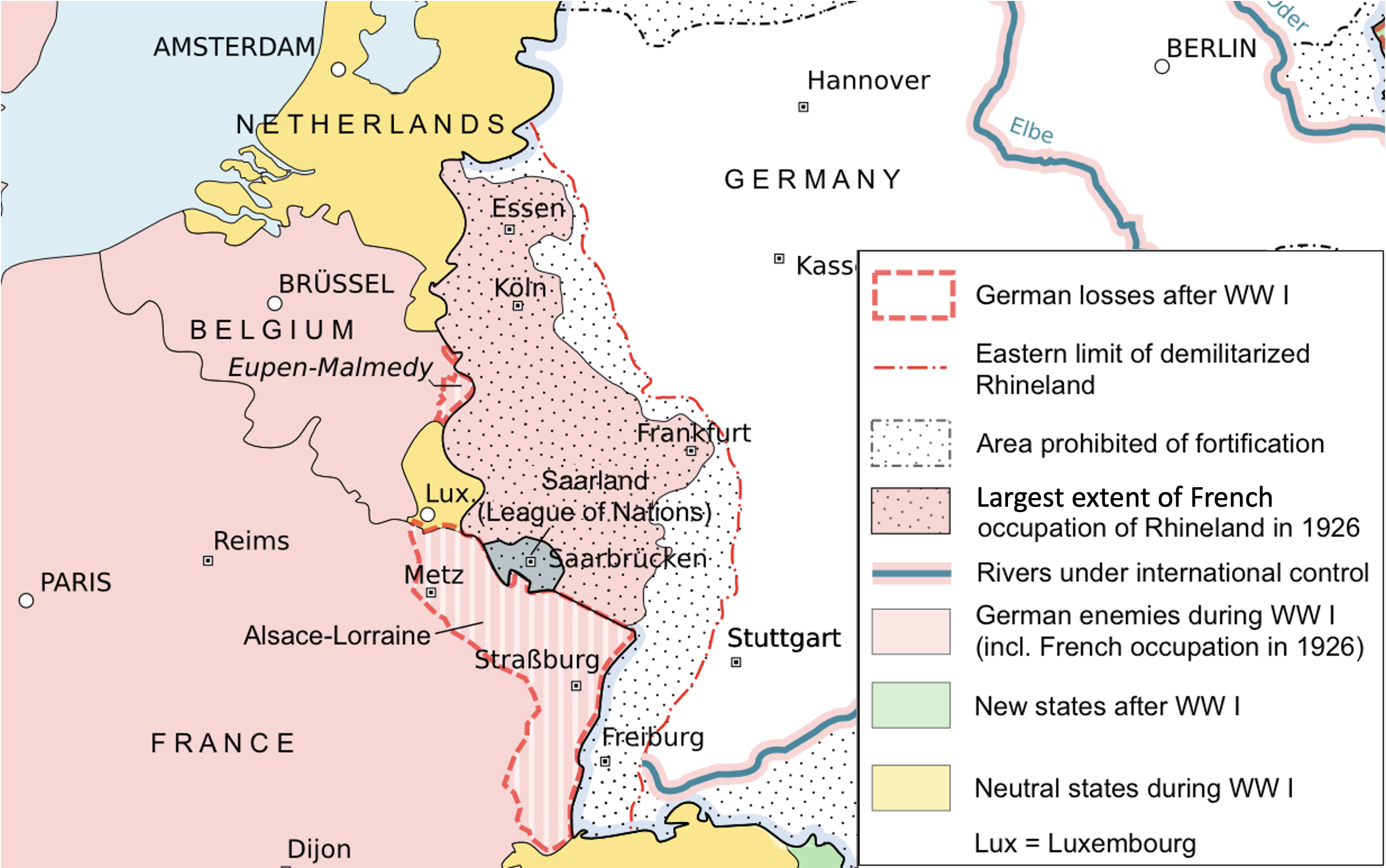
Border between France and Germany after World War I (1919–1926).

Under Articles 42, 43 and 44 of the 1919 Treaty of Versailles, which was imposed on Germany by the Allies after World War I, Germany was "forbidden to maintain or construct any fortification either on the Left bank of the Rhine or on the Right bank to the west of a line drawn fifty kilometers to the East of the Rhine". If a violation "in any manner whatsoever" of the article took place, it "shall be regarded as committing a hostile act... and as calculated to disturb the peace of the world". The Locarno Treaties, signed in October 1925 by Germany, France, Belgium, Italy and Britain, stated that the Rhineland should continue its demilitarised status permanently. Locarno was regarded as important by being a voluntary German acceptance of the Rhineland's demilitarised status, as opposed to the Diktat of Versailles.Emmerson, pp. 22–23 Locarno's terms had Britain and Italy vaguely guarantee the Franco-German and Belgian-German borders and the continued demilitarised status of the Rhineland against a "flagrant violation". A German attack on France required Britain and Italy to go to France's aid under Locarno, and a French attack on Germany required Britain and Italy to come to Germany's aid. The American historian Gerhard Weinberg called the demilitarised status of the Rhineland the "single most important guarantee of peace in Europe" by preventing Germany from attacking its western neighbours and, since the demilitarised zone rendered Germany defenseless in the West, by making it impossible to attack its eastern neighbours by leaving Germany open to a devastating French offensive if the Germans tried to invade any state guaranteed by the French alliance system in Eastern Europe, the cordon sanitaire.

The Versailles Treaty also stipulated that Allied military forces would withdraw from the Rhineland by 1935. The British delegation at the Hague Conference on German war reparations proposed decreasing the amount of money paid by Germany in reparations in exchange for the British and French forces evacuating the Rhineland. The last British soldiers left in late 1929, and the last French soldiers left in June 1930.

As long as the French continued to occupy the Rhineland, it functioned as a form of "collateral" under which the French could respond to any German attempt at overt rearmament by annexing the Rhineland. Once the last French soldiers left the Rhineland in June 1930, it could no longer play its "collateral" role, which opened the door for German rearmament. The French decision to build the Maginot Line in 1929 was a tacit French admission that it would be only a matter of time before German rearmament on a massive scale would begin sometime in the 1930s and that the Rhineland was going to be remilitarised sooner or later. Intelligence from the Deuxième Bureau indicated that Germany had been violating Versailles throughout the 1920s with the considerable help of the Soviet Union. With the French troops out of the Rhineland, Germany could be expected to violate Versailles only more openly. The Maginot Line, in turn, lessened the importance of the Rhineland's demilitarised status from the view of French security.

=== Foreign policy ===
The foreign policy of Fascist Italy was to maintain an "equidistant" stance from all the major powers and to exercise the "determinant weight" with which the power Italy chose to align would decisively change the balance of power in Europe. The price of such an alignment would be support for Italian ambitions in Europe and/or Africa.

The foreign policy goal of the Soviet Union was set forth by Joseph Stalin in a speech on 19 January 1925 that if another world war broke out between the capitalist states, "We will enter the fray at the end, throwing our critical weight onto the scale, a weight that should prove to be decisive". To promote that goal, the global triumph of communism, the Soviet Union tended to support German efforts to challenge the Versailles system by assisting the secret rearmament of Germany, a policy that caused much tension with France.

An additional factor in Franco-Soviet relations was the Russian debt issue. Before 1917, the French had been by far the largest investors in Imperial Russia and the largest buyers of Russian debt. Thus, the decision by Vladimir Lenin in 1918 to repudiate all debts and to confiscate all private property owned by Russians or foreigners, had hurt French business and finance quite badly. The questions of both the Russian debt repudiation and of compensation for French businesses that had been affected by Soviet nationalisation policies poisoned Franco-Soviet relations until the early 1930s.

The cornerstone of interwar French diplomacy had been the cordon sanitaire or Little Entente in Eastern Europe, which was intended to keep both the Soviets and the Germans out of Eastern Europe. France had thus signed treaties of alliance with Poland in 1921, with Czechoslovakia in 1924, with Romania in 1926 and with Yugoslavia in 1927. The cordon sanitaire states were intended as a collective replacement for Imperial Russia as France's chief eastern ally and emerged as areas of French political, military, economic and cultural influence.

It had always been assumed by the states of the cordon sanitaire that a German attack would cause France to respond by starting an offensive into western Germany.

Before 1933, German military and diplomatic leaders viewed the Rhineland's demilitarised status as temporary, aiming to remilitarise it when diplomatically opportune. In December 1918, Germany's top generals, viewing the army as a "state within the state", sought to rebuild their military to achieve the "world power status" lost in the previous war. Throughout the 1920s and early 1930s, the Reichswehr planned for wars against France and Poland, anticipating Rhineland's remilitarisation. To prepare, the government maintained barracks, secretly stored military supplies, and built versatile towers along the border.

From 1919 to 1932, British defense spending operated under the Ten Year Rule, anticipating no major wars for a decade, which severely reduced the military's capabilities. Although never outright rejected, Britain was hesitant about the "continental commitment" of deploying a large army in Continental Europe, especially against Germany, due to the heavy losses of World War I. During the Interwar Period, Britain was wary of security commitments in Eastern Europe, seeing the region as potentially drawing them into unwanted conflicts. Their readiness extended mainly to limited engagements in Western Europe.

In 1925, the British Foreign Secretary, Sir Austen Chamberlain, stated at Locarno that the Polish Corridor was not "worth the bones of a single British grenadier". Consequently, Chamberlain suggested the Polish Corridor's return to Germany and did not guarantee the German-Polish border. Even their commitments at Locarno were tentative, evident by Whitehall's restriction against military discussions with Germany, France, and Italy in the event of a Locarno violation.

Overall, British foreign policy during the 1920s and 1930s favored appeasement, adjusting the Versailles-established system to Germany's benefit, hoping this would ensure peace. A key British goal at Locarno was to enable Germany's peaceful territorial ambitions in Eastern Europe, believing improved Franco-German ties would weaken France's cordon sanitaire.

Once France had abandoned its allies in Eastern Europe as the price of better relations with Germany, the Poles and Czechoslovaks would be forced to adjust to German demands and maintain peace by handing over the territories that were claimed by Germany such as the Sudetenland, the Polish Corridor and the Free City of Danzig (now Gdańsk, Poland). The British tended to exaggerate French power, and even Sir Robert "Van" Vansittart, the Permanent Under-Secretary of State for Foreign Affairs, who was normally pro-French, wrote in 1931 that Britain was faced with an "unbearable" French domination of Europe and that a revival of German power was needed to counterbalance French power.

Whitehall little appreciated France's economic and demographic weaknesses in the face of Germany's strengths. For example, Germany had a much larger population and economy than France and had been little damaged during World War I although France had been devastated.

== European situation (1933–1936) ==
=== Diplomacy ===
In March 1933, German Defence Minister General Werner von Blomberg had plans drawn up for remilitarisation. In the fall of 1933, he began to provide a number of the paramilitary Landespolizei units in the Rhineland with secret military training and military weapons to prepare for remilitarisation. General Ludwig Beck's memo of March 1935 on the need for Germany to secure Lebensraum (living space) in Eastern Europe had accepted that remilitarisation should take place once it was diplomatically possible. It was generally believed by German military, diplomatic and political elites that remilitarisation would be impossible before 1937.

The change of regime in Germany in January 1933 caused alarm in London, but there was considerable uncertainty about Hitler's long-term intentions, which underscored much of British policy towards Germany until 1939. The British could never quite decide if Hitler wanted merely to reverse Versailles or if he had the goal of seeking to dominate Europe. British policy toward Germany was a dual-track policy of seeking a "general settlement" in which "legitimate" German complaints about the Versailles Treaty would be addressed, but the British would rearm to negotiate with Germany from a position of strength, to deter Hitler from choosing war as an option and to ensure that Britain was prepared in the worst case that Hitler was truly intent on conquering Europe. In February 1934, a secret report by the Defence Requirements Committee identified Germany as the "ultimate potential enemy" against which British rearmament was to be directed. Although the possibility of German bombing attacks against British cities increased the importance of having a friendly power on the other side of the English Channel, many British decision-makers were cool, if not downright hostile, toward the idea of the "continental commitment". When British rearmament began in 1934, the army received the lowest priority in terms of funding, after the air force and the navy, which was partly to rule out the option of "continental commitment". Increasingly, the British came to favor the idea of "limited liability" under which if the "continental commitment" were to be made, Britain should send only the smallest-possible expeditionary force to Europe but reserve its main efforts towards the war in the air and on the sea. Britain's refusal to make the continental commitment on the same scale as World War I caused tensions with the French, who believed that it would be impossible to defeat Germany without another large-scale ground force and deeply disliked the idea that they should do the bulk of the fighting on their land.

In 1934, French Foreign Minister Louis Barthou decided to end to any potential German aggression by building a network of alliances that was intended to encircle Germany. He made overtures to the Soviet Union and Italy. Until 1933, the Soviet Union had supported German efforts to challenge the Versailles system, but the strident anticommunism of the German regime and its claim for Lebensraum led the Soviets to change their position toward maintaining the Versailles system. In September 1933, the Soviet Union ended its secret support for German rearmament, which had started in 1921. Under the guise of collective security, Soviet Foreign Commissar Maxim Litvinov started to praise the Versailles system, which the Soviet leaders had denounced as a capitalist plot to "enslave" Germany.

In the 1920s, Italian prime minister Benito Mussolini had started to subsidise the right-wing Heimwehr ("Home Defense") movement in Austria, and after Austrian chancellor Engelbert Dollfuss had seized dictatorial power in March 1933, Austria fell within the Italian sphere of influence. The terrorist campaign mounted by Austrian Nazis, which the Austrian government accused of being supported by Germany against the reactionary Dollfuss regime, had the aim of overthrowing him to achieve the Anschluss, which caused considerable tensions between Rome and Berlin. Mussolini had warned Hitler several times that Austria was within the Italian, not the German, sphere of influence and that the Germans had to cease trying to overthrow Dollfuss, an Italian protégé. On 25 July 1934, the July Putsch in Vienna had seen Dollfuss assassinated by the Austrian SS and an announcement by the Austrian Nazis that the Anschluss was at hand. The Austrian Nazis attempted to seize power all over Austria, and the SS Austrian Legion, based in Bavaria, began to attack frontier posts along the German-Austrian border in what looked like the beginning of an invasion. In response, Mussolini mobilised the Royal Italian Army, concentrated several divisions at the Brenner Pass and warned Hitler that Italy would go to war against Germany if it tried to follow up the Putsch by invading Austria. The Austrian-born Hitler, although deeply offended by Mussolini's blunt assertions that his birthplace was within the sphere of influence of any power other than Germany, realised that he was in no position to do anything except to beat a humiliating retreat. To his disgust, he had to disallow the Putsch that he had ordered and could not follow it up by invading Austria, whose government crushed the Austrian Nazis' coup attempt.

After Barthou was assassinated on 9 October 1934, his work in trying to build anti-German alliances with the Soviet Union and Italy was continued by his successor, Pierre Laval. On 7 January 1935, during a summit in Rome, Laval essentially told Mussolini that Italy had a "free hand" in the Horn of Africa and that France would not oppose an Italian invasion of Abyssinia (now Ethiopia). On 14 April 1935, British prime minister Ramsay MacDonald, French prime minister Laval and Italian prime minister Mussolini met in Stresa to form the Stresa Front opposing any further German violations of Versailles after Germany stated in March 1935 that it would no longer abide by Parts V or VI of the Versailles Treaty. In the spring of 1935 joint staff talks had begun between France and Italy with the aim of forming an anti-German military alliance. On 2 May 1935, Laval travelled to Moscow, where he signed a treaty of alliance with the Soviet Union. At once the German government began a violent press campaign against the Franco-Soviet Pact, which claimed it was a violation of Locarno and an immense danger to Germany by encircling it.

In his "peace speech" of May 21, 1935, Hitler stated, "In particular, they [the Germans] will uphold and fulfill all obligations arising out of the Locarno Treaty, so long as the other parties are on their side ready to stand by that pact". That line in Hitler's speech was written by Foreign Minister Baron Konstantin von Neurath, who wished to reassure foreign leaders who felt threatened by Germany's denunciation in March 1935 of Part V of Versailles, which had disarmed Germany. Meanwhile, Neurath wanted to provide an opening for the eventual remilitarisation of the Rhineland and so he hedged the promise to obey Locarno by adding that it was only if other powers did the same. Hitler had always taken the line that Germany did not consider itself bound by the Diktat of Versailles but would respect any treaty that it willingly signed, such as Locarno, under which Germany had promised to keep the Rhineland permanently demilitarised. Thus, Hitler always promised during his "peace speeches" to obey Locarno, not Versailles.

=== Abyssinia Crisis ===
On 7 June 1935, MacDonald resigned as prime minister and was succeeded by Stanley Baldwin. On October 3, 1935, Italy invaded Ethiopia, marking the onset of the Abyssinia Crisis. The British government, buoyed by public opinion in favor of collective security, championed sanctions against Italy through the League of Nations.

This British stance on collective security created tensions with France. The French prioritised their security concerns regarding Nazi Germany and hoped to preserve the Stresa Front with Italy, even at the cost of Ethiopia. The French reluctance to impose sanctions against Italy revealed a strategic division between Paris and London. The ensuing diplomatic tensions presented Germany with an opportunity to contemplate the remilitarisation of the Rhineland.

The complexity of the situation was further exacerbated when the Hoare–Laval Pact, a controversial proposal to partition Ethiopia between Italy and an Ethiopian rump state, was leaked. Its exposure led to strong negative reactions in both Britain and France, resulting in the resignation of British Foreign Secretary Samuel Hoare.

Meanwhile, Germany extended support to Italy during the Abyssinia Crisis, further strengthening Italo-German ties. This shift in relations, combined with the diplomatic friction between Britain and France, set the stage for Germany's maneuvers regarding the Rhineland.

== German remilitarisation ==
=== Neurath and secret intelligence ===
British Foreign Secretary Anthony Eden believed that by 1940, Germany might rejoin the League of Nations, accept arms restrictions, and give up European territorial claims if they could remilitarise the Rhineland, reclaim former African colonies, and have "economic priority along the Danube". Ralph Wigram of the Foreign Office proposed allowing Germany's Rhineland remilitarisation in exchange for an "air pact" against bombing and Germany's commitment to stable borders, but this idea didn't gain traction. Eden aimed for a "general settlement" that would see a return to 1920s stability and have Hitler act diplomatically, much like the Weimar Republic's Stresemann.

In January 1936, the French premier Pierre Laval presented the Franco-Soviet Pact for ratification. Later that month, during a London visit, Neurath informed Eden that Germany would reconsider its stance on the Locarno Pact if other signatories made bilateral agreements that conflicted with its spirit. Eden's subsequent reaction gave Neurath the impression that Britain might support Germany against France in the event of Rhineland's remilitarisation. The Locarno treaty contained a clause that called for arbitration of "all disputes" in which "the parties are in conflict as to their respective rights". Both Neurath and State Secretary Prince Bernhard von Bülow felt the Franco-Soviet Pact violated the Locarno agreement but advised Hitler against seeking arbitration, fearing it would remove their excuse for remilitarisation. Though Neurath hinted at invoking the Locarno's arbitration clause in early 1936, Germany never did.

At the same time, Neurath received an intelligence report on 10 January 1936 from Gottfried Aschmann, the Chief of the Auswärtiges Amt's Press Division, who during a visit to Paris in early January 1936 had talked to a minor French politician named Jean Montiny who was a close friend of Premier Laval, who had frankly mentioned that France's economic problems had retarded French military modernisation and that France would do nothing if Germany remilitarised the Rhineland. Neurath did not pass on Aschmann's report to Hitler, but he placed a high value upon it. Neurath was seeking to improve his position within the Nazi regime; by repeatedly assuring Hitler during the Rhineland crisis that the French would do nothing without telling Hitler the source of his self-assurance, Neurath came across as a diplomat blessed with an uncanny intuition, something that improved his standing with Hitler. Traditionally in Germany the conduct of foreign policy had been the work of the Auswärtiges Amt (Foreign Office), but starting in 1933 Neurath had been faced with the threat of Nazi "interlopers in diplomacy" as various NSDAP agencies started to conduct their own foreign policies independent of and often against the Auswärtiges Amt. The most serious of the "interlopers in diplomacy" was the Dienststelle Ribbentrop, a sort of alternative foreign ministry loosely linked to the NSDAP headed by Joachim von Ribbentrop which aggressively sought to undercut the work of the Auswärtiges Amt at every turn. Further exacerbating the rivalry between the Dienststelle Ribbentrop and the Auswärtiges Amt was that Neurath and Ribbentrop utterly hated one another, with Ribbentrop making no secret of his belief that he would be a much better foreign minister than Neurath, whereas Neurath viewed Ribbentrop as a hopelessly inept amateur diplomat meddling in matters that did not concern him.

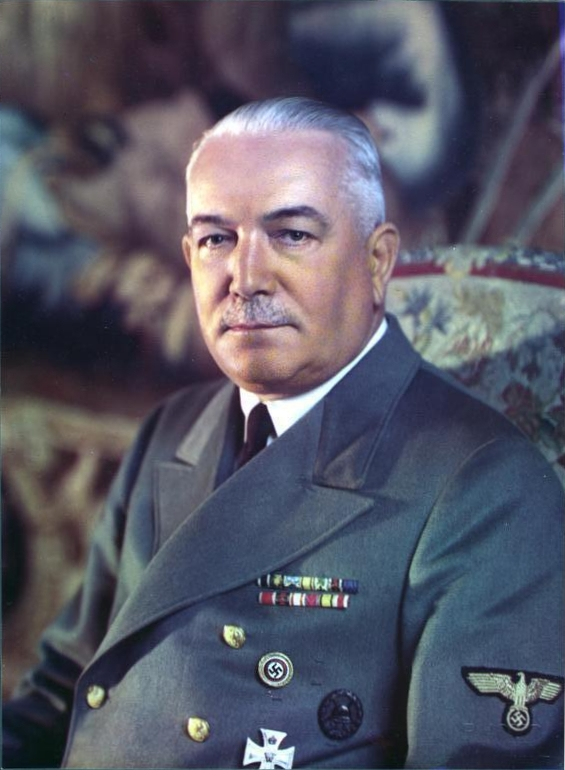
Baron Konstantin von Neurath in 1939. As Foreign Minister in 1936, Neurath played a decisive role in German decision-making that led to the remilitarisation.

=== Remilitarisation Decision ===
In January 1936, Hitler accelerated his plans to remilitarise the Rhineland from 1937 to 1936. This decision was influenced by several factors, including France's ratification of the Franco-Soviet pact, political instability in Paris, Germany's economic challenges, and the disruption caused by the Second Italo-Abyssinian War, which weakened the Stresa Front.

French ambassador André François-Poncet confronted Prince Bernhard von Bülow, the State Secretary at the Auswärtiges Amt, in a January 1936 meeting, accusing Germany of planning to send troops back to the Rhineland. However, this intelligence was not shared with Britain or France.

Italy's Benito Mussolini, frustrated with sanctions related to Italy's Ethiopian campaign, expressed a desire for an Austro-German agreement, signaling a potential improvement in Italo-German relations.

In February 1936, a caretaker government took charge in Paris under Albert Sarraut, but its diverse makeup resulted in decision-making paralysis.

Hitler consulted with Joachim von Ribbentrop and Neurath in late February about potential international reactions to the Rhineland's remilitarisation. Ribbentrop advocated immediate action, while Neurath believed quiet diplomacy would ensure remilitarisation.

On February 12, Hitler informed his war minister, Field Marshal Werner von Blomberg, of his intentions. The Chief of the General Staff, General Ludwig Beck, warned Hitler that the German Army was ill-prepared for conflict with the French Army.

Unknown to Hitler, Eden had written to the Quai d'Orsay in mid-February, suggesting negotiations to surrender rights in the zone. Eden believed this would weaken France's influence in Central and Eastern Europe.

Neurath prepared documents justifying remilitarisation as a response to the Franco-Soviet pact, advising a small troop presence to avoid a "flagrant violation" of Locarno.

Meanwhile, Hermann Göring went to Warsaw to ask Poland to remain neutral if France decided on war in response to remilitarisation.

Historians debate Hitler's decision. "Intentionist" historians see it as part of Hitler's world conquest plan, while "functionist" historians view it as an improvised response to economic problems in 1936.

On February 26, the French National Assembly ratified the Franco-Soviet pact. On February 27, Hitler discussed remilitarisation with Göring and Joseph Goebbels, deciding it was "still somewhat too early."

Hitler's interview with Bertrand de Jouvenel, published on February 29, aimed to shift blame for remilitarisation onto the French government. Hitler finally made the decision on March 1, partly influenced by the focus on the Abyssinia Crisis due to the League's discussions on oil sanctions against Italy.

=== The Wehrmacht marches ===
Not long after dawn on March 7, 1936, nineteen German infantry battalions and a handful of planes entered the Rhineland. By doing so, Germany violated Articles 42 and 43 of the Treaty of Versailles and Articles 1 and 2 of the Treaty of Locarno. They reached the river Rhine by 11:00 a.m. and then three battalions crossed to the west bank of the Rhine. At the same time, Baron von Neurath summoned the Italian ambassador Baron Bernardo Attolico, the British ambassador Sir Eric Phipps and the French ambassador André François-Poncet to the Wilhelmstrasse to hand them notes accusing France of violating Locarno by ratifying the Franco-Soviet pact, and announcing that as such Germany had decided to renounce Locarno and remilitarise the Rhineland.

When German reconnaissance learned that thousands of French soldiers were congregating on the Franco-German border, General Blomberg begged Hitler to evacuate the German forces. Under Blomberg's influence, Hitler nearly ordered the German troops to withdraw, but was then persuaded by the resolutely calm Neurath to continue with Operation Winter Exercise. Following Neurath's advice, Hitler inquired whether the French forces had actually crossed the border and when informed that they had not, he assured Blomberg that Germany would wait until this happened. In marked contrast to Blomberg who was highly nervous during Operation Winter Exercise, Neurath stayed calm and very much urged Hitler to stay the course.

The Rhineland coup is often seen as the moment when Hitler could have been stopped with very little effort; the German forces involved in the move were small, compared to the much larger, and at the time more powerful, French military. The American journalist William L. Shirer wrote if the French had marched into the Rhineland,

... in March 1936 the two Western democracies, were given their last chance to halt, without the risk of a serious war, the rise of a militarized, aggressive, totalitarian Germany and, in fact – as we have seen Hitler admitting – bring the Nazi dictator and his regime tumbling down. They let the chance slip.

A German officer assigned to the Bendlerstrasse during the crisis told H. R. Knickerbocker during the Spanish Civil War: "... we knew that if the French marched, we were done. We had no fortifications, and no army to match the French. If the French had even mobilised, we should have been compelled to retire." The general staff, the officer said, considered Hitler's action suicidal. General Heinz Guderian, a German general interviewed by French officers after the Second World War, claimed: "If you French had intervened in the Rhineland in 1936 we should have been sunk and Hitler would have fallen."

That Hitler faced serious opposition gains apparent weight from the fact that Ludwig Beck and Werner von Fritsch did indeed become opponents of Hitler but according to the American historian Ernest R. May, there is no evidence for this at this stage. May wrote that the German Army officer corps was all for remilitarising the Rhineland, and only the question of timing of such a move divided them from Hitler.

Writing about relations between Hitler and his generals in early 1936, the American historian J.T. Emerson declared: "In fact, at no time during the twelve-year existence of the Third Reich did Hitler enjoy more amicable relations with his generals than in 1935 and 1936. During these years, there was nothing like an organized military resistance to party politics". Later on in World War II, despite the increasing desperate situation of Germany from 1942 onwards and a whole series of humiliating defeats, the overwhelming majority of the Wehrmacht stayed loyal to the Nazi regime and continued to fight hard for that regime right up to its destruction in 1945 (the only exception being the 20 July plot in 1944, in which only a minority of the Wehrmacht rebelled while the majority remained loyal). The willingness of the Wehrmacht to continue to fight and die for the National Socialist regime despite the fact Germany was clearly losing the war from 1943 onward reflected the deep commitment of most of the Wehrmacht to National Socialism.

Furthermore, the senior officers of the Wehrmacht were deeply corrupt men, who received huge bribes from Hitler in exchange for their loyalty. Given the intense devotion of the Wehrmacht to the National Socialist regime and its corrupt senior officers, it is unlikely the Wehrmacht would have turned on the Führer if the Wehrmacht were forced out of the Rhineland in 1936.

== Reactions ==
=== Germany ===
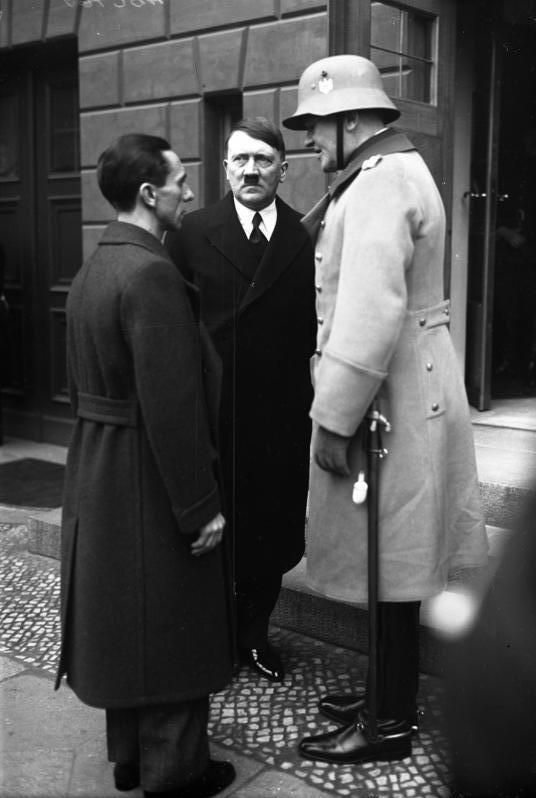
Goebbels, Hitler, and von Blomberg

On 7 March 1936 Hitler announced before the Reichstag that the Rhineland had been remilitarised, and to blunt the danger of war, Hitler offered to return to the League of Nations, to sign an air pact to outlaw bombing as a way of war, and a non-aggression pact with France if the other powers agreed to accept the remilitarisation. In his address to the Reichstag, Hitler began with a lengthy denunciation of the Treaty of Versailles as unfair to Germany, claimed that he was a "man of peace who wanted war with no-one", and argued that he was only seeking equality for Germany by peacefully overturning the supposedly unfair Treaty of Versailles.

Hearst wire service reporter William L. Shirer, who reported on the speech from Berlin, described in his diary the moment when Hitler suddenly revealed to the assembled deputies of the Reichstag that German troops had already entered the Rhineland:

They spring, yelling and crying, to their feet. The audience in the galleries does the same.... Their hands are raised in slavish salute, their faces now contorted with hysteria, their mouths wide open, shouting, shouting, their eyes, burning with fanaticism, glued on the new god, the Messiah. The Messiah plays his role superbly. His head lowered as if in all humbleness, he waits patiently for silence. Then, his voice still low, but choking with emotion, utters the two vows:

"First, we swear to yield to no force whatever in the restoration of the honour of our people, preferring to succumb with honour to the severest hardships rather than to capitulate. Secondly, we pledge that now, more than ever, we shall strive for an understanding between European peoples, especially for one with our western neighbor nations.... We have no territorial demands to make in Europe!... Germany will never break the peace."

Hitler claimed that it was unfair that because of Versailles a part of Germany should be demilitarised whereas in every other nation of the world a government could order its troops to anywhere within its borders, and claimed all he wanted was "equality" for Germany.

Even then, Hitler claimed that he would have been willing to accept the continued demilitarisation of the Rhineland as Stresemann had promised at Locarno in 1925 as the price for peace, had it not been for the Franco-Soviet Pact of 1935, which he maintained was threatening to Germany and had left him with no other choice than to remilitarise the Rhineland. With his eye on public opinion abroad, Hitler made a point of stressing that the remilitarisation was not intended to threaten anyone else, but was instead only a defensive measure imposed on Germany by what he claimed were the menacing actions of France and the Soviet Union.

William L. Shirer wrote in his diary that Hitler's effort to cloak the march into the Rhineland as 'purely defensive' was "a pure fraud, and if I had any guts, or American journalism had any, I would have said so in my dispatch tonight. But I am not supposed to be 'editorial.'... Francois Ponçet (the French ambassador) told a friend of mine tonight that he had been lied to three times by the German Foreign Office on the subject in the course of the day. The Germans first announced 2,000 troops, then later 9,500 with 'thirteen detachments of artillery.' My information is that they've sent in four divisions - about 50,000 men."

At least some people abroad accepted Hitler's claim that he been forced to take this step because of the Franco-Soviet pact. Former British prime minister David Lloyd George stated in the House of Commons that Hitler's actions in the wake of the Franco-Soviet pact were fully justified, and he would have been a traitor to Germany if he had not protected his country.

When German troops marched into Cologne, a vast cheering crowd formed spontaneously to greet the soldiers, throwing flowers onto the Wehrmacht while Catholic priests offered to bless the soldiers. In Germany, the news that the Rhineland had been remilitarised was greeted with wild celebrations all over the country; the British historian Sir Ian Kershaw wrote of March 1936 that: "People were besides themselves with delight ... It was almost impossible not to be caught up in the infectious mood of joy". Reports to the Sopade in the spring of 1936 mentioned that a great many erstwhile Social Democrats and opponents of the Nazis amongst the working class had nothing but approval of the remilitarisation, and that many who had once been opposed to the Nazis under the Weimar Republic were now beginning to support them.

To capitalise on the vast popularity of the remilitarisation, Hitler called a referendum on 29 March 1936 in which the majority of German voters expressed their approval of the remilitarisation. During his campaign stops to ask for a yes vote, Hitler was greeted with huge crowds roaring their approval of his defiance of Versailles. Kershaw wrote that the 99% ja (yes) vote in the referendum was improbably high, but it is clear that an overwhelming majority of voters did genuinely choose to vote yes when asked if they approved of the remilitarisation.

In the aftermath of the remilitarisation, the economic crisis which had so damaged the National Socialist regime's popularity was forgotten by almost all. After the Rhineland triumph, Hitler's confidence surged to new heights, and those who knew him well stated that after March 1936 there was a real psychological change as Hitler was utterly convinced of his infallibility in a way that he had not before been.

=== France ===
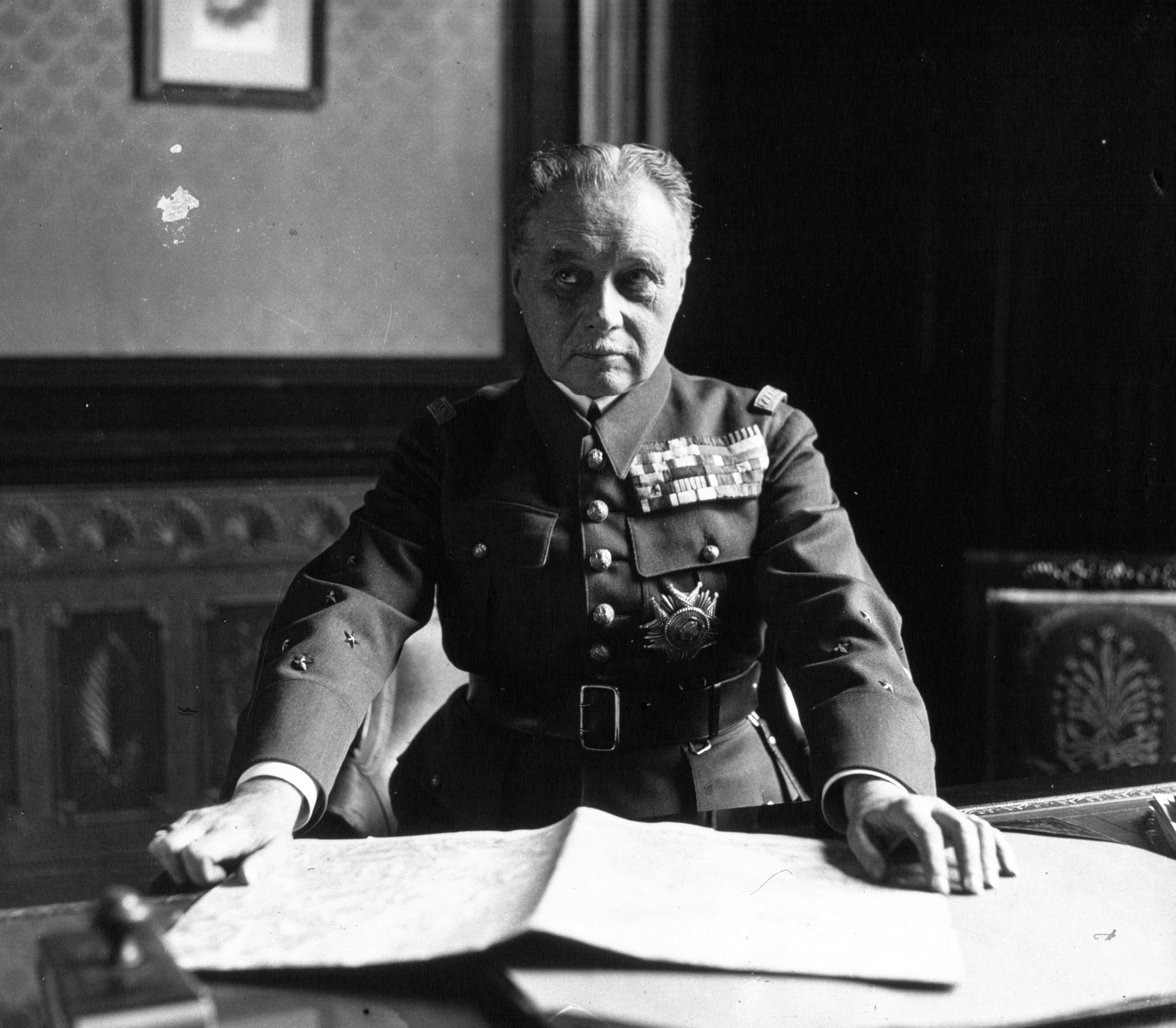
General Maurice Gamelin, the French Supreme Commander, 1936

Historians differ in their interpretations of France's response to the remilitarisation of the Rhineland by Nazi Germany in 1936. Some argue that France, despite having a superior military force compared to Germany, lacked the will to use force, as they possessed 100 divisions to Germany's 19 battalions in the Rhineland. This interpretation has contributed to the "décadence" theory, suggesting that French decadence led to a decline in their willpower and their eventual defeat in 1940.

However, other historians like Stephen A. Schuker dispute this view after accessing French primary sources. They point out that economic constraints and military analysis greatly influenced France's hesitation. General Maurice Gamelin, for instance, informed the French government that challenging Germany in the Rhineland would require full mobilisation, costing 30 million francs per day and possibly escalating into a full-blown war. The French intelligence service, the Deuxième Bureau, overestimated German troops in the Rhineland, further complicating matters.

In addition, France was facing a financial crisis in late 1935 to early 1936, which made devaluation of the franc politically unacceptable. This crisis was exacerbated by the German remilitarisation, causing a massive cash flow out of France due to investor concerns about war with Germany.

The state of the French Air Force was another concern, as it was considered inferior to the Luftwaffe, and issues with productivity in the French aircraft industry hampered its ability to replace losses in case of war. France's dependencies on the states of the "cordon sanitaire" further complicated its response, as only Czechoslovakia was firmly committed to war with Germany if France acted in the Rhineland.

While public opinion in France was hostile towards Germany's move, few called for war. Most French newspapers advocated League of Nations sanctions against Germany. The French government issued statements hinting at military action, but the decision depended on Britain and Italy taking similar actions.

French Foreign Minister Pierre Étienne Flandin sought British commitment in the face of German remilitarisation. Prime Minister Albert Sarraut declared France's intent to maintain the Treaty of Locarno's guarantees. France offered its forces to the League of Nations, but only if Britain and Italy did the same. Georges Mandel was the only French minister advocating immediate military action to expel German troops from the Rhineland.

Flandin's approach aimed to secure the "continental commitment" from Britain, aligning British security with French security and obtaining British support. In London, Flandin expressed outrage and hinted at French readiness for war, but he failed to provide concrete security measures. In response to Flandin's tactics, Britain issued a vague statement linking British security to French security and agreed to limited Anglo-French staff talks, disappointing some in the French government.

Gamelin warned that if France acted, it needed British assistance. The French government, fearing the financial crisis and an upcoming election, chose not to mobilise the French Army, effectively ending the security France had over Germany through the Treaty of Versailles.

=== United Kingdom ===
The reaction in Britain was mixed, but they did not generally regard the remilitarisation as harmful. Lord Lothian famously said it was no more than the Germans walking into their own backyard. George Bernard Shaw similarly claimed it was no different than if Britain had reoccupied Portsmouth. In his diary entry for 23 March, Harold Nicolson MP noted that "the feeling in the House [of Commons] is terribly pro-German, which means afraid of war". During the Rhineland crisis of 1936, no public meetings or rallies were held anywhere in protest at the remilitarisation of the Rhineland, and instead there were several "peace" rallies where it was demanded that Britain not use war to resolve the crisis. Ever since the economist John Maynard Keynes had published his best-selling book The Economic Consequences of the Peace in 1919—in which Keynes depicted Versailles as an unbearably harsh Carthaginian peace imposed by the vindictive Allies—an increasingly large segment of British public opinion had become convinced that the Treaty of Versailles was deeply "unjust" to Germany. By 1936, when German troops marched back into the Rhineland, the majority of British people believed that Hitler was right to violate the "unjust" Versailles treaty, and it would be morally wrong for Britain to go to war to uphold the "unjust" Treaty of Versailles. The British War Secretary Duff Cooper told the German Ambassador Leopold von Hoesch on 8 March: "though the British people were prepared to fight for France in the event of a German incursion into French territory, they would not resort to arms on account of the recent occupation of the Rhineland. The people did not know much about the demilitarisation provisions and most of them probably took the view that they did not care 'two hoots' about the Germans reoccupying their own territory".

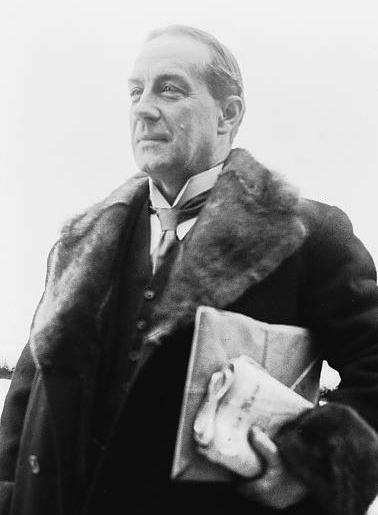
Prime Minister Stanley Baldwin, unknown date

Prime Minister Stanley Baldwin claimed that Britain lacked the resources to enforce its treaty guarantees and that public opinion would not stand for military force. The Chiefs of Staff Committee had warned that war with Germany was inadvisable due to the deep cuts imposed by the Ten Year Rule and that rearmament had only begun in 1934, which meant that the most Britain could do in the event of war would be to send two divisions with obsolete equipment to France after three weeks of preparation. Fears were also expressed in Whitehall that if Britain went to war with Germany, Japan might take advantage of the war to start seizing Britain's Asian colonies.

British Foreign Secretary Anthony Eden advised against French military action and opposed financial or economic sanctions on Germany. Instead, he met French ambassador Charles Corbin to promote restraint. Eden's preference was for Germany to retain only a symbolic troop presence in the Rhineland and then engage in renegotiations.

A significant factor in British policy was the reluctance of the Dominions to support military action. High Commissioners from Dominions like South Africa and Canada signaled they wouldn't support war over the Rhineland's demilitarised status. Historian Gerhard Weinberg noted that by 13 March, it was clear that Dominions, notably South Africa and Canada, wouldn't back Britain in a conflict. South Africa, in particular, endorsed Germany's stance in London and other Dominion capitals.

South African prime minister J. B. M. Hertzog and Canadian prime minister William Lyon Mackenzie King both faced domestic groups, the Afrikaners and French Canadians respectively, who were resistant to another war against Germany under British influence. Both leaders viewed appeasement as a way to prevent such a conflict, with neither wanting to choose between British loyalty and addressing anti-British sentiment at home. The Chanak Crisis in 1922 had already alerted Britain that Dominion backing was not guaranteed. Given the pivotal role of the Dominions in the 1918 victory, Britain was wary of engaging in another major war without their support.

The British Foreign Office for its part expressed a great deal of frustration over Hitler's action in unilaterally taking what London had proposed to negotiate. As a Foreign Office memo complained: "Hitler has deprived us of the possibility of making to him a concession which might otherwise have been a useful bargaining counter in our hands in the general negotiations with Germany which we had it in contemplation to initiate". The Rhineland crisis completed the estrangement between Eden who believed that Hitler's proposals in his speech of 7 March were the grounds for a "general settlement" with Germany, and Vansittart who argued that Hitler was negotiating in bad faith. Eden and Vansittart had already clashed during the Abyssinia Crisis with Eden supporting sanctions against Italy while Vansittart wanted Italy as an ally against Germany. Vansittart argued that there was no prospect of a "general settlement" with Hitler, and the best that could be done was to strengthen ties with the French in order to confront Germany. The Germanophobe Vansittart had always hated the Germans, and especially disliked the Nazis, whom he saw as a menace to civilisation. Vansittart had supported Eden's efforts to defuse the Rhineland crisis as British rearmament had only just began, but being an intense Francophile Vansittart urged the government to use the crisis as a chance to begin forming a military alliance with France against Germany. By the spring of 1936, Vansittart had become convinced that a "general settlement" with Germany was not possible, and Hitler was seeking the conquest of the world. A Foreign Office official Owen O'Malley suggested that Britain give Germany a "free hand in the East" (i.e. accept the German conquest of all Eastern Europe) in exchange for a German promise to accept the status quo in Western Europe. Vansittart wrote in response that Hitler was seeking world conquest, and that to allow Germany to conquer all of Eastern Europe would give the Reich sufficient raw materials to make Germany immune to a British blockade, which would then allow the Germans to overrun Western Europe. Vansittart commented that to allow Germany to conquer Eastern Europe would "lead to the disappearance of liberty and democracy in Europe". By contrast, Eden saw British interests as confined only to Western Europe, and did not share Vansittart's beliefs about what Hitler's ultimate intentions might be. Nor did Eden, the rest of the Cabinet or the majority of the British people share Vansittart's conviction that Britain could not afford to be indifferent about Eastern Europe.

Though the British had agreed to staff talks with the French as the price of French "restraint", many British ministers were unhappy with these talks. Home Secretary John Simon wrote to Eden and Baldwin that staff talks to be held with the French after the Rhineland remilitarisation would lead the French to perceive that:

"they have got us so tied that they can safely wait for the breakdown of discussions with Germany. In such circumstances France will be as selfish and as pig-headed as France has always been and the prospect of agreement with Germany will grow dimmer and dimmer".

In response to objections like Simon's, the British ended the staff talks with the French five days after they had begun; Anglo-French staff talks were not to occur again until February 1939 in the aftermath of the Dutch War Scare of January 1939. Besides opposition within the cabinet, the Anglo-French staff talks generated furious criticism from David Lloyd George and the Beaverbrook and Rothermere press who fumed, as the Daily Mail put it in a leader, over "military arrangements that will commit us to some war at the call of others". Furthermore, Hitler's Extraordinary Ambassador-at-Large Joachim von Ribbentrop had warned Baldwin and Eden that Germany regarded the Anglo-French staff talks as a mortal threat, and any hope of a "general settlement" with Germany would end forever if the talks continued. However, the rather hazily phrased British statement linking British security to French sécurité was not disallowed out of the fear that it would irreparably damage Anglo-French relations, which as the British historian A. J. P. Taylor observed, meant should France become involved in a war with Germany, there would be at a minimum a strong moral case because of the statement of March 19, 1936, for Britain to fight on the side of France.

Until the statement by Neville Chamberlain on March 31, 1939, offering the "guarantee" of Poland, there were no British security commitments in Eastern Europe beyond the Covenant of the League of Nations. However, because of the French alliance system in Eastern Europe, the so-called Cordon sanitaire, any German attack on France's Eastern European allies would cause a Franco-German war, and because of the statement of March 19, 1936, a Franco-German war would create strong pressure for British intervention on the side of France. This was all the more the case because unlike the Locarno Treaties, where Britain was committed to come to France's defence only in the event of a German attack, the British statement of March 19 as part of an effort to be as vague as possible only stated Britain considered French security to be a vital national need, and did not distinguish between a German attack on France vs. France going to war with Germany in the event of a German attack on a member of the cordon sanitarie. Thus, in this way, the British statement of March 1936 offered not only a direct British commitment to defend France (albeit phrased in exceedingly ambiguous language), but also indirectly to the Eastern European states of the cordon sanitaire. In this way, the British government found itself drawn into the Central European crisis of 1938 because the Franco-Czechoslovak alliance of 1924 meant any German-Czechoslovak war would automatically become a Franco-German war. It was because of this indirect security commitment that the British involved themselves in the Central European crisis of 1938, despite the widespread feeling that the German-Czechoslovak dispute did not concern Britain directly.

During a House of Commons Foreign Affairs Select Committee meeting on 12 March, Winston Churchill, a backbench Conservative MP, argued for Anglo-French co-ordination under the League of Nations to help France challenge the remilitarisation of the Rhineland, but this never happened. On 6 April Churchill said of the remilitarisation, "The creation of a line of forts opposite to the French frontier will enable the German troops to be economised on that line and will enable the main forces to swing round through Belgium and Holland", accurately predicting the Battle of France.

=== Belgium ===
Belgium concluded an alliance with France in 1920 but after the remilitarisation Belgium opted again for neutrality. On 14 October 1936 King Leopold III of Belgium said in a speech:

"The reoccupation of the Rhineland, by ending the Locarno arrangement, has almost brought us back to our international position before the war... We must follow a policy exclusively and entirely Belgian. The policy must aim solely at placing us outside the quarrels of our neighbors".

Since the leaders of Germany knew well that neither Britain nor France would violate Belgian neutrality, the declaration of Belgian neutrality effectively meant that there was no more danger of an Allied offensive in the West in the event of another Franco-German war, as the Germans were now busily constructing the Siegfried Line along their border with France. By contrast, just as before and during 1914, Germany's leaders were all too willing to violate Belgian neutrality.

=== Poland ===
Poland, announced that the Franco-Polish Military Alliance signed in 1921 would be honoured, although the treaty stipulated that Poland would aid France only if France was invaded. At the same time that Józef Beck, as Poland's Minister of Foreign Affairs, was assuring the French ambassador Léon Noël of his commitment to the Franco-Polish alliance and Poland's willingness to stand with France, he was also telling the German ambassador Count Hans-Adolf von Moltke that since Germany was not planning on invading France, the Franco-Polish alliance would not come into effect and Poland would do nothing if France acted. Beck made a point of stressing to Moltke that Poland had not been allowed to sign Locarno and would not go to war for Locarno, and that as one of the architects of the German-Polish nonaggression pact of 1934 that he was a friend of the Reich. Beck told Moltke on 9 March that his promise to go to war with France was "in practice, without effect" because it only came into effect if German troops entered France. Weinberg wrote that Beck's "duplicity" during the Rhineland crisis of telling the German and French ambassadors different things about what Poland would do "... did nothing for Beck's personal reputation and involved enormous risks ..." for Poland. Poland did agree to mobilise its forces if France did first, however they abstained from voting against the remilitarisation in the Council of the League of Nations.

=== United States ===
During the Rhineland crisis, the isolationist American government took a strict "hands off" policy of doing nothing. During the crisis, President Franklin D. Roosevelt went off on a "diplomatically convenient" extended fishing trip to Florida to avoid having to answer questions from journalists about what his administration planned to do in response to the crisis in Europe. The general sentiment within the U.S. government was expressed by Truman Smith, the American military attaché in Berlin who wrote that Hitler was seeking only to end French domination in Europe, and was not seeking to destroy France as a power. Smith's report concluded: "Versailles is dead. There may possibly be a German catastrophe and a new Versailles, but it will not be the Versailles which has hung like a dark cloud over Europe since 1920".

=== The Soviet Union ===
In public, the Soviet government took a strong line in denouncing the German coup as a threat to peace. At the same time the Soviet Foreign Commissar Maxim Litvinov was giving speeches before the Assembly of the League of Nations praising collective security and urging the world to oppose Hitler's coup, Soviet diplomats in Berlin were telling their counterparts at the Auswärtiges Amt of their desire for better commercial relations, which in turn might lead to better political relations. Just after the remilitarisation, the Soviet premier Vyacheslav Molotov gave an interview with the Swiss newspaper Le Temps hinting that the Soviet Union wanted better relations with Germany. In April 1936, the Soviet Union signed a commercial treaty with Germany providing for expanded German-Soviet trade. A major problem for the Soviet Union to go to war with Germany was the lack of a common German-Soviet frontier, which would require both the Polish and Romanian governments to grant transit right to the Red Army. Despite their professed willingness to engage with the Wehrmacht, the Narkomindel tended to negotiate with the Poles and the Romanians over transit rights in the event of a war in such a manner to suggest that they wanted the talks to fail, suggesting that the Soviet hard line against Germany was just posturing. The Romanians and even more so the Poles expressed a great deal of fear that if the Red Army were allowed transit rights to enter their countries on the way to fight Germany that they would fail to leave once the war was over; the Narkomindel failed to provide convincing reassurances on that point.

=== League of Nations ===
When the Council of the League of Nations met in London, the only delegate in favour of sanctions against Germany was Maxim Litvinov, the representative of the Soviet Union. Though Germany was no longer a member of the League, Ribbentrop was allowed to give a speech before the League Assembly on 19 March where he tried to justify Germany's actions as something imposed on the Reich by the Franco-Soviet pact, and warned that there would be serious economic consequences for those states who voted to impose sanctions on Germany. By 1936, a number of Eastern European, Scandinavian and Latin American countries whose economies were hard-pressed by the Great Depression had become very dependent upon trade with Germany to keep their economies afloat, which meant for economic reasons alone none of those states wished to offend Germany. President Federico Páez of Ecuador gave a speech in which he declared the idea of sanctions against the Reich to be "nonsensical". At the time, the British Foreign Office estimated that Britain, France, Romania, Belgium, Czechoslovakia and the Soviet Union were the only nations in the entire world willing to impose sanctions on Germany. The Swedish, Danish, Norwegian, Polish, Dutch, Greek, Swiss, Turkish, Chilean, Estonian, Portuguese, Spanish, and Finnish ambassadors to the League all let it be known that they regarded sanctions on Germany as "economic suicide" for their countries. Mussolini, who was still angry with the League sanctions applied against Italy, made a speech in which he made it clear that he definitely would not be joining any sanctions against Germany for remilitarizing the Rhineland. In the fall of 1935, Britain had been able to have the League impose limited sanctions on Italy, but by the later winter of 1936, the idea of imposing sweeping sanctions on Germany—whose economy was four times the size of Italy's, making Germany an "economic octopus" whose tentacles were everywhere around the world—was unthinkable for rest of the world. Moreover, for the sanctions to work, the United States had to join in. In 1935, the American government had declared that as the U.S. was not a League member, it would not abide by the League sanctions on Italy, which was hardly a hopeful precedent for the idea that U.S. would join in with imposing sanctions on Germany. Argentina declared that it would vote for sanctions against Germany only if the United States promised to join in. The Council declared, though not unanimously, that the remilitarisation constituted a breach of the Treaties of Versailles and Locarno. Hitler was invited to plan a new scheme for European security, and he responded by claiming he had "no territorial claims in Europe" and wanted a 25-year pact of non-aggression with Britain and France. However, when the British Government inquired further into this proposed pact, they did not receive a reply.

== Aftermath ==
The remilitarisation changed the balance of power decisively toward Germany. France's credibility in standing against German expansion or aggression was left in doubt. France's military strategy was entirely defensive and lacked the slightest intention of invading Germany but planned to defend the Maginot Line. France's failure to send even a single unit into the Rhineland showed that strategy to the rest of Europe.

Potential allies in Eastern Europe could no longer trust an alliance with France, which could not be trusted to deter Germany through the threat of an invasion, and without such a deterrence, allies would be militarily helpless.

Belgium dropped its defensive alliance with France and returned to its reliance on neutrality during a war. France's neglect to expand the Maginot Line to cover the Belgian border allowed Germany to invade precisely there in 1940.

Mussolini had pushed back against German expansion, but since he now realised co-operation with France to be unpromising, he began to swing toward Germany. All of France's allies were disappointed, and even Pope Pius XI told the French ambassador, "Had you ordered the immediate advance of 200,000 men into the zone the Germans had occupied, you would have done everyone a very great favour".

With the Rhineland remilitarised, Germany started the construction of the Siegfried Line, which meant that if Germany attacked any of the states in the cordon sanitaire, the ability of France to threaten an invasion was now limited. Such was the impact of the remilitarisation on the balance of power that Czechoslovak President Edvard Beneš even seriously considered renouncing the alliance with France and to seek a rapprochement with Germany. He abandoned that idea only after it had become clear that the price of a rapprochement would be the effective loss of Czechoslovak independence.

Likewise, King Carol II of Romania concluded that Romania might have to abandon its alliance with France and accept that his country could potentially move from the French to the German sphere of influence.

When William Christian Bullitt, Jr., newly appointed as American ambassador to France, visited Germany in May 1936 and met with Baron von Neurath there. On 18 May 1936, Bullitt reported to President Franklin Roosevelt:

"Von Neurath said that it was the policy of the German government to do nothing active in foreign affairs until 'the Rhineland had been digested'. He explained that he meant that until the German fortifications had been constructed on the French and Belgian borders, the German government would do everything possible to prevent rather than encourage an outbreak by Nazis in Austria and would pursue a quiet line with regard to Czechoslovakia. 'As soon as our fortifications are constructed and the countries of Central Europe realize that France cannot enter German territory at will, all those countries will begin to feel very differently about their foreign policies and a new constellation will develop', he said".

From 15 to 20 June 1936, the chiefs of staff of the Little Entente of Czechoslovakia, Romania and Yugoslavia met to discuss the changed international situation. They decided to maintain their present plans for a war with Hungary but concluded that with the Rhineland now remilitarised, there was little hope of effective French action in the event of a war against Germany. The meeting ended with the conclusion that there now were only two great powers in Eastern Europe (Germany and the Soviet Union), and the best that could be hoped for was to avoid another war, which would almost certainly mean the loss of their small nations' independence, regardless of the winner.

Weinberg wrote that attitude of the entire German elite and much of the German people was that any new war would only benefit Germany and that ending the Rhineland's demilitarised status could be only a good thing by opening the door to starting a new war. He considered the attitude was extremely short-sighted, self-destructive and stupid, even from a narrowly-German viewpoint. Weinberg noted that Germany had lost its independence in 1945 and far more territory under the Oder-Neisse Line, which was imposed that year, than it ever had under Versailles. Together with its millions killed and the destruction of its cities, he believed that from the German viewpoint, the best thing to do would have been accepting Versailles, rather than starting a new war, which ended with Germany being totally crushed, partitioned and occupied.

== References and further reading ==
- Barnett, Correlli (2002). The Collapse of British Power. London: Pan.
- Bond, Brian (1983). "The Continental Commitment In British Strategy in the 1930s". In Mommsen, Wolfgang; Kettenacker, Lothar (eds.). The Fascist Challenge and the Policy of Appeasement. London: George Allen & Unwin. pp. 197–208. ISBN 0-04-940068-1.
- Bullock, Alan (1962). Hitler: A Study in Tyranny. London: Odhams.
- Duroselle, Jean-Baptiste (2004). France and the Nazi Threat: The Collapse of French Diplomacy 1932–1939. New York: Enigma Books. ISBN 1929631154.
- Emmerson, J. T. (1977). The Rhineland Crisis 7 March 1936: A Study in Multilateral Diplomacy. Ames: Iowa State University Press.
- Evans, Richard J. (2012). The Third Reich in Power, 1933–1939: How the Nazis Won Over the Hearts and Minds of a Nation. Penguin Books.
- Gilbert, Martin (2000). Churchill: A Life. London: Pimlico.
- Gilbert, Martin; Gott, Richard (2000). The Appeasers. London: Phoenix Press.
- Henderson, S. N. (1992). "Hitler and the Rhineland, 1936". History Today. 42 (10): 15–21.
- Heinemann, John (1979). Hitler's First Foreign Minister: Konstantin Freiherr von Neurath, Diplomat and Statesman. Berkeley: University of California Press. ISBN 0-520-03442-2.
- Hochman, Jiri (1984). The Soviet Union and the Failure of Collective Security 1934–1938.
- Hyde, Charles Cheney (1937). "Belgium and Neutrality". The American Journal of International Law. 31 (1): 81–85.
- Kershaw, Ian (1998). Hitler: 1889–1936: Hubris. New York: Norton. ISBN 978-0393320350.
- Kershaw, Ian (2000). The Nazi Dictatorship: Problems and Perspectives of Interpretation. London: Arnold.
- Mack Smith, Denis (1983). "Appeasement as a Factor in Mussolini's Foreign Policy". In Mommsen, Wolfgang; Kettenacker, Lothar (eds.). The Fascist Challenge and the Policy of Appeasement. London: George Allen & Unwin.
- Medlicott, W. N. (1969). Britain and Germany: The Search for Agreement 1930–1937. London: Athlone Press.
- Nicolson, Harold (2004). The Harold Nicolson Diaries: 1919–1964. London: Weidenfeld & Nicolson.
- Offner, Arnold (1983). "The United States and National Socialist Germany". In Mommsen, Wolfgang; Kettenacker, Lothar (eds.). The Fascist Challenge and the Policy of Appeasement. London: George Allen & Unwin. pp. 413–427.
- Parker, R. A. C. (1956). "The First Capitulation: France and the Rhineland Crisis of 1936". World Politics. 8 (3): 355–373.
- Parker, R. A. C. (1997). "Alternatives to Appeasement". In Patrick Finney (ed.). The Origins of the Second World War. London: Edward Arnold. pp. 206–221.
- Ripsman, Norrin M.; Levy, Jack S. (2007). "The Preventive War That Never Happened: Britain, France, and the Rise of Germany in the 1930s" (PDF). Security Studies. 16 (1): 32–67.
- Roi, Michael Lawrence (1997). Alternative to Appeasement: Sir Robert Vansittart and Alliance Diplomacy, 1934–1937. Westport: Greenwood.
- Schuker, Stephen (1997). "France and the Remilitarization of the Rhineland, 1936". In Patrick Finney (ed.). The Origins of the Second World War. London: Arnold Press. pp. 206–221. ISBN 0-340-67640-X.
- Schuker, Stephen (1999). "The End of Versailles". In Gordon Martel (ed.). The Origins of the Second World War Reconsidered: A. J. P. Taylor And The Historians. London: Routledge. pp. 38–56.
- Shirer, William L. (1960). The Rise and Fall of the Third Reich. New York: Viking.
- Shore, Zach (1999). "Hitler, Intelligence and the Decision to Remilitarize the Rhine". Journal of Contemporary History. 34 (1): 5–18.
- Taylor, A. J. P. (1976). The Origins of the Second World War. London: Penguin.
- Toynbee, Arnold J. (1937). Survey of International Affairs: 1935, Volume I. pp. 352–369.
- Watt, D. C. (1956). "The Reoccupation of the Rhineland". History Today. 6 (4): 244–251.
- Weinberg, Gerhard (1970). The Foreign Policy of Hitler's Germany: Diplomatic Revolution in Europe 1933–36. Chicago: University of Chicago Press.
- Weinberg, Gerhard (2013). Hitler's Foreign Policy 1933–1939: The Road to World War II. New York: Enigma Books.
- Young, Robert J. (1978). In Command of France; French Foreign Policy and Military Planning, 1933–1940. Cambridge: Harvard University Press. ISBN 0-674-44536-8.
- Young, Robert (1996). France and the Origins of the Second World War. New York: St. Martin's Press. ISBN 0312161867.
