= Wilhelm Heine =

German-American soldier, writer and artist

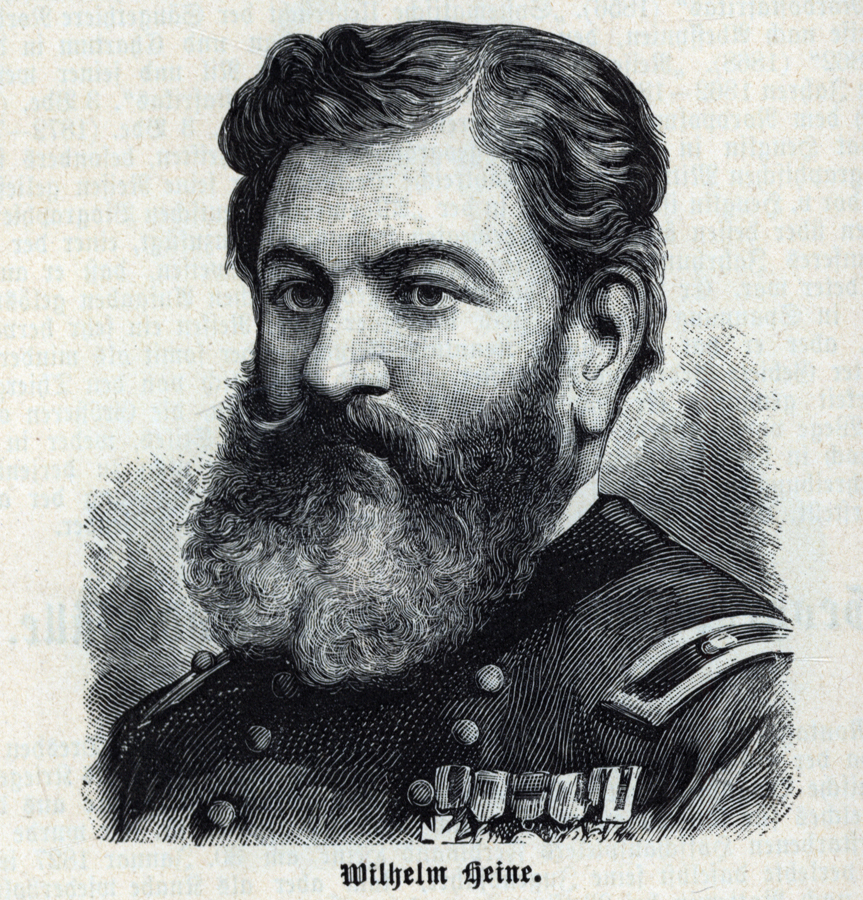
Portrait of Wilhelm Heine from 1886

Peter Bernhard Wilhelm Heine, better known as Wilhelm (or William) Heine (January 30, 1827 – October 5, 1885) was a German-American artist, world traveller and writer as well as an officer during the American Civil War.

== Early life and education ==
Heine was born in Dresden, the son of Ferdinand Heine, a comedian engaged at the Dresden Court Theatre. His family connections included composer Richard Wagner, whose father had been a family friend.

Heine studied at the Royal Academy of Art in Dresden and in the studio of Julius Hübner. Then he continued his artistic studies for three years in Paris. He returned to Dresden getting work as a scene designer for the court theatre and giving painting classes. He fled to New York in 1849, following the suppression of the May Uprising in Dresden in which he participated. In this he was aided by Alexander von Humboldt.

== Career ==
He set up his artist studio at 515 Broadway, and soon established his reputation as an artist. After meeting the archaeologist and diplomat, Ephraim George Squier, Heine was invited to accompany him, as an artist, on his consular duties to Central America. Proceeding ahead of Squier, he collected and recorded indigenous plants and animals and compiled notes for future publications. Until Squier arrived, Heine stood in as consul, negotiating a commercial agreement between the Central American countries and the United States, which he delivered to Washington. The record of this expedition was published in 1853 as the Wanderbilder aus Zentralamerika. While in Washington, he met President Millard Fillmore and Commodore Matthew Perry, and was selected from among several scores of applicants for the post of official artist to the Perry expedition to Japan.

=== Japan ===
Nominally attached to Perry's expedition as an Acting Master's Mate; he served on the flagship USS Mississippi under Sydney Smith Lee. Heine visited Okinawa, the Bonin Islands, Yokohama, Shimoda and Hakodate during 1853 and 1854 (Edo, however, remained closed to the members of the American expedition, and Heine was not to visit the city until 1860, when he returned to Japan as a member of the Prussian Expedition). The sketches he produced of the places he visited and the people he encountered there, together with the daguerreotypes taken by his colleague Eliphalet Brown Jr., formed the basis of an official iconography of the American expedition to Japan which remains an important record of the country as it was before the foreigners arrived in force.

Upon his return to New York in 1855 he published several books: a collection of prints entitled Graphic Scenes of the Japan Expedition; 400 sketches which were included in Perry's official report; and his memoirs, Reise um die Welt nach Japan (Leipzig, 1856). The memoirs were very successful, and were immediately translated into both French and Dutch.

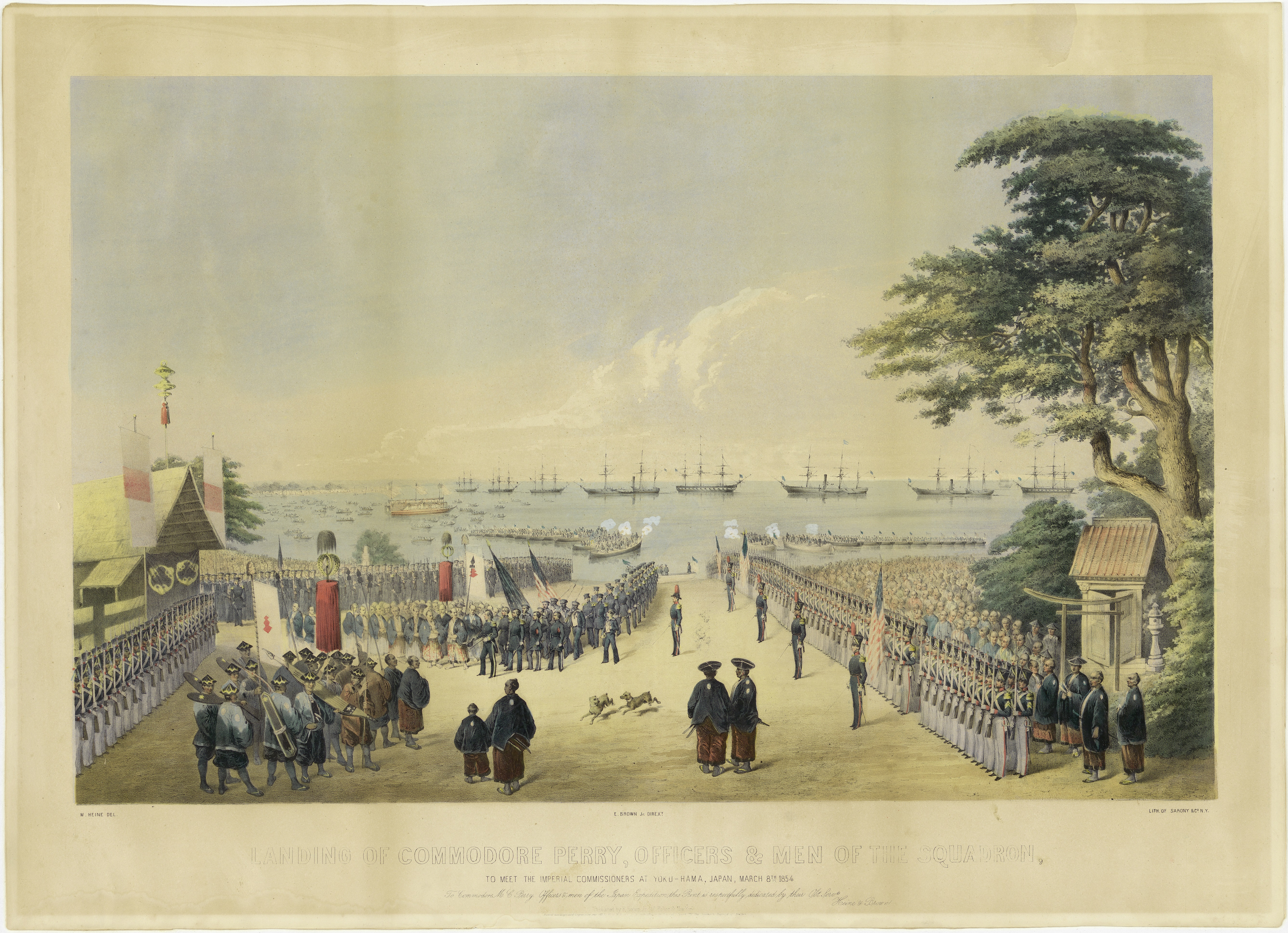
"Commodore Matthew C. Perry's visit of Kanagawa"

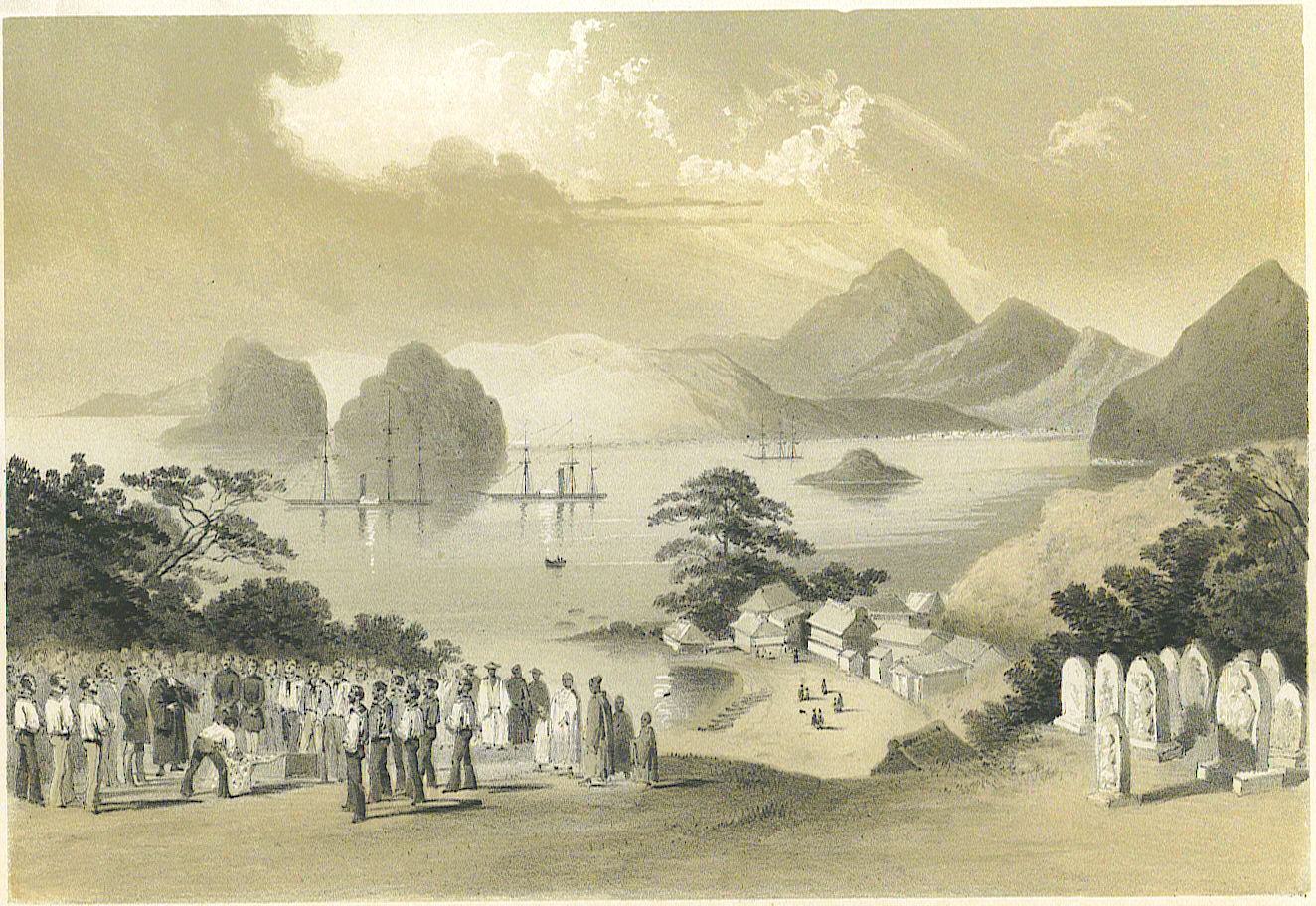
"Shimoda as seen from the American Grave Yard" looking towards the harbor (lithograph, 1856).

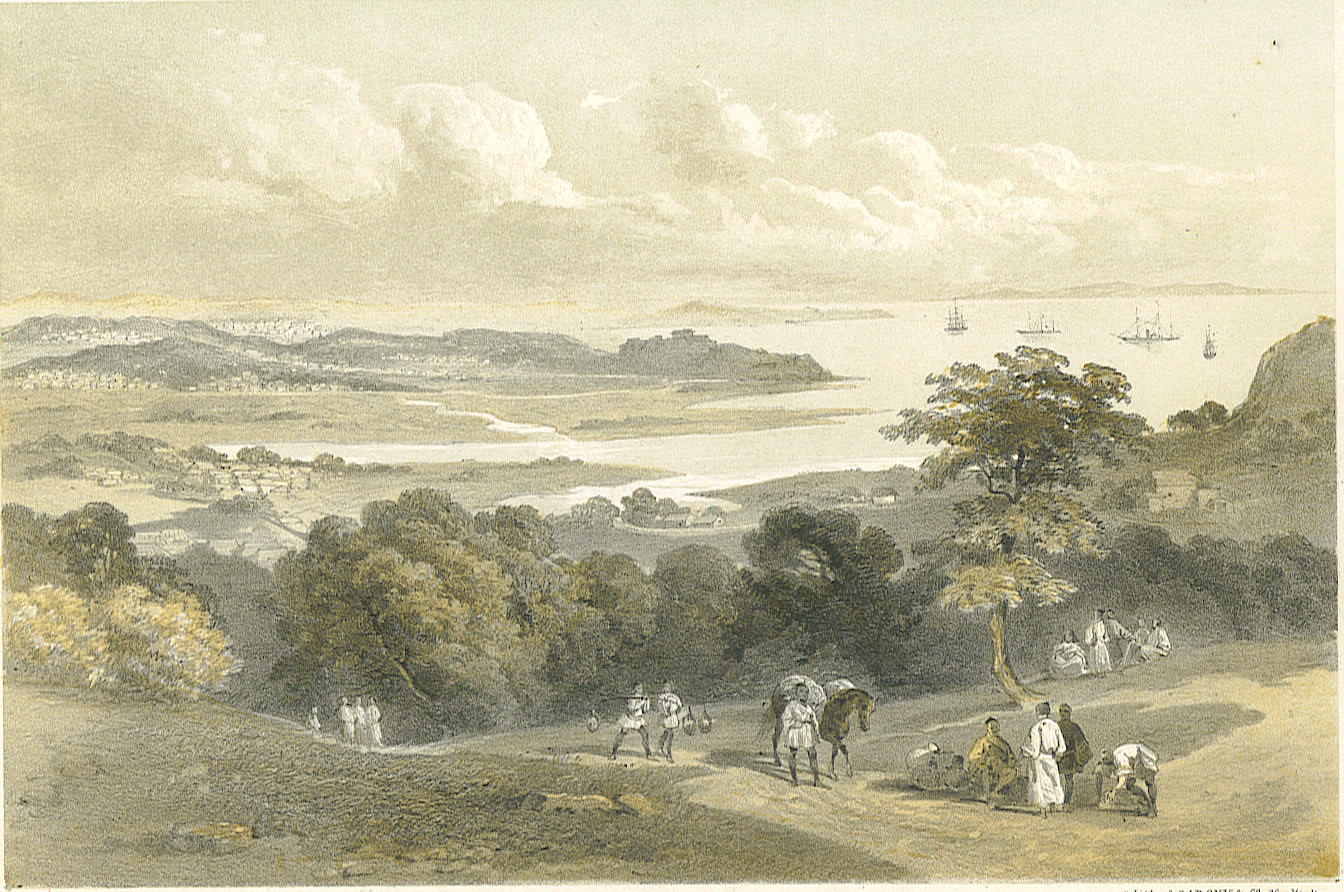
"Napha from Bamboo Village" looking towards the seashore (lithograph, 1856).

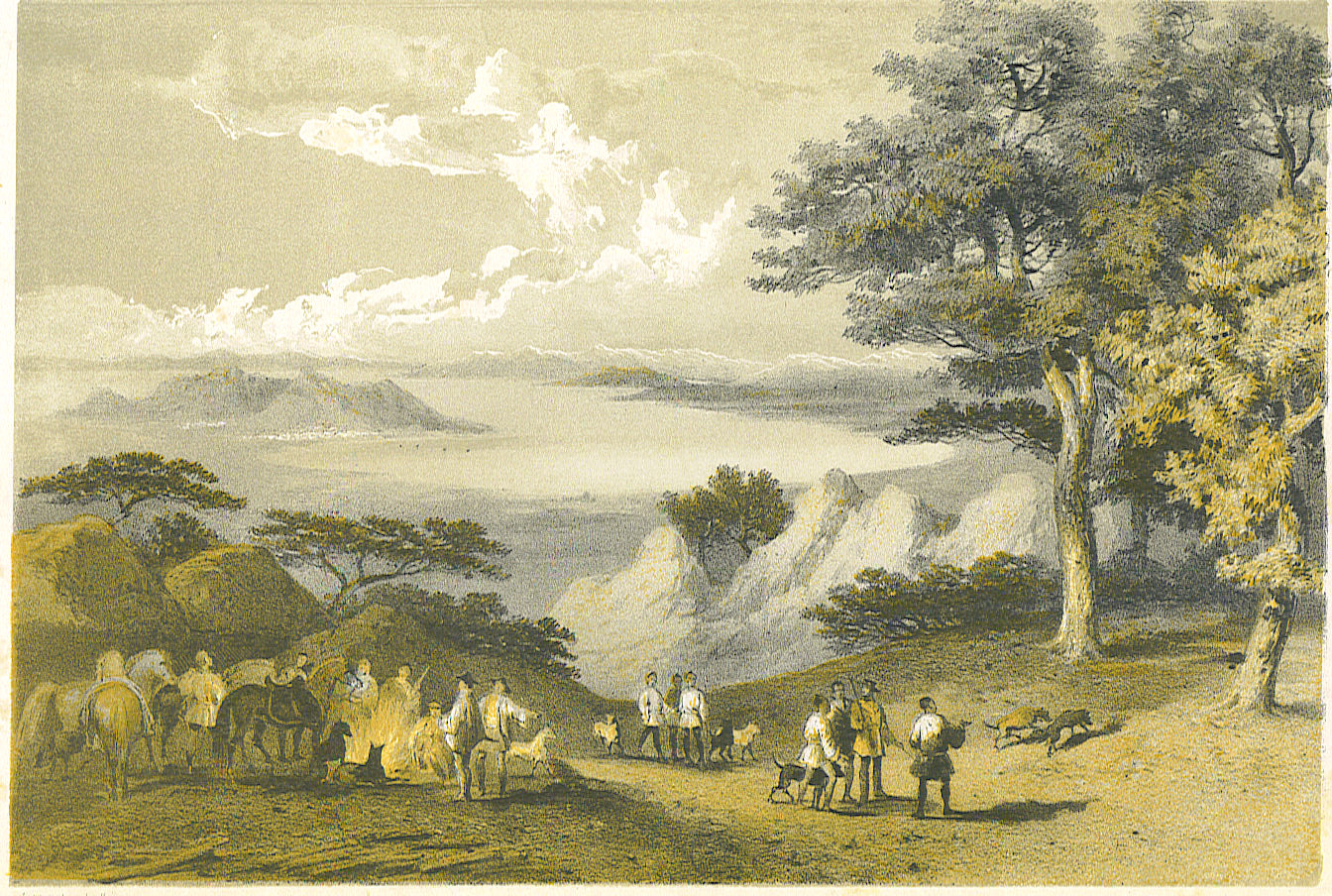
"View of Hakodate from Snow Peak" looking towards the sea (lithograph, 1856).

=== Further expeditions ===
Going back to Prussia he published a German translation of the report of the Rodgers Expedition sent by the US government to Japan, China and Okhotsk Seas, under the title Die Expedition in die Seen von China, Japan und Okhotsk (Leipzig, 1858-9) and Japan und Seine Bewohner (Leipzig, 1860). Here he urged the Prussian government to send more expeditions to Asia before the Americans became established there. This was taken up and while in Berlin he received an invitation to join the Eulenberg Expedition as official artist once again, and was simultaneously given a premium to send back reports for a Köln newspaper. During this trip he met up with Mikhail Bakunin in Yokohama, who was in the process of returning to Europe, following his escape from Siberia. Eventually, in 1864, he published his major work, a voluminous book on travel in the Orient, Eine Weltreise um die nördliche Hemisphäre in Verbindung mit der Ostasiatischen Expedition in den Jahren 1860 und 1861 (Leipzig, two volumes).

=== American Civil War and later life ===
Learning of the outbreak of the American Civil War; the Forty-Eighter returned and volunteered for the Union Army. He joined the 1st Maryland Infantry Regiment before being commissioned a Captain of Topographical Engineers. Serving in the Army of the Potomac, Heine was captured during the Peninsula Campaign and briefly was in Libby Prison before being exchanged. In late 1862 he was arrested and accused of revealing too much information of the Union defenses in his drawings. Also being wounded he was honorably discharged as "unfit for service." In 1863 he rejoined the army as Colonel of the 103rd New York Infantry, a regiment made up mainly of German-Americans. Later he commanded a brigade and then a small division in the Army of West Virginia. In 1865 he was made a Brevet Brigadier General but was accused of disobedience and left the army. In the next year he became a U.S. clerk to the Paris and Liverpool consulates. After the establishment of the Hohenzollern Empire in Germany in 1871, he returned to Dresden where he wrote his last book about Japan, Japan, Beiträge zur Kenntnis des Landes und seiner Bewohner (Berlin, 1873–80) and died in Lößnitz.

== Personal life ==
Heine married Katherine Whetton Sedgwick (b. 1824 in Albany/N.Y.; d. 1859 in Berlin), a cousin of general John Sedgwick (1813–1864). His daughter Katharina Wilhelmina Heine (1859–1945) married Edgar Hanfstaengl, one of their five children was Ernst Hanfstaengl, a former associate of Adolf Hitler.

== Selected works ==
- 1856 -- Graphic Scenes in the Japan Expedition. New York: G. P. Putnam & Company. OCLC 3095611 Includes ten metal-plate illustrations: (1) Portrait of Commodore M.C. Perry;(2) Macao from Penha Hill; (3) Pagoda of Whampoa; (4) Old China Street in Canton; (5) Kung-Twa, at On-Na, Lew Chew; (6) Mia, or road-side chapel, at Yoku-Hama; (7) Temple at Ben-Teng, in the Harbor of Simoda; (8) Street and bridge at Simoda; (9) Temple of Ha-Tshu-Man-Ya Tschu-Ro, at Simoda; (10) Grave-yard at the Simoda, Dio Zenge.
- 1856 -- Reise um die Erde nach Japan an Bord der Expeditions-Escadron unter Com. Perry den Jahren 1853, 54, und 55, unternommen im Auftrage der Regierung der Vereinigten Staaten. Leipzig: Hermann Costenoble.
- 1857 -- Wanderbilder aus Central-Amerika: Skizzen eines deutschen Malers (Walking pictures from cent ral America: Sketches of a German Painter) Leipzig: Hermann Costenoble. OCLC 245831358
- 1864 -- Eine Weltreise um die nördliche Hemisphäre in Verbindung mit der Ostasiatischen Expedition in den Jahren 1860 und 1861 (A voyage round the world around the Northern Hemisphere in Connection with the East Asian Expedition, 1860-1861). Leipzig: F.A. Brockhaus. OCLC 63836384
- 1865 -- Treasury of Travel and Adventure in North and South America, Europe, Asia and Africa: A Book for Young and Old. New York: D. Appleton and Company. OCLC 48859643
- 1871 -- Japan, Beiträge zur Kenntnis des Landes und seiner Bewohner (Japan, contribution to the knowledge of the country and its inhabitants). Berlin: P. Bette. OCLC 82741141
