= Edgar Hanfstaengl =

German commercial purchaser & art publisher (1842–1910)

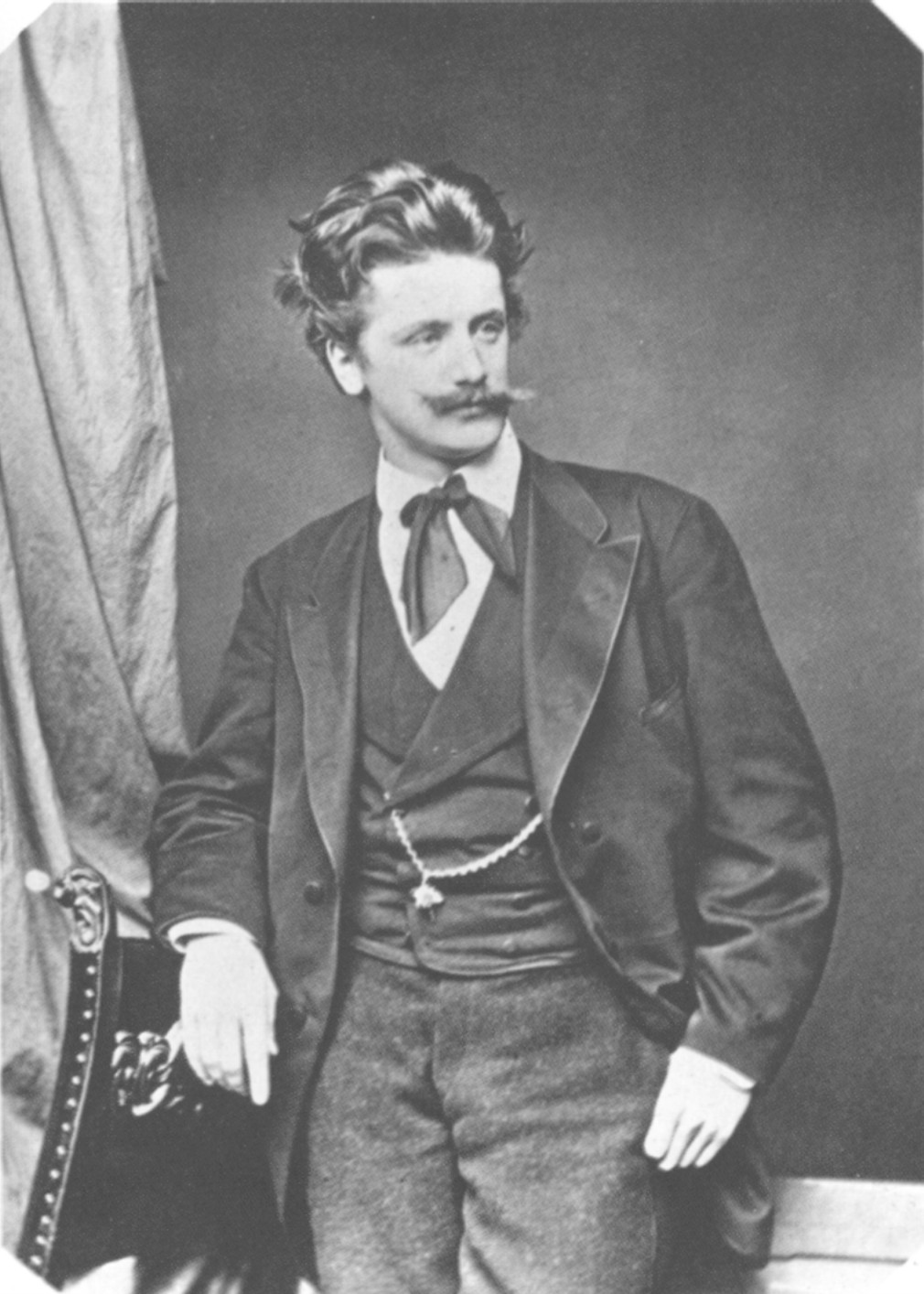
Photograph of Edgar Hanfstaengl

Edgar Hanfstaengl (15 July 1842 – 28 May 1910) was a chief clerk, commercial purchaser and art publisher. He was significantly the son of a famous Bavarian court photographer who was connected with the circle of Ludwig II and became a close confidant of Duchess Sophie in Bavaria. He was also the father of the political figure Ernst Hanfstaengl.

== Origins and young life ==
Edgar Hanfstaengl was born and died in Munich. He was the son of the photographer Franz Hanfstaengl (1804–1877) and his first wife Franziska Wegmeier (1809–1860). Edgar completed a training as commercial purchaser in Stettin and with a London wholesaler. At the beginning of the 1860s Edgar set out for Asia, to work as financial clerk to the Clark Tea Wholesaler's Company. In 1867 he returned to Munich to his father's Art business, where he was put to work as head clerk. In the same year he embarked upon a love-affair with the fiancée of Ludwig II of Bavaria, Duchess Sophie in Bavaria. On 12 November 1868 Edgar took over the photographic workshop and expanded the business to the Franz Hanfstaengl Art Publishing House.

== Bavarian intrigue ==
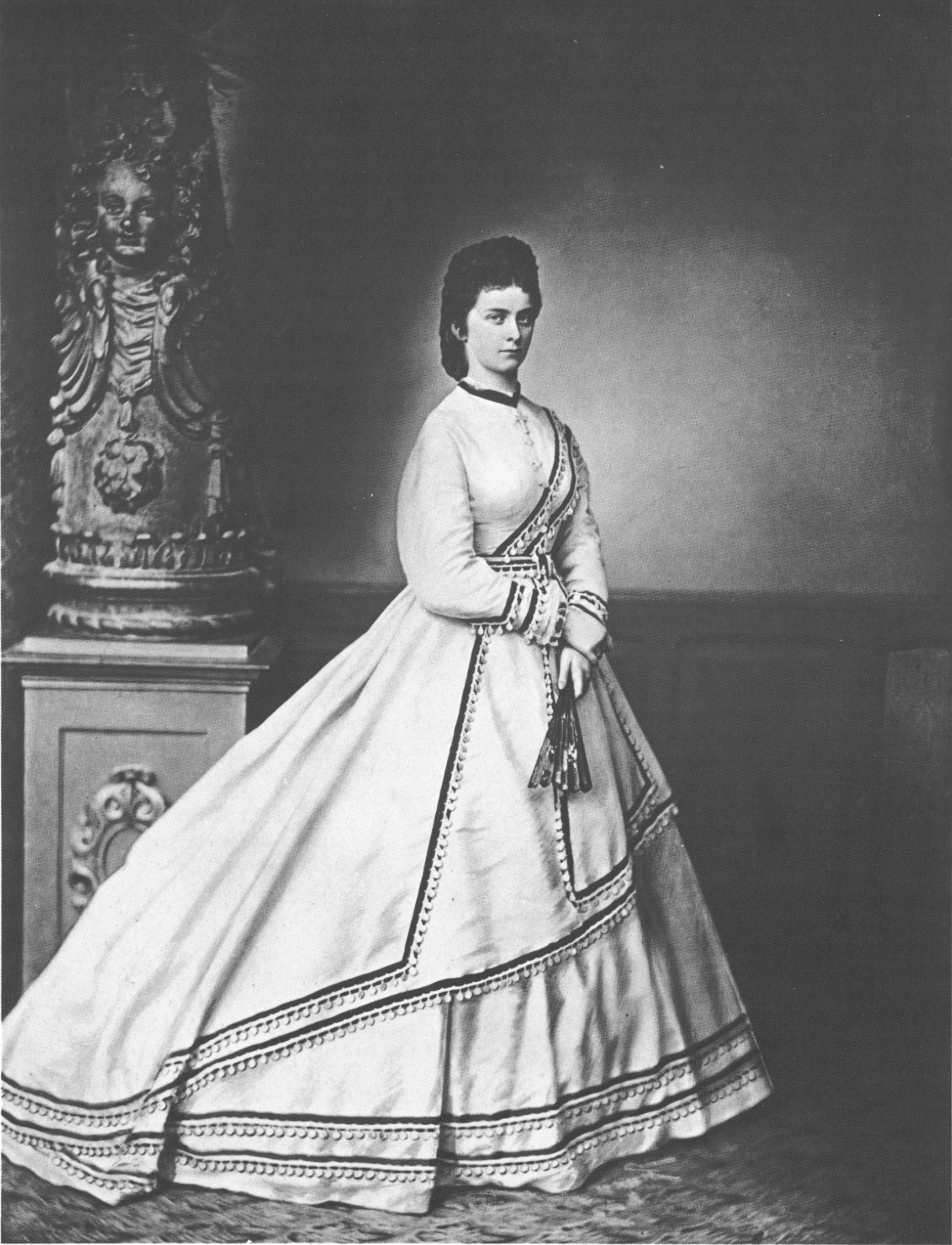
Sophie Charlotte in Bavaria

The engagement between Duchess Sophie and King Ludwig II was arranged at the behest of her father Duke Max Josef, even though the King, considering his own distinctly homosexual character, was concerned that she would not be happy in the union. The engagement was agreed upon on 22 January 1867. Three days later Sophie met Edgar in his father's photographic studio, where he had recently arrived as senior clerk after his travels abroad. Possibly they had known each other since childhood, when Franz Hanfstaengl was a readily welcomed guest in the artistic circle of Duke Max.

The many photographs of the royal bride which then had to be prepared, and additional work which brought Edgar regularly to Possenhofen Castle, brought them more closely together and they fell in love. Their meetings, attended by the utmost secrecy, occurred in the Pähl Castle, the Palace in Munich, and even at Possenhofen. Five love-letters, which Sophie Charlotte wrote to Edgar Hanfstaengl between July and September 1867, have been preserved. After repeating postponements, the wedding was called off by Ludwig II in October.

== Later life ==
Edgar was not able to make up his mind to marry, until 1882. Edgar's wife, the Berlin-born Katharina Wilhelmina Heine (1859–1945), was the daughter of German artist and Brevet Brigadier General of the Union Army Wilhelm Heine and his spouse Katherine Whetton Sedgwick (Albany/N.Y.1824-Berlin 1859) and related to Civil War (1861-1865) general John Sedgwick (1813-1864).

The couple had 5 children: Edgar (1883–1958), Egon (1884–1915), Erna (1885–1981), Ernst ("Putzi") (1887–1975) and Erwin (1888–1914). The eldest son Edgar from 1907 took control of his father's Art business. Edgar's only daughter Erna found, after her father's death, an envelope with the hand-written endorsement by her father: "Letters of Princess Sophie Charlotte - burn these unread. Edgar." Erna did not carry out her father's wishes, but instead handed over the letters in February 1980 to the author Heinz Gebhardt, in order 'once (for all) to set the record straight' and he published details of the affair with excerpts from the correspondence in his history of the Hanfstaengel family business.

Edgar Hanfstaengl, Sophie's "dear, beloved friend", died on 28 May 1910. He was buried in the old Munich south cemetery in the Hanfstaengl family plot.
