= Ernst Hanfstaengl =

German American businessman (1887–1975)

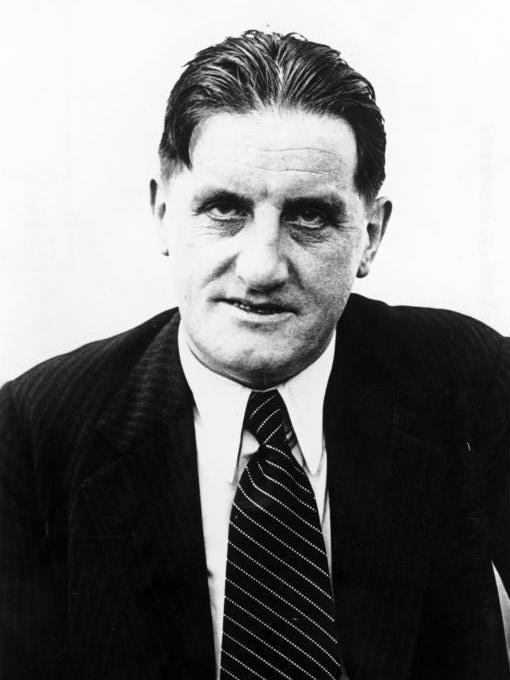
- Hanfstaengl in 1934
- Born: Ernst Franz Sedgwick Hanfstaengl; 2 February 1887; Munich, Germany
- Died: 6 November 1975 (aged 88); Munich, West Germany
- Education: Harvard University (B.A., 1909)
- Occupation: Businessman
- Known for: Being a Nazi and close friend and advisor of Adolf Hitler, and a longstanding acquaintance of Franklin D. Roosevelt, who provided information on Hitler and other Nazi figures to the United States Government during World War II
- Spouse: Helene Hanfstaengl
- Children: 2, including Egon

Ernst Franz Sedgwick Hanfstaengl (German pronunciation: [ˈɛʁnst hanfˈʃtɛŋl̩]; 2 February 1887 – 6 November 1975) was a German American businessman and close friend of Adolf Hitler. He eventually fell out of favour with Hitler and defected from Nazi Germany to the United States. He later worked for Franklin D. Roosevelt. He was once engaged to the author Djuna Barnes in the 1910s.

== Early life and education ==
Hanfstaengl, nicknamed "Putzi", (Note: A nickname (which may have been acquired in youth) meaning "little fellow"; as an adult Hanfstaengl was 1.93 metres (6 ft 4 in) tall.) was born in Munich, Bavaria, Germany, the son of a German art publisher, Edgar Hanfstaengl, and American Katharine Wilhelmina Heine, daughter of Wilhelm Heine and Katherine Whetton Sedgwick, a cousin of American Civil War Union Army general John Sedgwick. His godfather was Duke Ernst II of Saxe-Coburg and Gotha. He had an elder sister, Erna, (Note: Some authorities suggest that Hitler was romantically involved with Erna, a tall and stately woman, or had romantic affections for her. While some historians have written that Hitler was nursed by Erna (and her mother) at Uffing following the Beer Hall putsch, Toland (1976) claims that this is a myth, resulting from the misinterpretation of the US journalists who interviewed the three Hanfstaengl women (the mother, sister and wife of Ernst) immediately after Hitler's arrest by the authorities.) two elder brothers, Edgar and Egon, and a younger brother Erwine.

Hanfstaengl spent most of his early years in Germany and later moved to the United States, where he attended Harvard College and became acquainted with Walter Lippmann and John Reed. A gifted pianist, he composed several songs for Harvard's football team. He graduated in 1909.

He moved to New York City, where he took over the management of the American branch of his father's business, the Franz Hanfstaengl Fine Arts Publishing House. Many mornings he would practice on the piano at the Harvard Club of New York City, where he became acquainted with both Franklin and Theodore Roosevelt. Among his circle of acquaintances were the newspaper baron William Randolph Hearst, author Djuna Barnes, to whom he was engaged, and actor Charlie Chaplin.

At the outbreak of World War I, he asked the German military attaché in New York City, Franz von Papen, to smuggle him back to Germany. Slightly baffled by the proposal, the attaché refused, and Hanfstaengl remained in the U.S. during the war. After 1917, the American branch of the family business was confiscated as enemy property.

== Career ==
=== Admirer and confidant of Hitler ===
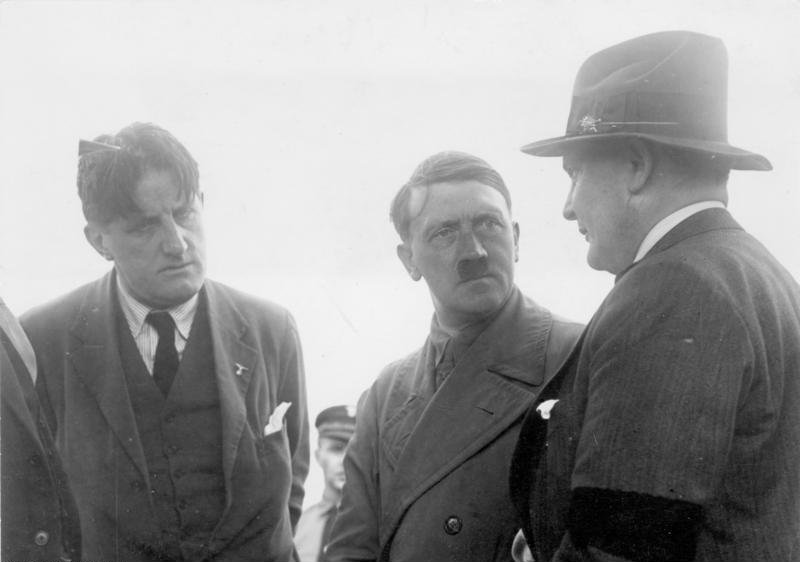
Hanfstaengl with Hitler and Hermann Göring in Berlin in 1932

Hanfstaengl with Diana Mitford at a 1934 Nazi Party rally in Nuremberg

Hanfstaengl returned to Germany in 1922. While living in his native Bavaria, he first heard Adolf Hitler speak in a Munich beer hall. (Note: The initial encounter was on 22 November 1922 at the Kindlkeller, a large L-shaped beer hall.) A fellow member of the Harvard Hasty Pudding club who worked at the U.S. Embassy asked Hanfstaengl to assist a military attaché sent to observe the political scene in Munich. Just before returning to Berlin, the attaché, Captain Truman Smith, suggested that Hanfstaengl go to a Nazi rally as a favour and report his impressions of Hitler. Hanfstaengl was so fascinated by Hitler that he soon became one of his most intimate followers, although he did not formally join the Nazi Party until 1931. "What Hitler was able to do to a crowd in 2 1/2 hours will never be repeated in 10,000 years," Hanfstaengl said. "Because of his miraculous throat construction, he was able to create a rhapsody of hysteria. In time, he became the living unknown soldier of Germany."

Hanfstaengl introduced himself to Hitler after the speech and began a close friendship and political association that would last through the 1920s and early 1930s. After participating in the failed Munich Beer Hall Putsch in 1923, Hanfstaengl briefly fled to Austria, while the injured Hitler sought refuge in Hanfstaengl's home in Uffing, outside Munich. Hanfstaengl's wife, Helene, allegedly dissuaded Hitler from committing suicide when the police came to arrest him.

For much of the 1920s, Hanfstaengl introduced Hitler to Munich high society and helped polish his image. He also helped to finance the publication of Hitler's Mein Kampf, and the NSDAP's official newspaper, the Völkischer Beobachter (People's Observer). Hitler was the godfather of Hanfstaengl's son Egon. Hanfstaengl composed both Brownshirt and Hitler Youth marches patterned after his Harvard football songs and, he later claimed, devised the chant "Sieg Heil". Included among Hanfstaengl's friends during this period were Hanns Heinz Ewers and fellow Nazi Party worker and journalist Kurt Lüdecke.

When Winston Churchill was staying at the Hotel Regina in Munich in late August 1932, Hanfstaengl introduced himself and said he could easily arrange a meeting with Hitler there since he came to the hotel every evening around five o'clock. At the time, Churchill said he had no national prejudices against Hitler and knew little of his "doctrine or record and nothing of his character."

In the course of the conversation with Hanfstaengl, Churchill asked, "Why is your chief so violent about the Jews? I can quite understand being angry with the Jews who have done wrong or who are against the country, and I understand resisting them if they try to monopolise power in any walk of life, but what is the sense of being against a man because of his birth? How can a man help how he is born?" Hanfstaengl, according to Churchill, must have relayed this to Hitler because the next day, around noon, he came to the hotel to tell Churchill that Hitler would not be coming to see him after all. In addition, Hitler may not have wanted to meet with Churchill, who was then not in power and thought to be of no importance. Churchill declined to meet with Hitler on several subsequent occasions.

During the Reichstag fire, Hanfstaengl was staying at Göring's official residence, noticed the fire, and alerted members of the Nazi Party.

=== Fall from power ===
As the Nazi Party consolidated its power, several disputes arose between Hanfstaengl and Germany's Propaganda Minister, Joseph Goebbels. In 1933, Hanfstaengl was removed from Hitler's staff. He and Helene divorced in 1936. Hanfstaengl fell completely out of Hitler's favour after he was denounced by Unity Mitford, a close friend of both the Hanfstaengls and Hitler.

In 1937, Hanfstaengl received orders to parachute into an area held by the nationalist side of the Spanish Civil War, to assist in negotiations. While on board the plane, he feared a plot on his life and learned more details about the mission from the pilot, who eventually admitted he had been ordered to drop Hanfstaengl over Republican-held territory, which would have meant almost certain death. The pilot eventually landed on a small airfield near Leipzig after claiming an engine malfunction following a brief talk with Hanfstaengl, which allowed him to escape.

A different version of the story was related by Albert Speer in his memoirs, who said that the "mission" to Spain was an elaborate practical joke, concocted by Hitler and Goebbels, designed to punish Hanfstaengl after he had displeased the Führer by making "adverse comments about the fighting spirit of the German soldiers in combat" during the Spanish Civil War. Hanfstaengl was issued sealed orders which were not to be opened until his plane was in flight, which specified that he was to be dropped in "Red Spanish territory" to work as an agent for Francisco Franco. The plane, according to Speer, was merely circling over Germany containing an increasingly disconcerted Hanfstaengl, with false location reports being given to convey the impression that the plane was drawing ever closer to Spain. After the joke had played itself out, the pilot declared he had to make an emergency landing and landed safely at Leipzig Airport. Hanfstaengl was so alarmed by the event that he defected soon afterward.

In a late 1960s interview at his home in Schwabing in Munich, Hanfstaengl said that he was convinced he was to be tossed out of the plane and parachute over northern Germany.

He made his way to Switzerland and, after securing his son Egon's release from Germany, he moved to Great Britain, where he was interned with other German nationals after the outbreak of World War II. In June 1940 he was moved to a prison camp in Canada in line with Britain's policy of moving internees out of Britain.

=== Cooperation with United States ===
In 1942, Hanfstaengl was turned over to the U.S., working for U.S. President Franklin Roosevelt's "S-Project" to gather information on approximately 400 Nazi leaders. He provided 68 pages of information on Hitler alone, including personal details of Hitler's private life. In 1943, he helped Henry Murray, the director of Harvard University's psychological clinic, Walter Charles Langer, a psychoanalyst, and other experts create a report for the Office of Strategic Services, titled Analysis of the Personality of Adolph Hitler.

In 1944, Hanfstaengl was handed back to the British, who repatriated him to Germany at the end of World War II. William Shirer, a CBS journalist who resided in Nazi Germany until 1940 and was in frequent contact with Hanfstaengl, described him as an "eccentric, gangling man, whose sardonic wit somewhat compensated for his shallow mind."

Hanfstaengl wrote Unheard Witness (1957), which was later re-released as Hitler: The Missing Years, about his experiences. In 1974, Hanfstaengl attended his 65th Harvard reunion, where he regaled the Harvard University Band with stories about the authors of various Harvard fight songs.

== Personal life ==
On 11 February 1920, Hanfstaengl married Helene Elise Adelheid Niemeyer of Long Island. Their only son, Egon Ludwig, eventually enlisted in the U.S. Army Air Corps. A daughter, Hertha, died at the age of five.

== Death ==
Hanfstaengl died in Munich on 6 November 1975. In 2004, Peter Conradi authored a biography of Hanfstaengl, Hitler's Piano Player: The Rise and Fall of Ernst Hanfstaengl, Confidante of Hitler, Ally of FDR.

== In popular culture ==
Hanfstaengl was portrayed by Liev Schreiber in the 2003 Canadian television miniseries Hitler: The Rise of Evil. American actor Randy Quaid played him in the 1982 television film Inside the Third Reich. Ronald Pickup played him in the 1989 miniseries The Nightmare Years. In the 1964 novel, Herzog, written by Saul Bellow, a Putzi Hanfstaengl is mentioned as being Hitler's personal pianist. This fact was confirmed by Hanfstaengl himself, who said in 1969 that he was able to soothe Hitler to sleep with his piano playing.

In his story "The Sacred Grove", collected in While Rome Burns, Alexander Woollcott refers to an encounter with an uncooperative attendant in a New York picture store in 1916, whom he later identifies as Hanfstaengl.

In chapter 3 of “Munich Wolf” (2024) by Rory Clements, the fictional main character Detective Sebastian Wolff is introduced on page 20 to the non-fictional person of Ernst ‘Putzi’ Hanfstaengl.

== See also ==
- List of books by or about Adolf Hitler
- Hitler: The Rise of Evil

== Sources ==
- Toland, John (1976). Adolf Hitler. Garden City, New York: Doubleday & Company. p. 128. ISBN 9780385037242.
- Shirer, William Lawrence (1960), The Rise and Fall of the Third Reich: A History of Nazi Germany, New York City: Simon & Schuster, ASIN B0766DKDLR, LCCN 60006729, OCLC 1286630, OL 5794925M, Wikidata Q138029595
