= Pähl =

- Municipality
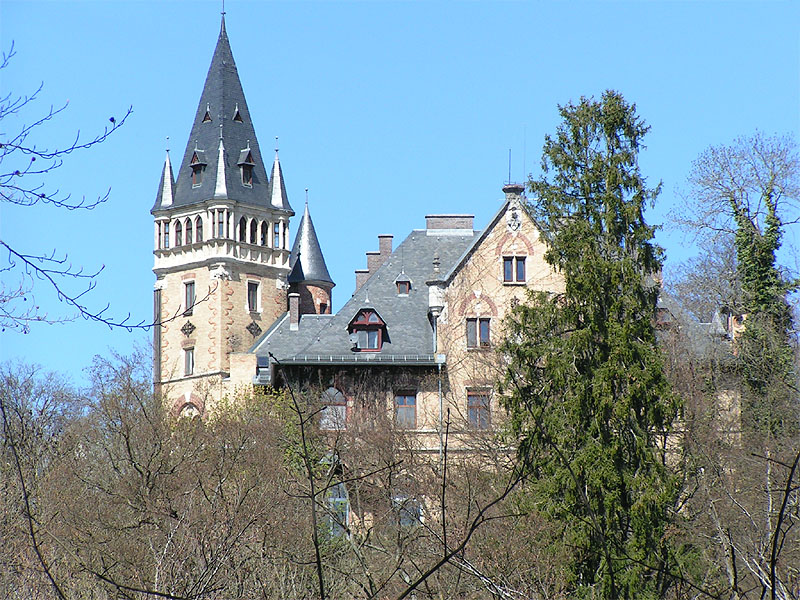
- Pähl Castle

- Coat of arms

- Location of Pähl within Weilheim-Schongau district
- Interactive map of Pähl
- Location within Germany Location within Bavaria
- Coordinates: 47°54′N 11°11′E
- Country: Germany
- State: Bavaria
- Admin. region: Upper Bavaria
- District: Weilheim-Schongau

Government
  - Mayor (2023–29): Simon Sörgel

Area
  - Total: 32.22 km^{2} (12.44 sq mi)
- Elevation: 591–760 m (1,939–2,493 ft)

Population (2025-12-31)
  - Total: 2,531
  - Density: 78.55/km^{2} (203.5/sq mi)
- Time zone: UTC+01:00 (CET)
  - Summer (DST): UTC+02:00 (CEST)
- Postal codes: 82396
- Dialling codes: 08808
- Vehicle registration: WM
- Website: www.gemeinde-paehl.de

Pähl (German pronunciation: [pɛːl]) is a municipality in the Weilheim-Schongau district, in Bavaria, Germany. It is on the lake of Ammersee to the southwest of Munich.

== Famous people ==
- Thomas Müller, footballer for Vancouver Whitecaps FC and Germany, grew up in the area.
- Franz-Ludwig Schenk Graf von Stauffenberg, lawyer, birthplace of his wife in this area.
- Duchess Sophie Charlotte in Bavaria met Edgar Hanfstaengl there.
