= Egon Hanfstaengl =

German-American art publisher (1921–2007)

- Egon Hanfstaengel in an interview with zeitzeugen-portal
- Born: Egon Sedgwick Hanfstaengl; February 3, 1921; New York City, New York, U.S.
- Died: March 21, 2007 (aged 86); United States
- Known for: Being the godchild of Adolf Hitler
- Spouse: Marjorie Hanfstaengl (died on June 28, 1991)

Egon Ludwig Sedgwick Hanfstaengl ([ɛɡɔn hanf.ˈʃtɛŋl] February 3, 1921 – March 21, 2007) was a German-American art publisher who was also Adolf Hitler's godson and the son of Ernst Hanfstaengl.

== Life ==
Egon Hanfstaengl was born on February 3, 1921, in New York City as the son of Ernst Hanfstaengl and Helene Hanfstaengl, née Niemeyer. Hitler became his godfather. He had a sister, Hertha, who died at the age of 5. He received his school education in England and Germany, where he also joined the Hitler Youth.

An American citizen by birth, he returned to the United States for his university education. As the son of a prominent former top official of the NSDAP, about whom the American press reported regularly, Hanfstaengl also came into the focus of the reporting. The New York Times announced the admission of the 18-year-old to Harvard University. The newspaper also reported that he volunteered for the United States Army Air Corps in early 1941. The news about Hanfstaengl's entry into the US Army also received attention from Minister of Propaganda Joseph Goebbels; he made a corresponding entry in his diary.

Journalist John Franklin Carter, who, as a consultant to US President Franklin Roosevelt, had psychological assessments prepared of some Nazi leaders, also asked Hanfstaengl's father and his son. When Hanfstaengl started working on a book about the Hitler Youth, Roosevelt, who knew his father, Ernst Hanfstaengl, from studying in Harvard, spontaneously dictated several paragraphs for a foreword, according to Carter's report. According to American records, Hanfstaengl offered Roosevelt to travel to Hitler in the Berghof near Berchtesgaden, in 1943 to attack him, but the White House ignored this suggestion.

After World War II, Hanfstaengl was a lecturer in European and American history at Brooklyn College in New York. He was the managing director of the art and publishing house Franz Hanfstaengl in Munich, from 1958 until its dissolution in 1980. As the godchild of Adolf Hitler, he appeared in several documentaries about Hitler.

He died on March 21, 2007, at the age of 86.

His son Eynon, an actor, committed suicide at the age of 37 years. He had other children, briefly mentioned in Conradi's biography.

== Literature ==
- Ulrich Chaussy: Zweimal Amerika und zurück nach Bayern: das bewegte Leben des Egon Hanfstaengl. Bayerischer Rundfunk, 2000.
