= Erna Hanfstaengl =

Sister to Ernst Hanfstaengl and acquaintances of Adolf Hitler

Erna Hanfstaengl ([ˈɛʁna hanfˈʃtɛŋl̩]; October 31, 1885 – May 6, 1981), was the elder sister of Ernst ("Putzi") Hanfstaengl and was an acquaintance of Adolf Hitler. (Note: See Erna as a girl: a portrait of Erna as a young girl, painted by Franz von Defregger and dated 1890. Hitler was born in 1889 so apparently Erna was about four years older than Hitler and about two years older than her brother Ernst (known as "Putzi"), who was born in 1887).) She also befriended Unity Mitford, who lived with Erna for a period. (Note: In the spring of 1939, Unity (always short of money) moved in with Erna. At Erna's request, Unity asked Hitler (during lunch) if he would meet with Erna, whose objective was to reconcile Putzi (who had fled Germany in fear of his life) with Hitler. Hitler agreed and met with Erna in private, later taking tea with both Unity and Erna.) (Note: After a complicated episode in which Erna later sought to use Unity as an intermediary to collect Putzi's back pay after he fled Germany in fear of his life, Hitler became furious at the "money-grubbing Hanfstaengls" and ordered Unity to move out of Erna's house immediately; Unity was reportedly terrified by this command (and by Hitler's attendant fury) and did so promptly. She was reluctant even to contact Erna after her conversation with Hitler, and did so at first through an intermediary. She later that day had her things retrieved from Erna's house by a friend and spent the night in a hotel. Erna at one time warned Unity to be more discreet in repeating and spreading idle Nazi party gossip that she heard, accusing Unity of acting as if the party were an operetta.)

== Romantic involvement with Hitler ==
Hitler may have been romantically involved with Erna, who was reported to have been beautiful, charming, cultured and intelligent. In the days following the failed Beer Hall Putsch, it was rumored that Hitler and Erna had sex while the former was hiding at a country house in Uffing. (Note: Konrad Heiden, an early Hitler biographer, even repeats these rumors as factual in his historical work. These fantastic stories are clearly false, as Hitler was seriously injured in the putsch and was in no shape for such activities.) (Note: Ernst Hanfstaengl also refutes these rumors in his memoirs.)

Rumors circulated in Munich in 1923 that Hitler and Erna were to be engaged; in the spring of 1923, the most widely read newspaper in Munich, the Münchner Neueste Nachrichten, published a story to this effect. (Note: The story was false, but Hitler found it rather flattering and seemed pleased with the rumor. Hitler's response to the press inquiries was that his only true bride was, and would always be, the German people — a rather clear allusion to Jesus Christ.)

It appears that the "tall and stately" Erna had simply been polite to Hitler and had shown courtesy to her brother's friend at their initial meeting in the early 1920s, and Hitler misinterpreted this as romantic affection. Gross claims that Hitler was in love with Erna, but that she considered the whole business to be a joke, and that she was amused at his attempts to court her. According to Gross, she was teased by her society friends about the unwanted affections shown by her "suitor" and made sure that she was never alone with him.

In any event it appears that during the period 1922–23, Erna assisted her brother in his aspirations to become one of Hitler's inner circle, by furthering Hitler's introduction to people of wealth and social standing in Munich. (Note: She held coffee parties for Hitler in her home.)

Several writers claim that, years later, Geli Raubal, Hitler's niece (and possibly his lover for a period, although many authorities (Note: There is a vast amount of speculation on the Hitler-Geli relationship. Christa Schroeder, one of Hitler's personal secretaries, was convinced that Geli and Hitler did not have sexual relations, Ibid; one of Geli's friends and daughter of Hitler's photographer Heinrich Hoffmann, Henrietta von Schirach, was also confident that the two did not have sexual relations, But see the conclusions by psychoanalyst Walter C. Langer in The Mind of Adolf Hitler, which are largely followed by Hitler historians Waite and Victor (Hitler's sexual relationship with Geli was coprophagic or coprophiliac, ultimately based on his masochism). Toland states, rather paradoxically, that the "discreet love affair" between Hitler and Geli was "most likely never consummated", Other historians, like Kershaw, simply decline to take a position on the ground that the matter is simply too speculative. (identifying three versions of the Hitler-Geli sexual relationship issue, i.e. (a) they were sexually intimate, (b) they were not sexually intimate and (c) Hitler enticed Geli to engage in sexual perversions that contributed to her suicide)) doubt their relationship was consummated) was jealous of Hitler's association with Erna.

The anti-Nazi German writer Friedrich Reck-Malleczewen recorded a conversation he had with Erna on this matter in his work Diary of a Man in Despair: Reck wrote that Erna had confided in him that her home had been broken into when she was away, and that she complained to her powerful friends about it. According to Reck, Erna told him that the break-in had been arranged by Heinrich Himmler, who was looking for compromising letters Hitler had written to her, letters which Himmler could use as blackmail "against his Lord and master, Hitler... in case of emergency" – that is, if Himmler feared he might be about to lose his position and influence within the Reich.

== Plot against Hitler ==
According to Heinrich Himmler's personal aide and special-plenipotentiary Walter Schellenberg, Erna was also involved in a plot to overthrow Hitler and to sue for peace with the Allies.

Erna owned a shop in Munich in 1943, and Schellenberg made her acquaintance in March 1943 at Himmler's suggestion. Himmler's wife and Erna were acquainted, and Frau Himmler had suggested to her husband that Erna would be a suitable person to conduct peace negotiations with the English, perhaps because she knew "people of influence" such as Randolph Churchill. (Note: Unity Mitford had introduced Erna to Randolph, who reportedly commented that she must visit his father while she was in London. There is no evidence, however, that Erna ever actually met Winston Churchill.)

Her peace plan consisted of having Himmler (with the aid of the Waffen SS) abduct Hitler to the Obersalzberg, where he would be held in SS detention. This would allow for the use of the cover story that Hitler was still in control of the government, since he spent much time at Obersalzberg anyway. A "Council of Twelve" would then constitute the de facto government, with Himmler at the head. Erna would then open an art shop in Paris and proceed to open secret negotiations with persons of influence in England, such as Randolph Churchill, whom she claimed to know.

Erna travelled to Paris twice in support of this plan and made contacts, including a former commandant of the French police. Schellenberg and Erna met several times during 1943. He advanced her 500,000 French francs, equivalent to €127,400 in 2022, to establish her art-shop cover in Paris, which she did. Nothing, however, came of the plot, and Schellenberg claimed that he himself would not have engaged an agent such as Erna Hanfstaengl, save for the insistence of Himmler. (Note: Frau Himmler apparently was insistent; Schellenberg reported that he considered Erna to be too volatile and emotional for cloak-and-dagger work.)

In May 1944, at Himmler's direction, Schellenberg ceased any further usage of Erna Hanfstaengl as a possible agent for peace negotiations. Schellenberg reportedly objected to her termination as an agent and argued with Himmler for a half-hour over the decision, but to no avail. (Note: Himmler told Schellenberg that Erna had been under Gestapo observation and investigation and was now deemed "unreliable" because of the undesirable social circles with which she was associated.)

== Sources ==
- Conradi, Peter (2006). Hitler's Piano Player: The Rise and Fall of Ernst Hanfstaengl. Carroll & Graf Publishers. ISBN 0-7867-1691-6.
- Doerries, Reinhard R. (2003). Hitler's Last Chief of Foreign Intelligence: Allied Interrogations of Walter Schellenberg. Routledge. ISBN 0-7146-5400-0.
- Fest, Joachim C. (2002). Hitler. Houghton Mifflin Harcourt. ISBN 0-15-602754-2.
- Gross, Fritz (1941). Hitler's Girls, Guns and Gangsters. London: Hurst.
- Hanfstaengl, Ernst ("Putzi") (1994). Hitler: The Missing Years. Arcade Publishing. ISBN 1-55970-278-8.
- Knopp, Guido (2003). Hitler's Women. Routledge. ISBN 0-415-94730-8.
- Large, David Clay (1997). Where Ghosts Walked: Munich's Road to the Third Reich. W. W. Norton & Company. ISBN 039303836X.
- Lovell, Mary S. (2003). The Sisters: The Saga of the Mitford Family. W. W. Norton & Company. ISBN 0-393-32414-1.
- Machtan, Lothar (2002). The Hidden Hitler. Basic Books. ISBN 0-465-04309-7. "One can only speculate ... but it is unlikely that he became intimate with her."
- Nicholls, David (2000). Adolf Hitler: A Biographical Companion. ABC-CLIO. ISBN 0874369657. "whether their relationship was explicitly sexual is one of several mysteries surrounding it."
- Reck-Malleczewen, Friedrich Percyval (2000). Diary of A Man In Despair. Translated by Rubens, Paul. London, UK: Duckworth Literary Entertainments.
- Sage, Steven F. (2006). Ibsen and Hitler: The Playwright, the Plagiarist, and the Plot for the Third Reich. Carroll & Graf Publishers. ISBN 0-7867-1713-0.
- Shirer, William Lawrence (1960). The Rise and Fall of the Third Reich: A History of Nazi Germany. New York City: Simon & Schuster. ASIN B0766DKDLR. LCCN 60006729. OCLC 1286630. OL 5794925M. Wikidata Q138029595.
- "Germany: Let's Be Friends!". Time. 9 March 1936.
- Toland, John (1976). Adolf Hitler. Garden City, New York: Doubleday & Company. ISBN 0-385-037244.
