= Robert J. Young =

Canadian historian (born 1942)

Robert J. Young (born 1942) is a Canadian historian and former professor of history at the University of Winnipeg (1968–2008). He specializes in 20th century European international politics. A graduate of the University of Saskatchewan and the London School of Economics, Young's doctoral dissertation was written under the supervision of Donald Cameron Watt. It was published by Harvard University Press as In Command of France: French Foreign Policy and Military Planning, 1933-1940. Over the last forty years, Professor Young, a Canadian, has written numerous academic books and articles including France and the Origins of the Second World War and Louis Barthou: Power and Pleasure. Throughout, he has consistently rejected the la décadence thesis that the alleged decadence of France in the 1930s made the Fall of France inevitable.

== Work ==
- "Preparations for Defeat: French War Doctrine in the Inter-War Period" pages 155-172 from Journal of European Studies, Issue #2, June 1972.
- "The Aftermath of Munich: The Course of French Diplomacy, October 1938 to March 1939" pages 305-322 from French Historical Studies, Fall 1973.
- "The Strategic Dream: French Air Doctrine in the Inter-War Period, 1919-1939" pages 31–42 from Journal of Contemporary History, October 1974.
- In Command of France: French Foreign Policy and Military planning, 1933-1940, Cambridge : Harvard University Press, 1978, ISBN 0-674-44536-8.
- "La Guerre de Longue Durée: Some Reflections on French Strategy and Diplomacy in the 1930s" pages 41–64 from General Staffs and Diplomacy Before the Second World War edited by Adrian Preston, London: Colm Helm, 1978.
- French Foreign Policy, 1918-1945: A Guide to Research and Research Materials, Wilmington, Del.: Scholarly Resources, 1981, ISBN 0-8420-2178-7.
- "French Military Intelligence and Nazi Germany" pages 271-309 from Knowing One's Enemies: Intelligence Assessment Before the Second World War edited by Ernest May, Princeton: Princeton University Press, 1984.
- "The Use and Abuse of Fear: France and the Air Menace in the 1930s" pages 88–109 from Intelligence and National Security, Issue #4, 1987.
- Power and Pleasure : Louis Barthou and the Third French Republic, Montreal : McGill-Queen’s University Press, 1991, ISBN 0-7735-0863-5.
- France and the Origins of the Second World War, St. Martin's Press: New York, 1996, ISBN 978-0-312-16186-6
- “In the Eye of the Beholder: The Cultural Representation of France and Germany by the New York Times 1939-1940” pages 245-268 from The French Defeat of 1940 Reassessments edited by Joel Blatt, Berghahn Books, Providence, Rhode Island, United States of America, 1998, ISBN 1-57181-109-5.
- “A Douce and Dextrous Persuasion: French Propaganda and Franco-American Relations in the 1930s” pages 195-214 from French Foreign and Defence Policy, 1918-1940 The Decline and Fall of A Great Power edited by Robert Boyce, London, United Kingdom: Routledge, 1998, ISBN 0-415-15039-6.
- Marketing Marianne : French Propaganda in America, 1900-1940, New Brunswick, N.J. : Rutgers University Press, 2004, ISBN 0-8135-3377-5.
- An Uncertain Idea of France : Essays and Reminiscence on the Third Republic, New York : P. Lang, 2005, ISBN 0-8204-7481-9.
