= Steven Sage =

American scholar and former diplomat

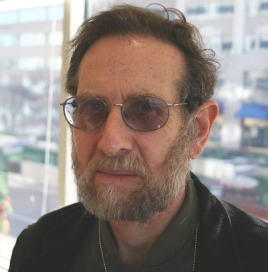
Steven F. Sage

Steven F. Sage (born 1947, New York City) is an American scholar and former diplomat who has written on ancient China and on 20th-century Europe. He is an author of two books Ancient Sichuan and the Unification of China (1992) and Ibsen and Hitler (2006). He is currently working on books on the Holocaust in Bulgaria and on the building of the Reichsautobahn.

== Education and career ==
As an undergraduate at the University of Pennsylvania, Sage studied Sinology under Professor Derk Bodde, then proceeded to a doctoral grant from the East–West Center at the University of Hawaii.

In 1981 he entered the United States Foreign Service via the examination system and served two years as vice consul at the U.S. Embassy in Beijing. Then came language training in Bulgarian and two years at the embassy in Sofia. Sage's colleagues during 1984-1986 included John Beyerle, later the American ambassador to Moscow, and the military attaché Lt. Col. Michael V. Hayden, who went on to direct the National Security Agency and then the Central Intelligence Agency. Their duty in Bulgaria coincided with stepped-up repression by the regime of the country's Turkish minority. Sage obtained initial details from a consular contact, whereupon the embassy investigated and lodged a formal protest with the Bulgarian government. Publicity included Sage's essays in the State Department's annual country-by-country human rights reports to the U.S. Senate, for 1984 and 1985.

In the 1990s, Sage taught history at Middle Tennessee State University in Murfreesboro, Tennessee, but left without seeking tenure.

== Sinology ==
Sage's book Ancient Sichuan and the Unification of China presented a seemingly paradoxical thesis: the central, i.e. decisive importance for Chinese antiquity of a peripheral region. Sage evaluated Bronze Age excavations at Sanxingdui (late 2nd millennium BCE) as well as the archaeology of the Shu and Ba states (1st millennium BCE). He moreover translated Qin documents unearthed in Sichuan, revealing the processes of colonization and Sinification in the 4th century BCE. The Sichuanese archaeologist Tong Enzheng approved the draft manuscript of Ancient Sichuan. Victor Mair stated, "Sage rightly focuses on Qin as the agent of incorporation in bringing Sichuan securely within the orbit of China writ large. Had there been no Qin, there would be no China as it has been known for the last two millennia and more. Certainly Sage proves this for Sichuan beyond any reasonable doubt ... When a radical rewriting of Chinese history is carried out during the next century, Sage's contribution will have to be recognized."

Recognition came in the form of an honorific title as Senior Research Fellow of the University of Massachusetts Amherst' Warring States Project, and also with the (unauthorized, abridged) translation into Chinese of Ancient Sichuan and its serialized publication in the Chengdu archaeological journal Si chuan wen wu (四川文物).

== Studies on World War II and the Holocaust ==
While reading about the Nazi engineer Fritz Todt, Sage became intrigued by parallels between the Nazi regime and Ibsen's plays. He found that the construction agency "Organisation Todt" was a huge conglomerate and a major exploiter of slave labor, yet it had been omitted from most historiography. The only published biography of Todt, in German, was subtitled Baumeister des Dritten Reiches, i.e., "Master Builder of the Third Reich". Sage noticed that certain elements in Todt's career matched episodes in Ibsen's Master Builder. Turning to Hitler's Tischgespräche ("Table Talk"), Sage found lines evidently derived from the Ibsen play. Research on Hitler revealed that the dictator had indeed read Ibsen, in German translation.

Sage also studied Ibsen's two-part epic, Emperor and Galilean, about the Roman Emperor Julian the Apostate, who tried to establish what Ibsen called "the third Reich". Julian dies onstage but the play ends with a declaration that he will return, reincarnated, to found the prophesied Third Reich. Paraphrases in Hitler's recorded conversation indicated knowledge of that drama. The play had been venerated by a German literary cult in the early 20th century.

Furthermore, Sage found that, in several instances, Ibsen's plays had influenced not only Hitler's conversations, but also his policies. Ibsen and Hitler was published on the centenary of Ibsen's death in May 2006. The University of Oslo history professor Hans Fredrik Dahl wrote in Dagbladet: "More thorough than anyone before him, Steven Sage has gone through the material around the young Hitler and his literary sources. His work encompasses much new research and draws conclusions in many different directions. That there was an actual line of influence between Ibsen and the young Hitler is to me beyond doubt."

However, experts in the fields of Nazism and the Holocaust have either ignored or decidedly rejected Sage's claims. The book received only one review in a reputable online review journal, which called it methodologically flawed, "highly speculative", and states that Ibsen and Hitler adds virtually nothing to our understanding of Hitler, Nazi antisemitism, the Third Reich, and the Holocaust.

Having entered Holocaust-related research, Sage went on to explore the question of Bulgaria's repression of its Jewish minority during World War II. In a forthcoming book, Sage explains how 80 percent of the country’s Jews survived, though they endured forced labor, loss of civil rights, expropriation of all assets, eviction, and ghettoization. Sage is also working on a book about the Reichsautobahn and Organisation Todt.

His Chinese name is 史蒂文 (Shi Diwen).

== Publications ==
- Ancient Sichuan and the Unification of China. SUNY series in Chinese local studies. Albany: State University of New York Press, 1992. ISBN 9780585065144
- Ibsen and Hitler: The Playwright, the Plagiarist, and the Plot for the Third Reich. New York: Carroll & Graf, 2006. ISBN 9780786717132
