= Truman Smith (officer) =

US army officer

- Born: August 25, 1893; West Point, New York, U.S.
- Died: October 3, 1970 (aged 77); Fairfield, Connecticut, U.S.
- Resting place: Arlington National Cemetery, Sec: 46, Site: 759-17
- Education: B.A., 1915, Yale College; 1915-1916 graduate student, Columbia University
- Political party: Republican
- Spouse: Katherine Alling Hollister (1917-1970, his death)
- Parent(s): Capt. Edmund Dickinson Smith (U.S. Inf.) and Mary (Dewing) Smith
- Relatives: Truman Smith, paternal grandfather
- Military career
- Allegiance: United States
- Branch: United States Army
- Service years: 1916–1946
- Rank: Colonel
- Conflicts: Border War (1910–1919); World War I (Marne, Meuse-Argonne Campaign, Bois de Foret); World War II (Washington, D.C.)
- Awards: Silver Star

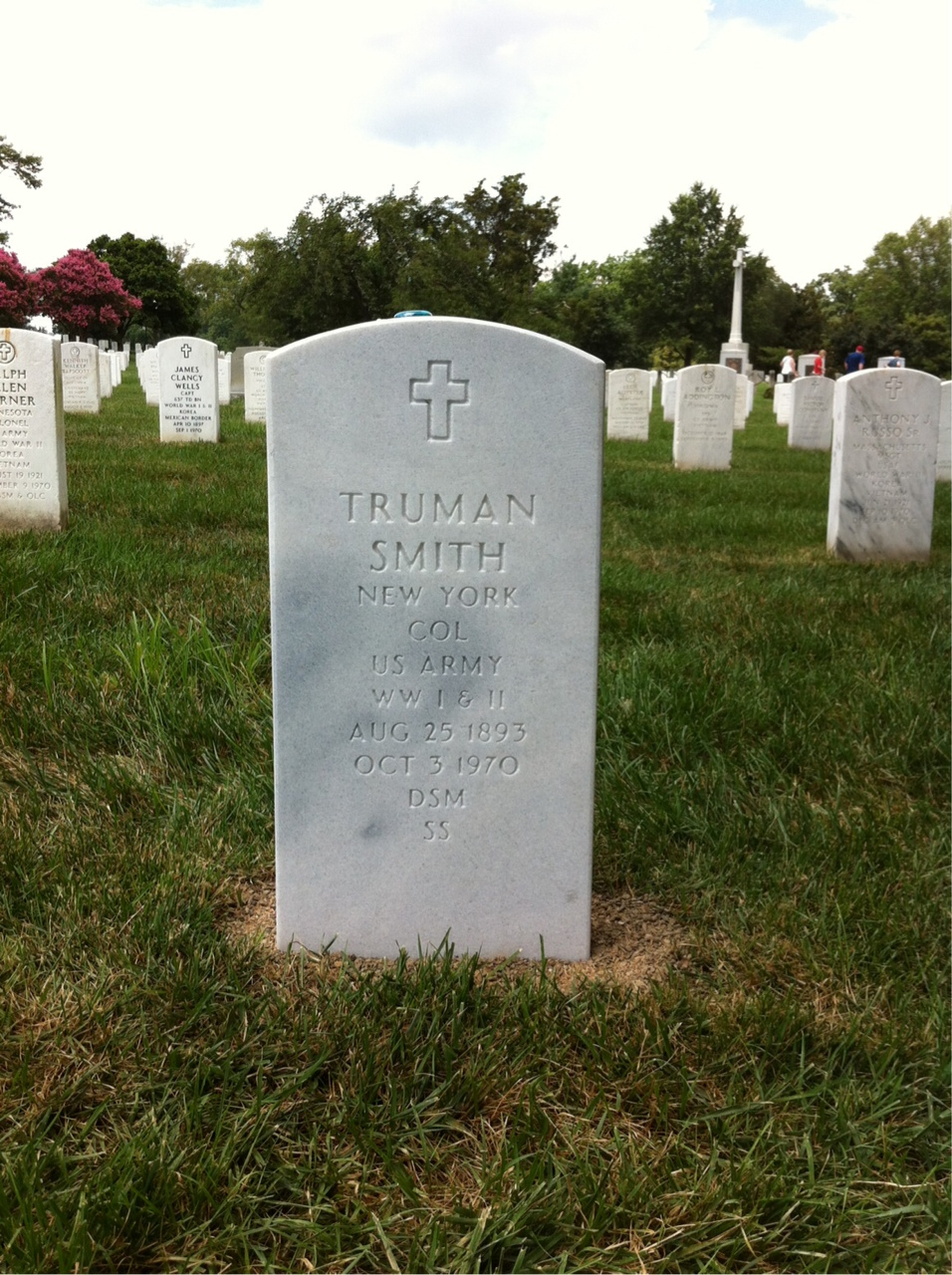
Grave of Truman Smith at Arlington National Cemetery

Truman Smith (August 25, 1893 – October 3, 1970) was a U.S. Army infantry officer, military attache, and intelligence officer. He collected valuable intelligence on German military capabilities while serving in Berlin before World War II. During the war, he was a personal advisor to General George C. Marshall. He influenced the establishment of the new Bundeswehr to play a role in the Cold War.

== Early life and career ==
He was brought up and attended schools in Stamford, Connecticut. His father was killed in action at Cebu, Philippine Islands (February 1900). He attended Yale (1912–15) and earned a B.A., 100 years after his namesake grandfather. He was a graduate student at Columbia (1915–1916).

He married Katherine Alling Hollister in 1917.

== U.S. Army ==
He served on the Mexican border as a lieutenant in the New York National Guard (1916), and was commissioned second lieutenant in the Regular Army November 30, 1916.

In World War I he was a company commander and battalion commander in the U.S. 4th Infantry Regiment in France during the Marne and Meuse-Argonne Campaigns. He received the Silver Star (recommended for Distinguished Service Cross) and promotion to major for leading his battalion in capture of the Bois de Foret.

He was in Coblenz during the occupation of Germany as political advisor to the officer in charge of civil affairs (January 1919 – June 1920), followed by nearly four years as assistant military attaché in Berlin (June 1920 – April 1924). In November 1922, Smith was sent to Munich to research a local political organizer, Adolf Hitler. In his report filed to Washington, he prophetically identified the young Hitler as a "marvelous demagogue," who was the dominating force in his Bavarian fascist movement and that his forceful, logical, and fanatical speaking could sway a neutral listener.

Smith returned to Berlin as military attaché from 1935 to 1939.

During the eleven years between postings in Berlin, he completed the U.S. Infantry School, Ft. Benning, Georgia (1927), attended the Command and General Staff School, Ft. Leavenworth (1928), returned to the Infantry School as an instructor (1928–32), attended the Army War College (1933), and served with the 27th infantry regiment, Schofield Barracks, Hawaii (June 1933 – April 1935).

He returned to Washington, D.C., as a specialist on Germany in the U.S. Army military intelligence division, and as a personal adviser to General George C. Marshall (1939–1945).

From Berlin in the late 1930s, he reported on German rearmament, Luftwaffe capabilities, and the increasing extent of the Germans' organization for war. He was friendly with important officers such as Werner von Blomberg (Minister of War).

He arranged (May 1936) the first of Colonel Charles Lindbergh's five inspection trips to the German aircraft industry and the Luftwaffe. Senior Luftwaffe officers discussed air tactics and operations with Lindbergh; he flew a Messerschmitt Bf 109. The trips produced valuable intelligence. Lindbergh's public opposition to Roosevelt's war policies, among other things, made him unpopular. Accepting a medal from Hermann Göring fueled suspicion that he was a Nazi sympathizer and disloyal to his country.

Smith represented that Lindbergh's visits in fact provided valuable intelligence. Smith was himself vulnerable to vilification as a defeatist or a German sympathizer, but Marshall, who had commanded him at Fort Benning, protected him.

Smith, by all accounts, served the army well during World War II, but he and his wife remained staunchly anti-Roosevelt in their outlook. Upon hearing of Roosevelt's death in April 1945, Smith and his wife burst into roars of laughter and embraced each other and a friend.

== Retirement ==
He sought the Republican nomination for Connecticut's 4th congressional district in 1946, but lost to Hon. John Davis Lodge in 1946. He advised the Eberstadt (Armed Forces) Committee, part of the first Hoover Commission on Organization of the Executive Branch (1945–1946, or 1948). He was military aide to the governor of Connecticut. He translated, edited, and wrote the preface for Invasion, 1944: Rommel and the Normandy Campaign, by Lieutenant General Hans Speidel, Rommel's chief of staff.

Smith associated with the National Economic Council, a far-right antisemitic group that opposed the civil rights movement and linked it to communism.

In 1958, General Albert Wedemeyer published an autobiographic book about World War II. In this book, he praised Smith for his achievements during his time in Berlin and the quality of the reports he delivered, i.e. about the German re-armament. Wedemeyer pointed out that Smith (and Charles Lindbergh) earned gratefulness of the United States but were criticized by a clique of politicians that wanted to ignore the war preparations of the Nazi regime.

== Awards ==
- Distinguished Service Medal
- Silver Star
- World War I Victory Medal
- American Defense Service Medal
- American Campaign Medal
- World War II Victory Medal
- Army of Occupation Medal with "Germany" clasp

=== Distinguished Service Medal citation ===
The President of the United States of America, authorized by Act of Congress July 9, 1918, takes pleasure in presenting the Army Distinguished Service Medal to Colonel (General Staff Corps) Truman Smith (ASN: 0-4619), United States Army, for exceptionally meritorious and distinguished services to the Government of the United States, in a duty of great responsibility, during the period from August 1935 to March 1938, and from 23 February 1942 through 19 January 1945.

General Orders: War Department, General Orders No. 8 (February 7, 1945)

Action Date: August 1935 – March 1938 & February 23, 1942 – January 19, 1945

=== Silver Star citation ===
By direction of the President, under the provisions of the act of Congress approved July 9, 1918 (Bul. No. 43, W.D., 1918), Captain (Infantry) Truman Smith, United States Army, is cited by the Commanding General, American Expeditionary Forces, for gallantry in action and a silver star may be placed upon the ribbon of the Victory Medals awarded him. Captain Smith distinguished himself by gallantry in action while serving with the 4th Infantry Regiment, 3d Division, American Expeditionary Forces, in action in the Bois de Foret, France, 22 October 1918, and by his brilliant leadership of his battalion.

General Orders: GHQ, American Expeditionary Forces, Citation Orders No. 4 (June 3, 1919)

Action Date: October 22, 1918

== Dates of rank ==
- 2nd lieutenant, NYNG – 28 March 1916
- 1st lieutenant, NYNG – 11 November 1916
- 1st lieutenant, Regular Army – 6 December 1916
- Captain – 14 July 1917
- Major – 7 April 1919
- Reverted to rank of captain – 16 March 1920
- Major – 16 March 1928
- Lieutenant colonel – 1 July 1938
- Retired and called to active duty temporary rank of colonel – 1 February 1942
- Released from active duty – 13 June 1946

== Publications ==
- Smith, Truman (January 1946). "German General Staff Abdicates". Infantry Journal. 58: 22–7.
- Smith, Truman (August 1946). "Stalingrad or Bust". Infantry Journal. 59: 14–19.
- Smith, Truman (April 1956). "Lindbergh and the Luftwaffe". American Mercury. 82: 93.
- Smith, Truman (August 1960). "Infamous- Record of Soviet Espionage". Reader's Digest. 77: 36–42.
- Speidel, Hans (1950) [1971]. Invasion 1944; ein Beitrag zu Rommels und des Reiches Schicksal [Invasion 1944; Rommel and the Normandy campaign]. Introduction by Truman Smith. Westport, Connecticut: Greenwood Press. ISBN 0837159881. LCCN 79147223.
- Smith, Truman (1984). Robert Hessen (ed.). Berlin alert: the memoirs and reports of Truman Smith. Stanford, Calif.: Hoover Institution Press, Stanford University. ISBN 0817978917. LCCN 83022621.
- Smith, Truman. Facts of Life. (unpublished)
