= Amers =

Collection of poetry by Saint-John Perse

- First edition cover
- Translator: Wallace Fowlie
- Language: French
- Genre: Poetry
- Publisher: Nouvelle Revue Française
- Publication date: 16 May 1957
- Publication place: France
- English publication date: 1961
- Pages: 187
- ISBN: 2070256758
- Dewey Decimal: 841.92
- LC Class: PQ2623 .E386
- Preceded by: Vents (1946)
- Followed by: Chronique (1960)

Amers ([a.mɛʁ]) is a collection of poetry by French writer Saint-John Perse, published in 1957. Perse won the Nobel Prize in Literature three years later.

The title means "sea marks" (points used to navigate at sea, both manmade and natural); it possibly puns on the French amer(s), "bitter", perhaps meaning "briny" here, and has echoes of mer, "sea".

Amers was ranked #97 in Le Monde's 100 Books of the Century.
