= Pertinax (disambiguation) =

Pertinax (126-193) was Emperor of Rome for three months in 193.

Pertinax may also refer to:

- Pertinax of Byzantium (died 187), Bishop of Byzantium from 169 to 187
- André Géraud or Pertinax (1882–1974), French journalist
- Pertinax (material), a trade name for FR-2, a composite material used in the manufacture of printed circuit boards
