= Jules Renard =

French author (1864–1910)

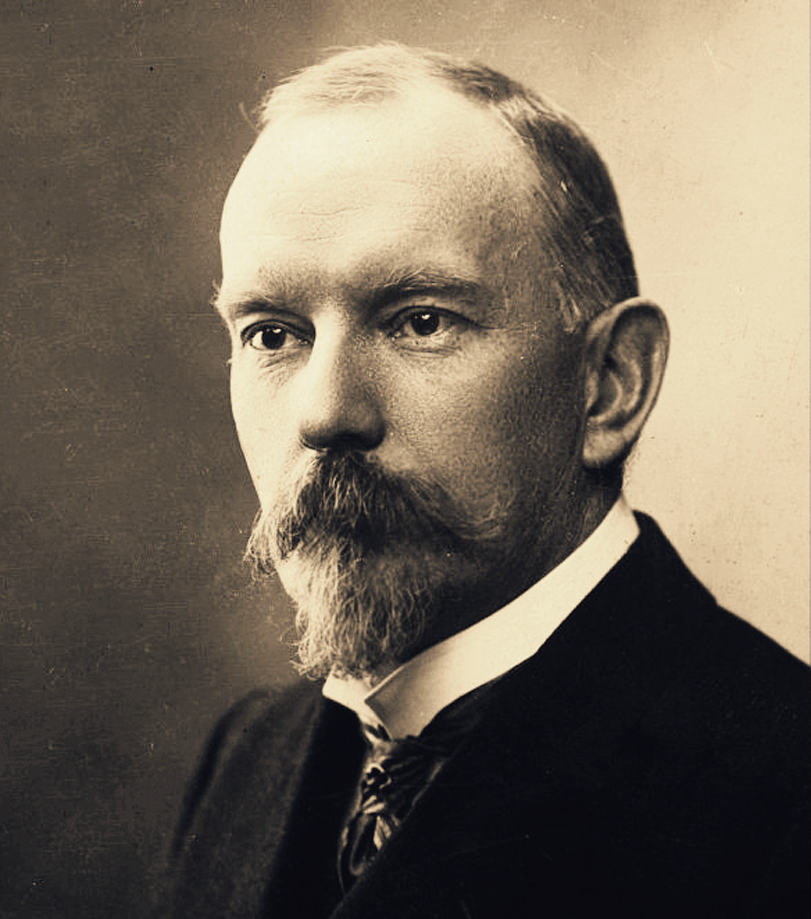
- Jules Renard, French author and playwright.
- Born: Pierre-Jules Renard; 22 February 1864; Châlons-du-Maine, Mayenne, France
- Died: 22 May 1910 (aged 46); Paris, France
- Occupation: Author
- Spouse: Marie Morneau (m. 1888)

Pierre-Jules Renard (pronounced [pjɛʁ ʒyl ʁənaʁ]; 22 February 1864 – 22 May 1910) was a French novelist, playwright, and diarist. He was a member of the Académie Goncourt and is acclaimed for Poil de carotte (Carrot Top, 1894), a bitterly ironical account of his own childhood. His other famous works include, Les Histoires Naturelles (Nature Stories, 1896), Le Plaisir de rompre (The Pleasure of Breaking, 1898), and the posthumously published Huit Jours à la campagne (Eight Days in the Country, 1912).

== Early life ==
The child of François Renard and Anna-Rose Colin, Renard was born in Châlons-du-Maine, Mayenne where his father was working on the construction of a railroad. Renard grew up in Chitry-les-Mines, (Nièvre). He had three older siblings, including Amélie (born 1858), who died at a young age. A second sister was also named Amélie (born 1859). A third child, Maurice, was born before Pierre-Jules in 1862. Renard's childhood was characterized as difficult and sad (un grand silence roux or “a great ruddy silence”). Although he decided not to attend the prestigious École normale supérieure, love of literature would eventually dominate his life. From 1885 to 86, he served in the military in Bourges.

== Life and career ==
On 28 April 1888, Renard married Marie Morneau. He and his wife lived at 43 rue du Rocher in the 8th Arrondissement of Paris. He began to frequent literary cafés and to contribute to Parisian newspapers. Among his steady friends were Alfred Capus and Lucien Guitry. Jules Renard wrote poems, short stories, short plays, novels and his famous Poil de carotte. He was elected mayor (maire) of Chitry les mines (58) on 15 May 1904 as the socialist candidate and became a member of the Académie Goncourt in 1907, thanks to Octave Mirbeau. He died of arteriosclerosis in Paris.

== Work ==
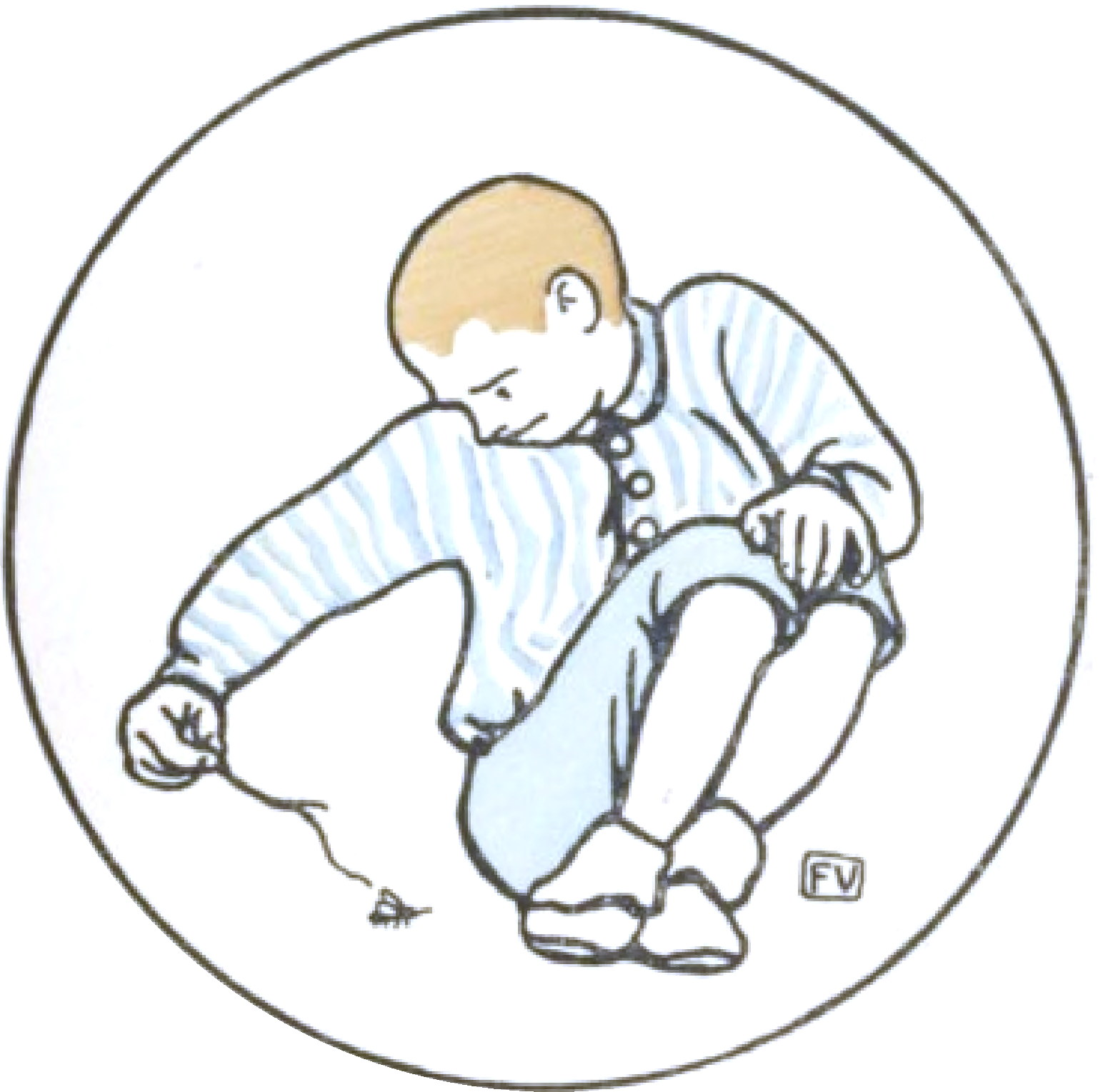
Illustration for Poil de carotte (1902).

Some of Jules Renard's works take their inspiration from the countryside he loved in the Nièvre region. His character portraits are sharp, ironic and sometimes cruel (in his Histoires naturelles he humanizes animals and animalizes men) and he was an active supporter of pacifism and anticlericalism (apparent in La Bigote).

His Journal, 1887–1910 (published in 1925) is a masterpiece of introspection, irony, humor and nostalgia, and provides an important glimpse into the literary life.

The English writer Somerset Maugham was influenced to publish his own well-known journals by the example of Renard. In the introduction to his own work A Writer's Notebook, Maugham wrote an apt summary of the virtues of Renard's journal: “The journal is wonderfully good reading. It is extremely amusing. It is witty and subtle and often wise… Jules Renard jotted down neat retorts and clever phrases, epigrams, things seen, the sayings of people and the look of them, descriptions of scenery, effects of sunshine and shadow, everything, in short, that could be of use to him when he sat down to write for publication.”

But Maugham also called the Journal "the only good novel Jules Renard wrote" and found his one-act plays "neither very good nor very bad".

The American novelist Gilbert Sorrentino based his 1994 work Red the Fiend on Renard's Poil de carotte. For a great part, the 2008 memoir Nothing to Be Frightened Of by the English novelist Julian Barnes is a homage to Jules Renard.

Renard is one of several popular philosophers whose quotations appear on the road signs of Project HIMANK in the Ladakh region of northern India. On one such sign in the Nubra Valley, he is quoted as saying, “Laziness is nothing more than the habit of resting before you get tired”.

== Works ==
=== Novels ===
- Crime de village (1888)
- Sourires pincés (1890)
- L'Écornifleur (Paul Ollendorff, 1892) (Note: Literally The Sniffer, it tells of Henri, a parasite, who makes himself indispensable to the Vernets, a credulous middle-class family, during their holiday on the English Channel coast. In 1955 Les Bibliophiles de France published a special edition with new engravings by Jacques Boullaire. It has been adapted as a television film in 1964 and 2010, directed by Edmond Tyborowski and Philippe Bérenger respectively.)
- La Lanterne sourde (Paul Ollendorff, 1893)
- Coquecigrues (Paul Ollendorff, 1893)
- Deux Fables sans morale (1893)
- Le Coureur de filles (1894)
- Histoires naturelles (1894)
- Poil de carotte (1894), text
- Le Vigneron dans sa vigne (1894)
- La Maîtresse (1896)
- Bucoliques (Paul Ollendorff, 1898)
- Les Philippe (1907) (Note: Special edition published in 1958 by Les Bibliophiles Franks with new lithographs by André Minaux.)
- Patrie (1907)
- Mots d'écrit (1908)
- Ragotte (1909)
- Nos Frères farouches (1909)
- Causeries (1910)
- L'Œil clair (1913)
- Les Cloportes (1919)

=== Plays ===
- La Demande (1895)
- Le Plaisir de rompre (1897)
- Le Pain de ménage (1898)
- Poil de carotte (1900)
- Monsieur Vernet (1903)
- La Bigote (1909)
- Huit Jours à la campagne (1912)

=== Non-fiction ===
- Journal, 1887–1910 (1925), text
- Writing lessons, published by Ringer (2008)

== Quotes ==
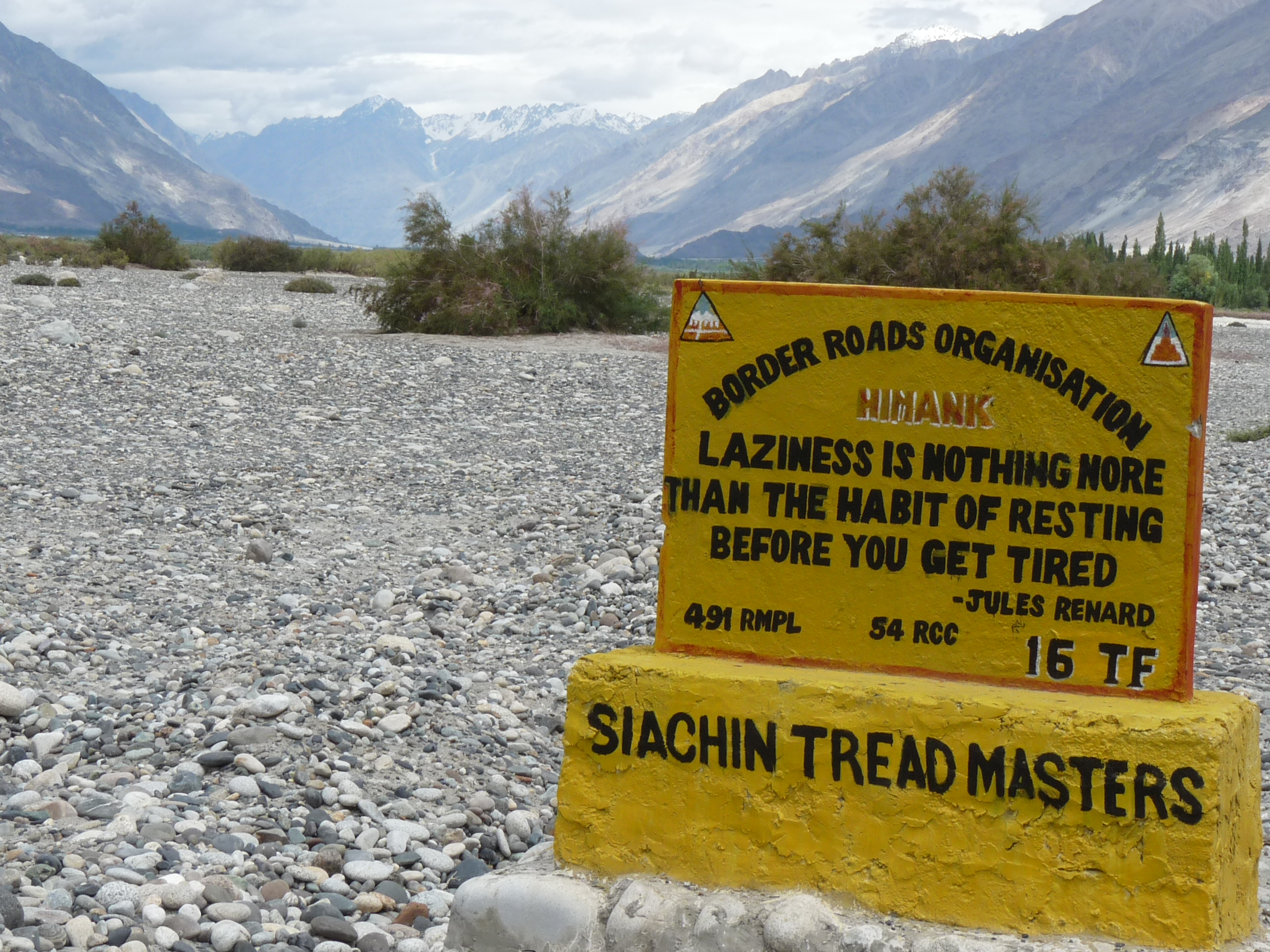
Project HIMANK

- It is not how old you are but how you are old.
- If you are afraid of being lonely, don't try to be right.
- Writing is an occupation in which you have to keep proving your talent to people who have none.
- Culture is what's left after you have forgotten everything.
- I don't know if God exists, but it would be better for His reputation if He didn't.
- Look for the ridiculous in everything, and you will find it.
- If money does not make you happy; give it back.
- Writing is the only way to talk without being interrupted.
- If one were to build the house of happiness, the largest space would be the waiting room.
- Dying serves no purpose so die now.
- The horse is the only animal into which one can bang nails.
- We don't understand life any better at forty than at twenty, but we know it and admit it.
- I find when I do not think of myself I do not think at all.
- Failure is not the only punishment for laziness; there is also the success of others.
- Laziness is nothing more than the habit of resting before you get tired.
- The only man who is really free is the one who can turn down an invitation to dinner without giving an excuse.
- Writing is the only profession where no one considers you ridiculous if you earn no money.
- As I grow to understand life less and less, I learn to love it more and more.
- I am never bored anywhere; being bored is an insult to oneself.
- If I were to begin life again, I should want it as it was. I would only open my eyes a little more.
- Love is like an hourglass, with the heart filling up as the brain empties.
- Not everybody can be an orphan.

== See also ==
- Le Monde's 100 Books of the Century, a list which includes the Journal
