= Paroles =

Poetry collection by Jacques Prévert

- First edition cover
- Author: Jacques Prévert
- Cover artist: Brassaï
- Language: French
- Genre: Poetry
- Publisher: Le Calligraphe
- Publication date: 1945
- Publication place: France
- Dewey Decimal: 841.914
- Followed by: Histoires

Paroles ([pa.ʁɔl]; "Words") is a collection of poems by Jacques Prévert, first published in 1946.

Lawrence Ferlinghetti's translation of 44 poems from this collection was published by Penguin Books in the 1960s, under the title Selections from Paroles. A sound recording of his reading the poems was made in the 1950s. It was ranked 16th in Le Monde's 100 Books of the Century.
