= Le Monde's 100 Books of the Century =

The 100 Books of the Century (French: Les cent livres du siècle) is a list of the hundred most memorable books of the 20th century, regardless of language, according to a poll performed during the spring of 1999 by the French retailer Fnac and the Paris newspaper Le Monde.

== Overview ==
Starting from a preliminary list of 200 titles created by bookshops and journalists, 17,000 French participants responded to the question "Which books have stuck in your mind?" (Quels livres sont restés dans votre mémoire?) As Le Monde journalist Josyane Savigneau aptly clarified in her article, the list is not meant to encompass the 100 most distinguished French literary works of the 20th century, but rather to reflect the emotional connections of the French populace.

The list includes both classic novels and genre fiction (Tolkien, Agatha Christie, A. C. Doyle), as well as poetry, drama and nonfiction literature (Freud's essays and the diary of Anne Frank). There are also comic books on the list, one volume from each of these five Francophone or Italian series: Asterix, Tintin, Blake and Mortimer, Gaston and Corto Maltese.

The large number of French novels on the list is due to the demographics of the surveyed group. Likewise, comparable lists by English-language entities—such as the two lists of Modern Library's 100 Best Novels published in 1998, one by the Board of the Modern Library and the other by readers who responded—disproportionately favor British and American authors. Only English-language works were eligible for the two Modern Library lists.

== List ==
No.	Title	Author	Year	Language
1	The Stranger; The Outsider	Albert Camus	1942	French
2	In Search of Lost Time; Remembrance of Things Past	Marcel Proust	1913–27	French
3	The Trial	Franz Kafka	1925	German
4	The Little Prince	Antoine de Saint-Exupéry	1943	French
5	Man's Fate	André Malraux	1933	French
6	Journey to the End of the Night	Louis-Ferdinand Céline	1932	French
7	The Grapes of Wrath	John Steinbeck	1939	English
8	For Whom the Bell Tolls	Ernest Hemingway	1940	English
9	Le Grand Meaulnes	Alain-Fournier	1913	French
10	Froth on the Daydream	Boris Vian	1947	French
11	The Second Sex	Simone de Beauvoir	1949	French
12	Waiting for Godot	Samuel Beckett	1952	French
13	Being and Nothingness	Jean-Paul Sartre	1943	French
14	The Name of the Rose	Umberto Eco	1980	Italian
15	The Gulag Archipelago	Aleksandr Solzhenitsyn	1973	Russian
16	Paroles	Jacques Prévert	1946	French
17	Alcools	Guillaume Apollinaire	1913	French
18	The Blue Lotus	Hergé	1936	French
19	The Diary of a Young Girl	Anne Frank	1947	Dutch
20	Tristes Tropiques	Claude Lévi-Strauss	1955	French
21	Brave New World	Aldous Huxley	1932	English
22	Nineteen Eighty-Four	George Orwell	1949	English
23	Asterix the Gaul	René Goscinny and Albert Uderzo	1959	French
24	The Bald Soprano	Eugène Ionesco	1952	French
25	Three Essays on the Theory of Sexuality	Sigmund Freud	1905	German
26	The Abyss; Zeno of Bruges	Marguerite Yourcenar	1968	French
27	Lolita	Vladimir Nabokov	1955	English
28	Ulysses	James Joyce	1922	English
29	The Tartar Steppe	Dino Buzzati	1940	Italian
30	The Counterfeiters	André Gide	1925	French
31	The Horseman on the Roof	Jean Giono	1951	French
32	Belle du Seigneur	Albert Cohen	1968	French
33	One Hundred Years of Solitude	Gabriel García Márquez	1967	Spanish
34	The Sound and the Fury	William Faulkner	1929	English
35	Thérèse Desqueyroux	François Mauriac	1927	French
36	Zazie in the Metro	Raymond Queneau	1959	French
37	Confusion of Feelings	Stefan Zweig	1927	German
38	Gone with the Wind	Margaret Mitchell	1936	English
39	Lady Chatterley's Lover	D. H. Lawrence	1928	English
40	The Magic Mountain	Thomas Mann	1924	German
41	Bonjour Tristesse	Françoise Sagan	1954	French
42	Le Silence de la mer	Vercors	1942	French
43	Life: A User's Manual	Georges Perec	1978	French
44	The Hound of the Baskervilles	Arthur Conan Doyle	1901–02	English
45	Under the Sun of Satan	Georges Bernanos	1926	French
46	The Great Gatsby	F. Scott Fitzgerald	1925	English
47	The Joke	Milan Kundera	1967	Czech
48	Contempt/A Ghost at Noon	Alberto Moravia	1954	Italian
49	The Murder of Roger Ackroyd	Agatha Christie	1926	English
50	Nadja	André Breton	1928	French
51	Aurélien	Louis Aragon	1944	French
52	The Satin Slipper	Paul Claudel	1929	French
53	Six Characters in Search of an Author	Luigi Pirandello	1921	Italian
54	The Resistible Rise of Arturo Ui	Bertolt Brecht	1941	German
55	Friday	Michel Tournier	1967	French
56	The War of the Worlds	H. G. Wells	1898 (Note: Included because it was not published in French until 1900.)	English
57	If This Is a Man; Se questo è un uomo, Survival in Auschwitz	Primo Levi	1947	Italian
58	The Lord of the Rings	J.R.R. Tolkien	1954–55	English
59	The Tendrils of the Vine	Colette	1908	French
60	Capital of Pain	Paul Éluard	1926	French
61	Martin Eden	Jack London	1909	English
62	The Ballad of the Salty Sea	Hugo Pratt	1967	Italian
63	Writing Degree Zero	Roland Barthes	1953	French
64	The Lost Honour of Katharina Blum	Heinrich Böll	1974	German
65	The Opposing Shore	Julien Gracq	1951	French
66	The Order of Things	Michel Foucault	1966	French
67	On the Road	Jack Kerouac	1957	English
68	The Wonderful Adventures of Nils	Selma Lagerlöf	1906–07	Swedish
69	A Room of One's Own	Virginia Woolf	1929	English
70	The Martian Chronicles	Ray Bradbury	1950	English
71	The Ravishing of Lol Stein	Marguerite Duras	1964	French
72	The Interrogation	J. M. G. Le Clézio	1963	French
73	Tropisms	Nathalie Sarraute	1939	French
74	Journal, 1887–1910	Jules Renard	1925	French
75	Lord Jim	Joseph Conrad	1900	English
76	Écrits	Jacques Lacan	1966	French
77	The Theatre and Its Double	Antonin Artaud	1938	French
78	Manhattan Transfer	John Dos Passos	1925	English
79	Ficciones	Jorge Luis Borges	1944	Spanish
80	Moravagine	Blaise Cendrars	1926	French
81	The General of the Dead Army	Ismail Kadare	1963	Albanian
82	Sophie's Choice	William Styron	1979	English
83	Gypsy Ballads	Federico García Lorca	1928	Spanish
84	The Strange Case of Peter the Lett	Georges Simenon	1931	French
85	Our Lady of the Flowers	Jean Genet	1944	French
86	The Man Without Qualities	Robert Musil	1930–42	German
87	Furor and Mystery	René Char	1948	French
88	The Catcher in the Rye	J. D. Salinger	1951	English
89	No Orchids For Miss Blandish	James Hadley Chase	1939	English
90	Blake and Mortimer	Edgar P. Jacobs	1950	French
91	The Notebooks of Malte Laurids Brigge	Rainer Maria Rilke	1910	German
92	Second Thoughts	Michel Butor	1957	French
93	The Origins of Totalitarianism; The Burden of Our Time	Hannah Arendt	1951	English
94	The Master and Margarita	Mikhail Bulgakov	1967	Russian
95	The Rosy Crucifixion	Henry Miller	1949–60	English
96	The Big Sleep	Raymond Chandler	1939	English
97	Amers	Saint-John Perse	1957	French
98	Gaston; Gomer Goof	André Franquin	1957	French
99	Under the Volcano	Malcolm Lowry	1947	English
100	Midnight's Children	Salman Rushdie	1981	English

Note: Classified by the language of the book's first publication, which might not be the author's principal language.

== See also ==
- List of winners and nominated authors of the Booker Prize
- Bokklubben World Library (Norway)
- List of Nobel laureates in Literature (Sweden) – including Camus, Steinbeck, Hemingway, Beckett, Sartre, Solzhenitsyn, Gide, García Márquez, Faulkner, Mauriac, Mann, Pirandello, Böll, Lagerlöf, Le Clézio, and Perse
- List of recipients of the Grand Prize of the Académie française (France) – including de Saint-Exupéry, Cohen, Mauriac, Bernanos, and Tournier
- List of recipients of the Prix Goncourt (France) – including Proust, Malraux, de Beauvoir, Tournier, Gracq, and Duras
- List of recipients of the Prix Renaudot (France) – including Céline, Perec, Aragon, Le Clézio, and Beigbeder
- List of recipients of the Prix mondial Cino Del Duca (France) – including Kundera, Borges, Kadare, and Styron
- List of recipients of the Prix Médicis (France) – including Eco, Perec, and Kundera
- List of recipients of the Pulitzer Prize for Fiction (US) – including Steinbeck, Hemingway, Faulkner, Mitchell, and Styron
- List of recipients of the Neustadt Prize for Literature (US) – including García Márquez and Kadare
- List of recipients of the European Literary Award (Austria) – including de Beauvoir, Eco, Ionesco, Kundera, Duras, and Rushdie
- List of recipients of the Jerusalem Prize (Israel) – including de Beauvoir, Ionesco, Kundera, Borges, and Kadare
- List of recipients of the Strega Prize (Italy) – including Eco, Buzzati, Moravia, and Levi
- List of recipients of the Prince of Asturias Award (Spain) – including Kadare
- List of recipients of the Cervantes Prize (Spain) – including Borges
- Western canon
  - Great Books of the Western World
- Modern Library's 100 Best Novels (US) – all were first published in English
- The Big Read (UK)
