= Tropisms =

1939 novel by Nathalie Sarraute

- First edition cover
- Author: Nathalie Sarraute
- Audio read by: Isabelle Huppert (2009)
- Original title: Tropismes
- Translator: Maria Jolas
- Language: French
- Genre: Nouveau roman
- Publisher: Éditions Denoël
- Publication date: 1939
- Publication place: France
- Dewey Decimal: 843.912
- LC Class: PZ3 .S247 T

Tropisms (French: Tropismes [tʁɔ.pism]) is an experimental novel by Nathalie Sarraute, first published in 1939. It is considered a forerunner of the Nouveau Roman. Jean Genet, Marguerite Duras and Jean-Paul Sartre all described it as a masterpiece.

The title refers to tropisms, stimuli to plant growth; in the human sense, Sarraute imagined tropisms as "interior movements that precede and prepare our words and actions, at the limits of our consciousness."

It was ranked #73 in Le Monde's 100 Books of the Century.

== Content ==
Tropisms consists of twenty-four short vignettes, capturing brief scenes in minute detail.
