= Saint-John Perse =

French poet and diplomat (1887–1975)

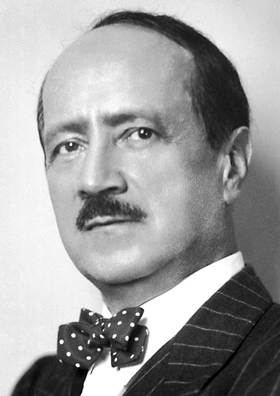
- Perse in 1960
- Born: Alexis Leger; 31 May 1887; Pointe-à-Pitre, Guadeloupe
- Died: 20 September 1975 (aged 88); Giens Peninsula, Provence, France
- Education: University of Bordeaux
- Occupations: Poet, diplomat
- Writing career
- Pen name: Saint-John Perse
- Notable awards: Nobel Prize in Literature; 1960

Alexis Leger (French: [ləʒe]; 31 May 1887 – 20 September 1975), better known by his pseudonym Saint-John Perse ([sɛ̃ d͜ʒɔn pɛʁs]; also Saint-Leger Leger), was a French poet, writer and diplomat, awarded the 1960 Nobel Prize in Literature "for the soaring flight and the evocative imagery of his poetry which in a visionary fashion reflects the conditions of our time".

== Early life ==
Alexis Leger was born in Pointe-à-Pitre, Guadeloupe. His great-grandfather, Prosper Louis Léger, a solicitor, had settled in Guadeloupe in 1815. His grandfather and father were also solicitors; his father was also a member of the city council. The Leger family owned two plantations, one of coffee (La Joséphine) and the other of sugar (Bois-Debout). St. Léger described his childhood on Guadeloupe as "the son of a French family as only the colonials are French". Later on, Léger greatly embellished his family origins by changing his surname to the more aristocratic sounding St Léger-Léger and by claiming that his ancestors were an ancienne noblesse family who had settled in Guadeloupe in the 17th century. The Léger family were well off and Léger had a happy boyhood. Léger was closer to his warm and loving mother than his cold and distant father. The French scholar Marie-Noëlle Little wrote: "Growing up surrounded by the luxurious fauna and flora of the West Indies, Alexis perhaps could not but develop an interest in nature...".

After the Spanish-American War that saw the United States annex Puerto Rico and occupy Cuba, rumors were rampant in the French West Indies that the United States would seize the French colonies in the Caribbean. The year 1899, known as the "year of all dangers", was a period of racial tension on Guadeloupe, with both blacks and whites committing arson in the belief that French rule would soon be ending. The Leger family returned to metropolitan France in 1899 and settled in Pau. The young Alexis felt like an expatriate and spent much of his time hiking, fencing, riding horses, and sailing in the Atlantic. His best subjects as a student were the natural sciences. St Léger always felt very close to nature in general, and he had a special interest in ornithology as birds fascinated him.

St. Léger had a strong sense of being an outsider in France and called himself a "man of the Atlantic" who was equally at home on both sides of the Atlantic. Throughout his life, St Léger had a preference for islands and peninsulas over the mainland, which reflected his sense of being an outsider; his sense of a Guadeloupan identity made him feel that he was very different from other French people. He enrolled at Lycée Louis-Barthou, passed the baccalauréat with honours, and began studying law at the University of Bordeaux. As a university student, St Léger worked as the music critic for the Pau-Gazette. When his father died in 1907, the resulting strain on his family's finances led Leger to temporarily interrupt his studies, but he eventually completed his degree in 1910.

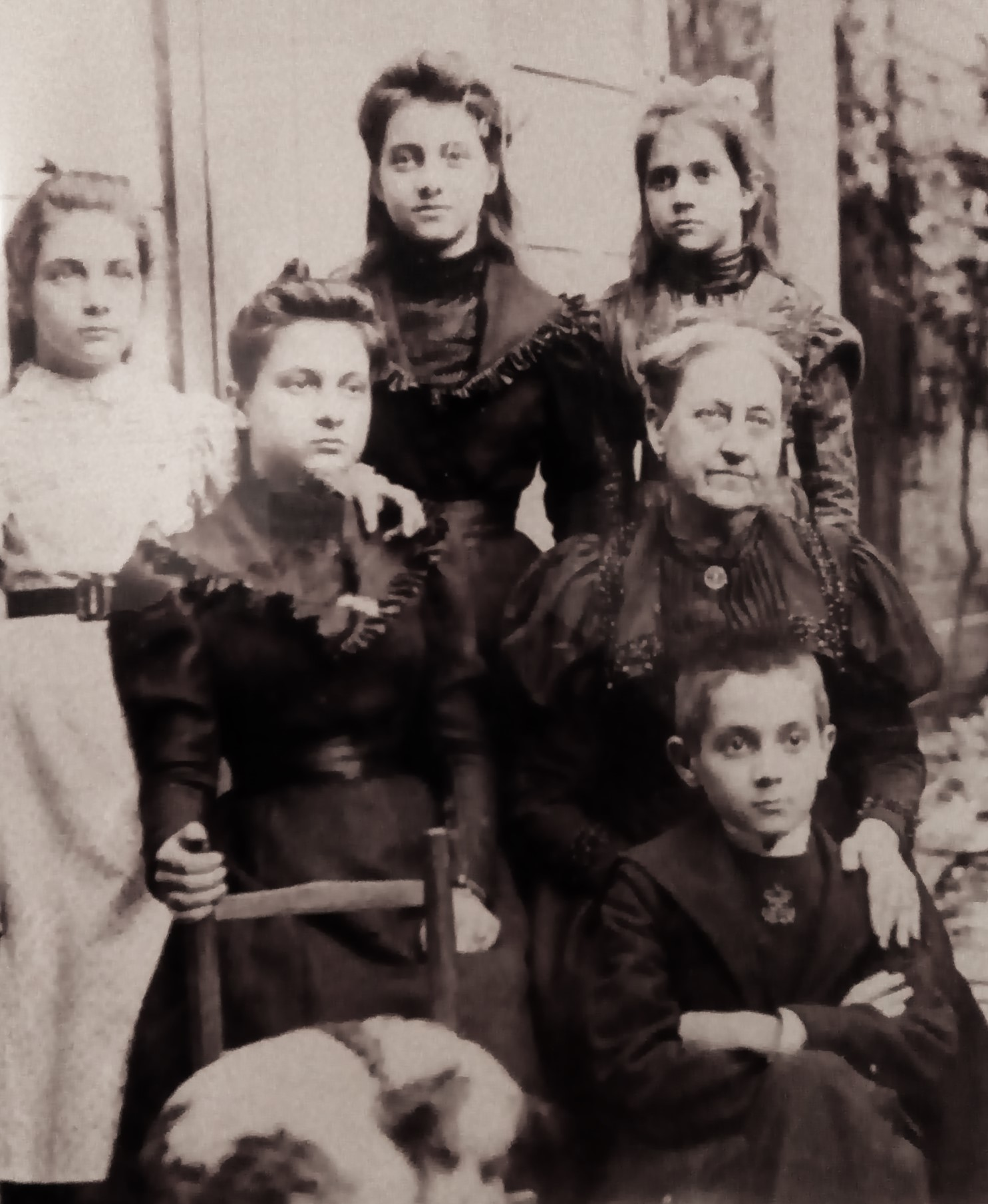
Alexis Léger as a child in Guadeloupe, 1896 with his mother and his sisters.

In 1904, he met the poet Francis Jammes at Orthez, who became a close friend. He frequented cultural clubs and met Paul Claudel, Odilon Redon, Valery Larbaud, and André Gide. He wrote short poems inspired by the story of Robinson Crusoe (Images à Crusoe) and undertook a translation of Pindar. He published his first book of poetry, Éloges, in 1910. The Éloges (Praises) reflected St. Léger's nostalgia for Guadeloupe. The Éloges concern a quest by the narrator for the "other shores", namely outre-mer (a place beyond the sea) and outre-songe (a place beyond dreams). Much of the Éloges are concerned with the lieux de mémoire ("sites of memory") that capture the memories of a past world that no longer exists. At one point, St Léger asks in the Éloges: "Other than childhood, what was there in those days that is here no longer?" The tone in the Éloges is both dreamy and melancholic as the narrator reflects on his longing for the plantation of his childhood, which is depicted as a paradise lost. The house that St. Léger grew up in is depicted in the Éloges as a decaying ruin as his family's plantation is being reclaimed by the jungle, while all of the books in the family library have rotted away. The autobiographical nature of the Éloges is underscored by a major character in the poems, an authoritarian father who owned the plantation, depicted as having omniscient power over both his family and the plantation.

For St. Léger, only poetry endures and allowed him to recapture the memories of a lost world. The front page of the Éloges features the phrase in capital letters "ÉCRIT SUR LA PORTE" ("Written on the door") and the first poem begins with a description of the door to the plantation house under which the same phrase is written. The door serves literally as an entrance to the house and metaphorically as the entrance to the lost world of St Léger's childhood. The chronotope of the Éloges is one where his family's plantation exists in an idealized world severed from any sense of history, which reflected St Léger's discomfort with the fact that his family owned slaves in the past (slavery was abolished in France in 1848). Several passages in the Éloges imply an incestuous relationship between the father and the sister of the narrator, such as the line "a man is hard, his daughter tender"; the way that the sister displaces her mother as the principal lady of the household; and references to a deeply shameful family secret that the narrator cannot bring himself to name.

The Éloges was almost completely ignored at the time; one of the few writers who paid it any attention was Marcel Proust, who praised St. Léger as a creative young poet. An early success for St Léger occurred in 1912 when he, Larbaud, and Gide were elected to the John Donne Club of London, which sought to encourage innovation in poetry. During a visit to London to celebrate his election to the John Donne Club, St. Léger met the Anglo-Polish writer Joseph Conrad, which greatly encouraged him to pursue a career in poetry. Little wrote about his style: "The poet's task, he thought, like the scientist's, was to capture the universe and human consciousness while remaining outside of the literacy currents of the time".

== Diplomatic service ==
In 1914, he joined the French diplomatic service, and spent some of his first years in Spain, Germany and the United Kingdom. When World War I broke out, he was a press corps attaché for the government.

=== China: 1916–1921 ===
From 1916 to 1921, he was secretary to the French embassy in Peking. He had a secret relationship with Madame Dan Pao Tchao (née Nellie Yu Roung Ling), although according to the latter, he was just using her for obtaining information from Peking high society.

During his time in Beijing, he lived in a former Taoist temple and "sat with the philosophers and sages" as he phrased it. Using Beijing as his base, he took trips across the Gobi desert and out to France's Pacific island colonies. St. Léger was fascinated by the Gobi desert, writing to a friend in France that these "desert expanses have exerted a hold on my thoughts, a fascination which approaches hallucination." The American poet Archibald MacLeish wrote that in China St. Léger "learned the art by which a man defends his life from others and even himself". During his time in China, St. Léger wrote his epic poem Anabase. The Anabase ostensibly concerns an expedition from Beijing through the Gobi desert to reach the sea, which serves as a metaphor, as Little phrased it, "an expedition beyond human boundaries, symbolizing man's march through time and space and consciousness." In a letter to André Gide in 1921, he described Beijing as "the astronomical capital of the world, outside of space, outside of time, and ruled by the absolute".

When ordered to return to France, St. Léger took the longest and most convoluted route as he travelled over the course of three months across the Yellow Sea, the Pacific Ocean, and the Atlantic Ocean in seven different ships. Shortly after his return to France, St. Léger was ordered to go to Washington D.C. to attend the naval disarmament conference intended to end the naval arms race between the United States, the United Kingdom, Japan, France, and Italy. The conference was also intended to resolve the Shandong question, as the Japanese had laid claim to the former German rights on the Shandong peninsula, claims that were strongly resisted by China. As an expert on China, St. Léger was ordered by his superiors to attend the conference as part of the French delegation.

=== Secretary to Aristide Briand: 1921–32 ===
In 1921 in Washington, DC, while taking part in a world disarmament conference, he was noticed by Aristide Briand, Prime Minister of France, who recruited him as his assistant. In Paris, he got to know the fellow intellectual poet Larbaud, who used his influence to get the poem Anabase published. Gide, who was serving as the editor of La Nouvelle Revue Française, visited St. Léger and asked him if he had any poems to publish. St. Léger pointed to his trunk and stated: "You may find something in there. Look". Upon opening the trunk, Gide found Anabase. St. Léger was fond of classical music and knew Igor Stravinsky, Nadia Boulanger, and Les Six. In Parisian intellectual and artistic circles, St. Léger was considered to be rising poet, and he maintained a close friendship with Marcel Proust, whose work he in turn much admired. As Proust worked on the later volumes of his magnum opus À la recherche du temps perdu, St. Léger offered him advice and encouragement. Proust paid St. Léger a tribute in the fourth volume of À la recherche du temps perdu, the ominously titled Sodom et Gomorrah, where two servants, Marie Gineste and Céleste Albart, find the Éloges by St. Léger in the bedroom of the narrator. After reading some of his poems, Céleste states that St. Léger has written riddles instead of poems and tosses the book down in disgust. Despite the apparently unflattering nature of the scene, it was a tribute as the message was that only a gifted few could really appreciate St. Léger's poetry.

Anabase was published in 1924 under the pseudonym "Saint-John Perse", which he employed for the rest of his life. He then published nothing for two decades, not even a re-edition of his debut book, as he believed it inappropriate for a diplomat to publish fiction. The Anabase was widely ignored upon publication, but was praised by various poets such as T. S. Eliot, Giuseppe Ungaretti, Hugo von Hofmannsthal, and Rainer Maria Rilke as a poem of much visionary power. Though St. Léger wrote only in French, the critical reception of his poems tended to be more positive abroad than in France. St. Léger's style of poetry, though modernist, was too idiosyncratic to fit into the main currents of poetry in France at the time.

In 1925, he became the chef de cabinet to Briand. St. Léger wrote that Briand had "the boldness of the dream...tempered...by the dictates of common sense" while having the ability to think quickly with the "indifference to the exploitation of success". St. Léger wrote that Briand "had no need of duplicity or violence to win....He hated equally stupidity, cowardice, clumsiness and vulgarity....He hunted with the lightest arms and fished with the finest lines....He brought the refinement of the artist." St. Léger supported Briand's "Locarno policy" of seeking better relations with Weimar Germany. As a senior aide to Briand, St. Léger was involved in the talks that led to the Treaty of Locarno in 1925 and the Kellogg-Briand Pact of 1928. In 1930, St. Léger wrote a memo for Briand that called upon him to use his attendance at the next session of the League of Nations to speak for a "Federal European Union". That same year Eliot translated the Anabase into English, which first introduced St. Léger to an English-speaking audience.

=== Secretary-General of the French Foreign Office: 1932–1940 ===
After Briand's death in 1932, Leger served as the General Secretary (number one civil servant) of the French Foreign Office (Quai d'Orsay) until 1940. St. Léger was a protégé of Philippe Berthelot, the long-time secretary-general all through the 1920s, and when Berthelot was forced to retire in the spring of 1932 due to ill health, St. Léger was his chosen successor. Like Briand and Berthelot, St. Léger was, in the words of the French historian Marguerite Bastid-Bruguiere, a strong believer in international "law and justice" to be enforced by the League of Nations, which he saw as a forum where various international problems could be resolved peacefully via negotiation. Like his mentor Berthelot who also lived in China, St. Léger was a Sinophile and had a strong interest in Chinese culture. St. Léger's great hope as secretary-general was to see the Soviet Union and the United States both join the League. St. Léger was described by the British historian D.C. Watt as the "cold genius" of the Quai d'Orsay, a brilliant diplomat whose intelligence and ruthlessness made him invaluable to successive French foreign ministers over an eight-year period. Watt wrote that St. Léger was an excellent diplomat whose talents were negated by the mostly mediocre foreign ministers he served, but that St. Léger promoted a talented cadre of ambassadors that included René Massigli, Charles Corbin, Robert Coulondre, Émile Naggiar, and François Charles-Roux. The American historian Elizabeth Cameron wrote: "From the start he was no ordinary diplomat. He was a poet, and as a poet, lived in a world not much frequented by other diplomats. But he was also capable of their world, experienced in many worlds, and not least in the worldly society of the French capital. His courtesy was famous, though not always comfortable, and of a kind to put him out of reach. Many and most of all the worldly and the ambitious, were made uneasy by his aloofness, the subtleties of his language, and the sinuous progressions of his thought". The British historian Julien Jackson described St. Léger as a rather mysterious character whose most important belief was that France could not afford to be estranged from Britain. St. Léger had a dark complexion and a popular rumor had it that he was of partially African descent, hence his nickname "le mulâtre du quai d'Orsay" ("the mulatto of the Quai d'Orsay"), which he hated.

The French historian Jean-Baptiste Duroselle described St. Léger as a "strange diplomat". The eccentric St. Léger was especially noted for his obsession with writing long erotic poems which circulated as manuscripts among his friends celebrating the beauty and sensuality of women and the joys of sex, on which he spent a disproportionate amount of time. The diplomat Jean Chauvel wrote that he would appear at the Quai d'Orsay "wearing a narrow black tie, with a pasty face, a veiled look in his eyes, using elegant and refined language in a low voice". Chauvel described St. Léger as a dilettante who talked about Chinese philosophy and poetry just as much as current events. St. Léger normally arrived at work at 11 am, would leave for lunch at noon and only return to the Quai d'Orsay at 4 pm. Despite his diplomatic duties, St. Léger was often at the Café Procope, where he spoke about the latest in the cultural avant-garde with Jean Cocteau, Paul Morand, and Jean Giraudoux. Morand wrote: "I admire his modesty, his broad sweeping views, his elevated and active mind, his playful imagination and mature wisdom like that of an elderly man, his selflessness, his secret life, his unfurnished apartments filled with trunks and his nomadic childhood". The columnist André Géraud (who wrote under the penname Pertinax) wrote that: "He had a deep feeling for the dignity of France, something shared by all the great servants of the State. He was a man of absolute moral and intellectual integrity...Contrary to the accusations that are being leveled, Alexis Léger never took the liberty of trying to impose his own views." Géraud noted that St. Léger had difficult relations with some of the foreign ministers he served, most notably Pierre Laval, Pierre-Étienne Flandin and especially Georges Bonnet, but that he saw it as his duty to "educate" the ministers he served.

The first great crisis faced by St. Léger as secretary-general was the Lytton Report, which had concluded that Japan had committed aggression by seizing Manchuria from China in 1931. In 1931, the Chinese delegation at the League of Nations had accused Japan of aggression by conquering Manchuria, which led the League to appoint a commission under Lord Lytton to determine if Japan had committed aggression or not. St. Léger favored having the League General Assembly "approve" and "adopt" the Lytton report, but then leave the resolution of the Sino-Japanese dispute to the mediation by the powers that had signed the 9-Power Treaty of 1922 plus Germany and the Soviet Union. In a report St. Léger wrote about the crisis in Asia, he described both Japan and China as hostile towards France's special rights in China, but wrote that Japan was by far the more dangerous of the two. St. Léger wrote that ever since the mid-1920s Japan had been "regressing" towards "Asian particularism". St. Léger used as an example of Japan's "regression" the rather violent police campaign against "western decadence" such as young couples kissing in public (traditionally considered to be disgusting behavior in Japan). Beyond a general hostility towards western values, St. Léger wrote that even more disturbing were the claims of an "Asian Monroe Doctrine" in which all of Asia was considered to be Japan's sphere of influence. St. Léger wrote that Japan was steadily moving away from "integration into the entente between the great world powers" and "from the contractual system of the League". He concluded that Japan was conducting "a systematic program of wild imperialism", which he predicted might one day cause a war.

St. Léger advocated that France should vote for sanctions against Japan at the League General Assembly, arguing that this was the best way to stop a war in Asia. St. Léger wrote that the colony of French Indochina, France's other colonies in the Pacific, and its special rights in China, especially the French Concession in Shanghai, were profitable and worth defending against Japan. He also wrote that the main danger to French Indochina was the "reorganization on its border, with or against Japan, of an united and disciplined China". St. Léger argued that French diplomacy had to be careful to not appear to be offering "unqualified approval of Chinese claims and methods" and to avoid a solution that "would push Japan towards extreme methods". As it was, when the Lytton commission report was presented in March 1933, Japan left the League of Nations in protest. St. Léger's advocacy of closer ties with Britain and if possible, the United States were motivated as much by fear of Japan as fear of Germany.

=== From Barthou to Blum ===
Of the all foreign ministers St. Léger served after 1932, he only respected Louis Barthou as he wrote that he had the vision to achieve "the great rules of French diplomacy". St. Léger wrote that he wanted to maintain the Locarno system as he stated: "The structure of Locarno was for a decade our only cornerstone in Europe; the only one which inspired the respect of Hitler by the precision and strictness of its mechanism, the only one which felt obliged to acknowledge officially and repeatedly until the moment which he discerned the inner weaknesses of the beneficiaries of the system". In 1934, Barthou initially considered sacking St. Léger as he believed him to be opposed to his policy of seeking an alliance with the Soviet Union, but changed his mind after he discovered St. Léger was the ideal man to conduct the talks with the Soviets.

Barthou's plans for an "Eastern Locarno"—which were intended as a cover for an alliance with the Soviet Union—created much opposition in Britain. Between 9 and 10 July 1934 a French delegation consisting of Barthou; St. Léger; Charles Corbin, the ambassador in London; the Political Director René Massigli; and Roland de Margerie held a conference in London with the Foreign Secretary Sir John Simon; Sir Robert Vansittart, the Permanent Undersecretary at the Foreign Office; Sir Anthony Eden, the League of Nations minister; Orme Sargent and Lord Stanhope. Simon ridiculed French fears of Nazi Germany, and when Barthou said an "Eastern Locarno" was necessary to protect France and its allies in Eastern Europe, Simon incredulously replied "To protect yourselves from Germany?" Barthou, known as one of the toughest French politicians, dismissed the British objections while St. Léger and Corbin were more conciliatory. St. Léger spoke of: "the fundamental importance that France attached to her friendship with England. She does not want to do anything against Great Britain. Better still, the French government does not wish to get into anything without Great Britain". St. Léger wrote the assassination of Barthou in Marseilles while greeting King Alexander of Yugoslavia who was also killed was a great blow to French diplomacy as he considered Barthou to be the only effective foreign minister he served.

Barthou's successor, Pierre Laval, sought an alliance with Italy and was prepared to cede the Aouzou Strip of French Equatorial Africa to the Italian colony of Libya to win the friendship of Benito Mussolini. St. Léger felt that Laval was far too keen for an agreement with Mussolini as he wrote that he only wanted a voyage de Rome and put little attention to the details of the agreement, which inspired St. Léger to threaten to resign in protest. St. Léger, who went with Laval to Rome for the summit with Mussolini, was excluded from the private meetings where Laval essentially gave Mussolini a free hand to invade Ethiopia. Likewise, St. Léger felt that Laval was too keen to make his voyage de Moscou to meet Joseph Stalin, which St. Léger wrote was for him was merely a voyage de cabotin. When St. Léger objected that more time was needed to prepare for the Franco-Soviet alliance, Laval replied: "Vous couchez avec les affaires".

St. Léger was a close friend of Edvard Beneš, the long-time foreign minister of Czechoslovakia who became president in 1935, and he tended to take a strong pro-Czechoslovak line. The Canadian historian John Cairns described as St. Leger as a "rather strange" character who chose to undercut policy initiatives that he disapproved of. Between 13 and 15 May 1935, St. Léger went to Moscow with the premier of the republic, Pierre Laval, to sign the Franco-Soviet alliance. Foreign visitors were rarely allowed to see Joseph Stalin in the Kremlin, and it was considered a great honor that Laval and the rest of the French visitors were allowed to meet Stalin along with the premier, Vyacheslav Molotov, and the foreign commissar, Maxim Litvinov. As was normally the case, Stalin said little and instead phlegmatically smoked his pipe while Molotov and Litvinov did most of the talking. As Litvinov was fluent in French and was more charming than the "hard man" Molotov, St. Léger spoke to him the most. On the return trip to Paris, St. Léger attended the funeral of Poland's de facto leader, Marshal Józef Piłsudski, in Warsaw and in Berlin attended Laval's meeting with Hermann Göring.

During the Abyssinia Crisis, St. Léger proposed in November 1935 a meeting between British Foreign Secretary Sir Samuel Hoare with Laval. On 7–8 December 1935, Hoare met with Laval in Paris where the two agreed to the Hoare–Laval Pact under which Italy would receive two-thirds of Ethiopia in exchange for ending the war. St. Leger was opposed to the Hoare-Laval Pact that essentially rewarded Italy for invading Ethiopia. He saw Laval's policy of seeking to improve relations with Italy at the expense of Ethiopia as amoral and sabotaged the Hoare-Laval pact by leaking it to the French press. On 13 December 1935, the columnist Geneviève Tabouis in L'Œuvre and the columnist André Géraud who wrote under the pen-name Pertinax in L'Echo de Paris both broke the story of the Hoare-Laval pact, which led to highly negative reactions in both France and the United Kingdom. In London, the news of the Hoare-Laval pact came very close to bringing down the National Government of Stanley Baldwin and Hoare was forced to resign in disgrace, being made the "fall guy" as Baldwin lied to the House of Commons by claiming that Hoare was acting on his initiative.

On 7 March 1936, Germany violated both the Treaty of Versailles and the Treaty of Locarno by the remilitariziation of the Rhineland. St. Léger called for France to respond by sending a military force to evict the Wehrmacht from the Rhineland as he noted the remilitariziation placed France in grave long-term danger. General Maurice Gamelin insisted that only a general mobilization would provide the sufficient force to expel the Wehrmacht from the Rhineland, which as a considerable surprise who thought of a "police operation" to expel the Wehrmacht from the Rhineland. Cameron wrote: "Even severe critics recognize that Léger and the permanent services were determined to preserve demilitarization at whatever cost. Unfortunately, they did not succeed in overcoming the confusions and hesitations which prevailed at the top level". To discuss the crisis, a meeting of the League Council was called in London. Flandin, who replaced Laval as foreign minister, attended the conference along with St. Léger. St. Léger wrote with disgust that Flandin at the conference followed the politique de complaisance and proved all too willing to accept the remilitariziation. St. Léger wrote that the British Foreign Secretary Sir Anthony Eden at the conference rolled "a velvet carpet for retreat" by making vague promises of Anglo-French staff talks in return for French acceptance of the remilitariziation, an offer which Flandin accepted. St. Léger wrote that the French Army should have marched into the Rhineland as he maintained that the British would have then been forced to follow suit.

St. Léger noted that Britain had signed both the Treaty of Versailles and the Treaty of Locarno and argued that British honor would have forced the United Kingdom to follow the lead of France in enforcing both treaties with regard to the Rhineland. St. Léger that it was the remilitariziation of the Rhineland, not the Munich Agreement, that was the turning point in France's fortunes. St. Léger wrote: "It was the London conference of March 1936, not Munich, which must bear the responsibility for Hitler's flooding over the banks". St. Léger noted the remilitariziation of the Rhineland altered the balance of power decisively in favor of the Reich by exposing France once again to the threat of German invasion and by allowing Germany to refortify the Franco-German border. As long as the Rhineland was demilitarized, western Germany was open to a French offensive, which protected France's allies in Eastern Europe such as Czechoslovakia and Poland from German aggression. In his "political testament" written after his return from London, St. Léger wrote that war was "inevitable" as he predicated that Germany would refortify the Franco-German border and invade France's allies in Eastern Europe, secure in the knowledge that the Rhineland would be protected from a French offensive. Despite his belief that war was "inevitable", St. Léger followed a policy he called "irréductible dans l'irrédutiblité" of seeking to best prepare France for the coming conflict.

After the League of Nations sanctions against Italy ended in July 1936, the French tried hard to revive the Stresa Front, displaying "...an almost humiliating determination to retain Italy as an ally". The American historian Brian Sullivan wrote "A.J.P. Taylor erred in asserting that the British and the French drove Mussolini into an alliance with Hitler. Ironically, Mussolini responded to Germany, Britain and France in inverse proportion to their degree of dishonesty and their threat to Italy: Germany, which consistently treated Italy worse than did the other two countries, was rewarded with Mussolini's friendship; France, which generally offered Italy the highest level of co-operation and true partnership, was rewarded with rebuffs and abuse. British policy and Mussolini's reaction to it, fell between these extremes" Both the British and the French very much wanted a rapprochement with Italy to undo the damage caused by the League of Nations sanctions, and Sullivan wrote: "That Mussolini chose to ally with Hitler, rather than being forced.". St. Léger had a very strong dislike of Fascist Italy and consistently opposed the effort to improve relations with Rome as he argued that Mussolini was set upon an anti-French alliance with Germany, and there was nothing that French diplomacy could do to change Mussolini's foreign policy choices.

St. Léger was willing to serve the Front Populaire government of Léon Blum. He described him as "a man of the Left, an opponent of everything antirepublican". During the Spanish Civil War, St. Léger argued very forcefully to Blum that France needed an alliance with Great Britain and that France could not afford a breach with Britain over the issue of Spain. He therefore argued to Blum that France should cease supplying arms to the Spanish Republic and agree to the British plan for arms embargo on both sides.

=== The strong man of the Quai d'Orsay ===
Within the Foreign Office he led the optimist faction that believed that Germany was unstable and that if Britain and France stood up to Hitler, he would back down. In October 1936, St. Léger welcomed the new American ambassador to Paris, William Christian Bullitt Jr. who arrived together with his right-hand man Carmel Offie. St. Léger told Bullitt that the French were greatly pleased that the American president, Franklin D. Roosevelt, had appointed one of his best friends as ambassador to France, saying he regarded this as a sign that Roosevelt placed much great value on Franco-American relations. St. Léger told Bullitt that he was personally happy that Roosevelt had appointed a man fluent in French as ambassador, taking that as another sign that Roosevelt valued France, as for the previous 16 years no American ambassador had spoken French. He also told the openly gay Offie that homosexuality was legal in France. In January 1937, rumors started to appear in the French newspapers that stated the Wehrmacht was operating in Spanish Morocco. The closeness of Spanish Morocco to the Strait of Gibraltar that linked the Mediterranean Sea to the Atlantic Ocean led to a German military presence in Spanish Morocco to be considered unacceptable in both Paris and London. As the Foreign Minister Yvon Delbos was out of Paris, St. Léger was in charge of the Quai d'Orsay and he acted with dispatch, meeting with the German ambassador Count Johannes von Welczeck, where he protested in the strongest terms, saying he regarded a German military presence in Spanish Morocco as a threat to French interests. St. Léger was close to the French ambassador in London, Charles Corbin, and had him secure a promise of British support from Robert Vansittart, the Permanent Undersecretary at the Foreign Office. Cameron noted that the Germans were outraged by St. Léger's démarche writing: "They had felt a strong hand at the helm of French foreign policy and they didn't like it. Thus, the incident added another black mark to their dossier on Léger as a public enemy of the Reich".

=== The Sudetenland crisis ===
On 5 April 1938, St. Léger attended a conference at the Quai d'Orsay concerning Eastern Europe alongside Joseph Paul-Boncour the Foreign Minister; Robert Coulondre, the ambassador in Moscow; Léon Noël, the ambassador in Warsaw; Victor de Lacroix, the minister in Prague; Raymond Brugère, the minister in Belgrade; and Adrien Thierry, the minister in Bucharest. The principal conclusion of the conference was that as long as France's allies in Eastern Europe continued to feud with each other, no resistance to Nazi Germany was possible. The conference ended with a plan being adopted to see it if was possible for King Carol II of Romania to allow the Red Army transit rights across Romania to aid Czechoslovakia in the event of a German invasion, which in turn led to Coulondre and Thierry being assigned to find a way to end the Bessarabia dispute as Carol would not allow the Red Army to enter his kingdom as long as the Soviet Union continued to claim Bessarabia. Much anger was expressed during the conference at the Polish Foreign Minister Colonel Józef Beck, whose attitude towards Czechoslovakia was hostile at best and who was utterly against granting the Red Army transit rights across Poland to aid Czechoslovakia in the event of a German invasion.

On 10 April 1938, a new government under Édouard Daladier was formed. Joseph Paul-Boncour, a foreign minister who St. Léger felt was well meaning but ineffectual, did not retain his portfolio in the new cabinet. Paul-Boncour was replaced with Georges Bonnet, who, St. Léger later wrote, was the worst of the many foreign ministers he served. St. Léger described Bonnet as very intelligent, but secretive, scheming, duplicitous and committed to a policy of ending the French alliance system in Eastern Europe that he was opposed to. One diplomat recalled that Bonnet and St. Léger had "no rapport". St. Léger favored "la ligne anglaise" ("the English line") of seeking closer ties with Britain. St. Léger favored the British policy during the Sudetenland crisis of seeking concessions from Beneš out of the belief that ultimately the Chamberlain government would come to see that Adolf Hitler was the problem in Czechoslovak-German relations after Beneš made enough concessions, and then swing around to the support of Czechoslovakia. He accompanied the French Premier Édouard Daladier at the Munich Conference in 1938, where the timetable of the cession of the Sudetenland region of Czechoslovakia to Germany was agreed to. The British historian Robert Payne wrote: "The hero of the Munich conference was Alexis St. Léger, the permanent secretary of the French Foreign Office, who kept urging Daladier to resist Hitler's demands, but Daladier was too stunned, too sunk in melancholy, to pay much him attention". Paul Schmidt, who served as Hitler's interpreter (Hitler did not speak French), recalled that St. Léger kept raising objections at the Munich Conference, much to Hitler's annoyance.

=== From Munich to Danzig ===
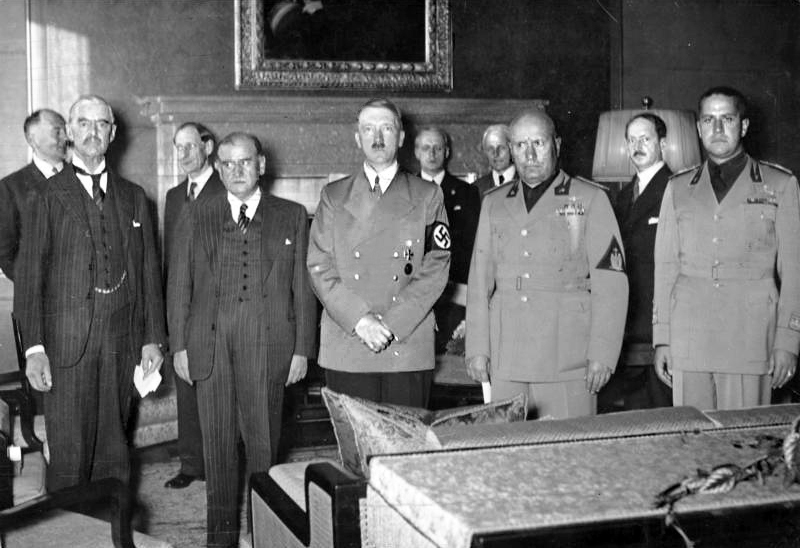
Saint-John Perse attends the negotiations for the Munich Agreement on 29 September 1938. He stands behind Mussolini, right. In the foreground are Neville Chamberlain, Édouard Daladier, Adolf Hitler, Benito Mussolini, and Count Galeazzo Ciano To St. Léger's left are Joachim von Ribbentrop and Ernst von Weizsäcker

In October 1938, the pro-appeasement Foreign Minister Georges Bonnet carried out a purge of the Quai d'Orsay, sidelining a number of officials opposed to his policy. In the aftermath of the purge, Bonnet was congratulated by the equally pro-appeasement British ambassador Sir Eric Phipps for removing the "warmongers" René Massigli and Pierre Comert from the Quai d'Orsay, but he went on to complain that Bonnet should have sacked Secretary-General St. Léger as well. In response, Bonnet claimed that he and St. Léger saw "eye to eye" about the policy to be pursued towards Germany and Italy. Phipps, who knew about the true state of relations between the two, drily noted that "in that case the eyes must be astigmatic". In fact, Bonnet had very much wanted to sack St. Léger, but the latter was protected by his friendship with Daladier. Phipps-who believed that appeasement was the only way to save Western civilization-greatly disliked St. Léger for his anti-appeasement views. On 24 October 1938, Phipps reported to Lord Halifax: "I saw him [St. Léger] this afternoon and found him convinced as ever that no arrangement could be reached between France and Germany or Italy. In fact, his point of view remains entirely sterile". Contrary to Bonnet's policy of seeking to end the French alliance system in Eastern Europe, in November 1938, St. Léger played a key role in sending out a French mission to Yugoslavia, Romania and Bulgaria to increase French economic influence in the Balkans.

On 6 December 1938, St. Léger was present in the Clock Room of the Quai d'Orsay standing alongside Count von Welczeck as he watched the Declaration of Franco-German Friendship that was signed by Bonnet and the German Foreign Minister Joachim von Ribbentrop. St. Léger was shocked that Ribbentrop brought along with him to Paris 600 academic experts, who played no role during the Franco-German summit, and whose only purpose was to show the power of Ribbentrop. During the visit of Ribbentrop, he and Bonnet went out for a walk in the Tuileries Garden where Bonnet was said to have told Ribbentrop that the French alliance system in Eastern Europe was over and that France now recognized Eastern Europe as being within Germany's exclusive sphere of influence. St. Léger who was present during the walk in the Tuileries Garden denied that Bonnet made that claim and instead stated that Bonnet had actually said was that France now recognized Czecho-Slovakia as being in the German sphere of influence. Regardless of what Bonnet actually said, Ribbentrop upon his return to Berlin told Hitler that France now accepted that Eastern Europe was within the sphere of influence of the Reich and there was no danger of France going to war for Poland.

When Germany violated the Munich Agreement on 15 March 1939 by occupying the Czech half of Czecho-Slovakia which was turned into the Protectorate of Bohemia and Moravia, St. Léger was outraged and argued that Robert Coulondre, the ambassador in Berlin, should be recalled in protest to show the Germans "the seriousness of the situation". In an unusual move, he met privately with Daladier to complain about "the weak attitude and hesitancy of M. Bonnet, and against his being himself 'surrounded with reticence'" as he charged that Bonnet kept him in the dark about what he was doing. When Bonnet went to London to see Chamberlain and Lord Halifax four days later, St. Léger was ordered to stay in Paris as Bonnet felt that St. Léger would take a different line with the British than what he favored. In a memo he wrote about the "probable attitude" of Britain and Poland, St. Léger wrote that the foreign policy of Colonel Beck was entirely "cynical and false", and that Beck wanted a military alliance with Britain, which he believed the British would refuse. St. Léger further predicated that Beck would follow his usual "hand-to-mouth policy" and moved closer to the Reich when the Chamberlain government refused to "undertake a definite commitment" to defend Poland. Regarding the United Kingdom, St. Léger predicated that "France and Great Britain were at the turning of the road".

=== The Danzig crisis ===
During the Danzig crisis, St. Léger very much favored Daladier's plans for a "peace front" of the Soviet Union, France and the United Kingdom to deter Germany from invading Poland. During the Tilea Affair of March 1939 when France's ally Romania appeared to be on the brink of a German invasion to seize its oil wells, St. Léger was furious with Colonel Beck, whose statements implied that Poland would not assist Romania as Beck noted that the Romanian-Polish alliance only applied against the Soviet Union, not Germany. At a meeting with Juliusz Łukasiewicz, the Polish ambassador in Paris, St. Léger expressed his rage, saying: "Poland refuses to join France and England in protecting Romania". St. Léger sent a long letter to both the British Foreign Secretary Lord Halifax and the prime minister Neville Chamberlain that denounced Colonel Beck as a ruthless, unscrupulous and devious opportunist whose word was not to be trusted and who was about to ally Poland to the Reich. At a meeting with Phipps, St. Léger expressed the hope that Britain would not "put the cart before the horse" by subordinating decision-making to King Carol II of Romania, whom St. Léger distrusted almost as much as he distrusted Beck. St. Léger had a dismissive view of France's allies in Eastern Europe as he told Phipps: "These governments would decide their attitude in accordance with the intentions of France and Great Britain. In any case, they were only what he called 'corollaries'".

Starting on 18 March 1939, St. Léger took to cultivating American public opinion by using 25,000 francs to cover the travel expenses of various English-speaking French cultural figures such as André Maurois, Ève Curie, Jules Romains, and Georges Duhamel to tour the United States. St. Léger believed that the promise of American support would be essential to allow France to face the Reich in the Danzig crisis, and he felt that such cultural diplomacy using the historical relationship between France and the United States as well as their shared democratic values would win the American public over to a more favorable view of France. Much to St. Léger's surprise, on 31 March 1939, Chamberlain reversed his longstanding policy of "no commitments beyond the Rhine" by announcing in the House of Commons the famous British "guarantee" of Poland.

In the Danzig crisis, relations between Bonnet and Daladier became increasing strained and hostile as the two men held diametrically opposed views about whether France should go to war for Poland. Starting in April 1939, Daladier worked to marginalise Bonnet by dealing directly with St. Léger and entirely bypassing the foreign minister. St. Léger knew from the reports of the Deuxième Bureau that the Chamberlain government was deeply worried about the prospect of Japan taking advantage of a war in Europe to seize Britain's Asian colonies and threaten Australia and New Zealand, and wanted American support in the Pacific. On 11 April 1939, Lord Halifax wrote to U.S. President Franklin D. Roosevelt asking him to move the U.S. Atlantic fleet to the Pacific to dissuade the Japanese from taking advantage of the Danzig crisis, a request that Roosevelt refused. Knowing that the British would be more active in Europe if the Americans were more involved in Asia, St. Léger met with William Christian Bullitt Jr., the American ambassador in Paris and a close friend of Roosevelt's, to tell him that the Deuxième Bureau was aware of a secret German-Japanese plan that Japan would attack the European colonies in Asia the moment Germany invaded Poland. Leveraging American stereotypes of Britain, St. Léger told Bullitt that pressure from the city had led Chamberlain to decide to send the main part of the Royal Navy to Singapore (the major British naval base in Asia) and accordingly the Danzig crisis was more likely to end in war. Bullitt—who talked on the telephone on a daily basis with Roosevelt—accordingly passed on these claims to Roosevelt, who reversed himself and ordered much of the U.S. Atlantic fleet transferred over to the Pacific fleet. St. Léger himself was concerned about the Japanese as he noted that in February 1939 the Japanese had occupied the Spratly Islands in the South China Sea, which placed Japanese forces very close to French Indochina while France could spare no naval forces for Asia because of the crisis in Europe.

On 14 April 1939, Roosevelt wrote to Hitler asking him to promise not to attack any more countries. On 28 April 1939, Hitler in an address to the Reichstag mocked Roosevelt by reading out the response of 34 world leaders who provided the polite answer to requests from German diplomats that their nations did not feel threatened by Germany (though notably the United Kingdom, France, Poland and the Soviet Union were absent from Hitler's list). In the aftermath of Hitler's speech, St. Léger told Bullitt that Hitler in his speech had responded to Roosevelt's request to settle the Danzig crisis peacefully by renouncing the German-Polish nonaggression pact; that the tone of Hitler's speech was notably bellicose; and that Hitler had no notion of justice as proven by his "enslavement" of the Czech people. For all these reasons, St. Léger predicated that Hitler wanted war over Danzig and asked Bullitt to use his influence with Roosevelt to persuade the president to ask Congress to amend the American Neutrality acts. On 29 April 1939, Bonnet met the Soviet ambassador Jakob Suritz who complained about the "absence of reciprocity in obligations" in Bonnet's draft treaty for an Anglo-Soviet-French alliance. Bonnet quite causally claimed to be ignorant of what the draft treaty stated and blamed St. Léger, whom he stated was incompetent and not capable of writing treaties properly.

Between 16 and 19 May 1939, a Polish delegation led by the Military Affairs Minister, General Tadeusz Kasprzycki, visited Paris to strengthen the Franco-Polish alliance; to work out staff plans if Germany did invade Poland; and to facilitate French arms shipments to Poland. General Maurice Gamelin and Kasprzycki signed a military accord, which remained a dead letter as no political accord was signed. Bonnet claimed to Gamelin that the political accord was not ready to be signed as the staff of the Quai d'Orsay needed more time for the text, but Gamelin discovered that claim was a lie as he phoned St. Léger who stated that he and the rest of the Quai d'Orsay staff had prepared the political accord several weeks before the Polish delegation arrived. Daladier was on holiday in the south of France, and by the time Gamelin and St. Léger were able to contact him via phone, Kasprzycki and the rest of the Polish delegation had left Paris. Gamelin was stunned by the lengths that Bonnet was prepared to go to find a way to end the alliance with Poland, but St. Léger informed him that this was the norm with Bonnet.

St. Léger had anti-clerical views and was strongly opposed to the offer of Pope Pius XII to mediate an end to the Danzig crisis. St. Léger told Phipps that most of the senior officials in the Catholic Church hierarchy were closeted gay men who had been blackmailed into working for the Fascist regime. St. Léger called the Pope's mediation offer a power play by Mussolini, and stated that Cardinal Maglione, the right-hand man of the Pontiff, was acting as an Italian rather than as an agent of the Vatican. St. Léger ended by saying the Vatican should restrict itself to appeals for peace "on a general basis and usual plane for peace" and to "not get involved in political matters which it should leave to the Chancelleries."

French decision-makers were far more keen than British decision-makers to have the Soviet Union join the "peace front" to protect Poland, and St. Léger was annoyed with the attitude of Chamberlain who continued to insist that Britain would never sign a military alliance with the Soviet Union. On 20 May 1939, Lord Halifax stopped in Paris on his way to Geneva to attend the spring session of the League of Nations. During this stopover, Halifax was confronted by Daladier, Bonnet, and St. Léger who told him very firmly that only a military alliance with the Soviet Union could stop Germany from invading Poland, and warned him if Chamberlain continued his foot-dragging, the result would be war in 1939. Halifax came away from his meeting in Paris converted to the French point-of-view and upon his return to London stated that Britain should start talks for an alliance with Moscow. St. Léger very much expected the Anglo-French-Soviet talks for an alliance to be successful. In a meeting with Bullitt on 28 June 1939 St. Léger stated he believed that "there were eighty chances in a hundred" that the Anglo-French-Soviet talks "would be successfully concluded in the near-future". On 30 June 1939, St. Léger told Bullitt that the best hope of stopping the Danzig crisis from turning into a war were an alliance with the Soviet Union and American military aid to France, especially aircraft. St. Léger warned Bullitt that Hitler seemed very intent on invading Poland and that the only way to stop him would be to amend the American neutrality acts to allow France to buy modern American aircraft and for a "peace front" of the Soviet Union, France and Great Britain.

Ever since the Abyssinia crisis of 1935–1936, it had been French policy to repair relations with Italy, which St. Léger disliked. French plans for a war with Germany required bringing over soldiers from Algeria and the rest of the Maghreb to compensate for the numerical superiority of the Wehrmacht, and the possibility of the Regia Marina cutting France off from the Maghreb was considered very concerning in Paris. In a memo, St. Léger wrote that Benito Mussolini had evidently decided upon alignment with Germany and that: "Every effort to bring them [the Italians] back to us is destined to fail; it will only encourage them in their two-faced policy, leading them to name the highest price for their assets and making them value even more highly the benefits the Axis could offer them". St. Léger complained that allies of Bonnet in his "peace lobby" such as the Public Works minister Anatole de Monzie were holding unofficial talks with Italian diplomats on their own, which he felt was Bonnet's way of cutting out the Quai d'Orsay from his foreign policy. André François-Poncet, the French ambassador in Rome, was opposed to St. Léger's policy and felt it was still possible to "detach" the Italians from an alliance with Germany. St. Léger ordered François-Poncet to stick to his "day-to-day business", which led François-Poncet to lash out against him as he told the Italian Foreign Minister Count Galeazzo Ciano that St. Léger was a "sinister man" opposed to better Franco-Italian relations. Phipps had served as the British ambassador in Berlin between 1933 and 1937 where he became a close friend of François-Poncet, who served as the French ambassador in Berlin between 1931 and 1938. All through the spring and summer of 1939, Phipps wrote letters to François-Poncet that accused St. Léger of "Italophobia" and of being rigidly hostile towards the Fascist regime as Phipps noted that St. Léger disliked Mussolini as a person. Both Phipps and François-Poncet believed it was possible to "detach" Fascist Italy from alignment with Nazi Germany, and both felt that St. Léger was the principle man blocking rapprochement with Italy. Cameron wrote that events proved St. Léger correct about Italy as even though the French did not make the concessions to the Italians that Bonnet and François-Poncet favored, Italy still remained neutral when the war began and only entered the war on 10 June 1940 when it was already clear that France was defeated.

St. Léger very much welcomed the change in British policy during the Danzig crisis, as he noted the lack of British support in 1938 had made it "impossible" for France to face Germany on its own. Despite his dislike of Colonel Beck, St. Léger favored a policy of Britain and France making generous loans to Poland to assist with the modernization of the Polish military "...at once in order to convince the Germans that France and England are determined to support Poland if Poland should become involved in a war with Germany". On 21 July 1939, St. Léger told Philps that Daladier was "firmly convinced of the necessity of showing an irreducible refusal to treat with a regime [Nazi Germany] in whose word no confidence could be placed and with which any treaty must be valueless...so convinced was Daladier of the wisdom of an attitude of determined reserve that he had even given orders against any manifestations of friendship towards Germany such as mutual visits for athletic contests and such like: it was better for the time being to renounce the natural instinct to act en gentleman". On 2 August 1939, Bonnet told Philps that his main enemies in the cabinet were Daladier, the Finance minister Paul Reynaud, the Navy minister César Campinchi, the Interior minister Albert Sarraut, and the Colonial Minister Georges Mandel. Bonnet further stated that his enemies within the Quai d'Orsay were St. Léger (whom Bonnet accused of being very disloyal to him) along with Robert Coulondre, the ambassador in Berlin and Charles Corbin, the ambassador in London as he noted that both Coulondre and Corbin were friends of St. Léger.

On 3 August 1939, St. Léger learned from French intelligence sources about the British negotiating tactics for the mission to Moscow, which as defined by Lord Halifax stated: "The British delegation is to conduct negotiations very slowly, keeping abreast of the political discussions". By contrast, the French favored the negotiations for the "peace front" to be completed as soon as possible. The two differing tempo of negotiations favored by the British and French reflected their views on the ultimate desirability of reaching an understanding with the Reich or not. For Chamberlain and Lord Halifax, the mere act of engaging in negotiations with the Soviet Union was felt to be sufficient to deter Germany from invading Poland, and to actually create the "peace front" was felt to be counterproductive as it would make it more difficult to reach a "general settlement" with Germany. For the French, the "peace front" was felt to be the only way of deterring Germany from invading Poland, and both Daladier and St. Léger, though not Bonnet, had little hope of the same sort of understanding with Germany that the British favored. The French delegation to Moscow headed by General Joseph Doumenc first went to London to join the British delegation led by Admiral Reginald Plunkett-Ernle-Erle-Drax to travel together in a sign of solidarity. The two delegations boarded a slow-moving ship, the City of Exeter, that moved at only 13 knots per hour to take them to Leningrad (modern St. Petersburg) and hence to Moscow. In common with other French officials, St. Léger was very much enraged at Colonel Beck who was completely against allowing the Red Army to enter Poland if Germany should invade while the Soviets insisted on such transit rights as the precondition for the "peace front". In Moscow, Marshal Kliment Voroshilov, the Soviet defense commissar, had told General Doumenc that his government regarded the issue of transit rights as of paramount importance as he insisted that if the French could not pressure the Poles into granting transit rights for the Red Army, then as far as he was concerned France was not serious about the "peace front".

On 22 August 1939, St. Léger advised the French cabinet that France should issue a threatening démarche in Warsaw to force Beck to allow the Red Army transit rights as he argued that the issue was on the verge of causing the proposed "peace front" to collapse. The Ribbentrop-Molotov non-aggression pact of 23 August 1939 stunned French decision-makers and is known in France as "the diplomatic Waterloo of French history" as the French never saw it coming. The executive decision-makers in Paris had always expected the "peace front" to be created in one form or another, and the Molotov-Ribbentrop pact came as a shocking and most unpleasant surprise in Paris. In desperation, Daladier ordered General Joseph Doumenc to tell the lie that Beck had finally granted the transit rights. Because such hopes had been invested in the "peace front" in France, the debate over who was responsible for its failure was especially bitter. Reynaud accused St. Léger of being the man responsible for the failure to create the "peace front" as he accused St. Léger of moving too slowly and of not doing enough to pressure Colonel Beck to grant transit rights to the Red Army. On 25 August 1939, Daladier told Łukasiewicz that he was not to talk to Bonnet under any conditions, saying the views of the Foreign Minister regarding the Danzig crisis were not his own, and told the Polish ambassador to only talk to himself or St. Léger. At a cabinet meeting of 31 August 1939, Daladier was described as having "bristled like a hedgehog" at the cabinet meeting as he exploded in rage at Bonnet as he warned the planned conference was a "trap" and he accused Bonnet of sullying France's honor with his opposition to declaring war. At a crucial moment, Daladier read out a letter from Coulondre that St. Léger had kept secret from Bonnet that won over the majority of the French cabinet to Daladier's position.

After Germany invaded Poland on 1 September 1939, Mussolini proposed a peace conference to stop the war. Bonnet, who wanted to avoid declaring war on Germany, saw Mussolini's proposal as a way to avoid war. In an effort to sabotage Bonnet's plans, St. Léger had Corbin tell Lord Halifax later on the afternoon of 1 September that the British and French governments should place a time limit on Mussolini's proposed conference, saying that otherwise the Germans would stall and the war would continue. This message to Corbin was the precise opposite of what Bonnet had wanted Corbin to tell Lord Halifax. Faced with a choice between obeying the foreign minister and the secretary-general, Corbin chose the latter. At a crucial meeting of the French cabinet, Bonnet argued that France should not declare war on Germany and instead embrace Mussolini's conference. Before the meeting, St. Léger had briefed Daladier and warned him that the conference was merely a trick to prevent France and Britain from declaring war as Germany would continue the war against Poland while the preparations for the conference continued, quite possibly for months. In a memo to Daladier, St. Léger wrote that it was unacceptable to be holding a peace conference while the Reich was waging war on Poland as he concluded:

"If such negotiations were to be started by a retreat on the part of the Allies and under the threat of German force, the democracies would soon find themselves faced with wholly unacceptable Axis terms. There would be war anyway and under especially unfavorable conditions. No, the trap is too obvious".

In an unusual move, Bonnet denounced St. Léger in a press conference for having sabotaged his policy as he contended that Mussolini's peace conference would have ended the war.

When the declaration of war was finally drafted by Bonnet, it evaded the expression la guerre and instead spoke in convoluted terms that France "would fulfil those obligations contracted towards Poland, which the German government is aware of". Even then, Bonnet in an attempt to avoid war ordered Coulondre to set the expiry of the ultimatum for 5: 00 am on 4 September 1939. Coulondre phoned St. Léger in Paris to ask what he should do if Ribbentrop should try to stall him, which led St. Léger to order him to treat any stalling as a negative reply. At that point, Bonnet took the phone from St. Léger to tell Coulondre that the expiry of the ultimatum was to be moved up to 5 pm on 3 September 1939.

=== Dismissal ===
On 13 September 1939, Daladier finally fired Bonnet as Foreign Minister as he stated that Bonnet's foreign policy was not his foreign policy. As Daladier was also the premier, he did not have much time for diplomacy and St. Léger was the de facto French foreign minister until May 1940. Daladier usually met daily with St. Léger and Coulondre, who was regarded as the German expert within the Quai d'Orsay, and tended to follow their advice. In February 1940, Sumner Welles, the undersecretary of state, visited the major European capitals on a peace mission for President Roosevelt. During Welles's visit to Paris, St. Léger told him: "The game is lost. France is alone against three dictators. Great Britain is not ready and the United States has not even amended the neutrality act. Once again, the democracies have arrived too late". It is unlikely that this statement represented St. Léger's real feelings and was more likely a gambit to try to force the Roosevelt administration to provide more aid to France. Welles wrote he was struck by "magnificent clarity and logic" shown by St. Léger just as he had "as always shown" and by the "innately liberal nature of his political philosophy". Relations between France and Britain were often strained during the winter of 1939–1940 and in March 1940 Daladier told St. Léger "that what had really taken the stuffing out of him was his loss of faith in his ability ever to induce the British government to take prompt action or a firm line".

St. Léger was close to Daladier, and after the fall of the Daladier government in March 1940, he was out of favor with the new premier Paul Reynaud. Reynaud's mistress, the Comtesse Hélène de Portes had a particular dislike of St. Léger and lobbied her lover very strongly to dismiss him as the secretary-general of the Quai d'Orsay. On 16 May 1940, the Wehrmacht won the Second Battle of Sedan and broke through the French lines along the Meuse river, throwing Paris into a state of panic as it was believed that the capital would fall within hours. St. Léger oversaw the burning of the records of the Quai d'Orsay which were thrown into a giant bonfire in the garden of the Ministry of Foreign Affairs. Reynaud reshuffled his cabinet on 18 May 1940 and appointed Daladier as the new foreign minister. Portes lobbied Reynaud to dismiss St. Léger before Daladier arrived at the Quai d'Orsay, saying that the "Léger scalp" was worth 70 votes in the chambre des députés. On the morning of 19 May 1940 St. Léger learned from reading the morning newspaper that he had just been fired as secretary-general. Georges Mandel, the minister of colonies, was opposed to St. Léger's sacking, telling Reynaud that firing a senior diplomat well known for his anti-Nazi views, was sending the wrong message. In mid-July 1940, Leger began a long exile in Washington, DC.

== Exile ==
In 1940, the Vichy government dismissed him from the Légion d'honneur order and revoked his French citizenship (it was reinstated after the war). Likewise, all of St. Léger's assets were confiscated. St. Léger's apartment on the Avenue de Camoëns in Paris was looted by the Wehrmacht who burned several of his unpublished poems, much to his distress when he learned that his poems were now lost forever. Found inside of St. Léger's apartment was a copy of the Treaty of Versailles on which the German soldiers mocking wrote: "Much good may it do you now, last defender of the last French victory!" St. Léger was opposed to Vichy, but did not support the movement led by General Charles de Gaulle. He was in some financial difficulty as an exile in Washington until Archibald MacLeish, the director of the Library of Congress and himself a poet, raised enough private donations to enable the library to employ him until his official retirement from the French civil service in 1947. He declined a teaching position at Harvard University.

During his American exile, he wrote his long poems Exil, Vents, Pluies, Neiges, Amers, and Chronique. In March 1942, his long lyrical poem Exil (Exile) was published in Chicago in the magazine Poetry. Exil was in many ways his most personal poem as St. Léger recounted his deep longing for France amid his concerns that he would never see France again. In a long letter to MacLeish written later in 1942, St. Léger declared "La France est moi-même et tout moi-même" ("France is myself and everything for me"). In the same letter, he wrote about his love of the French language, which for him was a refuge from a world gone mad. St. Léger stated that for him: "...la langue française le seul refuge imaginable, le seul lieu où je puisse me tenir pour y rien comprendre" ("the French language is the only refuge imaginable, the only place where I am able to understand anything"). During the war, he served as an unofficial adviser on French affairs to President Franklin D. Roosevelt. During the war, St. Léger found himself caught between the feud between Roosevelt's two closest advisers on foreign affairs, the Undersecretary of State, Sumner Welles, and his archenemy, William Christian Bullitt Jr., the former ambassador to the Soviet Union and France (Roosevelt had little respect for the Secretary of State, Cordell Hull). Bullitt tried very hard to have Welles fired for being gay after he discovered that Welles had propositioned two Afro-American railroad porters in 1940. Despite the feud, St. Léger tried his best to stay on good terms with Welles and Bullitt.

He remained in the US long after the end of the war. In France, St. Léger became known as le grand absent. In an attempt to encourage St. Léger to return to France, in 1950 the prestigious Cahiers de la Pléiade devoted an entire issue to St. Léger with articles by André Gide, Paul Claudel, Stephen Spender, Archibald MacLeish, Allen Tate, René Char, Renato Poggioli, André Breton, Jorge Guillén, and Giuseppe Ungaretti that all discussed his influence upon their work. He travelled extensively, observing nature and enjoying the friendship of US Attorney General Francis Biddle and his spouse, the author Katherine Garrison Chapin, as well as of philanthropist Beatrice Chanler,. During his American exile, he increasing turned to nature for the themes of his poems. In his 1943 poem Pluies the subject was rain; in his 1944 poem Neiges the subject was snow; in his 1946 poem Vents the subject was the wind; in his 1957 poem Amers the subject was the sea; and in his 1959 Chronique the subject was the earth. St. Léger was called by the Swedish poet Erik Lindegren "the Linnaeus of modern poetry" owing to his fondness of classifying elements of nature in his poems.

He was on good terms with the UN Secretary General and author Dag Hammarskjöld. Hammarskjöld had majored in French literature as a student at the University of Uppsala and always followed very closely developments in French literature despite his duties at the United Nations. In 1955, Hammarskjöld visited Beijing to meet the Chinese Premier Zhou Enlai to negotiate the freedom of 15 United States Air Force pilots shot down during the Korean War who were still imprisoned by the Chinese in violation of the 1953 armistice. Hammarskjöld stated that his visit to Beijing constantly made him think of Anabase, a poem that he greatly admired (Hammarskjöld was fluent in French), which led him to inquire if were possible to meet St. Léger. After his return from Beijing, Hammarskjöld wrote: "Subconsciously, my reaction to the Peking landscape was certainly favored by the Anabase. On the other hand, after reading Anabase after having seen northern China, it is a new poem-an overwhelming one also in its extraordinary synthesis of the very soul of that part of the world". To improve his chances of winning the Nobel prize, Lindegren translated the Anabase into Swedish for the benefit of the members of the Royal Swedish Academy. The Swedish composer Karl-Birger Blomdahl in a letter to St. Léger wrote that he had just read the Anabase in its Swedish translation and asked for permission to set this "magnificent work" to music, but with the lyrics all in French. St. Léger, who believed that his poems were incapable of being translated because their "internal metrics" could be only rendered in French, granted his permission to Blomdahl. However, in his letter granting permission to Blomdahl, St. Léger wrote that the Anabase was set in China, but not about China as he wrote that the Anabase should "always be thought of as outside the boundaries of space and time, as ruled by the absolute".

St. Léger first met Hammarskjöld in New York on 30 November 1955, where he gave him a copy of his poetry entitled "To Dag Hammarskjöld, the Magician" (a reference to Hammarskjöld's success in persuading the Chinese to release the 15 American airmen). On 19 December 1955, Hammarskjöld wrote in a letter to a friend: "A couple of times recently I had the pleasure of meeting Léger. I was very happy to get to know him. What a remarkable man!" Hammarskjöld used his influence in Sweden to join the campaign to have the Royal Swedish Academy award St. Léger the Nobel Prize in literature. On 23 December 1955, Hammarskjöld wrote to Andreas Österling, the secretary of the Royal Swedish Academy: "I recently had the chance to meet Alexis Leger and have seen him since then a couple of times. He is an extraordinary man, simple and warm, of great knowledge and vast experience, with such a talant of a storyteller as I have never seen before".

The British diplomat Brian Urquhart who knew both St. Léger and Hammarskjöld wrote in 2001: "Dag Hammarskjöld was one of that rare and fascinating breed, an intellectual and aesthete who is also a man of action. As Secretary-General, Hammarskjöld sometimes seemed intimidatingly self-sufficient and omniscient. Since he was an almost obsessively private person, it only became generally known only after his death he had relied upon a few carefully selected friends both for advice and support in his public responsibilities and for regular exchanges on the intellectual and aesthetic matters that were his main recreation and pleasure". St. Léger as an experienced diplomat and poet was one of Hammarskjöld's closest friends. Hammarskjöld as the United Nations Secretary-General had difficult relations with Nikita Khrushchev and Charles de Gaulle. The Francophile Hammarskjöld was especially pained by the criticism coming from de Gaulle, and he turned to St. Léger for support as Urquhart noted that he saw St. Léger as "...the embodiment of the France he so deeply admired". Hammarskjöld felt that de Gaulle was insufficiently understanding of the newly independent nations of Africa and Asia, and often wrote to St. Léger for his moral support.

== Return to France ==
In 1957, American friends gave him a villa at Giens, Provence, France. He then split his time between France and the United States. In 1958, he married the American Dorothy Milburn Russell. In 1960, he was awarded the Nobel Prize in Literature. In 1961, the American poet Wallace Fowlie praised St. Léger for his ability to capture in his poems "the inexplicable emotion, the personal trait, the fleeting intuition". After receiving the Nobel Prize, he wrote the long poems Chronique, Oiseaux and Chant pour un équinoxe and the shorter Nocturne and Sécheresse. In 1962, Georges Braque worked with master printmaker Aldo Crommelynck to create a series of etchings and aquatints, L'Ordre des Oiseaux, which was published with the text of Perse's Oiseaux by Au Vent d'Arles.

A few months before he died, Leger donated his library, manuscripts and private papers to Fondation Saint-John Perse, a research centre devoted to his life and work (Cité du Livre, Aix-en-Provence), which remains active to the present day. He died in his villa in Giens and is buried nearby.

== Works ==
- Éloges (1911, transl. Eugène Jolas in 1928, Louise Varèse in 1944, Eleanor Clark and Roger Little in 1965, King Bosley in 1970)
- Anabase (1924, transl. T.S. Eliot in 1930, Roger Little in 1970; revised and corrected edition, often referred to as the "third edition," was published by Faber and Faber in 1959)
- Exil (1942, transl. Denis Devlin, 1949)
- Pluies (1943, transl. Denis Devlin in 1944)
- Poème à l'étrangère (1943, transl. Denis Devlin in 1946)
- Neiges (1944, transl. Denis Devlin in 1945, Walter J. Strachan in 1947)
- Vents (1946, transl. Hugh Chisholm in 1953)
- Amers (1957, transl. Wallace Fowlie in 1958, extracts by George Huppert in 1956, Samuel E. Morison in 1964)
- Chronique (1960, transl. Robert Fitzgerald in 1961)
- Poésie (1961, transl. W. H. Auden in 1961)
- Oiseaux (1963, transl. Wallace Fowlie in 1963, Robert Fitzgerald in 1966, Roger Little in 1967, Derek Mahon in 2002)
- Pour Dante (1965, transl. Robert Fitzgerald in 1966)
- Chanté par celle qui fut là (1969, transl. Richard Howard in 1970)
- Chant pour un équinoxe (1971)
- Nocturne (1973)
- Sécheresse (1974)
- Collected Poems (1971) Bollingen Series, Princeton University Press.
- Œuvres complètes (1972), Bibliothèque de la Pléiade, Gallimard. The definitive edition of his work. Leger designed and edited this volume which includes a detailed chronology of his life, speeches, tributes, hundreds of letters, notes, a bibliography of the secondary literature, and extensive extracts of literature the author admired and was influenced by. Enlarged edition, 1982.

== Homages ==
- A bronze monument, Hommage à Saint-John Perse, sculpted by Patrice Alexandre (ordered by the French Ministry of Culture in 1985), was inaugurated in 1992 in the garden of the National Museum of Natural History in Paris.
- András Beck notably produced a bronze mask of Saint-John Perse, covered with gold leaf, which served as a cover vignette for his work in the edition of the Bibliothèque de la Pléiade.
- The Saint-John Perse Museum is partly dedicated to him in Point-à-Pitre, his birthplace.
- His name was given to various streets and libraries in France.
- The 2007 promotion of heritage curators from the French National Heritage Institute bears his name.
- A Reims tramway station bears his name.
- In October 1980, the French Post dedicated a stamp to him with a face value of 1.40 + 0.30 francs, available simultaneously in Pointe-à-Pitre and Aix-en-Provence. For the centenary of the creation of the Nobel Prizes, the British Virgin Islands issued in 2001 a 40-cent stamp bearing his image.
- The Saint-John Perse high school in Pau bears his name.

== See also ==
- Le Monde's 100 Books of the Century, a list which includes Amers

== Secondary literature in English ==
1936

- S. A. Rhodes, "Poetry of Saint-John Perse", The Sewanee Review, vol. XLIV, no. 1, January – March 1936

1944

- Paul Rosenfeld, "The Poet Perse", The Nation, New York, vol. CLVIII, no. 20, 15 May 1944
- John Gould Fletcher, "On the Poetry of Alexis Saint-Leger Leger", Quarterly Review of Literature, vol. II, Autumn 1944
- Edouard Roditi, "Éloges and other poems, Saint-John Perse", Contemporary Poetry, Baltimore, vol. IV, no. 3, Autumn 1944

1945

- Conrad Aiken, "Rains, by Saint-John Perse. Whole Meaning or Doodles", New Republic, Washington, no. CXII, 16 April 1945

1948

- David Gascoigne, "Vents by Saint-John Perse", Poetry, London, June–July 1948

1949

- Valery Larbaud, préface à Anabasis, translated by Jacques Le Clerq, in Anabasis, New York, Harcourt, Brace and Co, 1949
- Hugo von Hofmannsthal, préface à Anabasis, translated by James Stern, ibid.
- Giuseppe Ungaretti, préface à Anabasis, translated by Adrienne Foulke, ibid.
- Archibald MacLeish, "The Living Spring", Saturday Review, vol. XXXII, no. 24, 16 July 1949
- Hubert Creekmore, "An Epic Poem of the Primitive Man", New York Times Book Review, 25 December 1949

1950

- Allen Tate, "Hommage to Saint-John Perse", Poetry, Chicago, LXXV, January 1950
- Harold W. Watts, "Anabase: The Endless Film", University of Toronto Quarterly, vol XIX, no. 3, April 1950
- Stephen Spender, "Tribute to Saint-John Perse", Cahiers de la Pléiade, Paris, Summer–Autumn 1950

1952

- Amos Wilder, "Nature and the immaculate world in Saint-John Perse", in Modern Poetry and the Christian tradition, New York, 1952
- Katherine Garrison Chapin, "Saint-John Perse. Notes on Some Poetic Contrasts", The Sewanee Review

1953

- Paul Claudel, "A Poem by St.-John Perse", translation by Hugh Chisholm, in Winds, New York, Pantheon Books, Bollingen Series, no. 34, 1953.
- Gaëtan Picon, "The Most Proudly Free", translation by Willard R. Trask, ibid, 1st edition in Les Cahiers de la Pléiade, no. 10, été–automne 1950.
- Albert Béguin, "A Poetry Marked by Scansion", translation by Willard R. Trask, ibid, 1st edition in Les Cahiers de la Pléiade, no. 10, été–automne 1950.
- Gabriel Bounoure, "St.-John Perse and Poetic Ambiguity", translation by Willard R. Trask, ibid, 1st edition in Les Cahiers de la Pléiade, no. 10, été–automne 1950
- Wallace Fowlie, "The Poetics of Saint-John Perse", Poetry,, Chicago, vol. LXXXII, no. 6, September 1953
- Hayden Carruth, "Winds by Saint-John Perse... Parnassus stormed", The Partisan Review, vol. XX, no. 5, September–October 1953
- Henri Peyre, "Exile by Saint-John Perse", Shenandoah, Lexington, vol. V, Winter 1953

1956

- "Tribute to Saint-John Perse", The Berkeley Review (Arthur J. Knodel, René Girard, Georges Huppert), vol. I, no. 1, Berkeley, 1956

1957

- Archibald MacLeish, "Saint-John Perse. The Living Spring", in A continuing journey. Essays and Addresses, Boston, 1957
- Wallace Fowlie, "Saint-John Perse", in A Guide to Contemporary French Literature, From Valéry to Sartre, New York, 1957
- Anonymous, "Saint-John Perse, Poet of the Far Shore", Times Literary Supplement, London, 2 March 1957
- Paul West, "The Revival of Epic", The Twentieth Century, London, July 1957

1958

- Conrad Aiken, A Reviewer's A.B.C., Collected criticism from 1916, New York, 1958
- Jacques Guicharnaud, "Vowels of the Sea: Amers", Yale French Studies, no. 21, Spring–Summer 1958
- Martin Turnell, "The Epic of Saint-John Perse", The Commonweal, LXX, 17 July 1958
- W. H. Auden, "A Song of Life's Power to Renew", New York Times Book Review, vol. LXIII, no. 30, 27 July 1958
- Melvin Maddocks, "Perse as Cosmologist", Christian Science Monitor, 4 September 1958
- John Marshall, "The Greatest Living French Poet", The Yale Review, XLVIII, September 1958
- Katherine Garrison Chapin, "Perse On the Sea With Us: Amers", The New Republic, Washington, CXXXIX, 27 October 1958

1959

- H.-J. Kaplan,"Saint-John Perse: The Recreation of the World", The Reporter, XV, 22 January 1959
- Raymond Mortimer, "Mr Eliot and Mr Perse: Two Fine Poets in tandem", Sunday Times, London, May 1959
- Philip Toynbee, "A Great Modern Poet", The Observer, London, 31 May 1959
- Charles Guenther, "Prince Among the Prophets", Poetry, Chicago, vol. XCIII, no. 5, 1959

1976

- Joseph Henry McMahon, A Bibliography of works by and about Saint-John Perse, Stanford University, 1959

1960

- Stanley Burnshaw, "Saint-John Perse", in The Poem Itself, New York, 1960
- Joseph MacMahon, "A Question of Man", Commonweal, LXXIII, 13 January 1960
- Byron Colt, "Saint-John Perse", Accent, New York, XX, 3, Summer 1960
- Joseph Barry, "Science and Poetry Merge in the Crucial Stage of Creation", New York Post, 12 December 1960

1961

- Bernard Weinberg, The Limits of Symbolism. Studies of Five Modern French Poets. Baudelaire, Rimbaud, Mallarmé, Valéry, Saint-John Perse, Manchester, 1961
- Anthony Hartley, "Saint-John Perse", Encounter, London, no. 2, February 1961
- Octavio Paz, "Saint-John Perse as Historian", The Nation, New York, 17 June 1961
- Donald Davis, "Chronique by Saint-John Perse", New Statesman, London, LXII, 26 July 1961
- John Montague, "The Poetry of Saint-John Perse", Irish Times, Dublin, 25 August 1961
- Léon-S. Roudiez, "The Epochal Poetry of Saint-John Perse", Columbia University Forum, New York, vol. IV, 1961

1962

- Anthony Curtis, "Back to the Elements", The Sunday Telegraph, London, 7 January 1962
- Amos Wilder, "St-John Perse and the Future of Man", Christianity and Crisis, New York, vol. XXI, no. 24, 22 January 1962
- Ronald Gaskell, "The Poetry of Saint-John Perse", The London Magazine, vol. I, no. 12, March 1962
- Peter Russel, "Saint-John Perse's Poetical works", Agenda, London, May–June 1962
- Cecil Hemley, "Onward and Upward", Hudson Review, XV, Summer 1962

1963

- Eugenia Maria Arsenault, Color Imagery in the Vents of Saint-John Perse, Catholic University of America, Washington, 1963

1964

- Arthur J. Knodel, "Towards an Understanding of Anabase", PMLA, June 1964
- Eugenia Vassylkivsky, The Main Themes of Saint-John Perse, Columbia University, 1964

1966

- Arthur J. Knodel, Saint-John Perse. A Study of His Poetry, Edimburg, 1966
- R. W. Baldner, "Saint-John Perse as Poet Prophet" in Proceedings of the Pacific Northwest Conference on Foreign Languages, vol. XVII, no. 22, 1966

1967

- Roger Little, Word Index of the Complete Poetry and Prose of Saint-John Perse, Durham, 1966 and 1967
- M. Owen de Jaham, An Introduction to Saint-John Perse, University of South Western Louisiana, 1967

1968

- Kathleen Raine, "Saint-John Perse, Poet of the Marvellous", Encounter, vol. IV, no. 29, October 1967; idem in Defending Ancient Springs, Oxford, 1968

1969

- Roger Little, "T. S. Eliot and Saint-John Perse", The Arlington Quarterly Review, University of Texas, vol. II, no. 2, Autumn 1969

1970

- Charles Delamori, "The Love and Aggression of Saint-John Perse's Pluies", Yale French Studies, 1970
- Richar O. Abel, The Relationship Between the Poetry of T. S. Eliot and Saint-John Perse, University of Southern California, 1970

1971

- Roger Little, Saint-John Perse. A Bibliography for Students of His Poetry, London, 1971
- Ruth N. Horry, Paul Claudel and Saint-John Perse. Parallels and Contrasts, University of North Carolina Press, Chapel Hill, 1971
- Pierre Emmanuel, Praise and Presence, with a Bibliography, Washington, 1971
- Candace Uter De Russy, Saint-John Perse's Chronique: A study of Kronos and Other Themes through Imagery, Tulane University, 1971
- Marc Goodhart, Poet and Poem in Exile, University of Colorado, 1971

1972

- René Galand, Saint-John Perse, New York, 1972
- Richard Ruland, America as Metaphor in Modern French Letters. Celine, Julien Green and Saint-John Perse, New York, 1972

1973

- Roger Little, Saint-John Perse, University of London, 1973
- Carol Nolan Rigolot, The Dialectics of Poetry: Saint-John Perse, University of Michigan, 1973

1974

- Richard-Allen Laden, Saint-John Perse's Vents: From Theme to Poetry, Yale University, 1974

1976

- Elizabeth Jackson, Worlds Apart Structural Parallels in the Poetry of Paul Valéry, Saint-John Perse, Benjamin Perret and René Char, The Hague, 1976
- Arthur J. Knodel, Saint-John Perse: Lettres, Princeton, 1979
- Edith Jonssen-Devillers, Cosmos and the Sacred in the Poetics of Octavio Paz and Saint-John Perse, San Diego, University of California, 1976
- John M. Cocking, "The Migrant Muse: Saint-John Perse", Encounter, London, XLVI, March 1976
- Elizabeth Jennings, "Saint-John Perse: the Worldly Seer", in Seven Men of Vision: an Appreciation, London, 1976
- Roger Little, "A Letter About Conrad by Saint-John Perse", Conradiana, Lubbock, Texas, VIII, no. 3, Autumn 1976
- Anonymous, "An Exile for Posterity", The Times Literary Supplement, London, no. 3860, 5 March 1976

1977

- Roger Little, "The Eye at the Center of Things", Times Literary Supplement, London, no. 3941, 7 October 1977
- Roger Little, "Saint-John Perse and Joseph Conrad: Some Notes and an Uncollected Letter", Modern language Review, Cambridge, LXII, no. 4, October 1977
- Roger Little, "The World and the Word in Saint-John Perse", in Sensibility and Creation: Essays in XXth Century French Poetry, London and New York, 1977
- John D. Price, "Man, Women and the Problem of Suffering in Saint-John Perse", Modern Language Review, Cambridge, LXII, no. 3, July 1977

1978

- Reino Virtanen, "Between Saint-John and Persius: Saint-John Perse and Paul Valéry", Symposium, Summer 1978
- Roger Little, "Saint-John Perse and Denis Devlin: A compagnonage", Irish University Review, Dublin, VIII, Autumn 1978

1979

- Roger Little, "Claudel and Saint-John Perse. The Convert and the Unconvertible", Claudel Studies, VI, 1979

1982

- Steven Winspur, "Saint-John Perse's Oiseaux: the Poem, the Painting and Beyond", L'Esprit Créateur, Columbia University, XXII, no. 4, Winter 1982

1983

- William Calin, "Saint-John Perse", in A Muse for Heroes: Nine Centuries of the Epic in France, University of Toronto Press, 1983
- Steven Winspur, "The Poetic Significance of the Thing-in-itself", Sub-stance, no. 41, 1983
- Joseph T. Krause, "The Visual Form of Saint-John Perse's Imagery", Aix-en-Provence, 1983
- Peter Fell, "A Critical Study of Saint-John Perse's Chronique" . MA dissertation, University of Manchester, 1983

1984

- Saint-John Perse: Documentary Exhibition and Works on the Poem Amers, Washington, 1984–1985

1985

- Erika Ostrovsky, Under the Sign of Ambiguity: Saint-John Perse/Alexis Leger, New York, 1985

1988

- Steven Winspur, Saint-John Perse and the Imaginary Reader, Geneva, 1988
- Peter Baker, "Perse on Poetry", The Connecticut Review, Willimantic, XI, no. 1, 1988
- Peter Baker, "Saint-John Perse, Alexis Leger, 1960", The Nobel Prize Winners: Literature, April 1988

1990

- Peter Baker, "Exile in Language", Studies in 20th century Literature, Manhattan (Kansas) and Lincoln (Nebraska), XIV, no. 2, Summer 1990
- Erika Ostrovsky, "Saint-John Perse", The Twentieth Century, New York, 1990

1991

- Luigi Fiorenzato, Anabasis/Anabase: T. S. Eliot translates Saint-John Perse, Padova, 1991–1992
- Peter Baker, "Metric, Naming and Exile: Perse, Pound, Genet", in The Scope of Words in Honor to Albert S. Cook, New York, 1991
- Peter Baker, Obdurate Brilliance: Exteriority and the Modern Long Poem, University of Florida Press, 1991

1992

- Josef Krause, "The Two Axes of Saint-John Perse's Imagery", Studi Francesi, Torino, XXXVI, no. 106, 1992
- Carol Rigolot, "Ancestors, Mentors and 'Grands Aînés': Saint-John Perse's Chronique", Literary Generations, Lexington, 1992

1994

- Richard L. Sterling, The Prose Works of Saint-John Perse. Towards an Understanding of His Poetry, New York, 1994

1996

- Richard A. York, "Saint-John Perse, the Diplomat", Claudel Studies, XXIII, 1–2, 1996

1997

- Judith Urian, The Biblical Context in Saint-John Perse's Work, Hebrew University of Jerusalem, 1997

1999

- Mary Gallagher, "Seminal Praise: The Poetry of Saint-John Perse", in An Introduction to Caribbean Francophone writing, Oxford, 1999
- Carol Rigolot, "Saint-John Perse's Oiseaux: from Audubon to Braque and Beyond", in Resonant Themes: Literature, History and the Arts in XIXth and XXth Century Europe, Chapel Hill, North Carolina, 1999
- Judith Urian, "Delicious Abyss: the Biblical Darkness in the Poetry of Saint-John Perse", Comparative literature studies, XXXVI, no. 3, 1999

2000

- Jeffrey Mehlman, Émigré New York. French Intellectuals in Wartime, Manhattan, 1940–1944, Baltimore and London, 2000
- Zeyma Kamalick, In Defense of Poetry: T. S. Eliot's Translation of Anabase by Saint-John Perse, Princeton, 2000

2001

- Emmanuelle Hériard Dubreuil, Une certaine idée de la France: Alexis Leger's Views During the Occupation of France June 1940 – August 1944, London School of Economics, 2001
- Pierre Lastenet, Saint-John Perse and the Sacred, University of London, 2001
- Marie-Noëlle Little (ed.), The Poet and the Diplomat: The Correspondence of Dag Hammarskjöld and Alexis Leger, Syracuse University Press, 2001
- Marie-Noëlle Little, "Travellers in Two Worlds: Dag Hammarskjöld and Alexis Leger", in Development Dialogue, Uppsala, 2001

2002

- Carol Rigolot, Forged Genealogies: Saint-John Perse's Conversations with Culture, The University of North Carolina Press, 2002

2003

- Mary Gallagher, "Remembering Caribbean Childhoods, Saint-John Perse's Éloges and Patrick Chamoiseau's Antan d'enfance", in The Francophone Caribbean Today: Literature, Language, Culture, The University of West Indies Press, 2003

2004

- Colette Camelin, "Hermes and Aphrodite in Saint-John Perse's Winds and Seamarks", in Hermes and Aphrodite Encounters, Birmingham, 2004
- Patrick Chamoiseau, "Excerpts Freely Adapted From Meditations for Saint-John Perse", Literature and Arts of the Americas, XXXVII, no. 1

2005

- Henriette Levillain, Saint-John Perse, Ministère des Affaires étrangères, Paris, 2005
- Joseph Acquisto, "The Lyric of Narrative: Exile, Poetry and Story in Saint-John Perse and Elisabeth Bishop", Orbis Litterarum, no. 5, 2005
- Xue Die, "Saint-John Perse's Palm Trees", American Letters and Commentary, no. 17, 2005
- Valérie Loichot, "Saint-John Perse's Imagined Shelter: J'habiterai mon nom, in Discursive Geographies, Writing Space and Place in French, Amsterdam, 2005
- Carol Rigolot, "Blood Brothers: Archibald MacLeish and Saint-John Perse", Archibald MacLeish Journal, Summer 2005
- Carol Rigolot, "Saint-John Perse", in Transatlantic relations, France and the Americas, Culture, Politics, History, Oxford and Santa Barbara, 2005

2007

- Valérie Loichot, Orphan Narratives: The Postplantation Literature of Faulkner, Glissant, Morrison and Saint-John Perse, University of Virginia Press, 2007
- Harris Feinsod, "Reconsidering the 'Spiritual Economy': Saint-John Perse, His Translators and the Limits of Internationalism", "Benjamin, Poetry and Criticism", Telos, New York, no. 38, 2007
- Peter Poiana, "The Order of Nemesis in Saint-John Perse's Vents", Neophilologus, vol. 91, no. 1, 2007
- Jeffrey Meyers, "The Literary Politics of the Nobel Prize", Antioch Review, vol. 65, no. 2, 2007

== Books ==
- Adamthwaite, Anthony (1977). France and the Coming of the Second World War. London: Frank Cass.
- Alexander, Martin S. (1992). The Republic in Danger General Maurice Gamelin and the Politics of French Defence, 1933–1940. Cambridge: Cambridge University Press. ISBN 978-0-521-52429-2.
- Bastid-Bruguière, Marguerite (2014). "France's Deluded Quest for Allies: Safeguarding Territorial Sovereignty and the Balance of Power in East Asia". In Hans van de Ven; Diana Lary; Stephen R. MacKinnon (eds.). Negotiating China's Destiny in World War II. Stanford: Stanford University Press. pp. 11–34. ISBN 978-0-8047-9311-7.
- Brownell, Will; Billings, Richard (1987). So Close to Greatness: The Biography of William C. Bullitt. New York: Macmillan. ISBN 0-02-517410-X.
- Cairns, John (1998). "Reflections on France, Britain and the Winter War Problem, 1939–1940". In Joel Blatt (ed.). The French Defeat of 1940 Reassessments. Providence, Rhode Island: Berghahn Books. pp. 269–285.
- Cameron, Elizabeth (1953). "Alexis Saint-Léger-Léger". In Gordon A. Craig & Felix Gilbert (ed.). The Diplomats 1919–1939. Princeton: Princeton University Press. pp. 378–405.
- Carswell, Richard (2019). The Fall of France in the Second World War History and Memory. Oxford: Springer Publishing. ISBN 978-3-030-03955-4.
- Carley, Michael Jabara (1999). 1939: The Alliance That Never Was and the Coming of World War II. Ivan Dee: Chicago.
- Ellison, David (2010). A Reader's Guide to Proust's 'In Search of Lost Time'. Cambridge: Cambridge University Press. ISBN 978-1-139-78909-7.
- Fowlie, Wallace (January 1961). "In Tribute to Saint-John Perse". Poetry. 98 (4): 255–259.
- Fuller, Pierre (2022). Modern Erasures Revolution, the Civilizing Mission, and the Shaping of China's Past. Cambridge: Cambridge University Press. ISBN 978-1-316-51572-3.
- Duroselle, Jean-Baptiste (2004). France and the Nazi Threat: The Collapse of French Diplomacy 1932–1939. New York: Enigma Books.
- Graebner, Norman A.; Bennett, Norman (2011). The Versailles Treaty and Its Legacy The Failure of the Wilsonian Vision. Cambridge: Cambridge University Press. ISBN 978-1-139-49948-4.
- Jackson, Julien (1990). The Popular Front in France Defending Democracy, 1934–38. Cambridge: Cambridge University Press. ISBN 978-0-521-31252-3.
- Keylor, William (1998). "France and the Illusion of American Support 1919–1940". In Joel Blatt (ed.). The French Defeat of 1940 Reassessments. Providence, Rhode Island: Berghahn Books. pp. 204–244.
- Little, Marie (2001). The Poet and the Diplomat The Correspondence of Dag Hammarskjöld and Alexis Leger. Syracuse: cUniversity Press. ISBN 978-0-8156-2925-2.
- Loichot, Valérie (2007). Orphan Narratives The Postplantation Literature of Faulkner, Glissant, Morrison, and Saint-John Perse. Richmond: University of Virginia Press. ISBN 978-0-8139-2641-4.
- Payne, Robert (1989). The Life and Death of Adolf Hitler. Dorchester: Dorset Press. ISBN 978-0-88029-402-7.
- Sullivan, Brian (1999). "More than meets the eye: the Ethiopian War and the Origins of the Second World War"". In Gordon Martel (ed.). The Origins of the Second World War Reconsidered A.J.P. Taylor and the Historians. London: Routledge. pp. 178–203.
- Taylor, Telford (1979). Munich The Price of Peace. New York: Doubleday. ISBN 978-0-385-02053-4.
- Thomas, Martin (1999). "France and the Czechoslovak Crisis". In Igor Lukes; Erik Goldstein (eds.). The Munich Crisis, 1938 Prelude to World War II. London: Frank Cass. pp. 122–159.
- Young, Robert (1998). "In the Eye of the Beholder: The Cultural Representation of France and Germany in the New York Times, 1939–1940". In Joel Blatt (ed.). The French Defeat of 1940 Reassessments. Providence, Rhode Island: Berghahn Books. pp. 245–268.
- Watt, Donald Cameron (1989). How War Came The Immediate Origins of the Second World War, 1938–1939. London: Heinemann.
