= Journal, 1887–1910 =

Published diary of Jules Renar

- Author: Jules Renard
- Language: French
- Genre: Diary
- Publisher: Éditions Bernouard
- Publication date: 1925
- Publication place: France

Journal, 1887–1910 is a published diary by the French author Jules Renard (1864–1910), covering his life from the age of 23 up until his death aged 46. It was published posthumously in 1925–27, in five volumes (four of the diary and one of correspondence).

== Reception ==
Somerset Maugham wrote of Renard's Journal: "The journal is wonderfully good reading. It is extremely amusing. It is witty and subtle and often wise...Jules Renard jotted down neat retorts and clever phrases, epigrams, things seen, the sayings of people and the look of them, descriptions of scenery, effects of sunshine and shadow, everything, in short, that could be of use to him when he sat down to write for publication."

It was ranked #74 in Le Monde's 100 Books of the Century.
