= Poil de Carotte =

Book by Jules Renard

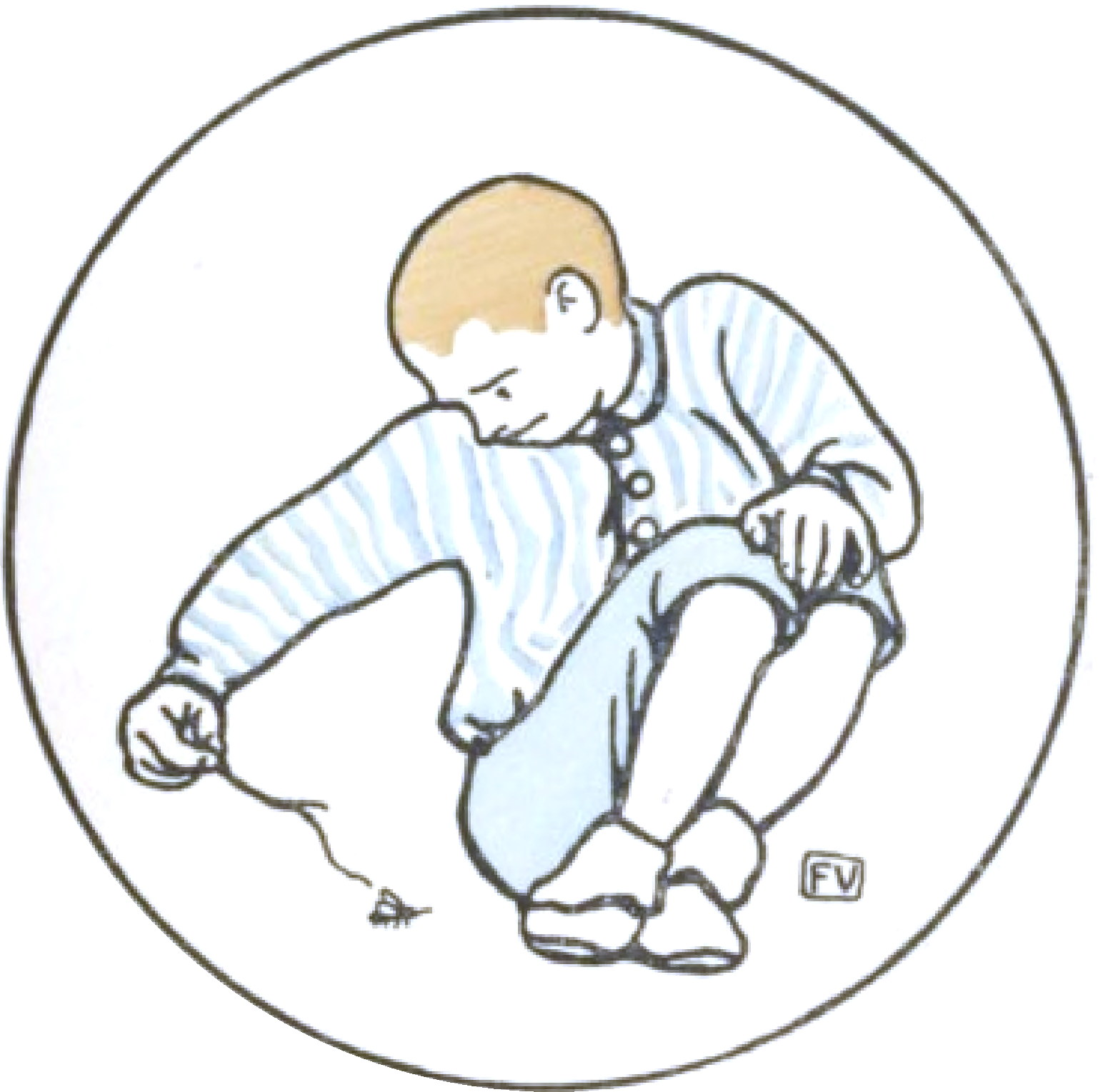
- Illustration for Poil de Carotte
- Author: Jules Renard
- Original title: Poil de Carotte
- Language: French
- Genre: autobiographical novel
- Publisher: Flammarion
- Publication date: 1894
- Publication place: France
- Pages: 185

Poil de Carotte (transl. Carrot Top) is a long short story or autobiographical novel by Jules Renard published in 1894 which recounts the childhood and the trials of a redheaded child. It is probably in this miserable childhood story where one should look for the origins of Renard's skepticism and irony, his skill in using litotes, his dense and precise styles.

== Summary ==
The story of "Poil de Carotte" is that of an unloved, redheaded child, the victim of an evil family. François Lepic, nicknamed Poil de Carotte, grows up with a mother who never likes him and a father who is indifferent to him. The reader follows the journey of this young boy and the relationships with his parents, with the world around him and with nature. Poil de Carotte uses cunning to battle the daily humiliations he experiences and to stand up to the adult world. So, tragedy notwithstanding, the reader enjoys delightful, amusing, comical, and moving adventures.

== Adaptations ==
- The author adapted the story for the stage in 1900 with André Antoine.
- In 1903, Charles Frohman produced an English-language version titled Carrots with Ethel Barrymore playing François.
- Julien Duvivier adapted it for movies twice: in 1925 as a silent film and again in 1932 with sound.
- Paul Mesnier adapted it for movies in 1952.
- Henri Graziani adapted it for movies in 1973, starring Philippe Noiret and Monique Chaumette.
- Richard Bohringer adapted it for television in 2003.
- An animated cartoon was made in 1997 and broadcast on France 5.
- A play in Walloon titled Tiesse di keuve (copper head) was written by Émile-Henri Genon, and video-recorded in 1999 by Médiathèque de la Province de Liège.
- Cheese featuring Poil de Carotte on the packaging was introduced in French supermarkets around 1974 and animated adverts were released in the early 1980s to advertise the cheese, produced under license from Homsy Delafosse & Associates.
