= Wallace Fowlie =

American writer and professor of literature

- Born: November 8, 1908; Brookline, Massachusetts
- Died: August 16, 1998; Durham, North Carolina
- Education: Harvard University (A.B., M.A., Ph.D.)
- Occupations: Scholar, translator, teacher, poet
- Writing career
- Subject: French Literature
- Notable works: Rimbaud: Complete Works, Selected Letters (trans.); Rimbaud and Jim Morrison: The Rebel as Poet
- Notable awards: John Simon Guggenheim Memorial Foundation fellowship

Wallace Fowlie (1908–1998) was an American writer and professor of literature. He was the James B. Duke Professor of French Literature at Duke University where he taught from 1964 to the end of his career. Although he published more than twenty books, he was devoted to teaching, particularly undergraduate courses in French, Italian, and modernist literature. He took his A.B. at Harvard College in 1930 followed by a Master's in 1933 and a Ph.D. in 1936, also at Harvard. Before coming to Duke in 1964, he taught at Bennington College, University of Chicago, and Yale University.

Fowlie was also noted for his correspondence with literary figures such as Henry Miller, René Char, Jean Cocteau, André Gide, Saint-John Perse, Marianne Moore, and Anaïs Nin. He is best known for his translations of Arthur Rimbaud, which were appreciated by a younger generation that included Jim Morrison (whose work Fowlie also became a scholar of) and Patti Smith. In 1990, Fowlie consulted with director Oliver Stone on the film The Doors. Probably his best-known student is another writer and critic of French literature, Roger Shattuck.

== Biography ==
Fowlie discovered French as a high school student in Brookline, Massachusetts. One of the influential events of his adolescence was a visit to Copley Plaza to attend a virtually incomprehensible lecture by Paul Claudel. Recalling the lecture in his memoir Journal of Rehearsals, Fowlie wrote "I felt that a part of my destiny would be to study his poetry and to understand it in French as one, possessor of two languages, might do." In 1928, while in his third year at Harvard, Fowlie traveled to France for the first time. He stayed with the family of Ernest Psichari in Paris, and later wrote his thesis on Psichari, a writer and religious thinker who had died in the first World War. By this time, he had also completed his first reading of Proust, which he described as " the most profound literary experience I have ever had." Over the course of his lifetime, Fowlie traveled to France many times and befriended writers such as Gide, Cocteau, St. John Perse (Leger), and Jean Genet. At Harvard he attended the classes and lectures of T.S. Eliot. One day Eliot invited a small group of students to meet a friend of his. This 'friend' turned out to be the poet W. B. Yeats. On another occasion, Fowlie saw Eliot collapse with a violent thud in the Catholic chapel. He helped him up and led him back to his seat. He immediately recognized that Eliot had had a mystical experience.

From the 1940s onward, Fowlie filled a vacuum in academia. There was room for a great teacher and explainer of significant modern French poets and writers in America and England. For several decades, Fowlie was the pre-eminent critic of French literature in America, something which earned him a John Simon Guggenheim Memorial Foundation fellowship in 1947. He published book after book on the great French writers he revered, including Mallarmé and Rimbaud. He was the first translator of Rimbaud in English: his Rimbaud, Complete Works, Selected Letters appeared in 1966. This work aligned him with his friend Henry Miller, whose work he championed, and brought Rimbaud to a new generation of fans — and with it the acknowledgment and gratitude of rock stars Patti Smith and Jim Morrison. Morrison wrote Fowlie a letter which he forgot about until his students played him the music of the Doors. He quickly recognized Rimbaud's influence in the lyrics. Then he remembered and retrieved the letter. As an octogenarian, he published Rimbaud and Jim Morrison: The Rebel As Poet.

== Works ==
- Age of Surrealism (1950)
- André Gide: His Life and Art (1965)
- Aubade: A Teacher's Notebook (1983) ISBN 0-8223-0566-6
- Characters from Proust: Poems (1983) ISBN 0-8071-1071-X
- Charles Baudelaire: Selected Poems from "Flowers of Evil" (1963) ISBN 0-486-28450-6
- Claudel (Studies in Modern European Literature and Thought) (1957)
- Climate of Violence: The French Literary Tradition from Baudelaire to the Present (1967)
- Clowns And Angels: Studies In Modern French Literature (1943)
- The Clown's Grail: A Study of Love in Its Literary Expression (1947)
- De Villon à Péguy (Editions de l'Arbre, Montreal, 1944)
- Dionysus in Paris: A Guide to Contemporary French Theater (1960)
- Ernest Psichari (Ernest Green & Co., New York, Toronto, 1939)
- From Chartered Land (William R Scott, New York, 1938)
- Jacob’s Night: The Religious Renascence in France, New York, (1947)
- Jean Cocteau: The History of a Poet's Age (1966)
- Journal of Rehearsals: A Memoir (1997) ISBN 0-8223-1945-4
- Intervalles (A. Magne, Paris, 1939, published under pen name Michel Wallace)
- La Pureté dans l'Art (Editions de l'Arbre, Montreal, 1941)
- Lautréamont (Twayne, New York, 1973) ISBN 0-8057-2511-3
- Letters of Henry Miller and Wallace Fowlie (1975)
- Mallarmé (Dennis Dobson, London; University of Chicago, Chicago, 1953)
- Matines et Vers (Paris, 1936; published under pen name Michel Wallace)
- Memory: A Fourth Memoir (1990) ISBN 0-8223-1045-7
- Poem and Symbol: A Brief History of French Symbolism (1990) ISBN 0-271-00696-X
- A Reading of Dante's Inferno (1981) ISBN 0-226-25888-2
- Rimbaud: Complete Works, Selected Letters (1966) ISBN 0-226-71973-1. (Revised, 2005, ISBN 0-226-71977-4)
- Rimbaud and Jim Morrison: The Rebel as Poet (1994) ISBN 0-8223-1442-8
- Rimbaud's Illuminations, A Study in Angelism (1953)
- Rimbaud, the Myth of Childhood (1946)
- Sites: A Third Memoir (1986) ISBN 0-8223-0700-6
- Sleep of the Pigeon (1948)
- The Spirit of France: Studies in Modern French Literature (Sheed & Ward, London, 1945)
- Stendhal (1969)

== External resources ==
- Wallace Fowlie Papers. Rubenstein Library, Duke University.
- Wallace Fowlie on Andre Gide's L'Immoraliste
- "the Ubu of 1960," blog post
