= André Géraud =

French journalist (1882–1974)

- Born: 18 October 1882
- Died: 11 December 1974 (aged 92)
- Occupations: Journalist, writer

André Géraud (18 October 1882 – 11 December 1974) was a French journalist and animal rights advocate who wrote under the pseudonym Pertinax.

== Biography ==
Géraud studied history at Bordeaux University and in 1905 joined the Landon Bureau of L'Écho de Paris. Three years later, he became its chief British correspondent. He wrote on international affairs for The Pall Mall Gazette in 1910 and The Daily Telegraph in 1912.

Géraud was an early advocate of animal rights. In 1924, he authored Déclaration des droits de l'animal which was re-published in 1939. Because the book was never translated into English, Géraud is rarely cited in English-language literature relating to animal rights, unlike Henry Stephens Salt, who is often cited. The book influenced the creation of the Universal Declaration of Animal Rights by Ligue Française des Droits de l’Animal in 1978. The book put forward the idea of an "animal code" based on three guiding principles. Animals must be happy, or, they suffer; the suffering inflicted on animals must be strictly indispensable; and the pleasures allowed to animals are justified and must not be deprived. Géraud commented that "the Declaration of Animal Rights in the twentieth century shall be the counterpart of the Declaration of Human Rights in the eighteenth century".

After the Fall of France in June 1940, Géraud sailed to the United States on a British destroyer. Time called him "France's No. 1 journalist-in-exile" who had a "reputation for perspicacity."

== Selected publications ==
- Déclaration des droits de l'animal (Bibliothèque A. Géraud, 1939)
- The Grave Diggers of France: Gamelin, Daladier, Reynaud, Pétain, and Laval. Military Defeat, Armistice, Counterrevolution (New York City: Doubleday, Doran & Company, 1944).
