= Charles Corbin =

French diplomat (1881–1970)kk

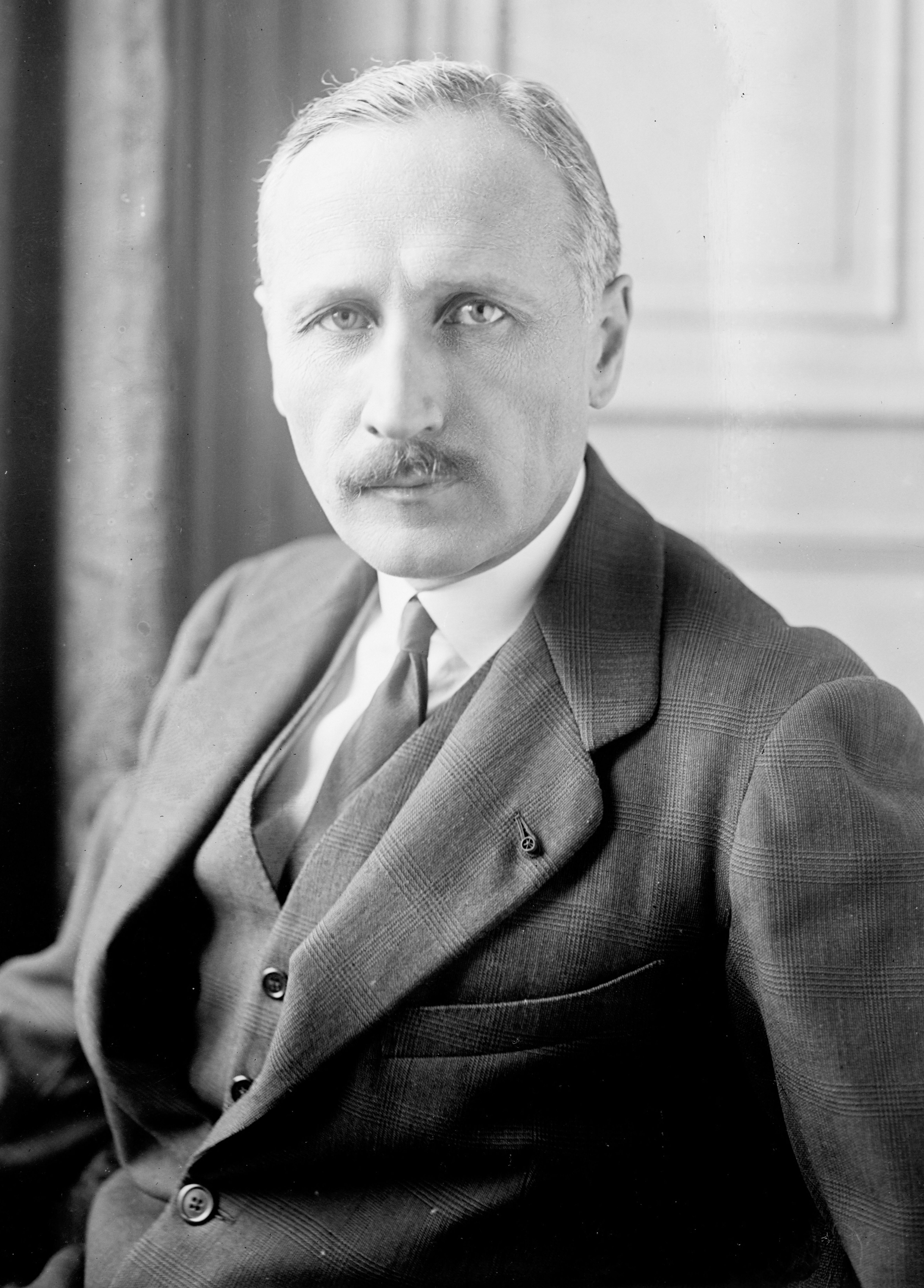
- Corbin in 1929

French Ambassador to the United Kingdom
- In office 1933 – 1940
- Preceded by: Aimé-Joseph de Fleuriau
- Succeeded by: World War II

French Ambassador to Belgium
- In office 1931 – 1933

French Ambassador to Spain
- In office 1929 – 1931

Personal details
- Born: André Charles Corbin; 4 December 1881 Paris, France
- Died: 25 September 1970 (aged 88) Neuilly-sur-Seine, France
- Education: Collège Stanislas de Paris
- Alma mater: Sorbonne

André Charles Corbin (4 December 1881 – 25 September 1970) was a French diplomat who served as French ambassador to the United Kingdom before and during the early part of the Second World War from 1933 to 27 June 1940.

== Early life ==
He was born in Paris on 4 December 1881. He was the son of Paul Corbin, an industrialist. He studied at the Collège Stanislas de Paris, a private Catholic school in which the father of Charles de Gaulle taught. He continued his education at the Faculté des Lettres at the Sorbonne.

== Diplomatic career ==
=== Early roles ===
Corbin began his diplomatic career as an attaché in 1906. He was a protégé of Alexis St. Léger, the Secretary-General (the number one official) of the Quai d'Orsay from 1932 to 1940. Corbin was part of an elite group of diplomats whose careers were sponsored by St. Léger that also included René Massigli, Robert Coulondre, Émile Naggiar and François Charles-Roux. From 1906 to 1912, he was stationed in Rome, Italy. In 1920, he was appointed head of the press bureau of the French Foreign Ministry at the Quai d'Orsay, in Paris. He made many British friends; he spoke English fluently and had a profound sympathy for Britain and British ways. In 1923, he was stationed in Madrid, Spain as a counsellor. From 1924 to 1929, he held various senior roles within the French Foreign Ministry.

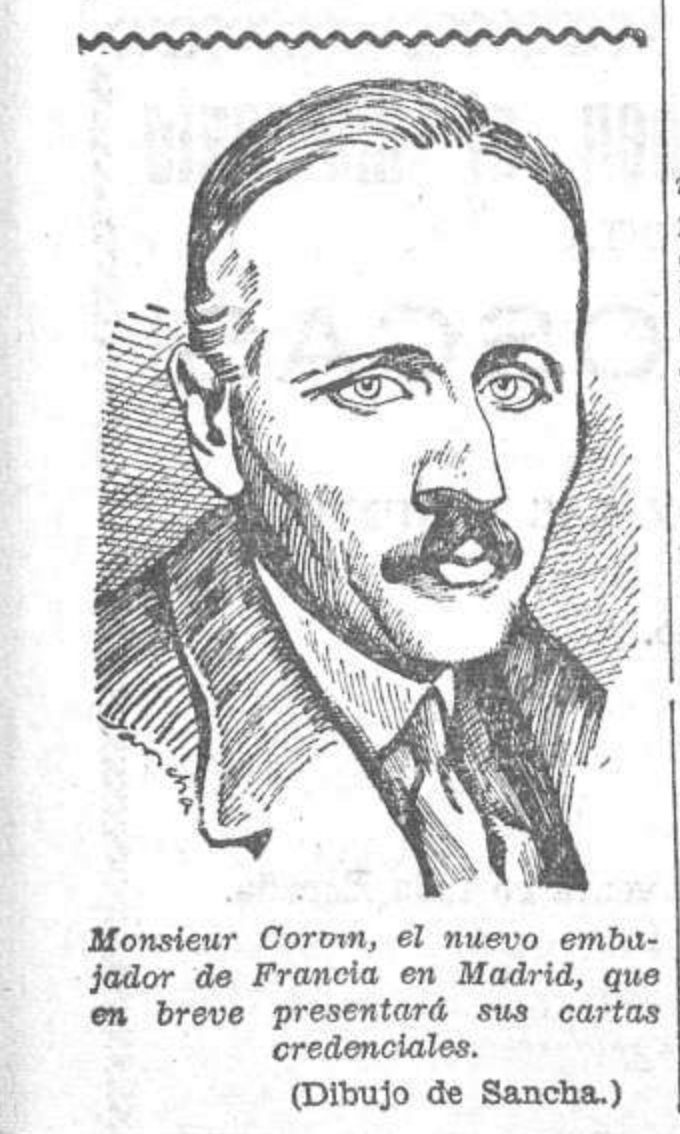
An illustration of Corbin in 1929, during his posting as French ambassador to Spain

Corbin served as the French ambassador to Spain from 1929 to 1931. On 17 April 1931, he communicated France's recognition of the newly pronounced Second Spanish Republic to the Provisional Government, helping legitimise the new regime and prompting a wave of recognition by other countries.

Corbin served as French ambassador to Belgium from 1931 to 1933. David Owen Kieft described him as "a good example of French condescension towards Belgium", noting that "whenever the Belgians asked questions about their obligations to France [under the Franco-Belgian Accord of 1920], Corbin wrote them off as a response to Flemish agitation and failed to recognize that they reflected also the genuine misgivings of professional diplomats and soldiers". (Support for the Franco-Belgian Accord was stronger amongst the Walloon population of Belgium, who favoured closer military ties with France, whereas the Flemish population was opposed to what they perceived as rising French influence in the country.) Belgium ultimately withdrew from the Accord and adopted a policy of neutrality in October 1936.

=== Ambassador in London ===
==== Chasing the "continental commitment" ====
Corbin was assigned to London as ambassador in 1933. He arrived in London on 13 March 1933 and presented his credentials as the ambassador of the republic to King George V at Buckingham Palace the same day. Corbin was a very close friend of St. Léger and shared his anti-appeasement views. Corbin's knowledge of economic affairs enabled him to arrange and preside skillfully over meetings of French and British civil servants between 1934 and 1939, while the two nations were preparing for war with Germany. The main purpose of Corbin's ambassadorship was to secure the "continental commitment", which was the phrase used to describe having a British commitment to defend France from Germany by sending another expeditionary force on the same scale as in the First World War. In turn, the French desire for the "continental commitment" was due to Germany's greater population, which led to the French to look towards the British empire as a way to even the odds. In the event of war, Germany could mobilise 17 million young men for war while the France could only mobilise 6 million young men. It was generally accepted by the French that France needed the "continental commitment" to have a chance of defeating the Reich. The "continental commitment" was the opposite of the "limited liability" defense policy that formed the basis of British rearmament until 1939. Under the "limited liability" doctrine, the majority of the defence budget went to the Royal Air Force and the Royal Navy while the British Army was to be kept so small as to rule out the "continental commitment" ever being made again. Under the "limited liability" doctrine, the British Army was to be an all-volunteer force intended to serve as a glorified colonial police force that would be strong enough to put down any uprisings in the colonies, but not to fight a major war with a nation like Germany.

The first major crisis in Anglo-French relations occurred in June 1934, when French Foreign Minister Louis Barthou attempted to create an "Eastern Locarno", a counterpart to the Locarno Treaties of 1925-26 guaranteeing the borders of Western Europe for Eastern Europe with the intent of deter Adolf Hitler from aggression in Eastern Europe. The real purpose of the "Eastern Locarno" was to bring the Soviet Union into a front meant to deter Germany; Barthou frankly told Soviet Foreign Commissar Maxim Litvinov at a meeting in Geneva on 18 May 1934 that if Germany refused to join the "Eastern Locarno" as expected, France would sign a military alliance with the Soviet Union. Barthou's plans to enlist the Soviet Union as an ally against Germany was extremely unpopular in Britain with Corbin reporting that most British newspapers portrayed the Soviets as a menace and Barthou as reckless and irresponsible for wanting to bring the Soviet Union into an anti-German front. On 14 June 1934, Corbin met the Foreign Secretary, Sir John Simon, who was openly hostile to the French plan for an "Eastern Locarno" and the Permanent Undersecretary, Sir Robert "Van" Vansittart, who was mostly silent during the meeting.

A major dilemma for French decisionmakers in the 1930s was that it was felt in Paris that France could not defeat Germany in another war without Britain, but at the same time, Britain until 1939 was opposed to security commitments in Eastern Europe, where France had a number of allies. The issue of the "Eastern Locarno" was considered so important that on 9–10 July 1934 a French delegation consisting of Barthou, Corbin, the Secretary-General of the Quai d'Orsay Alexis St. Léger, the Political Director René Massigli, and Roland de Margerie met in London with Simon, Vansittart, Sir Anthony Eden, Orme Sargent and Lord Stanhope. The meeting went badly with Simon stating his belief that Hitler was a man of peace and wanted only to revise the "unjust" Treaty of Versailles, and once that was achieved, would live in harmony with all his neighbors. Simon ridiculed French fears of the Third Reich, and when Barthou said an "Eastern Locarno" was necessary to protect France and its allies in Eastern Europe, Simon incredulously replied, "To protect yourselves from Germany?" Barthou, known as one of the more tougher French politicians, refused to yield to Simon's objections while St. Léger and Corbin were more conciliatory. St. Léger spoke of the "fundamental importance that France attached to her friendship with England. She does not want to do anything against Great Britain. Better still, the French government does not wish to get into anything without Great Britain".

When the French Foreign Minister Pierre Laval and the Premier Pierre-Étienne Flandin visited London in February 1935 to discuss the issue of the increasing open German violations of the disarmament clauses of the Treaty of Versailles, the duo left Paris with no agenda beyond producing an agreement that would not cause the Flandin government to lose a vote of no-confidence in the Assemblée nationale. Concerned that Laval and Flandin were taking too short term of a view, Corbin rushed out to meet them when they landed in Dover and told them that the British public were terrified of the potential of strategic bombing to destroy entire cities. Corbin argued that given the fear of strategic bombing in Britain that a French offer to impose limitations on air forces might compel the British government to agree, which would thus lead to a common Anglo-French front against Germany, which was barely trying to hide the existence of the Luftwaffe (the Treaty of Versailles had forbidden Germany to have an air force). Laval and Flandin took up Corbin's suggestion for an "air pact" to ban strategic bombing, only to find that the British Prime Minister Ramsay MacDonald was a man whose mental capacity had seriously declined as he proved incapable of focusing his thoughts on any issue for a sustained period of time. MacDonald approved of the idea of an "air pact", but by this time was no longer mentally capable of deciding just what he precisely he wanted. On 17 March 1935, Hitler finally dropped the pretense and admitted in public the existence of the Luftwaffe as he stated that his government no longer intended to abide by the Treaty of Versailles. Simon sent off a formal protest to Berlin against this violation of the Treaty of Versailles without consulting the French. Simon gave two different explanations for his actions, telling Laval in a letter that he needed to consult Parliament while telling Corbin that he thought he would look weak as Foreign Secretary if he were seen consulting with allies.

==== Making friends in London ====
A man of great charm, distinguished appearance and elegant manners who was fluent in English, Corbin was a favorite of the British Establishment and a dinner invitation with him was a great and much sought after honor. Corbin was such an Anglophile that within the Quai d'Orsay he was known as "the English ambassador to the Court of St. James". Corbin in his dispatches to Paris made clear his personal preference for anti-appeasement Conservative MPs by often favorably mentioning Winston Churchill, Leo Amery, Alfred Duff Cooper, General Edward Spears, and Sir Anthony Eden together with the Francophile National Labour MP Harold Nicolson. Corbin noted in his dispatches to Paris a connection between Francophilia and an anti-appeasement stance by commenting that those MPs most inclined to be Francophiles like Churchill, Duff Cooper, Spears, Amery and Nicolson were the ones most likely to be opposed to appeasement. Through Nicolson and his wife, the novelist Lady Vita Sackville-West, Corbin was well connected to the British aristocracy, but Corbin found the bohemian Sackville-West not to match his idea about what a British aristocrat should be like. The French historian Jean-Baptiste Duroselle wrote that Corbin's dispatches from London were not of the same literary quality as those of André François-Poncet, the French ambassador in Berlin from 1931 to 1938, whose dispatches are regarded as classics of French writing as he produced a memorably laced-in-acid picture of German society, but Corbin's dispatches were still models of elegant, precise French favored by the Quai d'Orsay, and there was much to be learned about British politics and high society from 1933 to 1940 from reading Corbin's dispatches. Duroselle described Corbin as a man with a very legalistic mind, who favored precise language and was a stickler for details.

The British official that Corbin was most close to was Sir Robert "Van" Vansittart, the francophile Permanent Undersecretary at the Foreign Office between 1930 and 1937, whom Corbin called a true friend of France. Vansittart sometimes leaked material to Corbin in attempts to sabotage his government's policies. Corbin during his time in London was usually frustrated by the widespread attitude in Britain that the Treaty of Versailles was a French-designed "Carthaginian peace" that was far too harsh on Germany and that it was the French who were the principle trouble-makers in Europe by seeking to uphold the treaty. He founded his Anglophilia severely tested by the anti-Versailles and anti-French views held by much of the British people and Establishment.

In his private conversations with Vansittart, Corbin often vented his frustration with the tendency of so many in Britain to see Germany as the wronged nation, the "victim of Versailles" that Britain should help. In the same way, Corbin with his love of precision was exasperated by the usually vague assurances of British politicians and officials, who told him that Britain wanted to be a friend of France, was opposed to any nation dominating Europe and wanted to avoid another war and that aspects of the international system created by the Treaty of Versailles needed to be revised in the favor of Germany. For his part, Corbin in his usual polite and gentlemanly way made clear his disagreement with the direction of British foreign policy and that he supported an Anglo-French alliance to uphold the system created by the Treaty of Versailles against efforts of Germany to challenge the system. When the Spanish Civil War began, the Socialist French premier Léon Blum allowed French military aid to the Spanish Republic. Corbin advised Blum against aid for the Spanish Republic, arguing that Britain was solidly against aid to Spain and France could not afford a rift with Britain.

==== On the Non-Intervention Committee ====
During the Spanish Civil War, Corbin served as the French representative on the ineffectual Non-intervention Committee designed to end foreign intervention in Spain. The Non-Intervention Committee consisted of Lord Plymouth who served as the chairman plus the ambassadors in London of France, Germany, Italy, the Soviet Union, Belgium, Czechoslovakia, Sweden and Portugal. Following the destruction of the Basque town of Guernica on 26 April 1937, which was destroyed by a Luftwaffe bombing raid, Corbin was ordered by the French Foreign Minister Yvon Delbos with having the Non-Intervention Committee adopt a list of "open towns" in Spain that would not be bombed in the future. Corbin reported to Delbos that the Whitehall was in favor of the French initiative because the British "public was outraged by the bombing of Guernica". When Corbin raised the subject at a meeting of the Non-Intervention Committee on 4 May 1937, Joachim von Ribbentrop, the German ambassador in London, objected strenuously, claiming that he had not enough time to study the question and demanded the matter be adjured until he and the rest of German Embassy staff in London had more time, a request that Lord Plymouth granted. At the next meeting of the Non-Intervention Committee on 7 May, Corbin submitted a list of "open towns" and politely accused aircraft flying for the Spanish Nationalists of bombing Guernica to avoid angering Ribbentrop. Corbin's motion was supported by Lord Plymouth along with the Soviet ambassador Ivan Maisky, the Swedish minister Baron Erik Palmstierna, the Belgian ambassador Baron Emile de Cartier de Marchienne, and the Czechoslovak diplomat Vilém Cernŷ minister who was standing for the minister Jan Masaryk.

Ribbentrop had arranged with the Portuguese ambassador A.R. de Monteiro to have the latter declare: "I think the Portuguese government will give its support to all measures which could be undertaken to end the horrors of the Spanish civil war". At that point, Ribbentrop rose on cue to object that the Non-Intervention Committee had exceeded its brief which was only to end foreign intervention in Spain and not end the civil war itself. Corbin challenged Ribbentrop as he told him in French: "I do not think this case could be considered as interference in Spanish internal affairs". Ribbentrop supported by Guido Crolla (who was standing in for the Italian ambassador Dino Grandi) continued to argue that the "open towns" policy was a violation of the Non-Intervention Committee's policy and the matter had to be dropped. Francis Hemming, the Foreign Office clerk who served as the secretary to the Non-Intervention Committee, drafted a statement that Corbin objected to as he stated: "The general impression given is that the British initiative has been met only with doubts, which is not the case". Maisky proposed a new draft that would say that all of the members of the Non-Intervention Committee except for Ribbentrop and Crolla were in favor of the "open towns" policy. Ribbentrop then objected that Maisky was waging "propaganda" and demanded that the statement be made as "general as possible". As was often the case with the meetings of the Non-Intervention Committee, a lengthy argument ensured between Maisky and Ribbentrop with Maisky speaking for the "open towns" policy while Ribbentrop now demanded that any statement issued deal with atrocities on both sides because to do so otherwise would be "propaganda".

Both Crolla and Monteiro came out in support of Ribbentrop's motion. Corbin in response stated: "it would be highly regrettable that in a situation...where we see development of war bring to the non-combatant population sufferings unacceptable to the civilised world, a scruple of this kind could stop us and prevent the Committee from showing its opinion". Corbin pointed out that the issue was the bombing of Spanish cities and towns, and that the "open towns" policy would apply to both sides. Marchienne sided with the demands of Ribbentrop, Crolla and Monteiro for a vague statement calling on both sides to avoid needless suffering, which led Palmstierna to shout that this was "too platonic!" with both Maisky and Cernŷ saying that this watered-down text was not worth even releasing. Palmstierna argued that the killing of women and children via bombing needed to be condemned, which left Ribbentrop to accuse the Spanish Communists of committing far worse atrocities. Maisky with much sarcasm congratulated Ribbentrop for his "striking propaganda speech". In the end, no statement was released.

==== From Sudetenland Crisis to Munich Agreement ====
In December 1937, when Vansittart was "kicked upstairs" to the meaningless post of Chief Diplomatic Adviser, whose advice was always ignored, to be replaced with Sir Alexander Cadogan, Corbin was disappointed. In contrast to his friendship with Vansittart, Corbin was usually negative in his dispatches to Paris towards the "big four" of British politics in the 1930s, Sir John Simon, Lord Halifax, Sir Samuel Hoare and Neville Chamberlain, all of whom he clearly disliked. Through Corbin was always outwardly polite and courteous towards Chamberlain, Hoare, Halifax and Simon, his dispatches to Paris made plain his real feelings. Chamberlain as the most committed supporter within the Cabinet of the "limited liability" doctrine was Corbin's bete noir.

In a speech about defence policy, Chamberlain stated: "We shall never again send to the Continent an army on the scale of that which we put into the field of the Great War" The War Minister, Leslie Hore-Belisha, agreed, telling the House of Commons: "Our Army should be organised to defend this country and the empire...to organise it with a military prepossession in favor of a continental commitment is wrong". On 21 March 1938, Foreign Minister Joseph Paul-Boncour instructed Corbin to seek to "interest" the British in Eastern Europe, especially in the states of the cordon sanitaire: Czechoslovakia, Poland, Romania and Yugoslavia. On 23 March 1938, Paul-Boncour stated in his instructions for Corbin that the French had intelligence that German rearmament had not reached a point that the Reich could fight a long war, and if France mobilised with full British support, that would force the Wehrmacht to concentrate its strength along the West Wall and make any German aggression in Eastern Europe impossible. Paul-Boncour concluded that France did not want a war with Germany, but a strategy of deterrence, instead of appeasement, would be the best way to achieve peace.

On 7 April 1938, Corbin reported to Paris that he received intelligence from an unnamed friend in the British government that was evidently leaked that sources within the Italian government had informed the British embassy in Rome that Hitler was pressuring Mussolini to undertake an aggressively-anti-French foreign policy to distract France from its allies in the cordon sanitaire. Corbin reported that when Hitler visited Rome in May 1938, it was expected that he would make an arrangement with Mussolini that Germany would support Italian ambitions in the Mediterranean in exchange for Italian support for German ambitions in Eastern Europe. However, Paul-Boncour's strategy of deterrence diplomacy was abandoned with the fall of the government in Léon Blum in Paris on 10 April 1938 as the new premier, Edouard Daladier, appointed as his foreign minister, Georges Bonnet, who was opposed to the idea of France going to war for the sake of its allies in the cordon sanitarire. Corbin reported to Paris in April 1938 that the British public was "alarmed" by the possibility of peacetime conscription, which was the prerequisite of the "continental commitment". During Daladier's visit to London in April 1938, Lord Halifax told him that a France could expect only two British Army divisions to assist with the defense of France, a force that the French regarded as completely inadequate. The Wehrmacht numbered 17 million men, and an expeditionary force oftwo divisions would have been far too small to make a difference.

On 11 July 1938, Corbin met with Herbert von Dirksen, the German ambassador to the Court of St. James. Corbin reported to Paris that Dirksen had told him "The British people...increasingly tend to envisage the destruction of an air war as the inevitable result of German aggression against Great Britain", which Dirksen saw as a positive development. Dirksen told Corbin that there as long as the British people believed that the Luftwaffe would destroy their cities, there was less chance of British "aggression" against Germany. Dirksen further advised Corbin that for that same reason, France should not count on Britain if it decided to honour the 1924 French-Czechoslovak Alliance, which committed France to go to war with any nation that attacked Czechoslovakia. However, Corbin also reported that Dirksen had complained to him that "public opinion is currently against Germany". On 3 September 1938, Corbin complained to Maisky-with whom he was friendly with-that the Chamberlain's government's confusing messages about what it would do if Germany invaded Czechoslovakia was making it more likely that an invasion would occur. Corbin told Maisky that Daladier did not want a war, but that France would honor its alliance with Czechoslovakia if the Reich should invade. Corbin often complained that Bonnet was secretive and dishonest. In an unguarded moment after learning from Maisky of a meeting between the Soviet Foreign Commissar Maxim Litvinov and the diplomat Jean Payart that Bonnet had not informed him of, Corbin stated "I was astonished to learn".

When Chamberlain returned to London from Munich on 30 September 1938 after he had signed the Munich Agreement and the Anglo-German Declaration, Corbin was not there to greet him at Heston Airport despite being invited. The snub was noticed by both the British and the French press at the time. Other ambassadors in London such as the American ambassador Joseph P. Kennedy Sr., the South African high commissioner Charles Theodore Te Water and the Canadian high commissioner Vincent Massey were all present at Heston Airport to congratulate Chamberlain for the Munich Agreement. In October 1938, Bonnet demoted René Massigli, the anti-appeasement Political Director of the Quai d'Orsay, by making him ambassador to Turkey while Pierre Comert of the Press Department was sent to the French embassy in Washington. Bonnet would have also liked to demote Corbin, whom he knew to be opposed to his policies, but he lacked an obvious replacement. The British historian D.C Watt called Corbin "a determined opponent of any weakness towards Germany on either side of the Channel".

==== War scares: winter of 1938-1939 ====
Corbin reported the British public opinion had supported the Munich Agreement, but he noted as October 1938 went on, public opinion was "in disarray". In the fall of 1938, Corbin reported to Paris that several right-wing newspapers, most notably the newspaper chain owned by the Canadian media magnate Lord Beaverbrook, whose flagship paper was The Daily Express, were calling for a peacetime conscription, which he took as a sign that the British public was turning against appeasement. Corbin was following his own agenda in his dispatches, as he wanted to convince Daladier and other decision-makers in Paris that the British public and government were starting to favour "firmness" towards the Reich as a way to undercut Bonnet's foreign policy of giving Germany a "free hand in the East" in exchange for leaving France alone. Corbin reported that there was a growing demand in Britain for "if not conscription pure and simple, at least a form of 'national service'". In November 1938, Corbin reported that one public opinion poll showed that most British people favoured a "national registry" of young men. At the same time, Corbin told Foreign Secretary Lord Halifax that there was growing defeatism in France and that Bonnet had his own agenda of reaching an understanding with the Reich that might very well be at Britain's expense.

To counter Bonnet, Corbin urged Halifax that Britain should make an effort to stand by France such as making the "continental commitment" and said that as long the French believed the British "would fight to the last Frenchman", the appeal of Bonnet would continue to grow. On 1 November 1938, Lord Halifax in a dispatch to Sir Eric Phipps, the British ambassador in Paris, stated his fear that France would "turn so defeatist as to give up the struggle of maintaining adequate forces even for the safety of metropolitan France". Corbin also wrote to urge his government to confront Chamberlain on the conscription issue: "Must we wait six months as in 1914 for the 'first hundred thousand' to make their appearance on our soil?" Corbin was assisted in a ways that were not entirely proper by General Sir Henry Pownall, the Director of Military Operations and Intelligence in the British Army, who leaked information to him to assist him with pressuring Chamberlain to make the "continental commitment". Corbin's friendship with several anti-appeasement Conservative MPs such as Churchill, Eden, Duff Cooper and Amery encouraged his tendency to argue for a foreign policy that would be more in tune with the anti-appeasers than with the appeasers.

In January 1939, the Chamberlain cabinet was rocked by the "Dutch war scare" when false information, possibly planted by the French, alleged that Germany was about to invade the Netherlands with the aim of using Dutch airfields to bomb Britain. (Note: DC Watt suggested in "How War Came" (1989) that the Dutch War Scare was planted by anti-Nazi leaders in German intelligence, such as Admiral Canaris or Hans Oster.) Chamberlain's "limited liability" doctrine of keeping the British Army so weak as to rule out the "continental commitment" came back to haunt him during the war scare. As the British Army could not defend the Netherlands on its own, the only nation with an army strong enough to save the Netherlands was France. During the war scare, Corbin pressed William Strang to have his government make the "continental commitment" by saying that it would be impossible for France to go to war to defend Britain if Britain was unwilling to do anything to defend France. On 1 February 1939, Corbin handed Strang a note saying that if Britain was not willing to do defend France, France would not be willing to defend Britain. On 6 February 1939, Chamberlain told the House of Commons that Britain was "guaranteeing" France and said that any attack on France by Germany or Italy would result in an automatic British declaration of war on the aggressor. Chamberlain's statement gratified Corbin, but he continued to press very strongly for peacetime conscription in Britain by saying that the "guarantee" was worthless without conscription.

At the same time, Corbin remained very critical of the Labour Party, which had philosophical reasons for opposing peacetime conscription as a major obstacle as Labour leaders vowed to campaign against conscription if introduced at the next general election. Corbin was forced to explain in a dispatch to Paris that in France conscription to defend the motherland was something almost all Frenchmen supported, but "the psychological atmosphere is not the same in Britain...to the French Trade Unionist, as to all compatriots the idea that conscription should be undemocratic is impossible to grasp". Corbin explained to Paris that to British trade unions, the Labour Party and the British left in general, peacetime conscription was a major violation of basic human rights, and even if the Chamberlain government was willing to bring in conscription, there would be significant domestic opposition. However, Corbin noted that several rising young Labour politicians such as Hugh Gaitskell and Douglas Jay were speaking in favour of peacetime conscription by arguing the Labour Party was making a mockery of its opposition to fascism by also opposing conscription. Corbin reported the violent anti-British media campaign launched in Germany in November 1938 was starting to have some effect and that more and more British people were speaking in favour of conscription as the winter of 1938-1939 went on.

==== Danzig Crisis: last days of peace, 1939 ====
In March 1939, in response to the Tilea Affair, Chamberlain proposed a four-power declaration by Britain, France, Poland and the Soviet Union that they would defend Romania from a German attack. Corbin, with his usual love of precise language, was described as being horrified by the vague language of Chamberlain's proposed draft, and it was after much consultation with him that the draft for the statement to protect Romania was made much clearer and more precise. Ivan Maisky, the Soviet ambassador in London, talked with Corbin on 29 March 1939 during which Corbin predicated that very soon Britain would make "guarantees" of Poland and Romania and that the United Kingdom seemed "more willing than at any time in the past to accept obligations" in Eastern Europe".

Given the traditional British opposition to any sort of security commitments in Eastern Europe, Corbin was astonished by the speech given by Prime Minister Chamberlain before the House of Commons on 31 March 1939 announcing the "guarantee" of Poland. Corbin reported to Bonnet on 4 April 1939: "Had I been told three weeks ago that during this time period the British government would have guaranteed the independence of Poland... that such a decision would have been cheered by a nearly unanimous Parliament and that no opposition to it would appear in the press or the public, I would have no doubt greeted such a forecast with an incredulous smile.... The new orientation given to British foreign representing such a complete break with the traditional position is so important that it may be said without exaggeration as being of historical magnitude.... The objective was to oppose the establishment of German hegemony over continental Europe.... The dissenting Conservatives that Messrs Eden, Churchill and Duff Cooper usually represented immediately rallied in support of the government. On 26 April 1939, Chamberlain announced to the House of Commons that for the first time in British history, peacetime conscription would be introduced and that a British expeditionary force would be sent to defend France in the event of a war with Germany, thus achieving one of the central goals of French diplomacy, namely the "continental commitment". Corbin reported the introduction of peacetime conscription "will have immense reverberations across the world, particularly in France where it has been waited for with such anxiety". Corbin was too modest to note that the pressure he had applied in the winter of 1938-1939 via leaks to the British newspapers had played a major role in that decision.

During the talks for the "peace front" of the Soviet Union, France, and the United Kingdom that was meant to deter Germany from invading Poland, a major issue was that the Soviet demand that the Poles grant transit rights for the Red Army in the event of a German invasion, which the Polish Foreign Minister Colonel Józef Beck refused to grant under the grounds that the Red Army would not leave Poland once it had entered. Corbin told Lord Halifax that he "...thought the strongest pressure must be brought to bear on Poland, even to the extent of threats, to secure her collaboration". On 17 April 1939, Litvinov proposed an alliance with Britain and France, and Corbin reported that Litvinov's offer was "rejected with disdain" in London. Corbin then reported that Sir Alexander Cadogan, the permanent undersecretary at the Foreign Office, thought the better of his rejection and decided to tentatively embrace the talks with the Soviet Union.

In April 1939, Corbin spoke to Lord Halifax about his concerns about Japan. Corbin admitted his fears as he noted that the Japanese were extremely unhappy that the colony of French Indochina was one of the main routes for shipping arms to China and France was coming under heavy Japanese pressure to cease arms shipments to China. Daladier and the minister of colonies, Georges Mandel, believed supporting China was the best way of preventing the Japanese from moving into Southeast Asia and continued to allow the arms shipments to China despite the threatening tone from Tokyo. Corbin also admitted that the majority of the warships of the Marine nationale were concentrated in the Mediterranean to deal with any potential threat from Italy. Corbin asked that given it was also in Britain's interest that the Japanese Navy not dominate the South China Sea about a joint Anglo-French operation to "neutratlise" the Japanese from occupying Hainan island, an offer that the British rejected. Given the Danzig crisis, Corbin came to feel that activating the Singapore strategy of sending a strong Royal Navy force to Singapore (the main British naval base in Asia) was inadvisable, which led him to repeatedly urge that the United States be brought in to form a common Anglo-French-American front to block Japanese expansionism into Southeast Asia. Corbin noted that the American colony of the Philippines were on the eastern side of the South China Sea and that the Americans were learning in a pro-Chinese neutrality. However, Chamberlain had little faith in American promises.

On 4 May 1939, Litvinov was sacked as Foreign Commissar and replaced with Vyacheslav Molotov, who was well known as a "hard man" with his nickname being "Mr. Nyet". On 15 May 1939, Corbin was ordered by Bonnet to press most strongly in London the need for an alliance with the Soviet Union and to advise the British to respond more swiftly to Soviet offers within hours instead of taking weeks to reply. Bonnet wrote that the replacement of Litvinov with Molotov indicated an important change in Soviet foreign policy. However, in the same report Bonnet wrote "the French government would be perfectly well satisfied with the British formula [for an agreement with the Soviet Union under which an Anglo-Soviet alliance would concluded only after a German invasion of Poland] if the Soviet government cold be persuaded to accept it". Corbin who knew Maisky doubted that the Soviets would accept the "British formula" as Bonnet had hoped. Corbin reported that Cadogan had told him that he did not think very much of the French plan for an Anglo-French-Soviet alliance.

Corbin reported to Paris that much of the British "reticence" towards an alliance with the Soviet Union was due to Chamberlain's anti-Soviet feelings. On 18 May 1939, Maisky told Corbin that the British offer to open staff talks with Moscow and to only conclude alliance if Germany invaded Poland was intolerable. Maisky stated that his government wanted a full military alliance with Britain and France immediately. When William Strang was sent to Moscow to negotiate with Vyacheslav Molotov for the alliance, Corbin met with Lord Halifax on 7 June 1939 to ask for the details of the Strang mission. After reading the orders given to Strang, Corbin told Cadogan that Strang's mission was unlikely to succeed as he "fully appreciated all the difficulties [of negotiating with the Soviets]...but the fact remained that if the Russians were confronted with a document such as we had prepared they would be filled with the darkest suspicion". On 17 June 1939, Corbin told Cadogan that the French were unhappy about the slow pace of the talks with Moscow as he argued that time was of the essence, and the sooner the projected Anglo-French-Soviet alliance was concluded the better. On 5 July 1939, Sir Orme Sargent told Corbin that felt that the "guarantees" of Poland and Romania had been a mistake as Britain would have to declare war on Germany if either of those states were invaded, which provided a degree of security for the Soviet Union, which he felt was the reason for Molotov's obdurate negotiating style.

In the summer of 1939, Corbin poured so much scorn on a proposal to have Pope Pius XII mediate an end to the Danzig crisis by pointing out the impracticalities posed by having the well-known Germanophile pontiff serving as a supposedly neutral mediator that Bonnet was forced to give up the idea. During the debates within the French cabinet between Daladier and Bonnet in August 1939 about going to war with Poland, Corbin strengthened Daladier's hand by reporting that Britain approved of his foreign policy, much to the intense fury of Bonnet, who wanted Corbin to report the opposite. On 2 August 1939, Bonnet told Sir Eric Phipps, the British ambassador in Paris who shared his support of appeasement, that his main enemies inside the Quai d'Orsay were St. Léger along with Corbin. On 27 August 1939, Corbin at present at a meeting between Sir Alexander Cadogan and the Swedish businessman Birger Dahlerus, who been playing amateur diplomat by negotiating an end to the Danzig Crisis. Corbin had been worried that Britain was using Daherus to negotiate behind France's back and so Cadogan invited him to hear him lecture Dahlerus that Germany's "gangster policy would have to cease". On the night of 30 August, German Foreign Minister Joachim von Ribbentrop gave Sir Nevile Henderson, the British ambassador in Berlin, the German "final offer" demanding for a Polish envoy to arrive in Berlin that night to discuss the resolution of the Danzig Crisis. Chamberlain called Corbin that night to say he thought Hitler was bluffing and the peace could still be saved.

As Italy was not ready for war in 1939, despite the offensive alliance known as the Pact of Steel, the Italian Foreign Minister Count Galeazzo Ciano proposed an international conference for 5 September 1939, to be chaired by Mussolini, to discuss the crisis. Lord Halifax asked Corbin for the French reaction to the Italian peace plan. Bonnet was in favor of the Italian plan for a conference, but needed the approval of the French cabinet and complained that Daladier refused to call a cabinet meeting to discuss Mussolini's conference. Daladier told Sir Eric Phipps, the British ambassador in Paris, that would rather resign than attend the proposed conference and that it would be a "second Munich".

On the morning of 1 September 1939, Germany invaded Poland. Corbin telephoned the Foreign Office to ask how best Britain and France should co-ordinate the declarations of war on Germany. Bonnet had sent a message to London asking that Britain and France instead attend the proposed conference with no time limit while St. Léger insisted on a time limit. Faced with a choice between obeying the foreign minister vs. the secretary-general, Corbin chose the latter. Corbin distorted Bonnet's message by arguing for a time limit for German acceptance on attending the conference, which caused much confusion when Bonnet continued to insist that there would be no time limit. As Bonnet did not wish to see France declare war, he decided to take up the mediation offer made by Mussolini and instructed Corbin in a phone call at 3:40 pm to tell Chamberlain that he wanted a British commitment to attend Mussolini's proposed conference. However, at 4:10 pm on 1 September 1939, Corbin telephoned Bonnet to say that Lord Halifax had told him that Britain would not take part in the Italian plan for a peace conference unless Germany pulled out all of its forces from Poland immediately.

At 5:30 pm, Corbin tele-texted the instructions that Lord Halifax had given to Henderson to Bonnet to indicate the direction that British policy was going. On the evening of 2 September 1939, a major crisis emerged in Britain, as no declaration of war had been issued, which led to a "sit-down strike" at 10 Downing Street as the Chancellor of the Exchequer, Sir John Simon, previously regarded as one of the men most loyal to Chamberlain, refused to leave 10 Downing Street until he received a promise that Britain would declare war on Germany. As a sign of Allied solidarity, it was felt necessary to time the Anglo-French declarations of war on Germany together, but a major battle in the French cabinet between Daladier who wanted to declare war vs. Bonnet who wanted to renounce the alliance with Poland instead made that impossible. A further issue was that France needed to mobilise six million men in the event of war. At 10: 45 am on 2 September, Corbin was received at 10 Dowding Street by Chamberlain. Chamberlain told Corbin: "Public opinion unanimously considers the Italian offer to be trap, intended to favor the advance of the German armies into Poland by immobilising the Allied forces. Britain is definitely united now, but the country is beginning to be seriously disturbed by the vacillating attitude of the French government. We cannot wait any longer. If necessary, we shall act alone".Corbin issued a press statement on 2 September 1939 in response to angry British callers to remind them that France had to mobilise six million men, which meant a massive degree of disruption to the French economy, and that if Britain had to call up a similar number of men to the colors all at once, that too would take some time.

With the backdrop of heavy thunderstorm, Corbin was summoned to 10 Downing Street on the evening of 2 September and discovered a scene of chaos with Chamberlain, Lord Halifax and Cadogan all telephoning Paris in attempts to get hold of Daladier, Bonnet or anybody else in the French government who might be able to tell them what was going on in France. Corbin was told by Chamberlain that his government was on the verge of collapse and predicted the House of Commons would pass a motion of no-confidence against his government at its next session if he did not make a decision to declare war on Germany at once. Corbin informed Chamberlain that the French cabinet was badly divided between Daladier and Bonnet and that he did not know when France would make a decision to declare war. Chamberlain also had Corbin speak to Simon to assure him that the reason for the delay in declaring war was the crisis in Paris, not because the prime minister was seeking a way to avoid honouring his commitments to Poland. Corbin was told at about 11:30 pm that the cabinet had approved of the decision to send an ultimatum to Germany at 9 am on the morning of September 3 that would expire at 11 am, and there was to be no co-ordination with France in presenting the declarations of war.

At 9 am on Sunday 3 September 1939, Henderson handed over the ultimatum to Ribbentrop demanding Germany cease its war against Poland at once and failing that Britain would declare war at 11 am that day. At 9: 45 am, Corbin received a phone call from Churchill who just been appointed the First Lord of the Admiralty who demanded to know why France was not at war. When Corbin stated that it was "technical difficulties" owing to the mobilisation that had started on 1 September, Churchill shouted "Technical difficulties be damned! I suppose you would call it a technical difficulty for a Pole if a German bomb fell on his head!". Shortly after 11 am, King George VI went on the BBC to announce Britain was at war following the German rejection of the British ultimatum. About 10 minutes after the king had announced that the United Kingdom was at war, Corbin received at the French Embassy two Labour MPs, Hugh Dalton and A. V. Alexander, both of whom accused France of avoiding its obligation to Poland. Corbin promised the two MPs that the France would be at war later that day, leading Dalton to point to his watch and say: "My country is at war now in fulfilment of our pledge to Poland". Corbin snapped back that: "And my country will be at war in a few hours time". Corbin pointed out that since 1 September France had mobilised three million men and would have a total of six million men mobilised within a few more days which represented a much greater contribution to the Allied cause than what Britain could make at present and that it was France would take the heaviest blow.

At 12:30 pm, Robert Coulondre, the French ambassador in Berlin, handed over the ultimatum to Ribbentrop saying France would declare war at 5 pm the same day if Germany did not end its war against Poland. For the first time since 1820, the House of Commons met on a Sunday. Chamberlain had called for a special Sunday session of the House of Commons to announce that Britain was now at war. Corbin was present in the visitors gallery of the House, and the MP Beverley Baxter noted that Corbin seemed calm as he watched from the gallery as "his fine, pale face is utterly impassive, his delicate hands are always still". Sitting next to Corbin on one side was the Polish ambassador Count Edward Raczyński, whom Baxter described as looking like a man who had not slept for the last several days. On the other side of Corbin sat the American ambassador Joseph P. Kennedy Sr. who had strongly supported appeasement and seemed visibly upset that war had just begun. Joining Kennedy were two of his sons, Joseph P. Kennedy Jr. and John F. Kennedy, who chattered with the assembled ambassadors. Maisky was also present in the visitor's gallery, but Baxter noted that he had become very unpopular in London on the account of the Molotov–Ribbentrop pact, and that the other ambassadors did their best to ignore him.

==== From Phoney War to Fall of France ====
In the fall of 1939 and the winter of 1940, Corbin was closely involved in the Anglo-French discussions about war aims. The French wanted to undo the Anschluss, insisting that Austria be restored, but the British were willing to accept Austria as part of Germany; finally a compromise where after the Allied victory, a plebiscite would be held to determine if the Austrians wanted their independence back or not. Both the French and the British agreed on restoring Czechoslovakia, but the British held to the frontiers imposed by the Munich Agreement, signaling a willingness to leave the Sudetenland as part of Germany while the French wanted Czechoslovakia restored to the pre-Munich frontiers. However, on other issues, agreement was more possible with both the French and British agreeing that Poland was to be restored and all of the land annexed by Germany was to be returned to Poland, through the question of whatever the parts of Poland annexed by the Soviet Union were to be restored was left ambiguous with British officials noting that most of the people in the areas annexed by the Soviets were not Polish. Finally, both the French and British agreed that it was not possible to make peace with Hitler, and a new government was needed in Germany, through the British were most insistent that the Allies offer lenient peace terms to post-Hitler government, arguing that a promise of a harsh peace would only drive more Germans to Hitler.

During the Phoney War, in February 1940, Count Edward Bernard Raczyński, the ambassador in London representing the Polish government-in-exile, appealed to Corbin for help in seeking a British statement that German war criminals would be punished after the Allied victory. In January 1940, the Polish government-in-exile published a press statement detailing widespread German crimes in Poland right from the start of the war on 1 September 1939 and asked that the perpetrators of these crimes be punished after the Allied victory. Both Corbin and Raczyński noted there was a precedent by citing the Anglo-French-Russian declaration of May 1915, which called the Armenian genocide a "crime against humanity", which was the first use of the term, and promised to bring the leaders of the Ottoman Empire to justice after the Allied victory though the failure to start war crimes trials for the leaders of the Committee of Union and Progress in 1919-1922 for political reasons was a less auspicious precedent. At the time, it was the hope of the British government that the Wehrmacht would overthrow Hitler and so the British government was absolutely opposed to idea of punishing German officials and officers for war crimes in Poland in the belief that a statement promising to do so might frighten the Wehrmacht into staying loyal to Hitler. It was only in 1941–1942 after the British finally lost patience with the Wehrmacht, which stayed resolutely loyal to Hitler, that they finally became willing to issue statements promising to bring war criminals to justice.

On 28 March 1940, Corbin took part in an Anglo-French summit in London that issued the first public declaration of Allied war aims and signed a treaty under both Britain and France promised not to make a separate peace with Germany. On the British side, the British delegation consisted of Chamberlain, Lord Halifax, and Cadogan while the French delegation consisted of Paul Reynaud, César Campinchi Maurice Gamelin and Alexis St. Léger.

Corbin joined Raczyński in February to April 1940 seeking to lobby Lord Halifax to issue a statement promising to bring war criminals to justice, despite Halifax's objections that such a statement would only make the Wehrmacht more loyal to Hitler. Halifax took the view that the Allies should be trying to divide the Nazis from the Wehrmacht, which meant no commitments to war crimes trials. After much lobbying, Raczyński and Corbin got Lord Halifax to issue a joint Anglo-French-Polish statement saying the countries held "the German government responsible for these crimes and they affirm their determination to right the wrongs inflicted on the Polish people". The statement of 18 April 1940 accused Germany of "brutal attacks upon the civilian population of Poland in defiance of the accepted principles of international law" and of "a policy deliberately aiming at the destruction of the Polish nation" and mentioned the "atrocious treatment" inflicted on the Jewish community of Poland. However, Lord Halifax told Corbin and Raczyński that the British regarded the statement of 18 April 1940 as only a "statement of principle", not a "contractual obligation" like the Anglo-French-Russian Declaration of 1915, and that his government was still opposed to the war crimes trials. He repeated his standard claim the Allies should try to divide the Wehrmacht from the Nazis.

On 5 June 1940, Corbin filed a dispatch which noted that the Dunkirk evacuation had saved the British Expeditionary Force and that every British military and naval leader he had spoken to had expressed profound gratitude for the French role in the evacuation. However, Corbin expressed reservations about the future direction of the Churchill government, which he felt was going to be more concerned with the Commonwealth and the British empire than France. Corbin argued that his main duty now was to ensure the Churchill government remained focused on France.

Corbin was with Jean Monnet on 16 June 1940 when the proposal for the union of France and United Kingdom was put to Charles de Gaulle, who had been sent to London by the French Premier Paul Reynaud. The proposed Declaration of Union was a desperate last-minute attempt to bolster French resistance in the face of defeatism among the ranks of the French cabinet to keep the Franco-British alliance alive. (Note: For further details of the proposed union between Britain and France, see Edward Spears#French reject Franco-British Union) De Gaulle was staying at the Hyde Park Hotel and was shaving when Corbin and Monnet burst into his room to bring their plan for an Anglo-French union to keep France in the war. De Gaulle was hostile to the plan for Anglo-French union on philosophical grounds, but he was prepared to accept anything that might keep France in the war since he knew full well that Reynaud was losing the cabinet debates with Marshal Pétain, who was openly defeatist and urging the French cabinet to sign an armistice with Germany. On the afternoon of 16 June, de Gaulle and Corbin met with the British Cabinet, which approved of the plan, and as such Churchill and de Gaulle signed the statement of Anglo-French union declaring that the United Kingdom and France were now united in "the unyielding resolution in their common defense of freedom and justice, against subjection to a system which reduces mankind to a life of robots and slaves".

Under the statement of Anglo-French union, the French National Assembly and the British Parliament were to become one; there was to be single War Cabinet in charge of all Anglo-French forces all over the world; and there were to be joint organs for the direction of financial, economic, foreign and military policies. Churchill congratulated de Gaulle on signing the statement of union by saying that he was going to become the Commander-in-chief of all the Anglo-French forces in the world, but King George VI was not informed of the plan and was openly hostile when he heard about it. The king was heard to wonder aloud if the union of the French republic and the British monarchy now meant he was out of a job. Reynaud embraced the plan for Anglo-French union, but Pétain rejected it as a British plan to take over the French colonial empire and convinced the French Cabinet to reject it. On 17 June 1940, Reynaud's government fell after the 9 ministers came out against his plans to continue the war and for the Anglo-French union and President Albert Lebrun appointed Pétain as the new premier.

The first action of the new Pétain government was to announce that France would seek an armistice with Germany. In response, de Gaulle went on the BBC on 18 June 1940 in a radio address to denounce Petain and to say he would continue the war from exile. Despite Pétain's intention to seek an armistice, Corbin reassured Lord Halifax (who remained Foreign Secretary in the Churchill government) that Hitler was bound to impose such harsh armistice terms that Pétain would be forced to reject those terms and continue the war. On 21 June 1940, France signed an armistice with Germany. On 23 June 1940, de Gaulle announced the formation of a French National Committee, which the British supported but did not recognize as a government-in-exile, unlike for Poland, Czechoslovakia, Norway, the Netherlands and Belgium.

=== Resignation as ambassador and rest of World War II ===
On 26 June 1940, Corbin resigned as the French ambassador to the Court of St. James by saying he could not go on. Corbin told Lord Halifax that day it was a "sad decision" to resign but that Roger Cambon, who would take over the embassy, was a capable man. De Gaulle asked for Corbin not to resign but to represent his National Committee to the British government. Corbin refused under the grounds that the war was lost and that he was now leaving for Brazil while there was still time. Corbin in one of his last acts as ambassador advised the British not to be too closely associated with de Gaulle's National Committee by saying that would make de Gaulle appear to be a British puppet. Both Corbin and St. Léger who had just fled to Britain warned that French republican traditions associated leading a government-in-exile with the betrayal of France, and that de Gaulle was too unknown to be the leader of a credible government-in-exile. Corbin made his "tender farewells" to his friends in Britain and left for Brazil in July 1940. De Gaulle's biographer, Jean Lacouture, states that Corbin resigned from the Quai d'Orsay but retired to South America.

Corbin was greatly angered by the British attack on the French naval base at Mers-el-Kébir on 3 July 1940 and said that he could not in good conscience remain in a country that had just attacked his own nation. Corbin was also further angered by the decision of the new Churchill government to extend the British blockade of Germany to France after 21 June 1940 and frankly Francophobic tone of the British media in the summer of 1940, which openly mocked the French as cowards and defeatists for signing the armistice with Germany. For an Anglophile like Corbin, the sustained anti-French bashing of the British media, which sneered at and mocked the French for the misfortune of losing to Germany was a very bitter blow and hurt him deeply. In the summer of 1940, with Britain facing a German invasion, there was a tendency on the part of the many in the British media to blame the French for the United Kingdom's predicament as it far easier to blame their country's problems on foreigners, which explains the extended bout of French-bashing in 1940.

Corbin arrived in Rio de Janeiro in August 1940, where he was described as being a deeply depressed man, who was convinced that Germany was going to win the war and the "New Order in Europe" could not be challenged. In December 1940, Corbin made his peace with the "New Order in Europe" by saying in a public statement he awaited for instructions from Marshal Petain in Vichy for what his role would be in the "New Order". He then denied making the statement to his friends, which caused him a major credibility crisis, with many uncertain about where he stood. In February 1941, Corbin arrived in Lisbon, where Daniel Roché, the second secretary of the French legation in Dublin, tried to persuade him to go back to Brazil. Sir Ronald Campbell, the British ambassador to Portugal, wrote after meeting Corbin that "he struck me as rather bitter and distinctly flabby.... There is no fight in him and he gives the impression of a broken man". Campbell further wrote that Corbin was extremely embittered by Mers-el-Kébir, which he took as a personal betrayal, and that Corbin was obsessed with "the ghastly spectacle of starving children" in France, which he blamed on the British blockade.

In March 1941, Corbin arrived in Madrid, where Hoare, who was now serving as the British ambassador to Spain, reported to London that Corbin was a "defeatist" who believed Germany was "invincible". Once Corbin arrived in France later in March 1941, his "black mood" finally lifted, and he refused an offer from Marshal Petain to serve as the ambassador in Washington. Instead, Corbin retired to his cottage in southern France, where his private letters became sharply critical of Vichy. However, he did not take part in the Resistance and said that he was too old for such activities. The British historian Nicholas Atkin described Corbin's attitude as ambivalent, as he was opposed in principle to the "New Order" but was also convinced for a considerable period of time, at least until 1942, that Germany was going to win the war and that resistance was futile.

== Death ==
Corbin died on 25 September 1970 at Neuilly-sur-Seine.

== Books ==
- Atkin, Nicholas (2003). The forgotten French : exiles in the British Isles, 1940-44. Manchester: Manchester University Press. ISBN 1-4237-0646-3. OCLC 191936028.
- Barbieri, Pierpaolo (2015). Hitler's Shadow Empire Nazi Economics and the Spanish Civil War. Cambridge: Harvard University Press. ISBN 9780674426252.
- Bosco, Andrea (2016). June 1940, Great Britain and the First Attempt to Build a European Union. Cambridge: Cambridge University Press. ISBN 9781443896382.
- Cameron, Elizabeth (1953). "Alexis Saint-Léger-Léger". In Gordon A. Craig & Felix Gilbert (ed.). The Diplomats 1919-1939. Princeton: Princeton University Press. pp. 378–405.
- Carley, Michael Jabara (1999). 1939: The Alliance That Never Was and the Coming of World War II. Ivan Dee: Chicago.
- Charman, Terry (2010). The Day We Went to War. London: Ebury Publishing. ISBN 9780753537787.
- Chin, Rachel (2022). War of Words Britain, France and Discourses of Empire During the Second World War. Cambridge: Cambridge University Press. ISBN 9781009181013.
- Duroselle, Jean-Baptiste (2004). France and the Nazi threat : the collapse of French diplomacy 1932-1939. New York, NY. ISBN 1-929631-15-4. OCLC 55589798.
- Dreifort, John (1991). Myopic Grandeur The Ambivalence of French Foreign Policy Toward the Far East, 1919-1945. Kent State University Press. ISBN 9780873384414.
- Fenby, Jonathan (2012). The general : Charles de Gaulle and the France he saved. New York: Skyhorse Pub. ISBN 978-1-61608-600-8. OCLC 755705014.
- Hucker, Daniel (November 2008). "Franco-British Relations and the Question of Conscription in Britain, 1938-1939". Contemporary European History. 17 (4): 437–456. doi:10.1017/S0960777308004657. S2CID 146494528.
- Hucker, Daniel (July 2011). "Public Opinion between Munich and Prague: The View from the French Embassy". Journal Contemporary British History. 25 (3): 407–425. doi:10.1080/13619462.2011.597551. S2CID 145435987.
- Hucker, Daniel (2016). Public Opinion and the End of Appeasement in Britain and France. London: Routledge. ISBN 9781317073543.
- Kochavi, Arieh J. (2000). Prelude to Nuremberg : Allied war crimes policy and the question of punishment. Raleigh: University of North Carolina Press. ISBN 0-8078-6687-3. OCLC 45843979.
- Lacouture, Jean. De Gaulle: The Rebel 1890–1944 (1984; English ed. 1991), ISBN 978-0-841-90927-4
- Overy, Richard; Wheatcroft, Andrew (1989). The road to war. London: Vintage Books. ISBN 978-1-84595-130-6. OCLC 437091696.
- Overy, Richard (2009). 1939 : countdown to war. New York. ISBN 978-0-14-312006-3. OCLC 706024300.
- Rostow, Nicholas; Kleibrink, Alexander (1984). Anglo-French Relations 1934-36. London: Palgrave Macmillan. ISBN 9781349173709.
- Southworth, Herbert S (2021). Guernica! Guernica! A Study of a Journalism, Diplomacy, Propaganda, and History. Los Angeles: University of California Press. ISBN 9780520369269.
- Thomas, Martin (1999). "France and the Czechoslovak Crisis". In Lukes, Igor; Goldstein, Erik (eds.). The Munich crisis, 1938 : prelude to World War II. London: Frank Cass. ISBN 0-7146-4995-3. OCLC 40862187.
- Young, Robert (2005). An Uncertain Idea of France: Essays and Reminiscence on the Third Republic. New York: Peter Lang. ISBN 0-8204-7481-9.
- Watt, Donald Cameron (1989). How war came : the immediate origins of the Second World War, 1938-1939. London: Heinemann. ISBN 0-434-84216-8. OCLC 19269229.
- Weinberg, Gerhard (2004). A World In Arms: A Global History of World War Two. Cambridge: Cambridge University Press.
