= Émile Naggiar =

French diplomat (1883–1961)

Paul-Émile Naggiar (3 May 1883 – 28 August 1961) was a French diplomat.

== Consul in Shanghai ==
Naggiar was born in Cairo where his father was serving as a diplomat. His Jewish family had originated in Baghdad before immigrating to France. He was educated at the Ecole des Sciences Politiques in Paris and at the Sorbonne. Naggiar joined the Quai d'Orsay and was appointed the deputy French consul in Shanghai in 1912. From 1915 to 1917, he served as the French consul in Shanghai, placing him in charge of the French Concession as the district of downtown Shanghai that was a French colony was known. He served as the French consul-general in Montreal from 1921 to 1926.

In 1926, Naggair returned to Shanghai as the Consul-general. The year 1927 was an especially troubled time in Shanghai as the city was captured by the Kuomintang and Chinese Communists during the Great Northern Expedition. Shanghai had been ruled by the warlord General Sun Chuanfang until March 1927, and it was widely believed the new rulers in Shanghai would seek to end all of the foreign concessions in China. There had been a number of violent clashes in other Chinese cities as both Britain and Japan forcefully sought to uphold their extra-territorial rights in China against the demands of both the Communists and the Kuomintang for the end of extra-territorial rights.

In a statement issued on 2 April 1927 to the residents of the French Concession, Naggiar declared: "The forces sent by the French government are sufficient to meet any emergency that might arise." He added: "as many rumours were being circulated in order to weaken the morale of the foreign population it was necessary for all residents to be careful not to take them seriously. Security of life and property inside the Concession would be maintained by the French authorities, responsible to their government, by taking all necessary measures". The area around the French Concession was heavily fortified with a gigantic wall with machine-gun posts and barbed wire severing the Concession from the rest of Shanghai, all the more so because France had never actually signed a treaty with China granting the right for a concession in Shanghai and the French Concession rested entirely upon force majeure. The streets that connected the French Concession to the rest of Shanghai all had gates and guard-posts. Naggair had the French garrison in the Concession reinforced by a brigade of the troupes de marine along with colonial troops from Annam (modern Vietnam). To provide additional support, Naggair apparently made a deal with the Green Gang Triad, the most powerful crime syndicate in China, that the police in the French Concession would protect the opium dens, brothels and gambling houses owned by the Green Gang in exchange for the Green Gang using its power to control the Chinese population of the French Concession. The French Concession, where Chinese law did not apply, was to remain a major base for the Green Gang.

On 12 April 1927, the alliance between the Communists and the Kuomintang came to a violent end, marking the start of a long civil war that would not end until 1949. The Kuomintang and the Green Gang joined forces against the Communists and staged several massacres on the streets of Shanghai. When China embroiled in civil war, Chiang Kai-shek announced that his government was committed to peacefully ending the extra-territorial rights of the foreign powers in China, which for Naggair and the French government in general were a major relief. In 1927, he was promoted to be deputy director of the Asia-Pacific department of the Quai d'Orsay.

== Minister in Belgrade ==
Naggiar was a protégé of Alexis St. Léger, the Secretary-General (the number one official) of the Quai d'Orsay. Naggiar was part of an elite group of diplomats whose careers were sponsored by St. Léger that also included René Massigli, Robert Coulondre, Charles Corbin and François Charles-Roux. It was after St. Léger became Secretary-General of the Quai d'Orsay that Naggiar's career began to advance. From 1933 to 1935, Naggiar served as the French minister-plenipotentiary to Yugoslavia. In March 1933, King Alexander rejected Naggiar's advice to end the royal dictatorship and turn Yugoslavia into a federation, saying it would result in anarchy and civil war. During his time in Belgrade, Naggiar repeatedly complained that the French policy of imposing high tariffs on Yugoslav products was weakening French influence in Yugoslavia, all the more so as Germany was all too willing to import Yugoslav agricultural products to feed its people. Ever since the early 1920s, French companies had dominated the automobile and aircraft markets in Yugoslavia with the vast majority of aircraft and automobiles in Yugoslavia being French imports. Yugoslavia was a mostly rural nation and food was its largest export. Naggiar charged that Yugoslavia was falling into the German economic sphere of influence, and inevitably would also fall into the German political sphere of influence as well. In response, Naggiar was told that French farmers disliked competing with Yugoslav farmers in their home market and that Yugoslav farmers did not vote in French elections. In common with the other French minister-plenipotentiaries who served in Belgrade, Naggiar found his positing to be a frustrating one as he watched Yugoslavia fall into the German sphere of influence while his advice was ignored in Paris.

The French Foreign Minister Louis Barthou had a policy of seeking strengthen France's alliances in Eastern Europe. Thought 1934, Naggiar repeatedly invited King Alexander to visit France to meet Barthou in order to strengthen the Franco-Yugoslov alliance, a trip the king was notably reluctant to undertake out of the fear of being assassinated. After surviving several assassination attempts, Alexander did not like to leave the safety of the Royal Palace in Belgrade. When Alexander did agree to visit France, Naggiar wrote to Paris that the French police had to take "absolutely special measures" to protect the king. Naggiar was present when on 9 October 1934 King Alexander of Yugoslavia landed in Marseille to be greeted by Barthou. Naggiar saw both Barthou and King Alexander assassinated later that day during a coach ride down the streets of Marseille. After the dual assassinations, Naggiar returned to Belgrade. The Yugoslav Foreign Minister Bogoljub Jevtić confronted him with evidence that the assassins had been working in the pay of Italy and Hungary, leading him to tell Naggier: "The abominable crime of Marseille proves that political assassination is now one of the methods used by certain governments. If we want to keep the peace in Europe, we must put an end to this scandal once and for all". The new French Foreign Minister Pierre Laval wanted an understanding with Benito Mussolini, and was not willing to confront Rome over the assassinations despite the ample evidence that the assassins were indeed working for Italy. Naggiar was forced to tell his hosts that France was not interested in exploring who was ultimately responsible for the murders. The matter was referred to the League of Nations whose committee of experts ignored all of the evidence that implicated Italian officials in the dual assassinations such as a number of phone calls the assassins made to Rome and instead issued a report that mildly criticized Hungary for providing the forged Czechoslovak passports that allowed the assassins to travel to France. In 1935, Milan Stojadinović became the Yugoslav prime minister. Stojadinović charged that the Yugoslav-French relationship was a highly unequal one with French tariffs keeping Yugoslav agricultural products out while French manufacturers dominated the industrial market of Yugoslavia. Stojadinović came to view closer economic relations with Germany as Yugoslavia's salvation from the Great Depression, and moved Yugoslavia closer to the Reich.

== Minister In Prague ==
From 3 June 1935 to 26 March 1936, Naggiar served as the French minister-plenipotentiary to Czechoslovakia. During his time in Prague, Naggiar tried to effect a reconciliation between France's two quarreling Eastern European allies, Poland and Czechoslovakia. In January 1936, Naggiar reported to Paris that the Czechoslovak President Edvard Beneš was highly worried about the possibility that Germany might remilitarize the Rhineland in the near-future. As long as the Rhineland was demilitarized, there was a possibility of French offensive into western Germany should the Reich invade Czechoslovakia, which France signed an alliance with in 1924. If the Rhineland was remilitarized, Germany would be able to fortify the Franco-German border to block any French offensive and shift the entire might of the Wehrmacht against Czechoslovakia, which was the subject was of such concern in Prague.

== Ambassador in Nanking ==
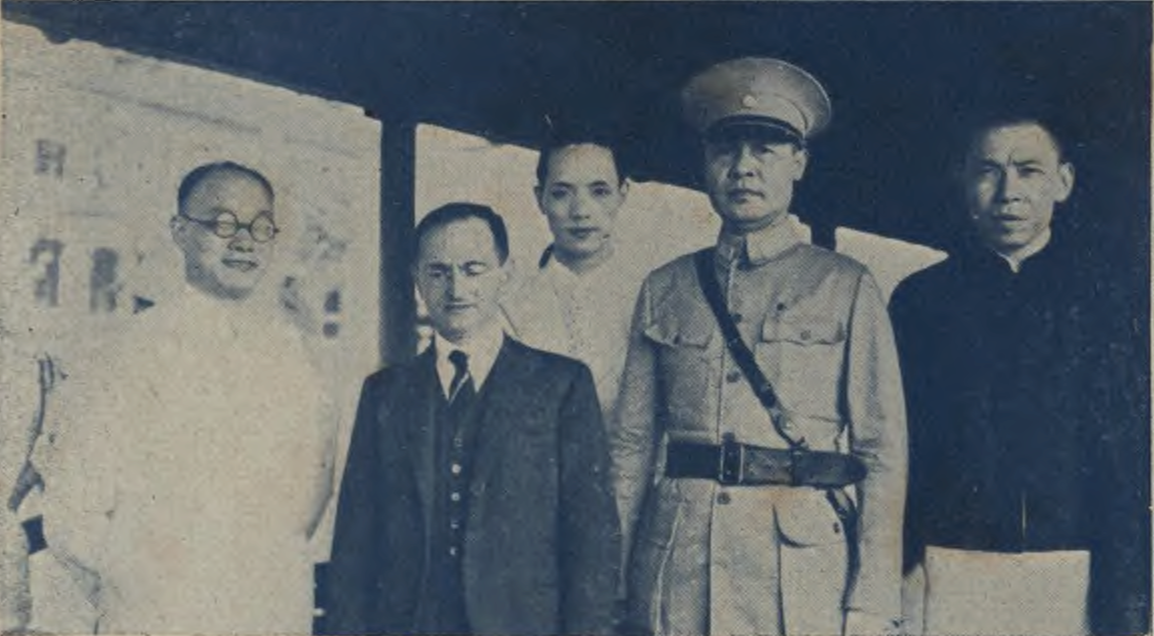
Naggier (second from the left) in China, 1936

Naggiar then served as the French ambassador to China. During his time in China, he was supportive of French efforts to assist with the modernization of China. It was felt by St. Léger that a stronger China would be more able to resist Japan, and that in turn this would protect the French colony of Indochina from Japan. However, Naggiar felt that France should be careful not to provoke Japan too much as believed that China was a very backward nation that would considerable time to modernize.

== Ambassador in Moscow ==
=== Arrival in Moscow ===
In October 1938, Coulondre-who had been serving as the French ambassador in Moscow-was sent to Berlin. Naggiar was sent to replace Coulondre and arrived in Moscow in February 1939. Naggiar was known as an advocate of closer ties with the Soviet Union to create a counterbalance to Germany. On 8 February 1939, Naggiar first met the Soviet Foreign Commissar Maxim Litvinov. Litvinov, a sophisticated diplomat who spoke fluent French and English, told Naggiar that his country was willing to co-operate with Britain and France to uphold collective security under the banner of the League of Nations, but that "we are not going to beg". The Soviet account, though not the French account, of the meeting had Naggiar saying to Litvinov that he was opposed to the "capitulationist policy" of his government. The next day, Naggiar met the deputy foreign commissar, Vladimir Potemkin, who complained that French foreign policy in Eastern Europe under the Foreign Minister Georges Bonnet was too passive. Naggiar protested that this was a "premature" conclusion to draw, and that France was still engaged in Eastern Europe. Upon reading Naggiar's reports, Bonnet sent "an audacious cable" to Moscow that claimed that he upheld the principle of collective security during the Sudetenland crisis, a message that Naggiar felt was painful to hand over to Litvinov.

Litvinov privately admitted to Naggiar his dismay over the way that the Yezhovshchina ("Yezhov times") had crippled the Narkomindel with many of the best Soviet diplomats executed on spurious charges of treason, leaving behind a collection of cowed mediocrities. Litvinov sadly told Naggiar: "How can I conduct foreign policy with the Lubyanka across the way?" The British historian D.C. Watt described Naggiar as a man who hated the atmosphere in Moscow, but was able to negotiate successfully with the Narkomindel by "cutting through formulas". As Joseph Stalin was only the First Secretary of the Communist Party of the Soviet Union, he held no position in the Soviet government and as such, Naggiar rarely saw him. Stalin was a rather mysterious character whom the foreigners were not usually allowed to see unless something especially noteworthy was happening. The French historian Jean-Baptiste Duroselle described Naggiar as not have the "same stature" within the Quai d'Orsay comparable to that possessed by Corbin and Coulondre, but that his reports from both China and the Soviet Union showed a "deep understanding" of both nations. Naggiar did not speak Russian, was not allowed to travel outside of Moscow and was constantly watched by the NKVD, which limited his ability to gauge Soviet society in general.

Naggiar described his relations with St. Léger as being "loyal, but critically affectionate". Naggiar's relations with Bonnet were difficult as both men disliked and distrusted each other. In common with other French ambassadors such as Robert Coulondre in Berlin, Charles Corbin in London, Léon Noël in Warsaw, and André François-Poncet in Rome, Naggiar charged that Bonnet was very secretive; prone to dishonesty; and tended to execute a parallel foreign policy by using the pro-Nazi French journalist Fernand de Brinon as his contact with Berlin that undercut the foreign policy of the Quai d'Orsay. On 22 February 1939, in a meeting with Litvinov, Naggiar heard the accusation that the recent visit of de Brinon to Rome was part of an Anglo-French plot against the Soviet Union as the notes record: "The Commissar believe that this journalist was backing the well known German plan to conquer the Ukraine that is viewed by some people in France and England as a miracle drug that will save the two countries from Italo-German threats". Naggiar protested that de Brinon had no position with the French government and he was speaking for himself in Rome. Naggiar sought to assure a skeptical Litvinov that France was still committed to the 1935 alliance despite the way that Franco-Soviet staff talks had been cancelled in 1937.

In a report to Paris, Naggiar wrote that he felt that the Soviet Union was "at crossroads", being torn by the desire to resume the League of Nations-based collective security policy that Litvinov had championed vs. a more "selfish" foreign policy associated with Stalin. Naggiar wrote: "We run the risk of seeing it [the Soviet Union] pursue along its western borders the organization of its own security system. Such a system could include, with Germany assisted by Poland and possibility Italy, an economic and technical collaboration which would free up the Reich from any worry on that end and provide the raw materials and freedom of movement that are indispensable required for a final settling of accounts with the West". Like Coulondre in Berlin, Naggiar warned that it was possible for a Soviet-German rapprochement to occur.

=== The Danzig crisis ===
During the Danzig crisis in 1939, Naggiar was an advocate of the "peace front" as the proposed alliance of the Soviet Union, France and Britain that was intended to deter Germany from invading Poland. Described as "a methodical and serious person", Naggiar worked hard during the Danzig crisis for an alliance with the Soviet Union. During the Danzig crisis, the French were more committed to achieving an alliance with the Soviet than the British. In April 1939, the French General Staff drew up a report for the French cabinet that showed Germany and Italy combined would commit 250 divisions to war against the 110 divisions that Britain and France combined could muster for war. General Maurice Gamelin insisted that France needed allies to redress the numerical superiority of the Axis states, and that France's allies in Eastern Europe, namely Poland, Romania and Yugoslavia could muster up a combined force of 110 divisions while Greece and Turkey (both of which were broadly pro-Allied) could add another 50 divisions. However, the report was dismissive of the quality of the armies of Eastern Europe and insisted that France's only hope of victory was with an alliance with the Soviet Union. The report stated that both Poland and Romania could at best hold against Germany for a few months and that only assistance from the Soviet Union would allow those states to resist German invasions. The belief that the Red Army with its 250 divisions could level the odds was the main reason why French decision-makers tended to more supportive of the "peace front" with the Soviet Union than British decision-makers. At a meeting of the British cabinet on 5 April 1939, the prime minister Neville Chamberlain stated that the Polish Army was stronger than the Red Army, and as such Britain did not really need an alliance with the Soviet Union.

On 4 May 1939, Litvinov was sacked as Foreign Commissar and replaced with Vyacheslav Molotov. Naggiar described Molotov as being very different from Litvinov who at least tried to be friendly, unlike the "hard man" Molotov who was utterly devoid of any warmth. Naggiar reported that Molotov had a "rude simplicity" in his manners and was intentionally obnoxious. The dominant impression Naggiar had of Molotov was of a very hard, ruthless man who never smiled. Naggiar described Molotov as having a stern, cold manner as hate and rage were the seemingly the only emotions he was capable of expressing, but that he was extremely tenacious in his negotiating style and had a good understanding of the issues despite having been abroad only once. Molotov could read some French, but he spoke French very badly, and preferred to speak in Russian with a deputy translating for him. Potemkin who was fluent in both French and English usually served as Molotov's translator, a position that Potemkin found humiliating, which led him to lash out against the British and French diplomats he translated for. Naggiar reported that Molotov wanted a full military alliance as "the new commissar now intends to obtain more extensive advantages". In a report to Bonnet, Naggiar charged that frequent leaks from the Quai d'Orsay to the Paris newspapers were making the talks more difficult as the "spectacular publicity" of the leaks had caused the always suspicious Soviets to be even more paranoid than usual.

Naggiar believed that Poland was too weak to defend itself against Germany and would require the help of the Soviet Union. In turn, he was highly critical of the Polish Foreign Minister Colonel Józef Beck who refused to grant the Red Army transit rights in the event of a German invasion under the grounds that the Red Army would not leave Poland. Naggiar warned Paris that he believed if the issue of transit rights were not resolved, it was possible that the Soviet Union might reach an agreement with Germany instead. Naggiar argued that the best way of preventing the Danzig crisis from escalating into a war was a "classical" military alliance with the Soviet Union. Naggiar felt it would be better if Colonel Beck along with King Carol II of Romania were to willingly grant the Red Army transit rights, but that the issue of transit rights should be not allowed to wreck the talks for the "peace front". Naggiar charged that Bonnet's tactic of reaching a political agreement first before signing a military convention while not addressing the issue of the transit rights was designed to ensure that the "peace front" talks failed. In a report to Bonnet, Naggiar wrote: "The puerile idea is that we will force Hitler to back down with words, without the only reality which will cause him to reflect: the assent of Poland to a military accord with Russia". In another report, Naggiar wrote: "London and Paris continue not to want to understand what is essential in these negotiations: a military agreement which would permit Russia to make geographic contact with Germany to replicate the military conditions of 1914".

On 1 and 3 June 1939, Naggiar along with the British ambassador Sir William Seeds met with Molotov to concede on many of the Soviet demands as the price of an alliance. The second meeting was joined by Sir William Strang, the director of the Foreign Office's Central Department, who been sent out from London to facilitate the talks. When Strang arrived in Moscow, Naggiar asked him: "...point-blank whether our Government really wanted to come to an agreement with the Soviet Union or were they merely going through the motions?". At the second meeting on 3 June, Molotov sat on a high desk and forced Naggiar, Strang, Seeds and Potemkin to sit on chairs arranged in a semi-circle around his desk. Naggiar, Strang and Seeds were not provided with level surfaces and were forced to write their notes of the meeting on their knees despite a conference table being besides Molotov's desk. There was a doorway leading to another room that was always open in Molotov's office, which was apparently meant to symbolize that the Soviet Union was still open to an agreement. Watt noted that Molotov "seemed quite impervious to argument" as he announced bluntly that an alliance would be on Soviet terms. On 2 June 1939, Molotov presented a draft treaty that committed the Soviet Union, France and Britain to automatically declare war on Germany in the event of aggression against Poland, Romania, Turkey, Greece, Belgium, Latvia, Estonia and Finland. Unlike the British draft treaty of 27 May 1939, Molotov's draft excluded Switzerland, Luxembourg and the Netherlands from the nations that were to protected.

The terms of the Soviet draft treaty were rejected by both Britain and France as the governments of Finland, Estonia and Latvia all stated that they did not wish to be associated with the proposed "peace front" against Germany, especially if the Soviet Union were involved. The British and French replies stated that only nations that consented to join the "peace front" were to be covered by the proposed alliance, a demand that Molotov rejected outright. A clerk with the Foreign Office, John Herbert King, had sold the British diplomatic codes to the NKVD, and as such, Molotov knew in advance about the British reply, which allowed him to prepare his response. Naggiar reported to Paris that the debate in the House of Commons on 8 June 1939 had done much damage to Britain's image in the Soviet Union. During the debates, Chamberlain along with the Foreign Secretary Lord Halifax and the Chancellor of the Exchequer Sir John Simon, had all stated that Britain was prepared to examine the German demand for lebensraum ("living space") as the price of ending the Danzig crisis peacefully. Naggiar wrote that in Moscow: "what is singled out is that England, despite appearances, is not yet fully committed to the policy of resisting aggression".

At the next meeting on 15 June 1939, Molotov behaved towards Naggiar, Seeds and Strang like "a prosecuting counsel cross-examining a recalcitrant witness" as he proceeded to relentlessly hammer his visitors. On 21 June and 22 June, Naggiar, Seeds and Strang all attempted to persuade Molotov unsuccessfully to alter the draft treaty to only include nations that wanted to be part of the "peace front", a demand that Molotov rejected. Naggiar was highly critical of British policy, writing that orders given to Seeds and Strang by Lord Halifax "appeared to be useless and even out of place in that they were encouraging the suspicion of the leaders of the USSR". For an example, Molotov's draft treaty called for "immediate and effective assistance" to Poland in the event of a German invasion while Lord Halifax's draft treaty for called the states involved to provide to Poland "all the assistance immediately at its disposal", which Molotov objected to in his usual fierce way. On 22 June 1939, Naggiar presented a compromise to Molotov, which he rejected out of hand as he asserted that only the Soviet version was acceptable to his government. Naggiar reported to Paris that with the Danzig crisis having pushed Europe to the brink of war that now was not the time for semantic squabbles and that France should accept the Soviet draft with its call for "immediate and effective assistance" to Poland as a way to pressure the British to accept it.

On 29 June 1939, Andrei Zhdanov, the Communist Party boss of Leningrad and one of the most closest associates of Stalin published an article on the front page of Pravda that accused the French and especially the British of negotiating in bad faith for the "peace front". Naggier reported to Paris that Zhdanov's article was a clear sign of Stalin's displeasure with the tempo of the talks. On 1 July 1939, Seeds and Naggiar met Molotov to make many concessions to the Soviet demands, and offered to have the nations to be protected by the "peace front" listed in a secret protocol instead part of the text released to the public. Molotov exploded in rage when he discovered that Switzerland and the Netherlands were two of the nations to be protected from German aggression by the "peace front". Neither the Dutch nor the Swiss had diplomatic relations with the Soviet Union and Molotov claimed that it was a grave insult to the Soviet Union to ask the Soviets to declare war on Germany on behalf of nations that did not have diplomatic relations with Moscow. At another meeting on 3 July 1939, Molotov informed Seeds and Naggiar that he was willing to have the "peace front" protect the Netherlands and Switzerland, but only on the conditions that Poland and Turkey sign treaties granting the Red Army transit rights in the event of German invasions and for Britain and France to accept the Soviet definition of "indirect aggression". Molotov defined "indirect aggression" as "an internal coup d'état or a reversal of policy in the interests of the aggressor". The subject of "indirect aggression" proved to be the source of much Anglo-French discord as the French premier Édouard Daladier favored accepting the Soviet definition of "indirect aggression" while the British prime minister Neville Chamberlain rejected it. In Moscow, Naggiar's normally cordial relations with Seeds were troubled as Naggiar favored accepting the Soviet definition of "indirect aggression" while Seeds was opposed.

In early July, Sir Orme Sargent of the Foreign Office told ambassador Charles Corbin that the "guarantees" given to Poland on 31 March and Romania on 13 April were a mistake as both Poland and Romania stood between Germany and the Soviet Union, which in effect gave a British "guarantee" of the Soviet Union as well and allowed Molotov to be uncompromising. Upon reading Corbin's report of his conversation with Sargent, Naggiar wrote to St. Léger that Sargent's statement was "a little late; to correct this error, Russia's price has to be paid". About the subject of "indirect aggression", Naggiar wrote: "that due to the influence of the Foreign Office the negotiations might once more get bogged down in discussions about draft changes many of which, while they did affect the heart of the matter,, elicited renewed Soviet counter-charges". On 23 July 1939, Molotov again met with Seeds and Naggiar where he told them that the subject of "indirect aggression" was of minor importance and could be settled later. Instead, he told Seeds and Naggiar that he wanted talks to begin immediately on a military alliance, saying the Danzig crisis was escalating and that time was short. Both Naggiar and Seeds agreed to Molotov's demand that an Anglo-French military mission to arrive in Moscow to work out the details of the military alliance. At the same time, Soviet confidence in Britain was badly shaken by the decision of the Chamberlain government to end the Tientsin incident with Japan by seeking a diplomatic compromise instead of going to war against Japan, a decision that Jakob Suritiz, the Soviet ambassador in Paris, described as a "capitulation" to Japan. Likewise, the unauthorized offer made by a junior British cabinet minister Robert Hudson of a loan to Germany in exchange for a peaceful end to the Danzig crisis led to Soviet fears that Chamberlain was still attempting to work out a deal with Germany at the expense of the Soviet Union as the Soviets did not believe that Hudson was acting on his own. Naggiar reported to Paris that based on his contacts within the Soviet regime that there was "a recrudescence of lack of confidence in Neville Chamberlain's intentions" in Moscow.

Watt wrote that Naggiar had "an acuter mind than poor Sir William Seeds", but like Seeds believed that it was in the Soviet Union's own interests to make an alliance with Britain and France. Naggiar in his reports noted that the Soviets placed much emphasis on staff talks as a sign that the British and French were serious. He wrote that the French themselves were responsible for the Soviet demand that the British and French first sign a military convention to be followed up by an alliance (the opposite order from the normal practice of diplomacy) as the Soviets were intensely unhappy that the 1935 Franco-Soviet alliance was not followed up by a military convention as Franco-Soviet staff talks for a military convention were suspended in 1937. Naggiar reported: "We did not want a military convention, but now both Molotov and Potemkin are saying that without a staff accord there will be no deal". On 4 August 1939, Potemkin told Naggiar that the head of the Soviet delegation to handle the talks with the expected Anglo-French mission was to be the Defense Commissar, Marshal Kliment Voroshilov along with the chief of staff of the Red Army, General Boris Shaposhnikov, saying that this was a sign that Joseph Stalin was serious about the talks. At a meeting with Molotov, Naggiar was questioned about the powers of the Anglo-French military mission.

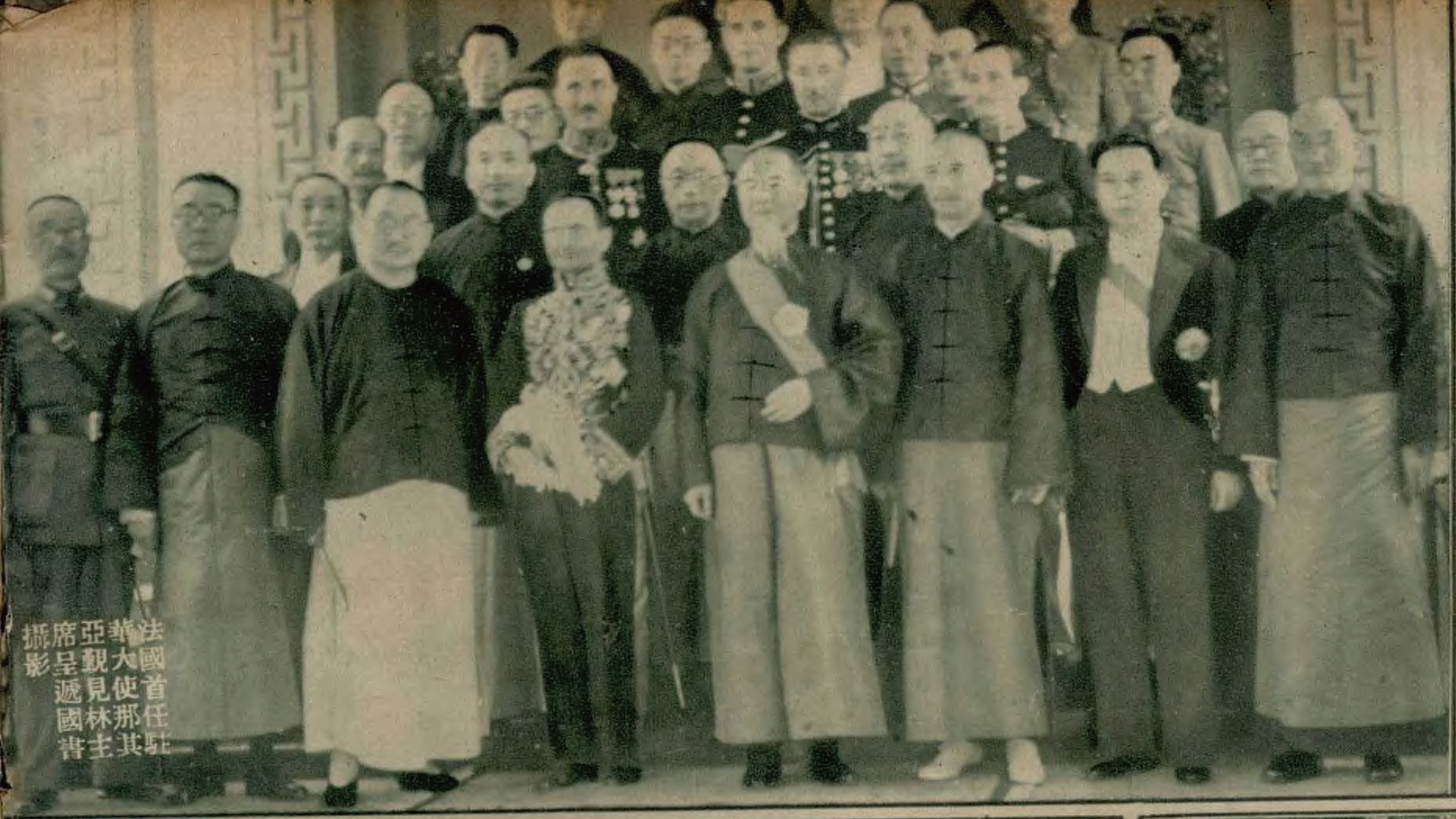
Naggiar fourth from the left in China, 19 July 1936 just after having presented his credentials as the ambassadeur de France to Chairman Lin Sen who stands in the center.

On 10 August 1939, a joint Anglo-French military mission jointly commanded by Admiral Sir Reginald Plunkett-Ernle-Erle-Drax and General Joseph Doumenc arrived in Leningrad and on 11 August 1939 in Moscow with orders to finally negotiate the alliance. The decision to have the Anglo-French military mission not to travel via airplane, but instead make the trip from London to Leningrad on a slow moving ship, The City of Exeter that moved at only 13 knots per hour instead being sent on a fast-moving destroyer or cruiser attracted much critical comment in Moscow. Naggiar told General Doumenc that he had been feeling helpless all through the summer of 1939 as the talks had floundered as he felt: "Paris and London wrangled constantly only to yield too late". Naggiar asked Doumenc: "Did you bring something on the passage [rights] across Poland?" Doumenc told Naggiar that Colonel Beck was adamant about not giving the Red Army transit rights and that the issue appeared to be impossible to resolve. Naggiar complained: "They haven't read or understood my dispatches". Naggiar charged that the Soviets would not sign an alliance unless they were granted transit rights into Poland first and the issue had to be confronted. On 11 August 1939, Naggiar along with Seeds, Admiral Plunkett-Ernle-Erle-Drax, and General Doumnec to meet Molotov at the Kremlin with Molotov, which Naggiar hoped might improve the atmosphere.

Naggiar was shocked when Doumenc told him that Admiral Drax's orders were to engage in talks, but to drag them out for as long as possible. Naggiar in a cable to Paris wrote that he felt that the instructions given to Drax were likely to cause the talks to fail and were "dangerous" unless the British "secretly hoped for the failure of the talks". He was especially angry as the British had promised beforehand that Admiral Drax's mandate was to conclude an alliance as soon as possible and now learned the opposite was the case. The orders given to Admiral Drax by the British Foreign Secretary Lord Halifax stated: "The British delegation is to conduct negotiations very slowly, keeping abreast of the political discussions". By contrast, the French favored having the negotiations for the "peace front" concluded as soon as possible. The two differing tempo of negotiations in turn reflected the views held by the British and French governments on the ultimate desirability of reaching an understanding with the Reich or not. For Chamberlain and Lord Halifax along with Bonnet, the mere act of engaging in negotiations with the Soviet Union was believed to be sufficient to deter Germany from invading Poland, and to actually create the "peace front" alliance was felt to be counterproductive as it would make it more difficult to reach a "general settlement" with Germany. For most French decision-makers, the "peace front" was believed to be the only way of deterring Germany from invading Poland, and both Daladier and St. Léger, though not Bonnet, had little hope of the same sort of understanding with Germany that the British wanted.

Leading the Soviet delegation was Marshal Voroshilov who told Admiral Drax and General Doumenc on 14 August that without transit rights into Poland, an alliance would be impossible as he insisted that his government would only sign an alliance if the transit rights were granted first. Voronshilov stated that under the Anglo-French offer, the Soviet Union would be obliged to declare war on Germany if the Reich invaded Poland, but that the Red Army would not be allowed to enter Poland, which would ensure that Soviet Union would be invaded next as Voronshilov had no confidence in the ability of Poland to defeat Germany. Marshal Voronshilov argued that in his view as a professional soldier, it would be better for the Red Army to engage the Wehrmacht in Poland to wage a "forward defense". Naggiar wrote to Paris that the maximum pressure had to be applied on Colonel Beck as the transit rights issue was on the verge of causing the talks to collapse. In an attempt to save the talks, on 17 August 1939 Captain André Beaufre of the French military mission was sent on an unauthorized visit to Warsaw to tell the Polish leaders that the issue of the transit rights had brought the talks to the brink of collapse and that the "peace front" was the best of deterring Germany from invading Poland. General Stachiewicz, the chief of the Polish general staff, refused the demand for transit rights as he stated: "I cannot believe the Russians really want to fight the Germans...It's too obvious a bluff, it is blackmail...If we allowed them into our territory they would stay there". On 20 August, Beaufre returned to Moscow to report that the Poles would not under any conditions give the Red Army transit rights into Poland. As the talks in Moscow floundered over the issue of transit rights, on 21 August 1939, General Doumnec received orders from Paris to sign a military accord, with or without transit rights across Poland. Naggiar responded by writing back "too late!" On 22 August, Pravda announced that the German Foreign Minister Joachim von Ribbentrop would be visiting Moscow the next day for a highly important meeting with Molotov. Naggiar met with Molotov the same day to ask him to reconsider the planned meeting with Ribbentrop, saying there was still hope for an alliance, only for Molotov to mockingly ask if the Poles had granted the transit rights.

On 23 August 1939, Ribbentrop arrived in Moscow via aeroplane, where he was greeted as a honored guest. After completing the talks with Molotov, Ribbentrop went to the Kremlin to see Stalin and Molotov where he signed the German-Soviet non-aggression pact. The fact that Ribbentrop was received by Stalin at the Kremlin was as Watt noted a sign that "he passed the test" as foreigners were usually not allowed to meet Stalin. As photographs appeared of Molotov and Ribbentrop signing the non-aggression pact while being watched by a smiling Stalin, Naggiar recalled feeling very depressed and heartbroken. In response to the news of the Molotov-Ribbentrop pact, Colonel Beck told the French ambassador in Warsaw Léon Noël: "Really not much has changed". Upon reading Noël's report, Naggiar wrote: "One cannot imagine anything more insane". It was noted in Paris that the text of the Molotov-Ribbentrop pact did not include the standard text of non-aggression pacts under the pact could be renounced if either of the signatory powers committed aggression against a third nation, which led Bonnet to order Naggiar to find out about the reasons for this break with normal diplomatic practice.

== Later life ==
From May 18 to June 3, 1943, he led a French delegation to the United Nations Food and Agriculture Organization in Hot Springs, Virginia. In 1946, Naggiar was a member of the French delegation to the United Nations General Assembly and established the Far East Committee

== Books and articles ==
- Adamthwaite, Anthony (1977). France and the Coming of the Second World War. London: Frank Cass.
- Adriano, Pino; Cingolani, Giorgio (2018). Nationalism and Terror Ante Pavelic and Ustasha Terrorism from Fascism to the Cold War. Budapest: Central European University Press. ISBN 978-963-386-206-3.
- Alexander, Martin S. (1992). The Republic in Danger General Maurice Gamelin and the Politics of French Defence, 1933-1940. Cambridge: Cambridge University Press. ISBN 978-0-521-52429-2.
- Duroselle, Jean-Baptiste (2004). France and the Nazi threat: the collapse of French diplomacy 1932-1939. New York, NY. ISBN 1-929631-15-4. OCLC 55589798.
- Farley, Brigit (2007). "King Aleksandar and the Royal Dictatorship in Yugoslavia". In In Bernd J. Fischer (ed.). Balkan Strongmen: Dictators and Authoritarian Rulers of Southeastern Europe. West Lafayette: Central European Studies. pp. 51–86..
- Hunter, Olivia (Spring 2017). "Crime and Security in Shanghai's French Concession, 1919-1937". The Earlham Historical Journal. XI (2).
- Morton, W. H.; Feldwick, W. (1917). Present Day Impressions of the Far East and Prominent and Progressive Chinese at Home and Abroad The History, People, Commerce, Industries and Resources of China, Hongkong, Indo-China, Malaya and Netherlands India. London: Globe Encyclopedia.
- Carley, Michael Jabara (1999). 1939: The Alliance That Never Was and the Coming of World War II. Ivan Dee: Chicago.
- Leutner, Mechtild (2020). "Chinese Visas for European Refugees, Marseille, 1940/1941: An (Almost) Forgotten Example of International Solidarity". In Nele Noesselt (ed.). China's New Silk Road Dreams. Berlin: Lit Verlag. pp. 144–161. ISBN 978-3-643-91349-4.
- Taylor, Tedford (1979). Munich The Price of Peace. New York: Vintage Books. ISBN 9780394744827.
- Wandycz, Piotr Stefan (2014). The Twilight of French Eastern Alliances, 1926-1936 French-Czechoslovak-Polish Relations from Locarno to the Remilitarization of the Rhineland. Princeton: Princeton University Press. ISBN 9781400859818.
- Watt, Donald Cameron (1989). How war came: the immediate origins of the Second World War, 1938-1939. London: Heinemann. ISBN 0-434-84216-8. OCLC 19269229.
