= Belgium–France relations =

- Belgium: France

Belgium and France maintain interstate relations, as diplomatic relations were established following Belgium’s independence in 1830. The two countries are close allies and share notable cultural affinities. Both are founding members of NATO, the Organisation internationale de la Francophonie, and the European Union as well as the two former African colonies that shaped the French Congo (French Equatorial Africa) of the modern Republic of the Congo in Brazzaville and the Belgian Congo of the modern Democratic Republic of the Congo in Léopoldville (Kinshasa). French serves as an official language of both nations in Europe especially Belgian French.

== History ==
France had occupied and annexed Belgium (then a Habsburg territory) in the 1790s, at a time when France was regularly at war with its neighbours. Belgium was placed under Dutch rule after the Congress of Vienna. In 1830, the Belgian Revolution broke out, and French involvement would prove crucial to securing the emerging nation's independence.

=== Louis de Potter's visit to Paris in 1830 ===
At the moment of the July Revolution in 1830, Belgian revolutionary Louis de Potter and his brother exiles, who were on the road from Mainz to Switzerland, changed their route, and entering France by Strasbourg, proceeded direct to Paris. Their arrival in the French capital was a species of ovation. They were received with exaggerated demonstrations of sympathy and fraternization, the natural offspring of the excited state of public feeling at that moment. They were complimented with banquets, speeches, and toasts, and greeted with a degree of deference not always accorded to men of the most eminent merit in less feverish times. This histrionic display of amity on the part of La Fayette and others, though the mere result of the tinsel policy of the hour, was mistaken for sterling coin by the Belgian exiles. As unaccustomed, as they were perhaps undeserving, of the extraordinary respect shown them both at home and abroad, their vanity was inflated beyond all measure, and they consequently attributed to their own particular virtues that incense which was but the mere ephemeral exhalation of the times. They little dreamed that the triumphant epoch, for which they so ardently sighed, would be the signal for their political discomfiture, and that the tide of popularity, after bearing them up on its stormy billows for a few shortlived hours, would as suddenly ebb, and leave them stranded and forgotten.

In the meanwhile they leagued themselves with the most exaggerated spirits in France, and openly avowed their republican principles, through the medium of the Tribune, a French paper devoted to the movement party. They also availed themselves of their temporary popularity at home to increase the exasperation of their countrymen. In short, had it depended on their will, Belgium would have risen in mass, and France would have thrown an army of occupation into that country; a war of conquest, under the pretext of giving liberal institutions, would have been declared; and those rich and fertile lands, where agriculture, industry, commerce, and the arts are now rapidly recovering their former splendour, would have been converted into a theatre of devastation and the most abject vassalage. But what were the miseries or thraldom of their country to men who had personal hatreds to revenge, and who would probably have been richly rewarded for their labour ? Fortunately, however, the good genius of Europe stood between the apostles of destruction and the people whom they would have sacrificed to their reckless ambition. Whilst this was passing at Paris, the most influential unionists who desired to proceed constitutionally, were busy concerting plans for a vigorous parliamentary campaign. All were bent on a systematic opposition to the government, and on employing every possible stratagem to induce the Dutch members to unite with them in demanding redress of grievances, and a more liberal system of government; but considerable difference of opinion existed as to ultimate proceedings. The whole desired reform and change; but few were actuated with direct hostility to the dynasty. Some there were, however, who inwardly sighed to cast off the Dutch yoke, and eagerly turned their eyes to France.

=== Possible French annexation of Belgium ===
Considering the independence of their country as chimerical as its union with Holland, and actuated by motives not altogether devoid of self-interest, a number of Belgians longed for a rejunction with France, under whose powerful ægis Belgium had already lived secure. Under the plea of curiosity or business, some of them, therefore, hastened to Paris, where they held consultations with the most distinguished men in and out of office, and eagerly sounded the opinion of the government as to its external policy. Nor were arguments wanting to induce it to accept the reunion in the event of a dissolution of the Netherlands monarchy. More confident than politic, more ambitious than patriotic, and more intent on the object of that ambition than on the interests of their country, they not only mistook the line of policy best suited to France, but were as much mystified by the evasive replies of the French ministry as they were deceived as to the strength of the movement party. Maturer consideration, and a more profound knowledge of general politics, would have shown them that the consolidation of Louis Philippe's government mainly depended on its maintaining amicable relations with other nations, and, above all, with Great Britain; that the latter never would consent to Belgium, or any portion of Belgium, again becoming an integral part of France; that French statesmen, however much they might covet the goodly fruit, were not so utterly blind to their own interests, as to balance between general peace and an alliance with England, or general war and a union with Belgium. They forgot that the immense majority, especially of manufacturing and agricultural France, was adverse to all renewed attempts at territorial aggrandizement; which, if successful, could merely serve to admit the improved industry of Belgium and the Rhine to equal competition with their own produce; and that, during fifteen years of peace, an immense social revolution had taken place. The aristocracy of property, which is founded on conservative principles, having superseded the aristocracy of chivalry, which is based on destruction.

It is true, that the promises of the movement leaders, who over-rated their own influence at home, as much as they were deceived as to the real wishes of the majority of the Belgian people, were calculated to mislead the reunionists; but the latter ought to have had sufficient perspicuity to discover that there was no prospect of France entering into their views unless the war party obtained a complete ascendency. The experiment could only be made under the penalty of a general European conflagration; an attempt the less likely, since the majority of the French chambers supported the dynasty; since it was the interest of that dynasty to preserve peace abroad, in order to gain strength at home; and since the prudent conduct of the British cabinet and its allies had removed all pretext for drawing the sword. The sentiments of European nations must not, however, be mistaken. On the one hand, any renewed holy alliance or invasive coalition against France, would have been as unpopular on the Continent as in Great Britain; whilst it would have knit the whole French people in one terrible phalanx, whose repulsive reaction might have brought destruction on every crowned head from the Rhine to the Neva. On the other hand, however much the people of Europe may have applauded the effort made by those of France to assert their liberties at home, had a French army approached the Meuse, though under the pretext of propagating liberal opinions, the first clang of their advancing trumpets would have rallied against them the whole trans-Rhenan population, and would have regenerated all those antipathies that twice brought the allies to the gates of Paris.

=== 19th century ===
After the independence of Belgium in 1830, there were fears that the new country would come under French influence, thus leading to a disruption of the European balance of power of the Concert of Europe. When the peace treaty with the Netherlands was drawn up, the important fortress cities of Luxembourg and Maastricht were given back to the Dutch king. This was to prevent France from controlling these strategic locations at the start of a new general European war.

When Napoleon III came to power in France, he made designs on Belgium. These were later abandoned.

=== Scramble for Africa ===
Pierre Savorgnan de Brazza, an Italian-French explorer, founded Brazzaville on the north bank of the Congo River in 1880, representing the French. The Welsh-American explorer Henry Morton Stanley working for King Leopold II of Belgium, founded Léopoldville (present-day Kinshasa) on the left bank of the Congo River in 1881. These foundations marked the beginning of Belgian and French colonial claims in the Congo, with Leopold II personally owning the territory and using it for resource extraction, while the French also established a colonial presence in Africa. The territory was then renamed the Belgian Congo as a personal private colony while the French Congo became part of French Equatorial Africa with Brazzaville as the capital of the federation and the administration.

=== World War I ===
During World War I, France and Belgium were both on the side of the allies. Belgium was the scene of much fighting between the allies and the German Empire. Following the German occupation of Belgium, the Belgian government-in-exile operated largely from Le Havre in northern France.

=== Interwar ===
The French government was infuriated at King Leopold III's open declaration of neutrality in October 1936. The French Army saw its strategic assumptions undermined; it could no longer expect cooperation from the Belgians in defending Belgium's eastern borders, which would allow it to stop a German attack well forward of the French border. The French were dependent on cooperation from the Belgians. Such a situation deprived the French of any prepared defences in Belgium to forestall an attack, a situation which the French had wanted to avoid as it meant engaging the German Panzer Divisions in a mobile battle. The French considered invading Belgium immediately in response to a German attack on the country. The Belgians, recognising the danger posed by the Germans, secretly made their own defence policies, troop movement information, communications, fixed defence dispositions, intelligence and air reconnaissance arrangements available to the French military attaché in Brussels.

=== World War II ===
During the German invasion of Belgium in 1940, the Belgians were afforded substantial support by the French Army. The French 1st Army included General René Prioux's Cavalry Corps. The Corps was given the 2nd Light Mechanized Division (2^{e} Division Légère Mécanique, or 2^{e} DLM) and the 3rd Light Mechanized Division (3^{e} DLM), which were allocated to defend the Gembloux gap. The armoured forces consisted of 176 of the formidable SOMUA S35s and 239 Hotchkiss H35 light tanks. Both of these types, in armour and firepower, were superior to most German types. The 3^{e} DLM contained 90 S35s and some 140 H35s alone.

The French 7th Army was assigned to protect the northernmost part of the Allied front. It contained the 1st Light Mechanized Division (1^{re} DLM), the 25th Motorised Infantry Division (25^{e} Division d'Infanterie Motorisée, or 25^{e} DIM) and the 9th Motorised Infantry Division (9^{e} DIM). This force would advance to Breda in the Netherlands.

The third French army to see action on Belgian soil was the 9th. It was weaker than both the 7th and the 1st Armies. The 9th Army was allocated infantry divisions, with the exception of the 5th Motorised Infantry Division (5^{e} DIM). Its mission was to protect the southern flank of the Allied armies, south of the Sambre river and just north of Sedan. Further south, in France, was the French 2nd Army, protecting the Franco-Belgian border between Sedan and Montmédy. The two weakest French armies were thus protecting the area of the main German thrust.

Ultimately, France's involvement in Belgium proved unable to repel the German attack, and both nations were defeated when the Wehrmacht launched Fall Gelb.

=== Post-World War II ===
Belgium and France were both founding members of NATO in 1949 and the European Economic Community, which later evolved into the European Union, in 1957. Since then, the countries have been close allies.

== Diaspora ==
In the 1850s, Belgians made up one third of the foreign nationals living in France. As of 2013, there were 133,066 registered Belgians living in France.

== Diplomatic visits ==
In May 2007, French President Nicolas Sarkozy visited Belgian Prime Minister Guy Verhofstadt.

In February 2008, Prime Minister Verhofstadt visited President Sarkozy.

In February 2014, King Philippe and Queen Mathilde visited Paris, where they were welcomed during a visite de Courtoisie. They were received by the President François Hollande.

== Economic cooperation ==
In 2007, French president Sarkozy and Belgian Prime Minister Verhofstadt called for the euro zone to have an economic government.

In September 2008, the French government acted with the Belgian government and with other stakeholders to grant Franco-Belgian bank Dexia a €6.4 billion bailout.

== Agreements ==
The two countries signed a trade agreement in 1934.

In 1997, French and Belgian defence ministers Alain Richard and Jean-Paul Poncelet signed an agreement providing for Belgium's use of the French armed forces' Syracuse communication satellite system.

== Resident diplomatic missions ==
- Belgium has an embassy in Paris and a consulate-general in Marseille.
- France has an embassy and consulate-general in Brussels.

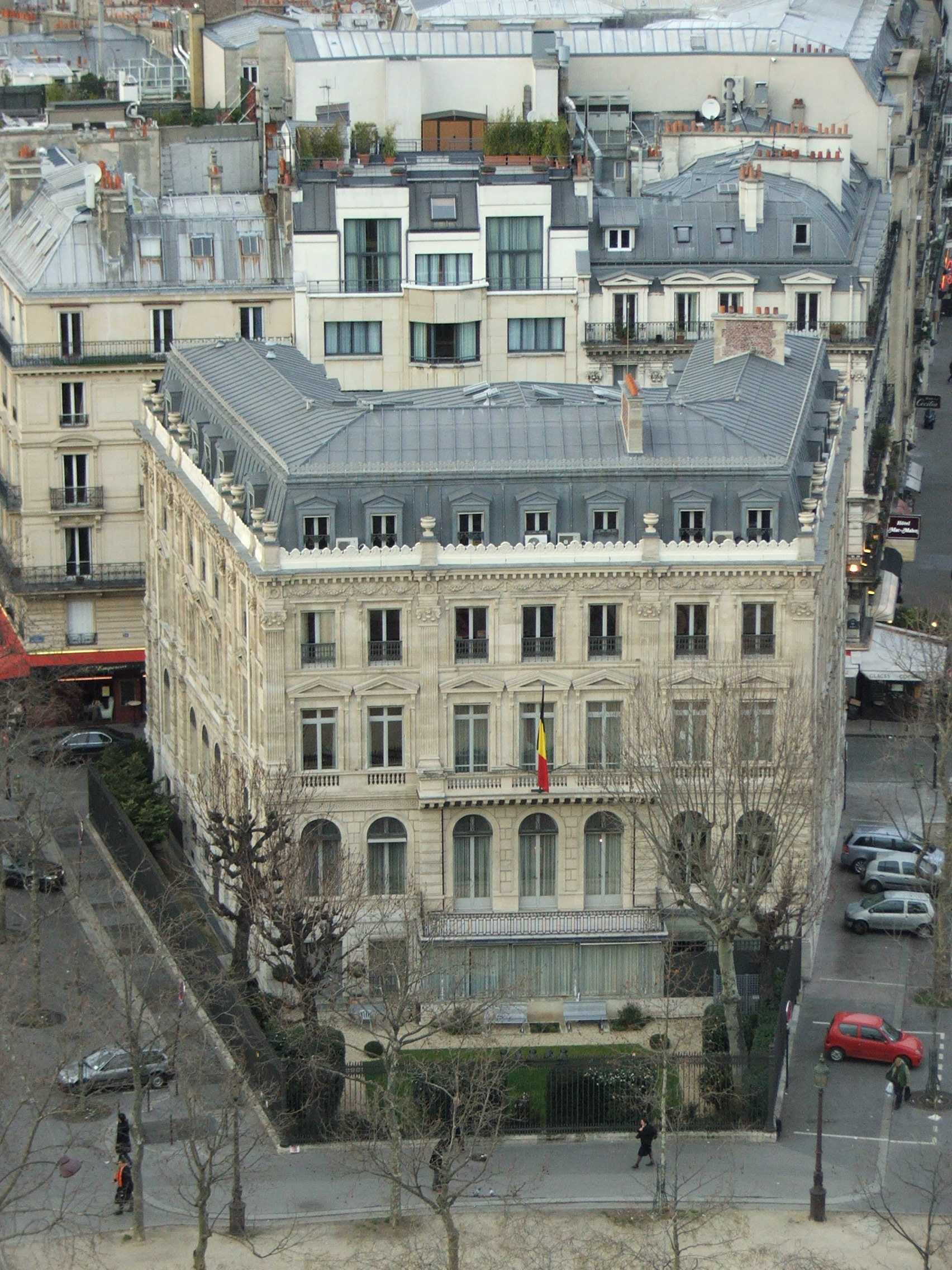
Embassy of Belgium in Paris

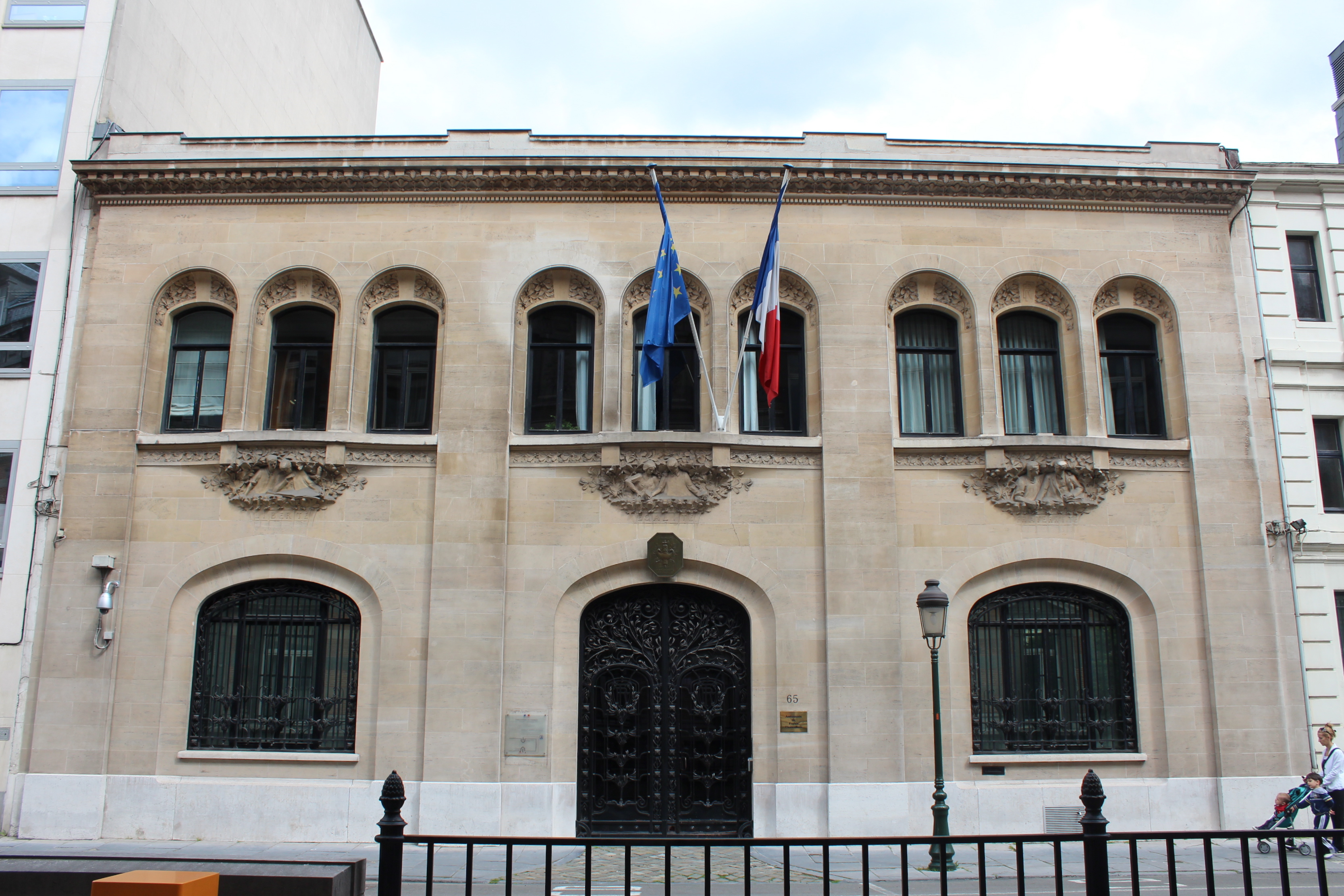
Embassy of France in Brussels

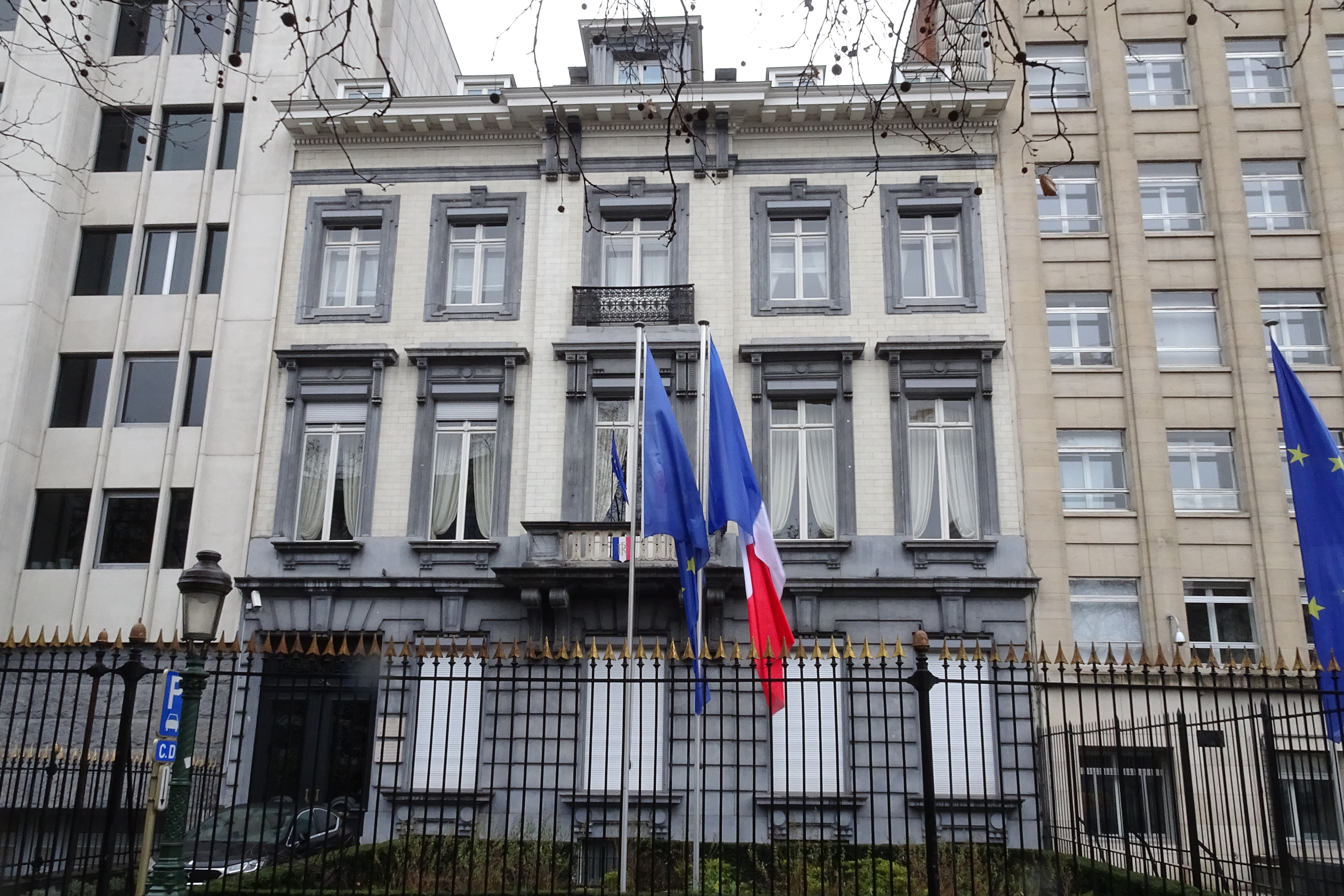
Consulate-General of France in Brussels

== See also ==
- Foreign relations of Belgium
- Foreign relations of France
- List of Ambassadors of France to Belgium
- Belgium–France border
- Franco-Belgian comics

== Sources ==
- Bond, Brian (1990), Britain, France, and Belgium, 1939–1940, London: Brassey's (UK) Riverside, N.J, ISBN 978-0-08-037700-1
- Bond, Brian; Taylor, Michael (2001), The Battle of France and Flanders 1940, London: Leo Cooper, ISBN 978-0-85052-811-4
- Healy, Mark (2008), Prigent, John (ed.), Panzerwaffe: The Campaigns in the West 1940, vol. 1, Shepperton: Ian Allan, ISBN 978-0-7110-3240-8
