= List of ambassadors of France to Belgium =

The following is a list of ambassadors of France to Belgium. It also includes top-ranking French diplomats in Belgium who did not formally have the ambassador title.

The three main sources used to build the list are the website of the French Embassy in Brussels, a more formal list of French ambassadors post-World War II compiled by the French Ministry of Foreign Affairs, and two more detailed lists of high-ranking diplomats which only cover parts of the 19th century. Additional references are provided below for specific individuals.

Start of term (Note: Sources typically do not explain what they consider as the start of term of the diplomat (day on which the diplomat was named, took office, presented his Letter of credence and so on). This can explain some of the slight discrepancies of dates from one list to another.)	End of term	Ambassador (or diplomat of highest rank (Note: Unless otherwise noted, individuals in this list from 1831 to 1906 had the title of Minister Plenipotentiary or (equivalently) Envoy Extraordinary and Minister Plenipotentiary. Starting in 1909 they hold the title of Ambassador.))
1830	1831	Charles Joseph, comte Bresson (special envoy)
1831	1832	Augustin Daniel Belliard
1832	1832	Auguste de Tallenay (chargé d'affaires and interim head of mission following the death of Belliard)
1832	1836	Charles Armand Septime de Faÿ de La Tour-Maubourg (Note: Son of Charles César de Fay de La Tour-Maubourg.)
1836	1840	Louis Sérurier
1840	1848	Marie-Hippolyte de Gueulluy, 2nd Marquess of Rumigny (ambassador)
1848	1848	Louis Sérurier (chargé d'affaires)
1848	1848	Mr. Bellocq
1848	1852	Théodore Quinette
1852	1852	Charles Adrien His, Comte de Butenval
1852	1853	Napoléon Maret, Duc de Bassano
1853	1858	Adolphe Barrot
1858	1860	Comte Gustave de Monttessuy
1860	1862	Baron de Talleyrand
1862	1863	Baron de Malaret
1863	1864	Théophile de Ferrière-le-Vayer
1864	1868	Comte de Comminges-Guitaut
1868	1870	Louis Étienne Arthur Dubreuil, vicomte de La Guéronnière
1870	1870	Jules Berthémy (never took office)
1870	1870	Paul de Laboulaye (chargé d'affaires)
1870	1871	Albert Tachard
1871	1873	Ernest Picard
1873	1876	Georges-Napoléon Baude
1876	1878	Joseph de Cadoine, Marquis de Gabriac
1878	1880	Tanneguy Duchâtel
1880	1882	Albert Decrais
1882	1886	Gustave Lannes, Comte de Montebello
1886	1894	Albert Bourée
1894	1897	Charles Jean Tristan de Montholon
1897	1906	Auguste Gérard
1906	1909	Olivier Le Fèvre Comte d’Ormesson
1909	1911	Paul Beau
1911	1918	Antony Wladislas Klobukowski
1918	1919	Albert Defrance
1919	1922	Pierre de Margerie
1922	1929	Maurice Herbette
1929	1931	Emmanuel de Peretti de la Rocca
1931	1933	Charles Corbin
1933	1935	Paul Claudel
1935	1937	Jules Laroche
1937	1940	Paul Bargeton
1942	1944	Jean-Claude Paris (representative of the Comité national français)
1944	1947	Raymond Brugère
1947	1952	Jean de Hauteclocque
1952	1956	Jean Rivière
1956	1962	Raymond Bousquet
1962	1963	Francis Lacoste
1963	1965	Henry Spitzmuller
1965	1970	Étienne de Crouy-Chanel
1970	1973	Gontran Begougne de Juniac
1973	1980	Francis Hure
1980	1983	Roger Vaurs
1983	1986	Jacques Thibau
1986	1986	Jean Audibert
1986	1988	Jacques Lecompt
1988	1991	Xavier Marie du Cauzé de Nazelle
1991	1993	Alain Pierret
1993	1998	Jacques Bernière
1998	2002	Jacques Rummelhardt
2003	2007	Joëlle Bourgois
2007	2009	Dominique Boché
2009	2012	Michèle Boccoz
2012	2015	Bernard Valero
2015	2019	Claude-France Arnould
2019	2021	Hélène Farnaud-Defromont
2021	Incumbent	François Sénémaud

== See also ==
- Belgium–France relations
