= Aimé-Joseph de Fleuriau =

French diplomat (1870–1938)

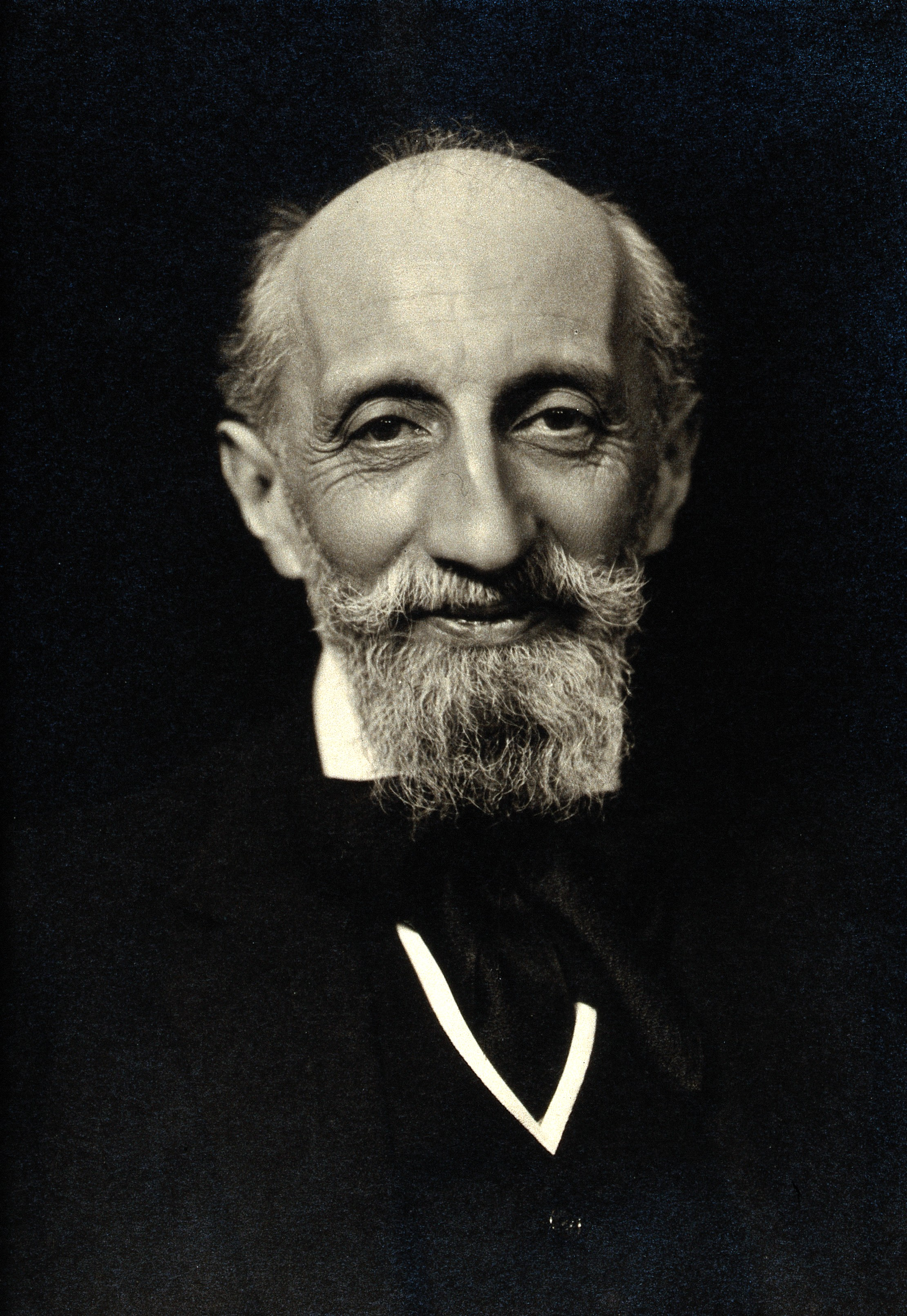
Portrait. Credit: Wellcome Library

De Fleuriau arms

Aimé-Joseph de Fleuriau (1870 - 1938) was a French diplomat who served as Ambassador to London from 1924 until 1933.

== Honours ==
- - Grand officier, Légion d'Honneur
- - Hon. GCB
- - Hon. GCVO
