= Orme Sargent =

British diplomat and civil servant

Sir Harold Orme Garton Sargent GCMG KCB (31 October 1884 – 23 October 1962) was a British diplomat and civil servant.

== Early life and career ==
Sargent was born Giles Orme Sargent; his parents changed his name after they registered his birth. He was educated at Radley College, then in Switzerland, and prepared for the Diplomatic Service. He entered the Foreign Office in 1906.

== Diplomat ==
Sargent was at the British legation in Bern from 1917 to 1919 when he was posted to Paris with the British delegation to the Paris Peace Conference. "[The ambassadors'] discussions ranged over all the problems of Europe, and gave Sargent a memorable introduction to many of the new influences, hopes and fears occasioned by the disintegration of pre-1914 Europe." He remained in Paris until 1925, when he returned to London and thereafter refused to go abroad again. In 1926, with the rank of counsellor, he was made head of the Foreign Office's Central Department, which covered Italy, Austria, Hungary, Yugoslavia, and the Balkans. When he was promoted to assistant Under-Secretary in 1933 his scope widened to include France, Germany and Poland. "He never had doubts about the significance of Hitler's rise to power in 1933, and he took every opportunity that came his way of emphasizing the reality of the menace. It was no surprise to his colleagues that the public rejoicings over Munich should provoke him to say, 'Anybody would think that we were celebrating a major victory instead of the betrayal of a minor ally.'"

=== Second World War ===
During the Second World War, Sargent was deputy under-secretary, taking charge of the Foreign Office when the Permanent Under-Secretary (head of the Foreign Office), Sir Alexander Cadogan, was away travelling with Anthony Eden, the Foreign Secretary, or Winston Churchill, the Prime Minister. After the war, Sargent succeeded Cadogan as Permanent Under-Secretary in 1946. He retired in 1949.

=== Postwar ===
Sargent was determined to maintain Britain's status as a world power although it had been economically weakened after the Second World War. In a memorandum issued in August 1945, he wrote, "a feeling that Great Britain is now a secondary Power and can be treated as such... [is a] misconception which it must be our policy to combat".

In retirement Sargent lived in Bath. He was a connoisseur of art and furniture and became chairman of the Holburne of Menstrie Museum in Bath. He bequeathed his art collection to the museum.

Government offices
| Preceded by Sir Alexander Cadogan | Permanent Under-Secretary for Foreign Affairs; 1946–1949 | Succeeded by Sir William Strang |
