= Émile Boutmy =

French political scientist and sociologist

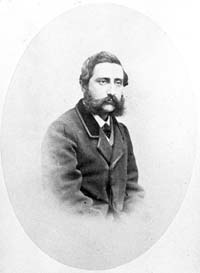
Émile Boutmy (1835–1906)

Émile Boutmy (13 April 1835 – 25 January 1906) was a French political scientist and sociologist who was a native of Paris.

He studied law in Paris, and from 1867 to 1870 gave lectures on the history and culture of civilizations as it pertained to architecture at the École Spéciale d'Architecture. Being shocked by the ignorance and disinterest in regards to political issues that he observed during the Paris Commune, he founded in 1872 the Ecole Libre des Sciences Politiques with important industrialists and academics that included Hippolyte Taine, Ernest Renan, Albert Sorel and Pierre Paul Leroy-Beaulieu.

From 1873 to 1890, Boutmy gave classes on the constitutional history of England, France and the United States. In 1879 he was appointed to the Académie des Sciences Morales et Politiques. Today the main auditorium of the Institut d'Etudes Politiques de Paris (Sciences Po) is named in his honor.

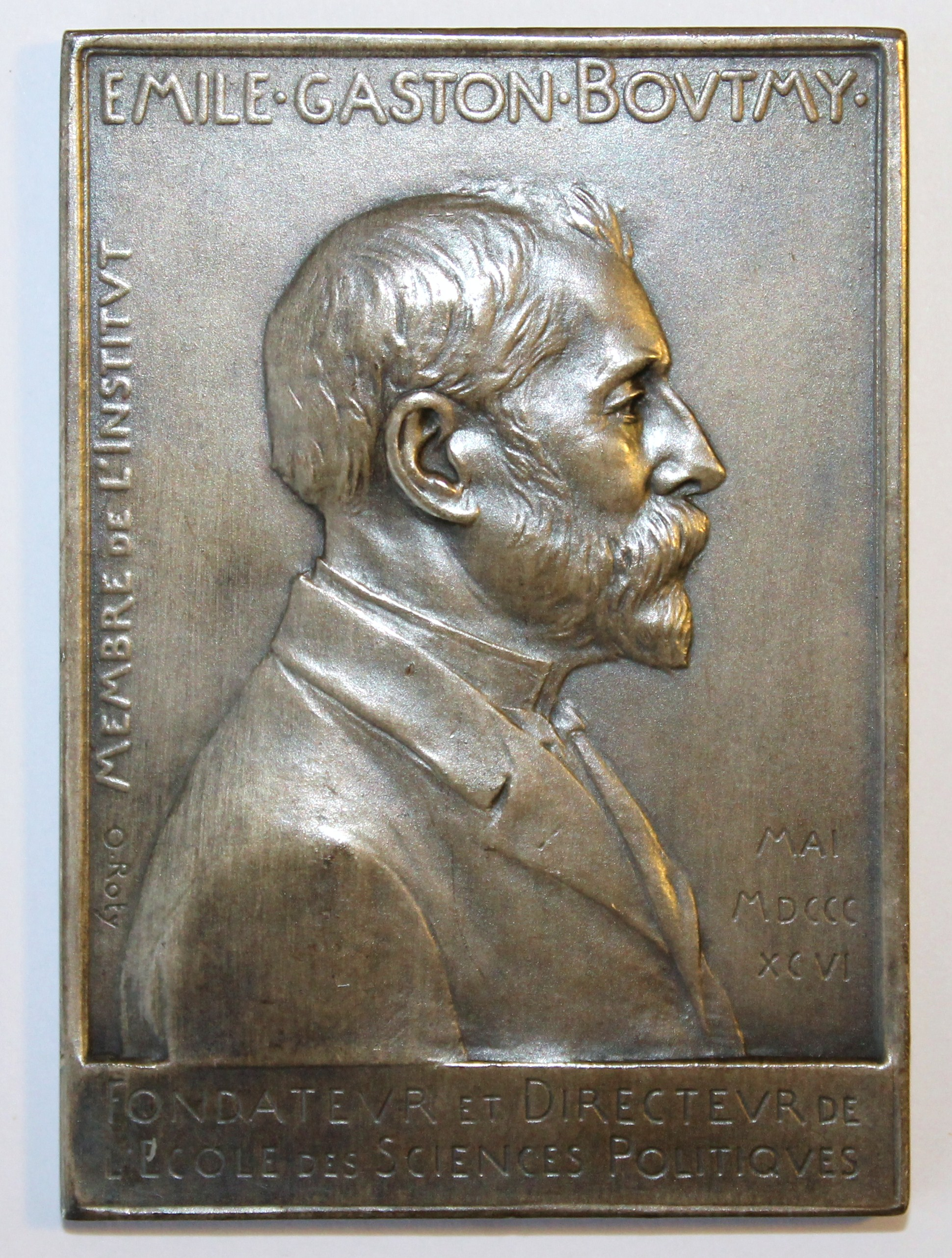
Émile Boutmy by Louis-Oscar Roty

== Selected writings ==
- Philosophie de l'architecture en Grèce (Philosophy of architecture in Greece), 1870
- Quelques Observations sur la réforme de l'enseignement supérieur (Some observations on the reform of higher education), 1876
- Etudes de droit constitutionnel (Studies of constitutional law), 1888
- Le recrutement des administrateurs coloniaux (The recruitment of colonial administrators), 1895
- Essai d'une psychologie politique du peuple anglais au XIXe siècle (Essay on the political psychology of the people in 19th century England), 1901
- Le Parthénon et le génie grec (The Parthenon and Greek engineering), 1901
- Etudes politiques : La souveraineté du peuple, la Déclaration des droits de l'homme (Political studies: The sovereignty of the people, the declaration of human rights), 1907
- Eléments d'une psychologie politique du peuple américain (Elements of the political psychology of the American people), 1911
