= Sciences Po =

Higher-education institution in Paris

Paris Institute of Political Studies
- Institut d'études politiques de Paris (French)
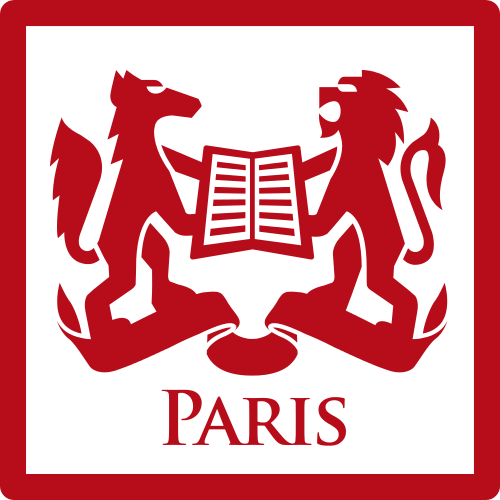
- Other name: Sciences Po
- Former name: École libre des sciences politiques
- Motto: French: Aux racines de l'avenir
- Motto in English: At the roots of the future
- Type: Public research university Grande école Grand établissement Institut d'études politiques
- Established: 1872; 154 years ago
- Founder: Émile Boutmy
- Affiliations: CIVICA; Sorbonne Paris Cité; APSIA; COUPERIN; CGE
- Endowment: €127.2 million (2018)
- Budget: €197 million (2018)
- Chairperson: Laurence Bertrand Dorléac (FNSP)
- President: Luis Vassy
- Provost: Sergei Guriev
- Academic staff: 300
- Students: 15,000
- Undergraduates: 4,000
- Postgraduates: 10,000
- Doctoral students: 350
- Location: Paris, Nancy, Dijon, Poitiers, Menton, Le Havre and Reims, France; 48°51′15″N 2°19′43″E
- Campus: Urban
- Language: French and English (official, university-wide); German (working language at the Nancy campus); Spanish (working language at the Poitiers campus)
- Printing house: Sciences Po Press
- Colours: Red White
- Mascot: The lion and the fox
- Website: sciencespo.fr

Sciences Po (French pronunciation: [sjɑ̃s po]) or Sciences Po Paris, formally known as the Paris Institute of Political Studies (French: Institut d'études politiques de Paris), is a public research university located in Paris, France, which holds the status of grande école and the legal status of grand établissement. The university's undergraduate program is taught on the Paris campus as well as on the decentralized campuses in Dijon, Le Havre, Menton, Nancy, Poitiers and Reims, each with their own academic program focused on a geopolitical part of the world. While Sciences Po historically specialized in political science, it progressively expanded to other social sciences such as economics, law, and sociology.

The school was established in 1872 by Émile Boutmy as the École libre des sciences politiques in the aftermath of the Franco-Prussian War as a private institution to form a new French elite that would be knowledgeable in political science, law, and history. It was a pioneer in the emergence and development of political science as an academic field in France. Following World War II, the school was nationalized and re-established as a public institution. As of 2021, 80% of Sciences Po graduates are employed in the private sector.

Sciences Po Paris is the only Institute of Political Sciences in France allowed to refer to itself with the epithet "Sciences Po" without indicating the name of the city where their headquarters are located, under a legal agreement with the other institutes. They are allowed to use the term "Sciences Po" to refer to themselves only when followed by the names of the cities where they are located, such as "Sciences Po Lille" or "Sciences Po Grenoble."

The institute is a member of the Association of Professional Schools of International Affairs and The European University of Social Sciences.

== History ==
=== 1872 to 1945: Free School of Political Sciences ===
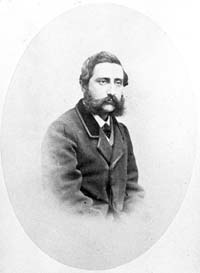
Émile Boutmy, Sciences Po founder

Sciences Po was established in December 1871 (Note: While the school's statutes were registered by a notary in December 1871, the school opened in 1872.) as the École libre des sciences politiques (ELSP) by a group of French intellectuals, politicians and businessmen led by Émile Boutmy, including Hippolyte Taine, Ernest Renan, Albert Sorel and Paul Leroy Beaulieu. The creation of the school was in response to widespread fears that the inadequacy of the education of the French political elite corps would diminish the country's international stature, as France grappled with a series of crises, including its defeat in the 1870 Franco-Prussian War, the demise of Napoleon III's regime, and the upheaval and massacre resulting from the Paris Commune. The founders of the school sought to reform the training of the French political and economic elite by establishing a new "breeding ground where nearly all the major, non-technical state commissioners were trained." His innovative intellectual axis was to teach contemporary history, whereas political elites had only been taught ancient humanities for centuries, which they could still learn in universities at the same time.

The École acquired a major role in France's political system. From 1901 to 1935, 92.5% of entrants to the Grands corps de l'État, the most powerful and prestigious administrative bodies in the French Civil Service, had studied there (this figure includes people who took civil service examination preparatory classes at Sciences Po but did not earn a degree and, in general, students were taking classes there on top of earning a degree at the University of Paris, in particular the Law Faculty).

Other countries created similar schools in the following century. In 1875, the Istituto Cesare Alfieri in Italy (now part of the University of Florence), at the end of the century, the École libre des sciences Politiques et Sociales in Belgium (not existing any more), the Deutsche Hochschule für Politik in Germany, the Columbia School of Political Science (now merged into the Columbia Graduate School of Arts and Sciences), the London School of Economics in the United Kingdom, and, after WW1, for the School of Foreign Service from Georgetown University in the United States and the Geneva Graduate Institute in Switzerland.

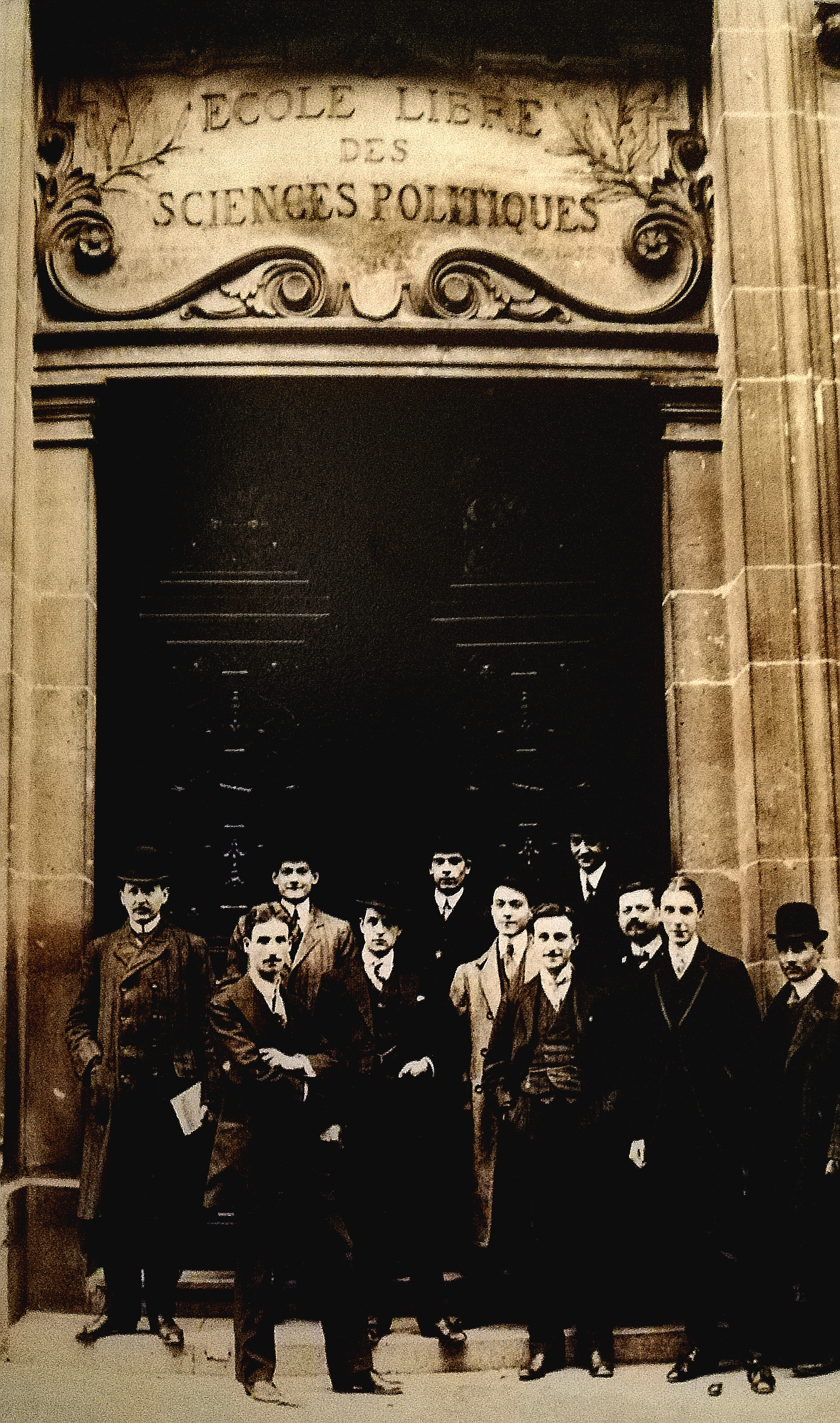
Students and staff in front of the original entrance in the 1910s

The connection between Sciences Po and French institutions meant that the school also played a key role in the apparatus of the French colonial empires. In 1886, the university established a colonial studies program with the goal of training students to take on professions in the colonial administration in a way that "propagates [...] a more scientific and international colonialism". Many professors and members of the ELSP administration, such as Paul Leroy-Beaulieu, chair in colonial affairs at ELSP, Joseph Chailley-Bert, Jules Cambon, Charles Jonnart, Auguste Louis Albéric d’Arenberg and Ernest Roume, were also closely linked to or worked directly with the colonial government. The colonial branch of ELSP closed in 1893 after a state-sponsored Colonial School was created in 1889; however positions in the administrations of French colonies and protectorates continued to accept graduates from the ELSP.

=== 1945: Refoundation ===
Sciences Po underwent significant reforms in the aftermath of World War II in 1945. At France's liberation from Nazi occupation, the public servants were accused of collaborating with the Vichy regime and Nazi Germany. Communist politicians including Georges Cogniot accused the school to be the "home of collaboration" with Nazi Germany and proposed abolishing the ELSP entirely and founding a new state-run administration college on its premises. The school, however, had also trained eight out of the thirteen ministers of the Provisional Government of the French Republic, and several prominent members of the French Resistance. In order for the school not to be replaced, the director Roger Seydoux, his aid Jacques Chapsal and the school's most famous professor, André Siegfried, excluded those among the school's staff who were most compromised with the Vichy regime and Nazi Germany, and defended the school against accusation of collaboration and built up a communication campaign to save the school.

The choice regarding the future of the school would be made by France's Provisional Government, under Charles de Gaulle. The alumni Michel Debré, Jules Jeanneney and Roger Grégoire decided that the school would be preserved but transformed in a new structure. Two separate legal entities were created: the Institut d'études politiques (English: Institute of political studies) and the Fondation Nationale des Sciences Politiques (English: National Foundation of Political Science) or FNSP. Both were tasked by the French government to ensure "the progress and the spread, both within and outside France, of political science, economics, and sociology". The FNSP, a private foundation, manages the IEP de Paris, owns its buildings and libraries, and determines its budget. The two entities work together in lockstep, however, as the director of the school is, by tradition, also the administrator of FNSP. This institutional arrangement gives Sciences Po a unique status, as the school draws most of its resources through substantial government subsidies to FNSP, but does not subject it to many government interventions and regulations, giving it a much higher level of autonomy compared to other French universities and schools. The epithet Sciences Po is applied to both entities, which inherited the reputation previously vested in ELSP.

The public-private nature of Sciences Po, Paris, also distinguishes it from a network of institutes of political studies throughout the country that were inspired by its curriculum, namely in Strasbourg, Lyon, Aix, Bordeaux, Grenoble, Toulouse, Rennes and Lille. They are not to be confused with the seven campuses of Sciences Po in France.

The government also established in 1945 the École Nationale d'Administration (ENA), an elite postgraduate school for training government officials. From then on, the Grands Corps de l'Etat were obliged to recruit new entrants from ENA. Sciences Po became the school of choice for those hoping to enter the ENA, and so retained its dominant place in educating high-ranking officials.

=== 1945 to 1996: The Chapsal-Gentot-Lancelot era ===
From 1947 to 1979, Sciences Po is directed by Jacques Chapsal, who replaced his mentor Roger Seydoux and led the school through the Trente Glorieuses expansion as well as the May 68 crisis. Under Chapsal, Sciences Po expands geographically. After the acquisition of the Hôtel de La Meilleraye (56–58, rue des Saints-Pères), just across Sciences Po's lawn, the school bought the hôtel de La Bretesche at number 30, rue Saint-Guillaume, just in front of the main building. In 1976, the Presses de Sciences Po (Sciences Po's publishing company) is created.

In 1956, Sciences Po created its first PhD program. The CEVIPOF, Center for Political Research, is created in 1960.

Between 1952 and 1969, 77.5% of the ENA's graduate student intake were Sciences Po alumni.

FNSP received a significant donations from the Rockefeller Foundation. FNSP published periodicals such as la Revue française de science politique, le Bulletin analytique de documentation, la Chronologie politique africaine, and the Cahiers de la Fondation as well as its seven research centres and main publishing house, Presses de Sciences Po.

=== 1996 to 2012: The Descoings era ===
Political science professor Alain Lancelot led the school between 1987 and 1997. He prepared for the school's vice-director, Richard Descoings, to become the director of Sciences Po. Under the directorship of Descoings, the school incorporated courses in various branches of the social sciences on top of political science, such as law, economics, history, and sociology. The school also began requiring all its undergraduate students to spend a year abroad, and introduced a multilingual curriculum in French, English, and other languages. Sciences Po also began to expand outside Paris, establishing regional campuses throughout France.

During this period, Sciences Po implemented reforms in its admissions process. Previously, Sciences Po recruited its students exclusively on the basis of a competitive examination. This system was seen to favor students from prestigious high schools. In 2001, Sciences Po founded the Equal Opportunity Program, widening its admissions policy. This program enables the institution to recruit high-potential students at partner high schools in more disadvantaged parts of France who, due to a social, academic, and financial constraints, would not otherwise have been able to attend Sciences Po. As a consequence, from 2001 to 2011, the proportion of scholarship students at Sciences Po went from 6 to 27 percent with around 30% of all students at Sciences Po currently receiving some form of scholarship.

The reforms Descoings spearheaded were at times controversial and his leadership style came under heavy criticism. A further report by the French Court of Audit in 2012 severely criticized the financial management of the bonuses and salaries under Descoings.

=== 2013 to 2024: The Mion-Vicherat directorate ===
After the sudden death of Richard Descoing, Frédéric Mion, was appointed director of Sciences Po on 1 March 2013. Mion's intention to pursue Sciences Po's development as a "selective university of international standing" is detailed in the policy paper "Sciences Po 2022", published in the spring of 2014. He restructured the graduate studies by creating graduate schools, leading to the creation of the School of Public Affairs and the Urban School in 2015 and the School of Management and Innovation in 2016.

In early 2016, Sciences Po updated its governance structure, adopting new statutes for its two constituent bodies: the Fondation nationale des sciences politiques (FNSP) and the Institut d'études politiques de Paris (IEP).

In late 2016, Sciences Po acquired a new site, the Hôtel de l'Artillerie in the 7th arrondissement of Paris to expand its campus.

In 2021, Sciences Po was hit by the Duhamel scandal, mainly put forward by the best-seller book La Familia Grande and newspaper articles from Le Monde and Nouvel Obs, a sexual violence scandal one and a succession crisis. Olivier Duhamel, director of the National Foundation of Sciences Po, who was accused of raping his son, resigned. Frédéric Mion and other members of the board of these institutions resigned.

On 22 November 2021, Mathias Vicherat assumed office as the new director of Sciences Po. He resigned on March 13, 2024, after being ordered to stand trial on charges of domestic abuse. On March 26, Jean Bassères was named interim director.

In April 2024, Sciences Po became one of the epicenters of French student protests against the Gaza war.

On 28 September 2024, Luis Vassy assumed office as the new director of Sciences Po.

== Campuses ==
Sciences Po has seven campuses in France, with each specialising in different regions of the globe. Every May, at the end of the academic year, all seven campuses come together for the inter-campus Collégiades de Sciences Po tournament, also known as the MiniCrit. At the tournament, students represent each campus and compete against one another in arts and athletic competitions. Different events include athletic games such as volleyball and football, as well as artistic competitions such as music and dance.

=== Paris ===
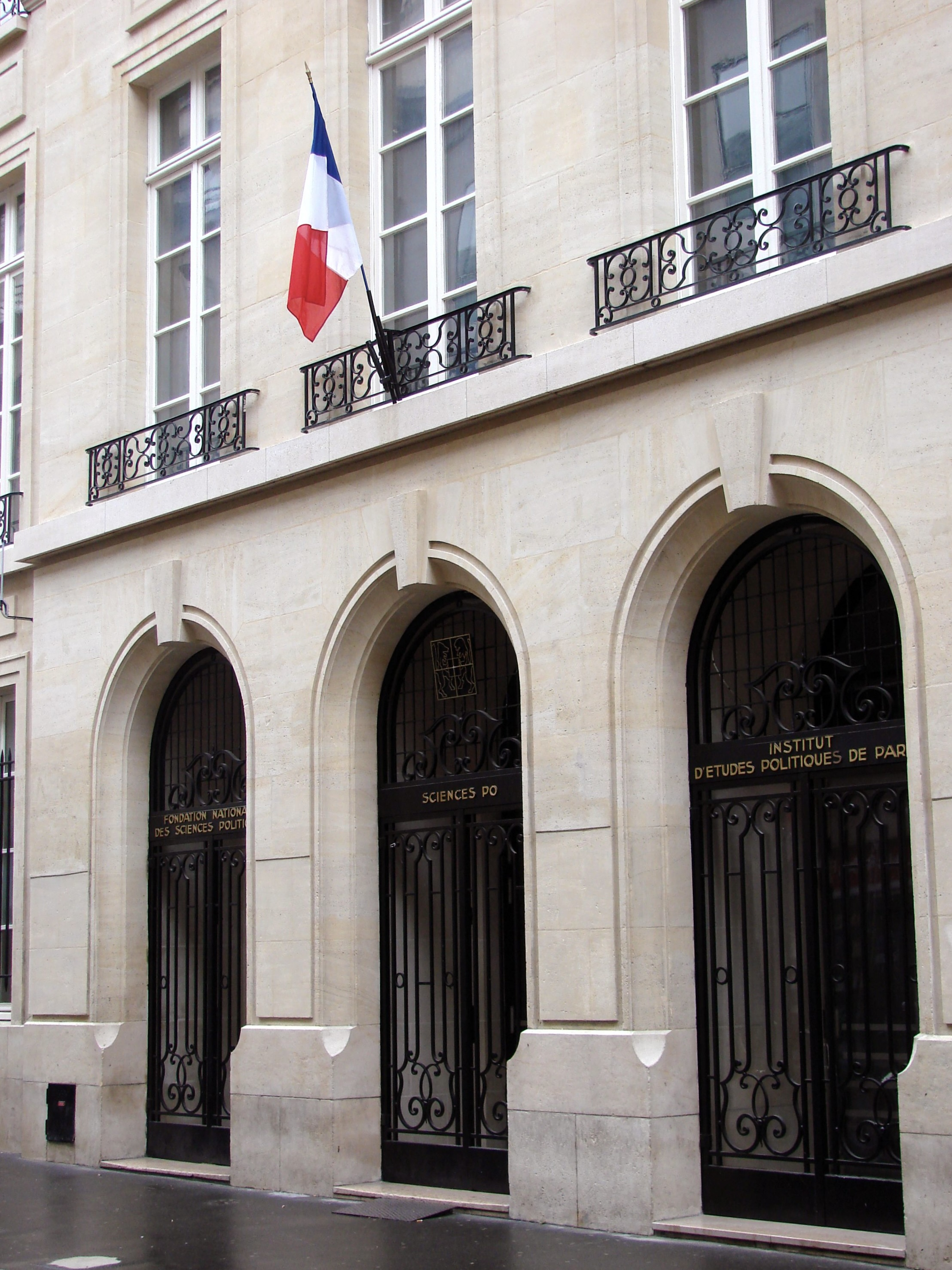
The entrance to Sciences Po on Rue Saint-Guillaume

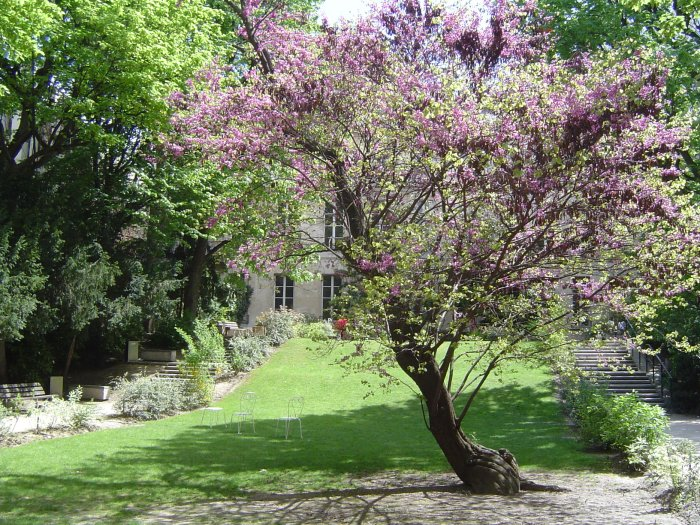
Sciences Po garden, between Rue Saint-Guillaume and Rue des Saints-Pères

The Paris campus is spread across several buildings concentrated around the Boulevard Saint-Germain in the 6th and 7th arrondissements. The historic centre of Sciences Po at 27 rue Saint-Guillaume houses the head office, classrooms and the central library since 1879; it is located in a hôtel particulier called Hôtel de Mortemart. It is also home to Sciences Po's two largest teaching halls, the Amphitheatres Émile Boutmy and Jacques Chapsal. Other buildings include:

- 1, place Saint Thomas d'Aquin: School of Journalism, Research Center for History (Centre d'histoire de Sciences Po), International Relations (Centre d'études et de recherches internationales), and School of Urban studies
- 199, boulevard Saint-Germain: Doctoral School, Language Lab
- 174 and 224, boulevard Saint-Germain: offices and classrooms
- 13, rue de l'Université / The René Rémond building: Law School, administrative offices, audiovisual service, and Paris School of International Affairs (PSIA)
- 56, rue des Saints-Pères: cartography workshop.

The Paris campus enrolls about 3,000 undergraduate students, almost a third of whom are international exchange students.

Sciences Po purchased in 2016 the Hôtel de l’Artillerie, a 17th-century former monastery of 14,000 m^{2} located 200 meters from its campus on rue Saint-Guillaume, from the French Ministry of Defense and refurbished the building for a total cost of around 200 million euros. The new facility which opened in 2022, hosts 7 graduate schools including School of Public Affairs, Paris School of International Affairs, Law School, Urban School, School of Management and Impact, Journalism School and the School of Research. It is home to the scientific department and the institute of innovation as well as the Sciences Po's Center for Entrepreneurship. It will provide social housing for 50 to 100 students with need-based aid from the State.

=== Dijon ===
Located in the region of Burgundy in a 19th-century building, the Dijon campus was created in 2001. The regional specialisation is on the European Union, specifically Central and Eastern Europe, and is taught in French. The elective languages offered are Hungarian, Polish, Romanian, Russian and Czech.

=== Le Havre ===
Located on the coast of Normandy, Le Havre has hosted the undergraduate Euro-Asian Programme (taught in English) since 2007. The elective languages offered are Chinese, Japanese and Korean, and French as a Foreign Language courses for students without a B1-equivalent level. Students primarily choose to spend their third year abroad in an Asian country.

=== Menton ===
Established in the French Riviera city of Menton in 2005, the campus is located in an entirely renovated 19th-century building overlooking the Mediterranean. According to the Sciences Po brochure, the Menton Campus' regional specialisation is on the Middle Eastern and the Mediterranean, and it welcomes 300 students each year. The undergraduate programme is taught through two language tracks (French or English) and several elective languages are offered: Arabic, Turkish, Italian, Spanish, Persian, Hebrew, and French as a Foreign Language for those without a CEFR B1-equivalent level in French. The third mandatory year abroad is spent in the Middle East or elsewhere.

=== Nancy ===
Established in the region of Lorraine in 2000, the Nancy campus is located in an 18th-century heritage site, the Hôtel des Missions Royales. The curriculum is taught in French, English and German, as its regional specialisation focuses on the European Union and French-German relations. The elective languages offered are German, English, French as a foreign language and also Italian, Spanish, Russian or Swedish.

=== Poitiers ===
Opened in 2010, the campus is located in the heart of the historic city of Poitiers in the Hôtel Chaboureau, a renovated building dating from the 15th century. The regional specialisation is on Latin America and the Iberian Peninsula. The undergraduate programme is conducted mainly in French, with some courses in English and Spanish. The elective languages offered are Spanish and Portuguese.

=== Reims ===
The Reims campus opened in September 2010. It is housed in the 17th century College des Jesuits. Despite being the most recent campus, it is the largest of the regional campuses of Sciences Po, with over 1,600 undergraduates. Over half of their students are international. The campus offers two regional specialisations, one on North America (taught in English) and the other on Africa (taught in French). Additionally, through a partnership with the University of Reims Champagne-Ardenne (URCA), the Reims Campus offers a dual degree in social sciences & humanities and life sciences entitled "Environment, Society, Sustainability." The elective languages offered are English, Spanish, German, Italian or Arabic, and French as a foreign language for students who do not have a B1 level of French.

== Organisation ==
=== Governance ===
Sciences Po operates under a dual governance model composed of two entities: the Fondation nationale des sciences politiques (FNSP), a private non-profit foundation, and the Institut d’études politiques de Paris or Paris Institute of Political Studies, a public higher education institution. These two bodies constitute Sciences Po, which is the official term used to designate them collectively.

The FNSP is responsible for the strategic direction and administrative and financial management of Sciences Po. It is administered by a board of directors.

The role of the Paris Institute of Political Studies is to ensure teaching, research and library services, like all international research universities. Its governing bodies consist of the Board of Directors, the Student Life and Education Committee and the Academic Board.

The executive committee is the institution's operational steering committee. It brings together the directors of Sciences Po's various divisions and offices under the authority of the President of Sciences Po. The executive committee implements the strategic direction and makes operational decisions on running and managing the institution.

=== Finances ===
Sciences Po's own resources have grown significantly. They have been multiplied by six: from €18.3 million in 2000 to €127.2 million in 2018. These resources now account for a majority of the budget.

The school's development under Richard Descoings led it to contract a €68 million debt by 2010. The institution took on a debt of €191 million in 2016 in order to fund the acquisition of its new Paris campus and undertake the restoration of the site. This debt is partially guaranteed by the Paris City Council.

== Education ==
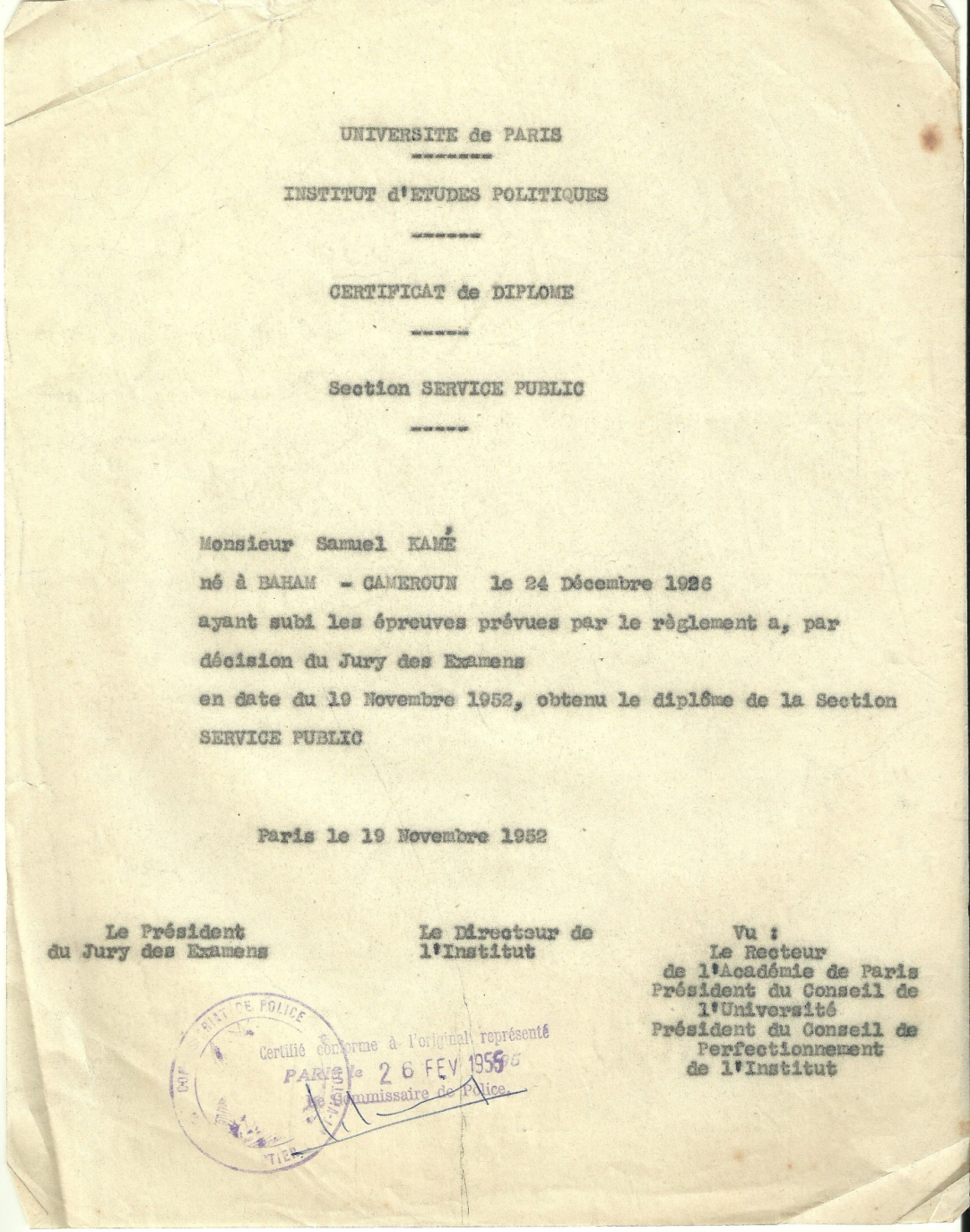
Diploma certificate from Sciences Po Paris (1952)

The academic bodies of Sciences Po consist of the Undergraduate College, six professional schools, and the Doctoral School.

=== Undergraduate level ===
The Sciences Po Undergraduate College offers a three-year Bachelor of Arts degree with a multidisciplinary foundation in the humanities and social sciences with emphasis on civic, linguistic, artistic, and digital training.

In the first year, students take foundational courses in six disciplines - economics, history, humanities, law, political science, and sociology. In the second year, students choose a multidisciplinary major – Politics & Government, Economics & Societies, or Political Humanities. The third year is spent abroad on an exchange programme with a partner university. In addition, each campus offers a different regional specialisation which anchors students' intellectual objectives, the regions are: Africa, Asia, Europe, Latin America, Middle East-Mediterranean, and North America.

Sciences Po offers dual bachelor's degrees with Columbia University, Keio University, University College London, Freie Universität Berlin, University of British Columbia, the University of Sydney, the National University of Singapore, the University of Hong Kong, and the University of California, Berkeley.

The current dean of the Undergraduate College is Jeanne Lazarus.

In 2021, 15,284 students applied to the Undergraduate College across all three admissions pathways (the exam procedure, the Equal Opportunity Programme, and the international procedure). 1,630 students were accepted, for an admission rate of 7%. Sciences Po has an acceptance rate of around 10% on Parcoursup (the national admissions platform for higher education) in 2021.

=== Graduate level ===
At the graduate level, Sciences Po's seven schools offer one- and two-year Master's programmes and PhD programmes. All graduate programmes are delivered on the Sciences Po campus in Paris. Sciences Po also hosts dual Master's programmes with international partners. Students enrolled in these dual degree programmes spend one year at Sciences Po in Paris and one year at the partner university.

=== Schools ===
The Undergraduate College (Collège universitaire) is the home of all undergraduate students. At the graduate level, there are seven professional schools:

- Sciences Po School of Public Affairs (École d'affaires publiques)
- Paris School of International Affairs (École des affaires internationales)
- Sciences Po Law School (École de droit)
- Sciences Po Urban School (École urbaine)
- Sciences Po School of Management and Impact (École du management et de l'impact)
- Sciences Po Journalism School (École de journalisme)
- Paris Climate School
- Sciences Po School of Research (École de la recherche)

The Sciences Po School of Research offers Master and PhD programmes in law, economics, history, political science, or sociology. The PhD programme contains roughly 600 doctoral candidates.

=== Research ===
Research at Sciences Po covers economics, law, history, sociology and political science, while also taking in interdisciplinary topics such as cities, political ecology, sustainable development, socio-economics and globalization.

Sciences Po is home to a research community that includes over 200 researchers and 350 PhD candidates. In 2015, 32% of the school's budget was devoted to research. That year, 65% of its research publications were in French, 32% in English and 3% in other languages.

The institute has research centers, seven of which are affiliated with France's National Centre for Scientific Research (CNRS).

- Center for Socio-Political Data (CDSP), which provides scientifically validated data for international survey programs. It also supports training in data collection and analysis.
- Centre for European Studies and Comparative Politics (CEE), which focuses on inter-disciplinary European studies; participation, democracy and government; election analyses; the restructuring of the state and public action.
- Centre for International Studies (CERI), which produces comparative and historical analysis on foreign societies, international relations, and political, social and economic phenomena.
- Centre for Political Research (CEVIPOF), which investigates political attitudes, behaviour and parties, as well as political thought and the history of ideas.
- Centre for History (CHSP), whose research focuses on: arts, knowledge and culture; wars, conflicts and violence; states, institutions and societies; the political and cultural history of contemporary France; from local to global; international history and its levels.
- Centre for the Sociology of Organisations (CSO), which conducts research on the sociology of organisations, sociology of public policy, and economic sociology. It also studies issues related to higher education and research, healthcare, sustainable development, the evolution of firms, and the transformation of the state.
- Center for Studies in Social Change (OSC), which conducts research on topics such as urban, school and gender inequalities, stratification and social mobility, and ethno-racial or social segregation.
- Department of Economics, which investigates areas such as labour markets, international economics, political economy, microeconomics and development.
- Law School, whose research focuses on globalisation, legal cultures and the economics of law. It has also produced work on the theory and history of law, public and private international law and intellectual property.
- Médialab, which studies the way data generated by new information technologies is produced, circulated and exploited.
- The Observatoire Français des Conjonctures Économiques (OFCE), which is both a research centre and an independent economic forecasting body. Its stated mission is to "ensure that the fruits of scientific rigour and academic independence serve the public debate about the economy".

In addition to these research units, the institute has recently established three major research programs – the LIEPP, DIME-SHS and MaxPo.

- The Laboratoire Interdisciplinaire d'Evaluation des Politiques Publiques (LIEPP) analyzes public policy based on qualitative, comparative, and quantitative methods. The laboratory has been selected by an international scientific jury as a "Laboratoire d'Excellence" (Labex) that will be financed for the next ten years by the French government.
- Données Infrastructures et Méthodes d'Enquête en Sciences Humaines et Sociales (DIME-SHS) aims to collect and disseminate data for use in humanities and social sciences research.
- The Max Planck Sciences Po Center on Coping with Instability in Market Societies (known as MaxPo), was founded in 2012 in co-operation with the Max Planck Institute for the Study of Societies (MPIfG). It investigates how individuals, organizations, and nation-states deal with various forms of economic and social instability. It is located at Sciences Po's Paris campus.

=== Library and publishing ===
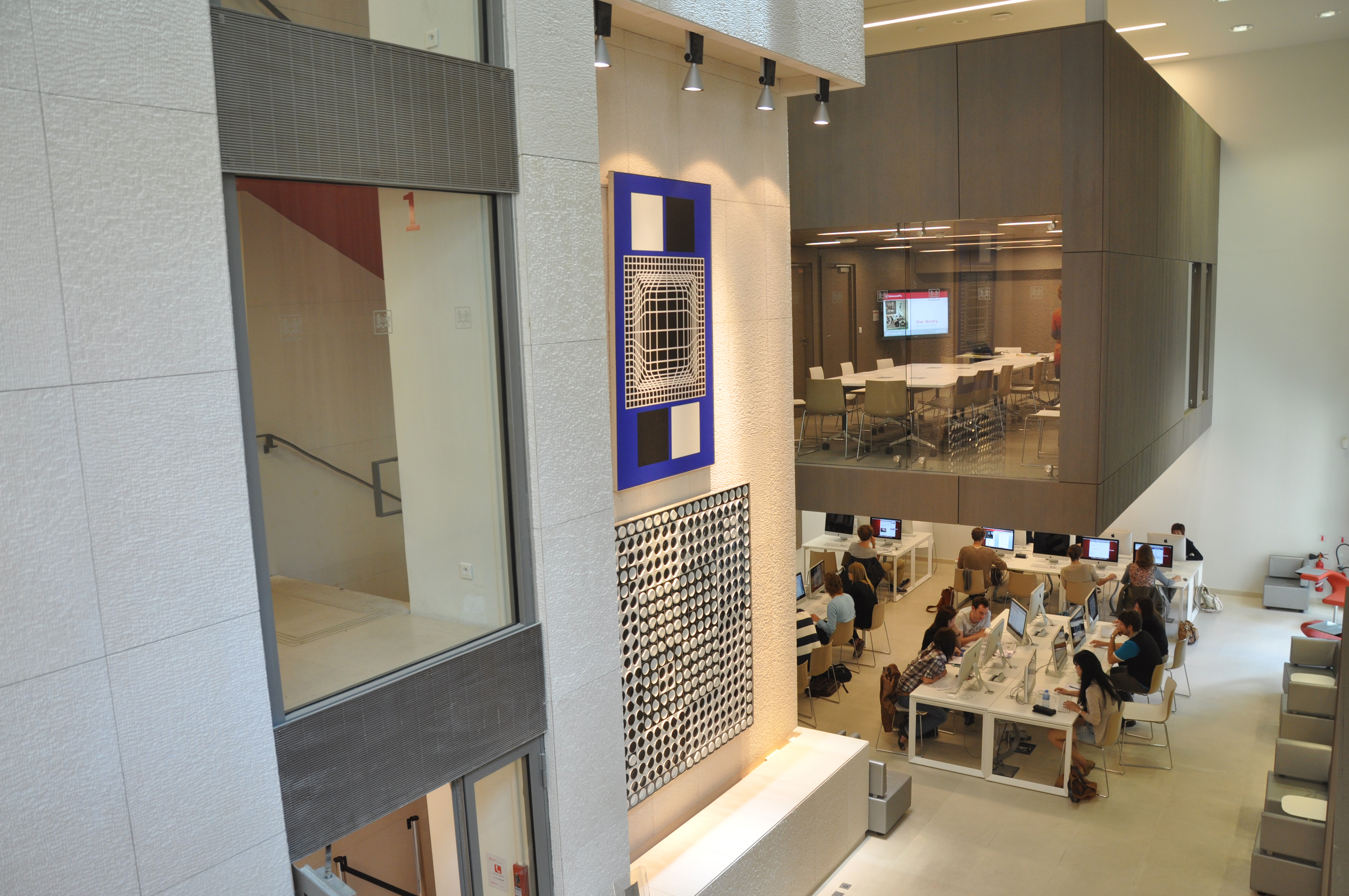
Sciences Po Library

Founded in 1871, the nucleus of the school's research is the Bibliothèque de Sciences Po. The library offers a collection of more than 950,000 titles in the field of social sciences.

In 1982, the Ministry of National Education made the Bibliothèque the Centre for Acquisition and Dissemination of Scientific and Technical Information in the field of political science, and since 1994, it has been the antenna associated with the Bibliothèque Nationale de France. The Bibliothèque de Sciences Po is also the main French partner in the International Bibliography of the Social Sciences, which is based at the London School of Economics.

Founded in the 1950s, Presses de Sciences Po is the publishing house of Sciences Po. It publishes academic works related to the social sciences.

=== Public lectures ===
Sciences Po organizes public lecture events. Recent guest speakers have included Ban Ki-moon, General David Petraeus, Condoleezza Rice, former President of Brazil Luiz Inácio Lula da Silva, Eric Schmidt, Joseph Stiglitz, Sheryl Sandberg, Mario Draghi, UNESCO Director-General Irina Bokova and Harvard University professor Michael Sandel.

Since 2007 it has organized the Franco-British Dialogue Lecture Series in collaboration with the LSE and the French Embassy in London. The lectures are held every term at the LSE's European Institute.

== Reputation and rankings ==
=== National rankings ===
As of 2022, Sciences Po has the highest yield rate of the French Institutes of political studies, as 86% of students who were admitted to its undergraduate programs accepted their offer. In 2022, the admission rate of the school was 10% at the undergraduate level, and 5% on the Paris campus. In 2023, French students who joined the school had scored an average of 17.9/20 at the Baccalauréat. 92% of French students admitted to undergraduate programs got their Baccalauréat Summa cum laude ("mention Très bien").

National rankings place the school in first place in sociology, social policy and administration, in second place in development studies and law, and third place in economics.

=== International rankings ===
In rankings based on English-speaking publications, in 2023, Sciences Po ranks 2nd globally for the study of Politics in the QS World University Subjects Rankings, whereas it is ranked 39th in social sciences by Times Higher Education. In 2024, its global ranking in the QS World University Rankings decreased to the 319th rank.

Rankings: International (national)/Total number of ranked institution
Year	2014	2015	2016	2017	2018	2019	2020	2021	2022	2023
Global and regional rankings
QS - Global ranking	214	222	223	220	220	221	242 (7)	242 (7)	261	259
THE - Global ranking					401–500	401–500	401–500 (19)	501–600 (21)		
By field
QS - Social Sciences & Management	–	–	–	62	67	69	59 (4)	56 (3)		65 (4)
THE - Social Sciences & Management							69 (2)			39 (1)
QS - Arts & Humanities	–	–	–	154	207	176	170 (6)	162 (5)		
THE - Arts & Humanities							-/536 (-/20)			
By subject
QS - Politics	13	5	4	4	4	3	2	2 (1)	3 (1)	3
QS - Social Policy & Administration	–	–	40	51–100	48	22	23	21 (1)		13
QS - Sociology	36	51–100	50	44	37	28	28			27
QS - Development Studies	–	51–100	51–100	–	51–100	51–100	40			51–100
QS - Law & Legal Studies	51–100	51–100	51–100	51–100	51–100	51–100	50			65 (2)
THE - Law							–/190 (–/2)			–/290 (–/6)
Eduniversal - Law (global)							(–/15)			
QS - Economics & Econometrics	101–150	101–150	51–100	101–150	101–150	101–150	51–100			89 (6)
THE - Business & Economics							–/632 (–/20)			
QS - History	–	–	101–150	51–100	51–100	101–150	101–150			
QS - Philosophy	–	–	–	–	–	–	151–200			
QS - Modern Languages	–	151–200	201–250	251–300	201–250	201–250	201–250			
QS - Accounting & Finance	–	–	–	–	–	201–250	201–250			251–300 (10)

=== Reputation and criticism ===
Sciences Po has been called France's "leading university in the social sciences". It is considered to be the most prestigious of all of the IEP (Instituts d'études politiques, or Institutes of Political Studies) in France. Sciences Po is widely regarded to be an elite institution due to its selectivity in admissions and its close connections to powerful networks within French society. It has been described as a "school of power" that has inspired schools abroad, such as the London School of Economics. Because of its role in training the French elite, it has been called the "school of domination". According to Le Monde, the school's reputation for excellency and its prestige are such that some freshmen are sometimes "disillusioned" after having "fantasized" about the school.

Because of its role in training the French political, administrative and economic elite, the school has been criticized by far-left critics for the alleged close-mindedness of its students. Peter Gumbel called Sciences Po and other Grandes Écoles "elite colleges [which] have become a machine for perpetuating a brilliant but blinkered, often arrogant and frequently incompetent ruling freemasonry". The academic Gilles Devers criticized the institution for being the "base of the conservatism, and the mold of the molluscs that make the public elite" where "dissenting ideas are only admitted if they strengthen the system".

Sciences Po's core curriculum has historically been very transdisciplinary, as the students go through introductory classes to disciplines as diverse as political science, economics, history, law and international relations. This priority given to transversality of knowledge over expertise in one field has been the subject of praise as well as of criticism.

In 2021 Nicolas Metzger, a teacher and director of Sciences Po's governing body, the Conseil de l'Institut, criticized it for a "somewhat general decline in standards" and alleged grade inflation by means of "gaussiannized" grades to accommodate students from socially and economically disadvantaged backgrounds admitted via conventions d'éducation prioritaire and international students.

== Controversies ==
=== Duhamel scandal ===
Camille Kouchner, daughter of Bernard Kouchner, published a book in which she wrote that her step-father Olivier Duhamel, at that time president of the Foundation of Sciences Po which was the "heart of [his] power" for 30 years, sexually abused his step-son for two years during his childhood. Newspapers further unearthed a series of controversial attitudes among Duhamel's social circles toward the sexuality of minors. It led to a series of investigations on the environment of Duhamel at Sciences Po and on the way they dealt with these abuses.

The scandal eventually led to a series of resignations under pressure at Sciences Po. Duhamel resigned. While Frédéric Mion initially refused to resign, it later became apparent that he had lied about not having heard the rumors about Duhamel. He resigned.

Following the Duhamel scandal, Sciences Po issued a statement condemning "all forms of sexualized violence" and declaring "its shock and astonishment". It also stated: "The fight against sexual and gender-based violence is at the heart of our institution's core values and actions."

=== Sexual violence ===
After Richard Descoings, head of the school from 1997 to 2012, died, it was revealed that he had had sex with students, and made no case of Dominique Strauss-Kahn's habit of "seducing" young students. Descoings was accused of sending sexual messages to students, but no further inquiry was made.

In February 2021, hundreds of students and former students shared on Twitter allegations of rape or sexual abuse at several Instituts d'études politiques, and claimed that despite denunciations of victims, "colleagues and staff [were] unwilling to take their complaints seriously". A hashtag #SciencesPorcs ("Sciences Pigs", similar to the French #Metoo hashtag #Balancetonporcs) has been widely used to do so.

Among many op-eds dealing with the 2021 crisis at Sciences Po, two male alumni published in L'Express an op-ed specific to the sexual violence scandal, stating their disagreement with the "caricature" that is made of Sciences Po, which is allegedly the object of "passions, sometimes irrational ones" in the public "imaginary" because of the elite status they say the institute has; they assured there is no systemic problem regarding sexual violence in Sciences Po. Bénédicte Durand, interim administrator of the school, further told Le Figaro that "no, there is no rape culture in Sciences Po". The school published a report on sexual and sexist violence that was called "abundant but shy".

=== "Racialism" and social issues ===
Many students and some members of the French Parliament have expressed concern about the enforcement of "racialism" in Sciences Po.

=== Financial scandals ===
Alain Lancelot, director of Sciences Po from 1987 to 1996, was investigated for financial mismanagement by the French Court of Audit.

Under Richard Descoings, its director from 1997 to 2012, the school was hit by a few financial scandals. Descoings had been criticized for offering large sums of money (through salary rise, free accommodation, etc.) to diverse members of staff, including his wife, in spite of the fact that Sciences Po was partly state-funded.

In October 2012, the Court of Audit reprimanded Sciences Po for financial mismanagement, accusing it of opaque remuneration procedures, unwarranted expenses claims and excessive pay rises for managers. The Court noted that the school's complex legal status – a public institute managed by a private trust – had contributed to a dysfunction and waste. It also criticized the French government for increasing state funding for the school without insisting on additional public oversight.

In July 2015, Jean-Claude Casanova, the former president of the Foundation Nationale des Sciences Politiques, the private trust which manages Sciences Po, was fined €1500 for failing to properly consult the Foundation's Administrative Council over budgeting decisions involving public money. The Court of Financial and Budgetary Discipline eventually found Casanova guilty, but gave him a lenient sentence because the procedures had some part of regularity and because it was not customary in Sciences Po to follow all the financial rules.

In February 2016, the Court of Audit noted that reforms had been made, but stated that greater transparency was still needed. Frédéric Mion, the then director of Sciences Po, defended the school's reforms.

=== Access to the Bar ===
In 2007, a governmental decree authorized Sciences Po students to pass the Bar exam, provided they take a master's degree in law. This led to academics in universities to label the move as a "coup", fearing that Sciences Po students would crowd out law students from the universities at the bar. According to them, Sciences Po did not offer enough law courses for barristers to have a solid education in law.

In 2009, Sciences Po created its law school, the "École de droit de Sciences Po" ("law school", as opposed in French to a faculté de droit, "faculty of law"), delivering masters (graduate) degrees. In 2008, partly as an answer, Paris II Panthéon-Assas created a collège de droit (undergraduate level) and then an "école de droit" (graduate level) on top of its faculty of law to attract top students in France. A lot of universities followed this model, and created these selective "colleges" or "schools".

== Notable people ==
=== Alumni ===
It has been customary to graduate in Sciences Po in addition to a law school or a grande école in Paris, therefore many of these graduates are also graduates of the latter.

In 2016, the Sciences Po Alumni Association declared that there were 55,000 alumni. Many alumni are notable for their roles in fields such as politics or business.

==== Politics ====
French Presidents of the Fifth Republic who attended Sciences Po

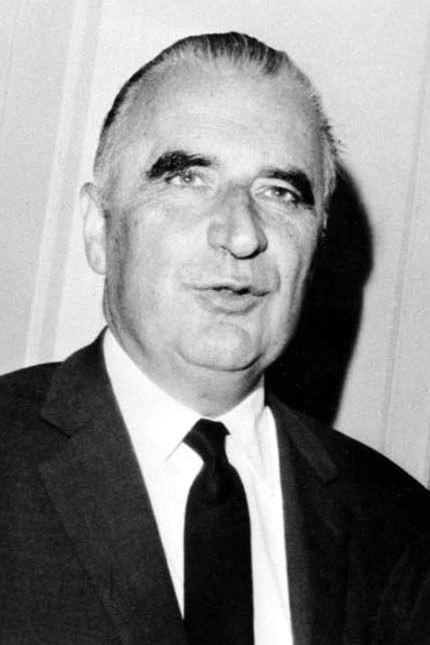
Georges Pompidou, 2nd President of the French Fifth Republic

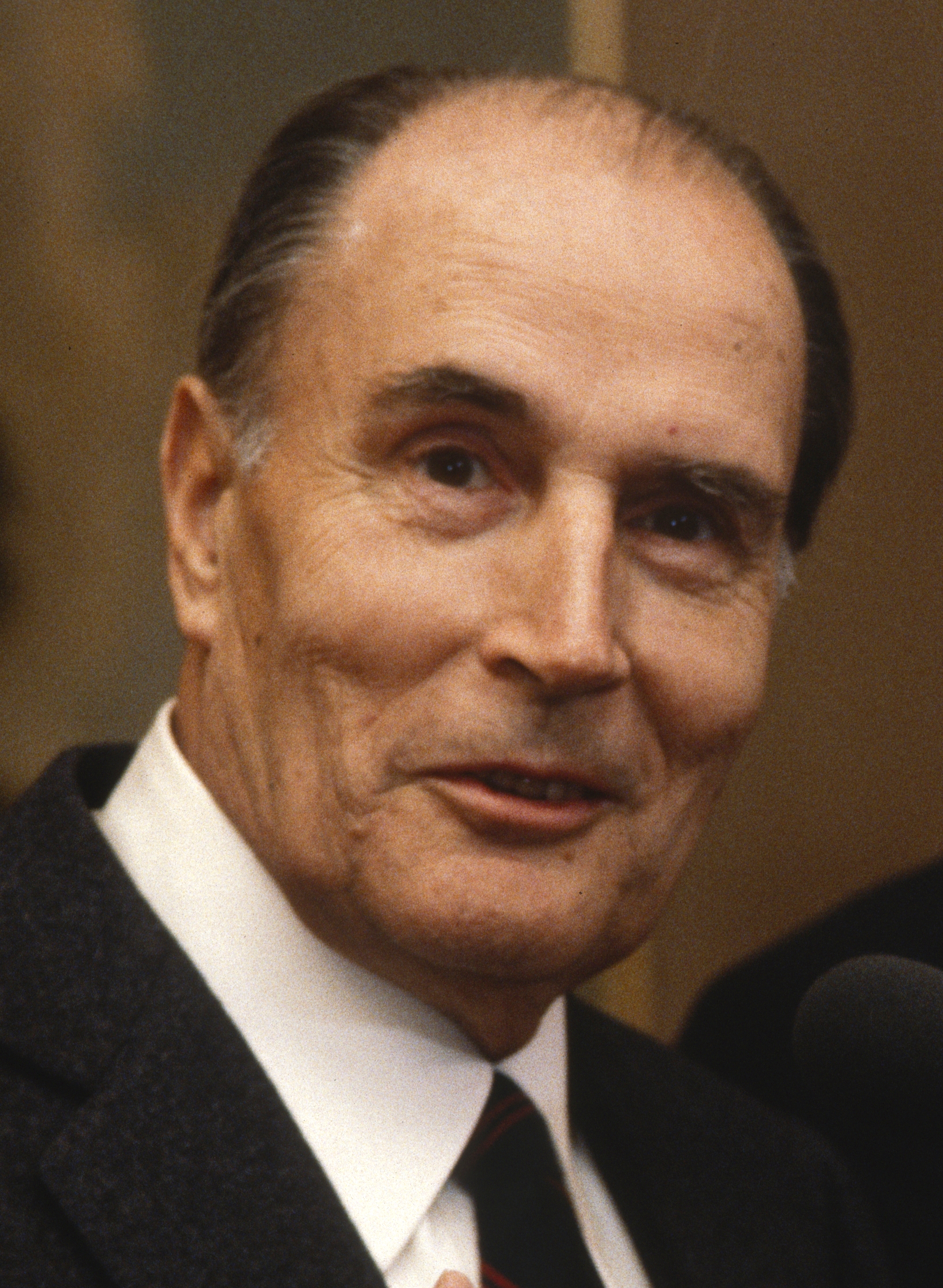
François Mitterrand, 4th President of the French Fifth Republic

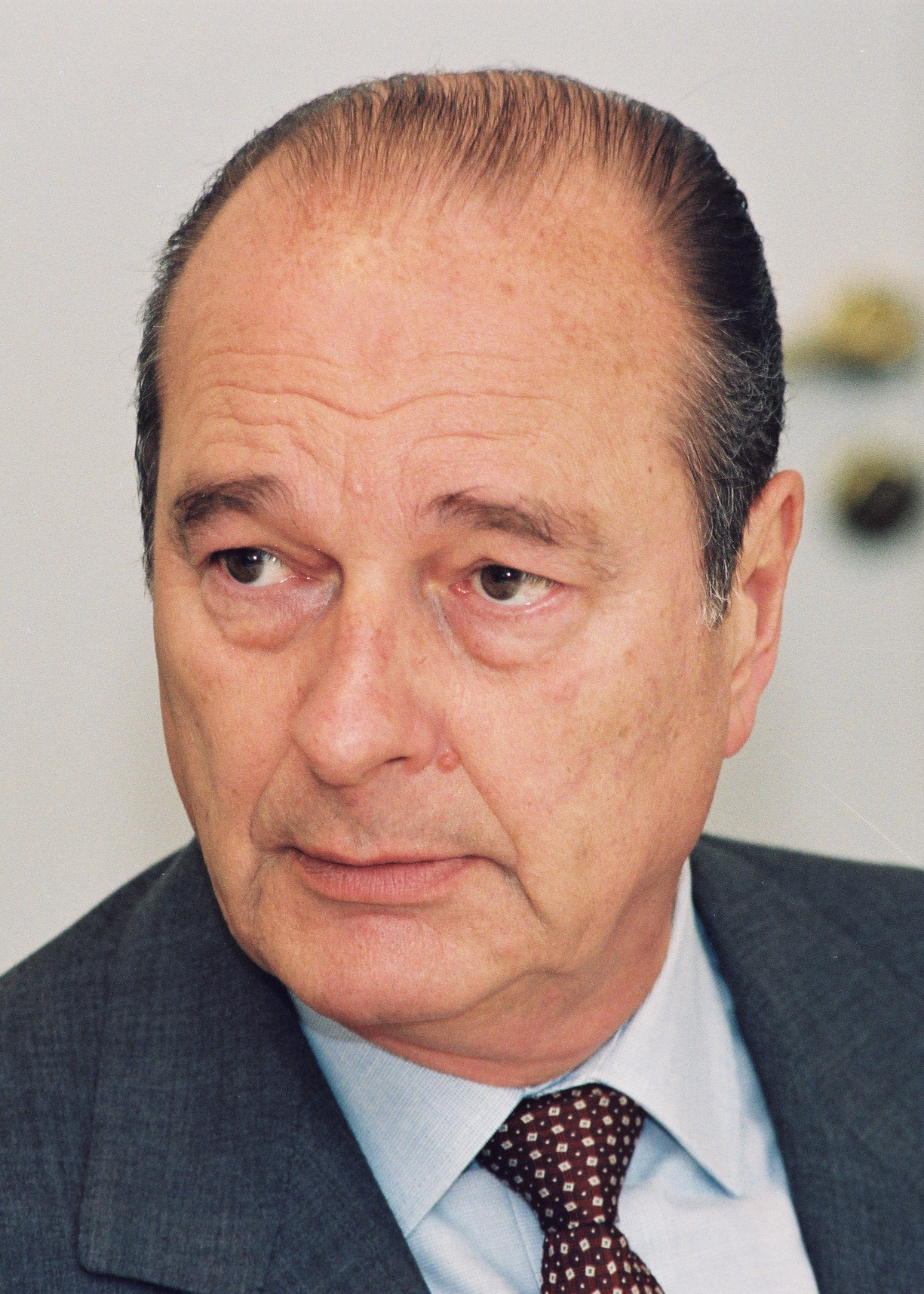
Jacques Chirac, 5th President of the French Fifth Republic

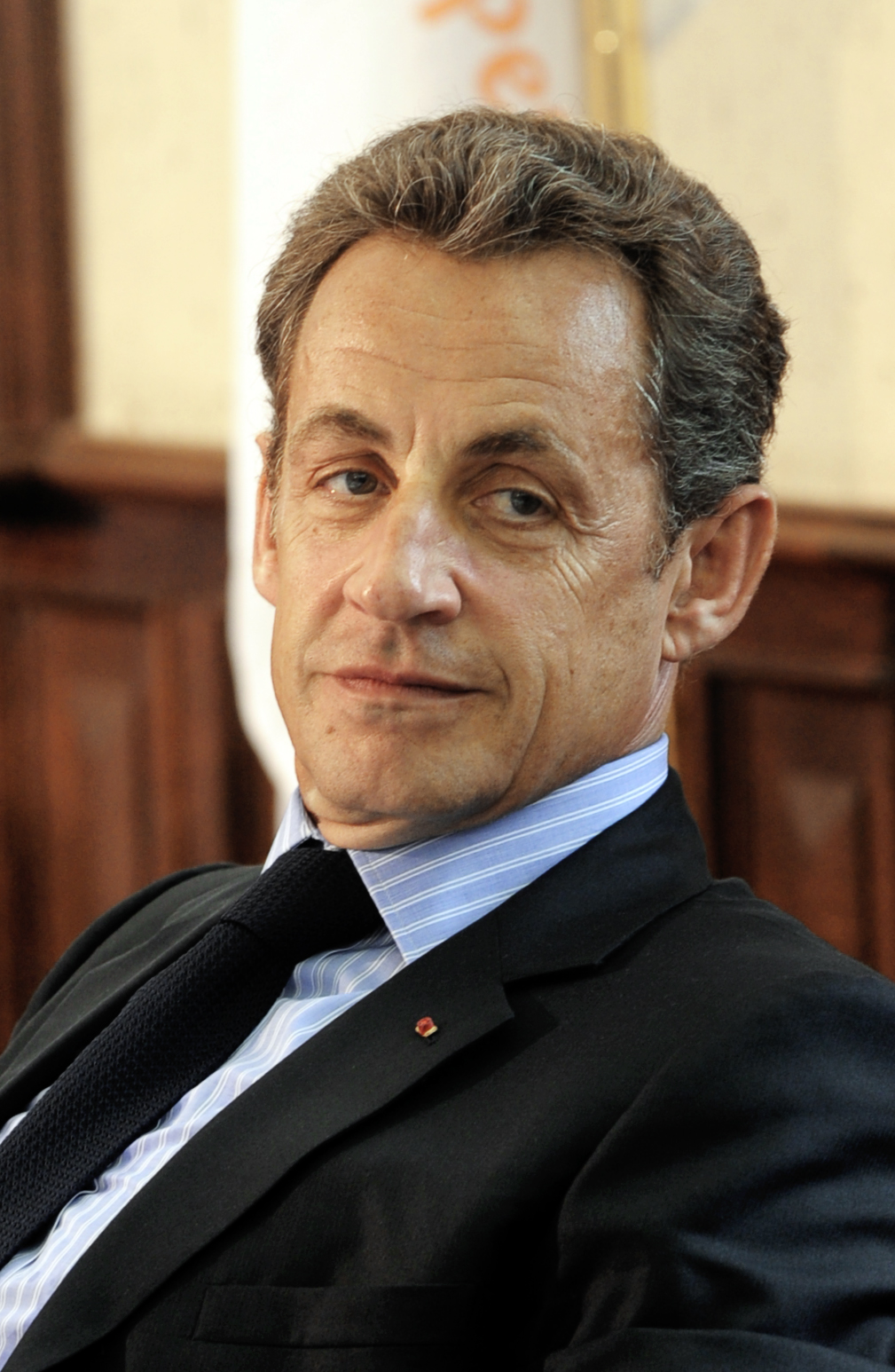
Nicolas Sarkozy, 6th President of the French Fifth Republic

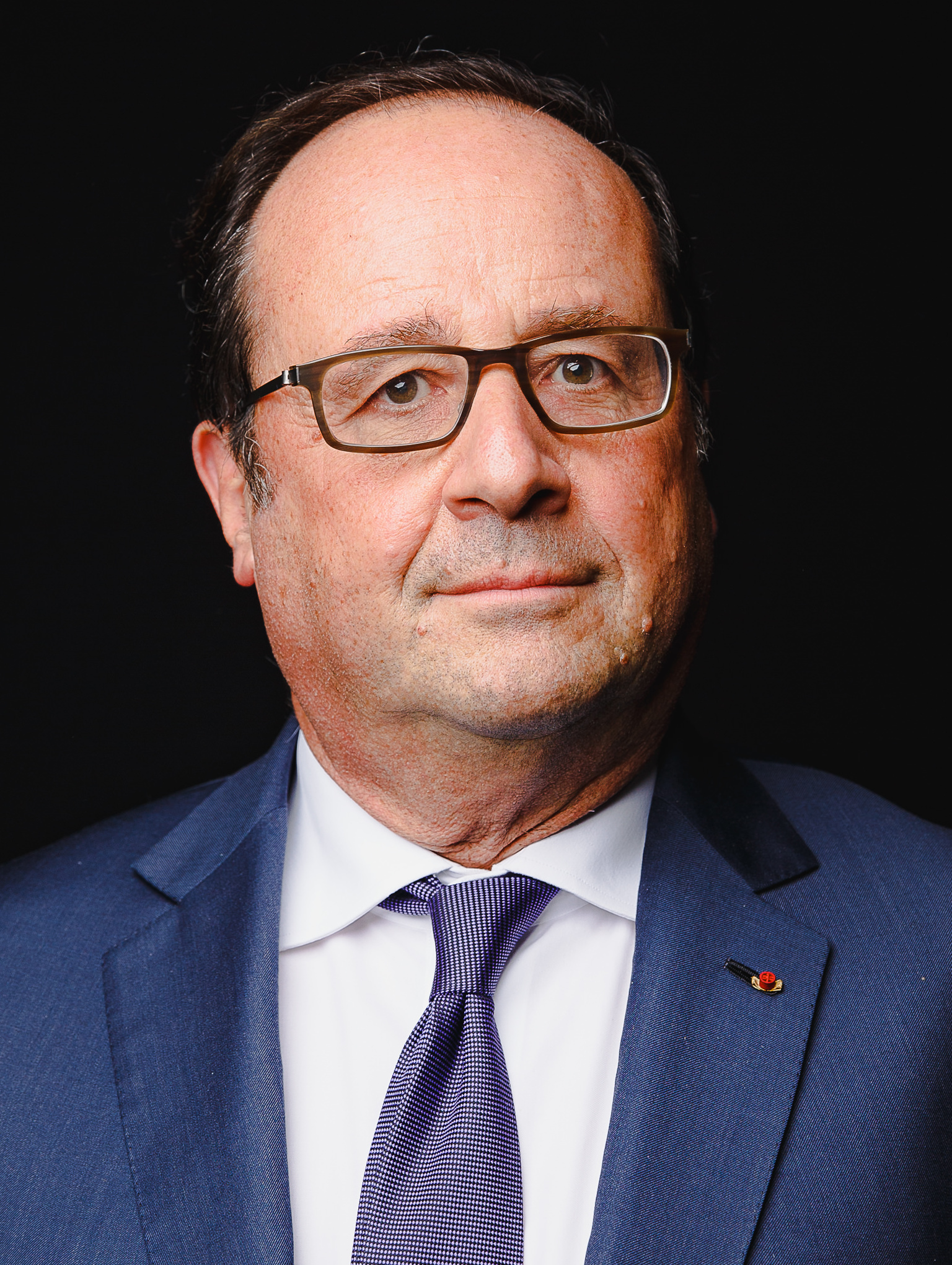
François Hollande, 7th President of the French Fifth Republic

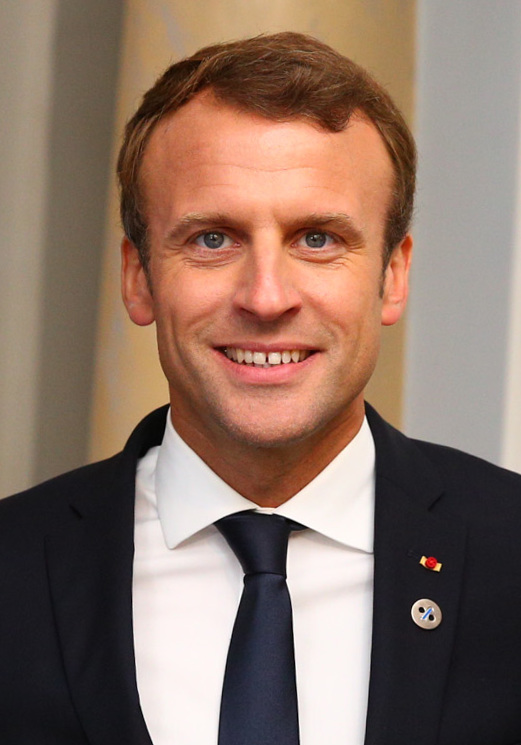
Emmanuel Macron, 8th and Incumbent President of the French Fifth Republic

Six of the eight presidents of the French Fifth Republic have attended Sciences Po, including Georges Pompidou, François Mitterrand, Jacques Chirac, Nicolas Sarkozy, François Hollande, and Emmanuel Macron. Alain Poher (who served twice as acting president) was also an alumnus. A number of French politicians who are Sciences Po alumni also graduated from École Nationale d'Administration (ENA), as the Sciences Po degree and its preparatory programmes have shown high admittance rates to the ENA.

In 2017, 14% (81 of the 577) of French members of parliament elected that year were Sciences Po graduates, the most represented institution of higher learning and grande école in the National Assembly.

Some politicians having a role in international organisations were also students at Sciences Po, including Simone Veil, former President of the European Parliament; Boutros Boutros-Ghali, former UN Secretary General; Pascal Lamy, former Director-General of the World Trade Organisation; Michel Camdessus and Dominique Strauss-Kahn, former presidents of the International Monetary Fund; Jean-Claude Trichet, former President of the European Central Bank; and Marisol Touraine, Chair of Unitaid Executive Board.

Sciences Po is also alma mater to politicians including Władysław Grabski (Prime Minister of Poland 1920, 1923–1925), Habib Bourgiba (Prime Minister of the Kingdom of Tunisia 1956–1957 and the first President of the Tunisian Republic 1957–1987), Joseph Ki-Zerbo (Burkinabé advocate for African independence), Edem Tengue (Togolese first minister of maritime economy fishery and coastal protection(2020–2024)),Mohammad Mosaddegh (Prime Minister of Iran 1951–1953), Pierre Trudeau (Prime Minister of Canada 1968–1979, 1980–1984), Thanat Khoman (Thai Minister of Foreign Affairs 1959–1971 and Deputy Prime Minister 1981–1983) and Salome Zourabichvili (President of Georgia since 2018).

Among the recipients of Sciences Po doctorate honoris causa are Václav Havel (2009), Luiz Inácio Lula da Silva (2011), Elena Zhemkova (2022), and Angela Merkel (2023).

==== Diplomacy ====
Senior French diplomats including Jean-Marcel Jeanneney (France's first Ambassador to Algeria) François Delattre (currently Permanent Representative of France to the UN), Gérard Araud (former ambassador to the USA), Sylvie Bermann (currently ambassador to Russia), Bernard Émié (former Director of the DGSE), Jean-Maurice Ripert (former Permanent Representative of France to the United Nations, Ambassador of France to Russia, and Ambassador of France to China), and Maurice Gourdault-Montagne (ambassador to China) are also alumni.

==== Other ====
The writer Marcel Proust, the founder of the modern Olympics Pierre de Coubertin, fashion designer Christian Dior, author Leïla Slimani, author Emmanuel Carrère, Harvard University Professor of political science Stanley Hoffmann, Chinese linguist Ma Jianzhong, Director of Paris Peace Forum Justin Vaïsse, journalist Arthur Dreyfus, researcher, Margaret Maruani, political scientist Tiago C. Peixoto, and former Le Monde editor Jean-Marie Colombani were all graduated from Sciences Po.

=== Notable staff ===
Jurist and 1907 Nobel Peace Prize laureate Louis Renault taught international law at Sciences Po from its foundation in 1875 until his death in 1918. Arbitrator Emmanuel Gaillard taught at the Law School until his death.

Economist Jean-Paul Fitoussi taught at Sciences Po from 1982 to 2010. Michel Aglietta and Yann Algan also taught economics there.

The philosopher, anthropologist and sociologist Bruno Latour taught at Sciences Po from 2006 until his death in 2022. Paul Janet also taught philosophy at Sciences Po. Frédéric Gros teaches philosophy at Sciences Po.

The sociologists Michel Crozier and Erhard Friedberg taught at Sciences Po and founded its sociology department (Center for the Sociology of Organizations).

Pierre Hassner, a French geopolitologist and philosopher, was director emeritus of Research at the Sciences Po Center for International Studies and Research. Pierre Renouvin, a French historian of international relations, taught at Sciences Po from 1938 to 1970. Jean-Baptiste Duroselle taught from 1946 to 1983. More recently, Gilles Kepel taught there starting from 2001.

Jean-Luc Parodi, a French political scientist, worked at the Sciences Po Center of Political Research for the entirety of his career.

Élie Halévy taught history of English political ideas and socialism at Sciences Po from 1896 until his death in 1937. Raoul Girardet started teaching at Sciences Po in 1956. René Rémond taught history starting from 1956. Marc Lazar taught history from 1999 to 2022.

Among French presidents, Raymond Poincaré taught at Sciences Po in the 1900s, as well as Paul Deschanel. Georges Pompidou taught philosophy at Sciences Po starting from the 1950s. Jacques Chirac taught economics in the 1960s. François Hollande was an adjunct lecturer in economics at Sciences Po until 1991. Emmanuel Macron was an adjunct lecturer in philosophy in the mid-2000s.^{,} The Prime minister Raymond Barre taught economics starting from the 1960s.

=== Presidents of the FNSP and directors of Sciences Po ===
==== National foundation of Sciences Po (FNSP) ====
- 1945–1959: André Siegfried
- 1959–1971: Pierre Renouvin
- 1971–1981: François Goguel
- 1981–2007: René Rémond
- 2007–2016: Jean-Claude Casanova
- 2016–2021: Olivier Duhamel
- 2021–present: Laurence Bertrand Dorléac

==== Sciences Po ====
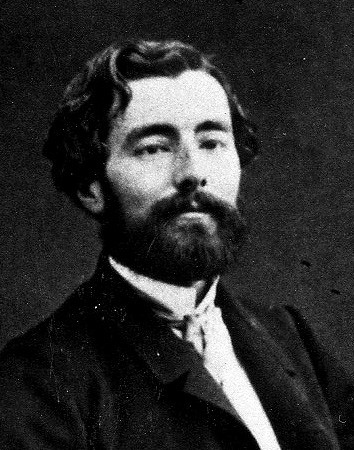
Émile Boutmy

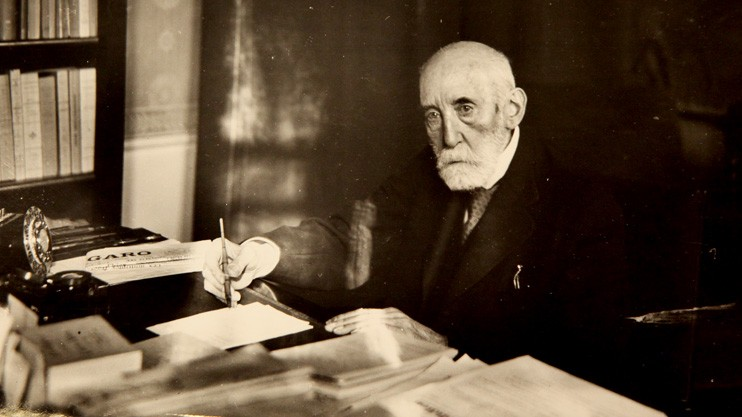
Eugène d'Eichthal

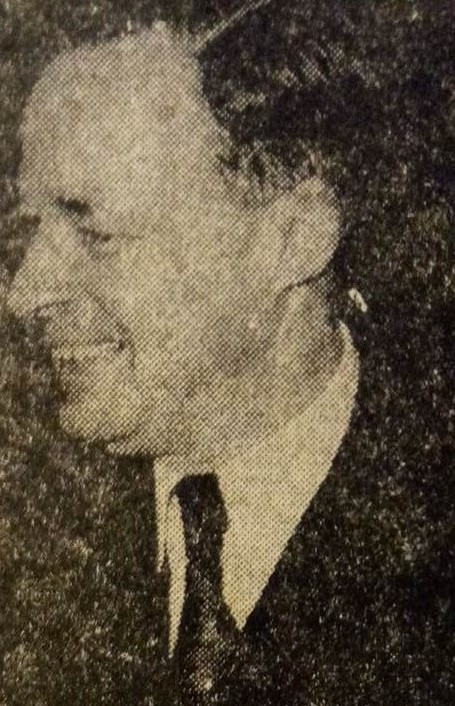
Roger Seydoux

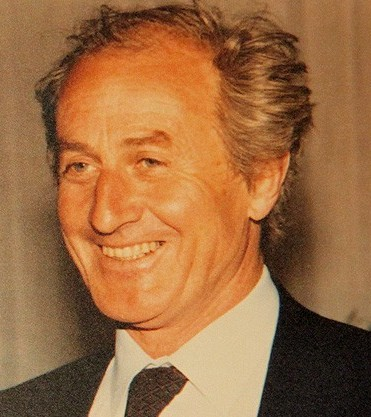
Michel Gentot

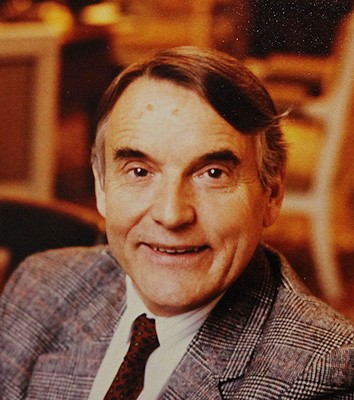
Alain Lancelot

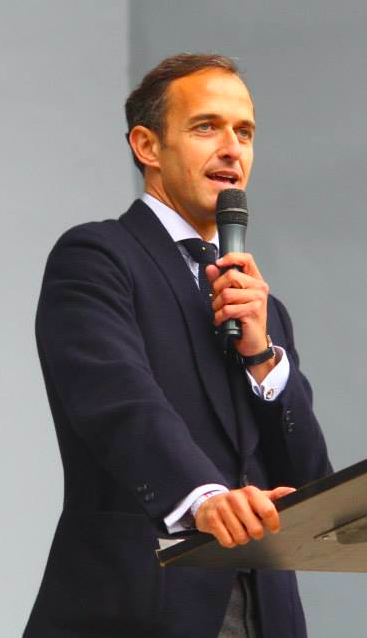
Frédéric Mion

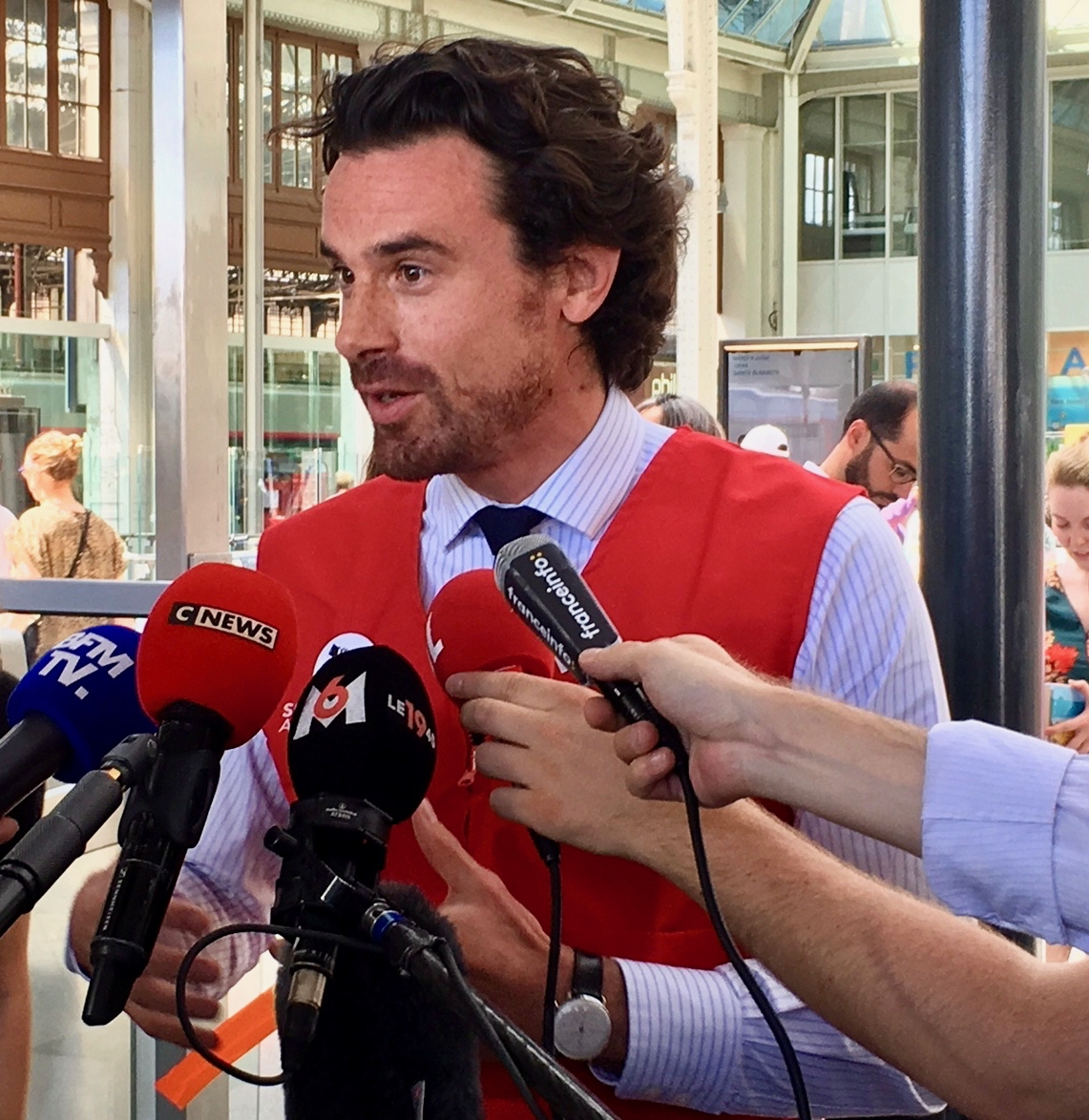
Mathias Vicherat

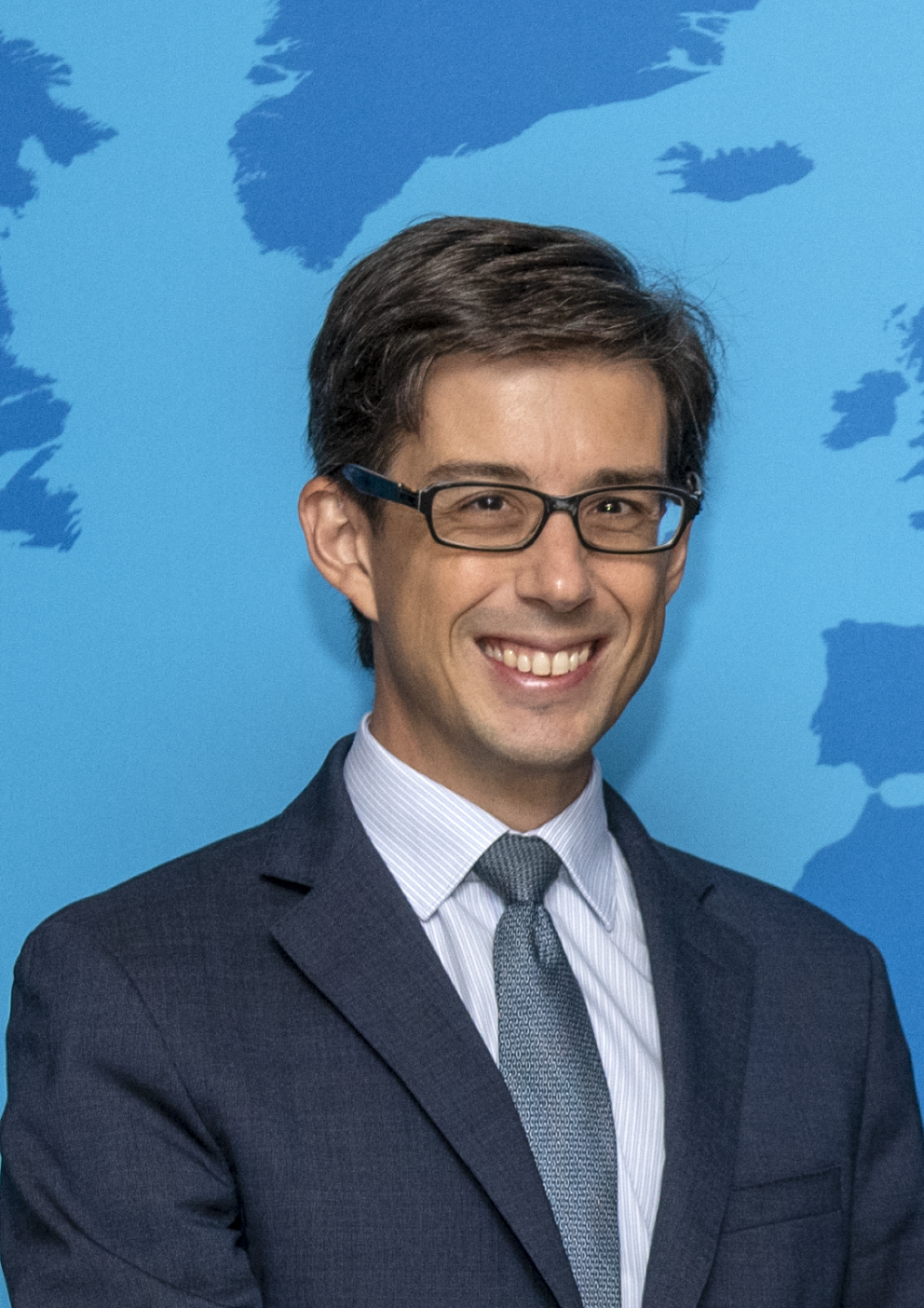
Luis Vassy

Directors of the Paris Institute of Political Studies and Administrators of the National Foundation of Political Sciences
- 1872–1906: Émile Boutmy
- 1906–1936: Eugène d'Eichthal
- 1945–1947: Roger Seydoux
- 1947–1979: Jacques Chapsal
- 1979–1987: Michel Gentot
- 1987–1996: Alain Lancelot
- 1997–2012: Richard Descoings
- 2013–2021: Frédéric Mion
- 2021–2024: Mathias Vicherat
- 2024: Jean Bassères (interim)
- 2024–present: Luis Vassy

== See also ==
- Association of Professional Schools of International Affairs
- École nationale d'administration
- Grandes écoles
- Grands établissements
- Instituts d'études politiques
- List of Sciences Po honorary doctorate laureates
- Paris School of International Affairs

== Bibliography ==
- Richard Descoings, Sciences Po. De la Courneuve à Shanghai, préface de René Rémond, Paris: Presses de Sciences Po, 2007 (ISBN 2-7246-0990-5)
- Jacques Chapsal, " L'Institut d'études politiques de l'Université de Paris ", Annales de l'Université de Paris, n° 1, 1950
- " Centenaire de l'Institut d'études politiques de Paris (1872–1972) ", brochure de l'Institut d'études politiques de Paris, 1972
- A Sciences-Po, les voyages forment la jeunesse, Monde Diplomatique, Février 2006
- Pierre Favre, Cent dix années de cours à l'École libre des sciences politiques et à l'Institut d'études politiques de Paris (1871–1982), thèse de doctorat, 2 volumes, 1986
- Gérard Vincent, Sciences Po. Histoire d'une réussite, Orban, Paris, 1987
- Marie-Estelle Leroty, L'Enseignement de l'histoire à l'École libre des sciences politiques et à l'Institut d'études politiques de l'Université de Paris de 1943 à 1968, mémoire de diplôme d'études approfondies dirigé par Jean-François Sirinelli, Institut d'études politiques de Paris, 2000
- Anne Muxel (direction), Les Étudiants de Sciences Po, Paris: Presses de Sciences Po, 2004, ISBN 2-7246-0937-9: Résultats d'une grande enquête menée en janvier 2002 auprès des élèves par le Cevipof
- Comité national d'évaluation des établissements publics à caractère scientifique, culturel et professionnel, Rapport d'évaluation de l'Institut d'études politiques de Paris, Septembre 2005
- Cyril Delhay, Promotion ZEP. Des quartiers à Sciences Po, Paris: Hachette, 2006, ISBN 2-01-235949-3
