= Sciences Po Law School =

Law school in Paris, France

- École de droit de Sciences Po
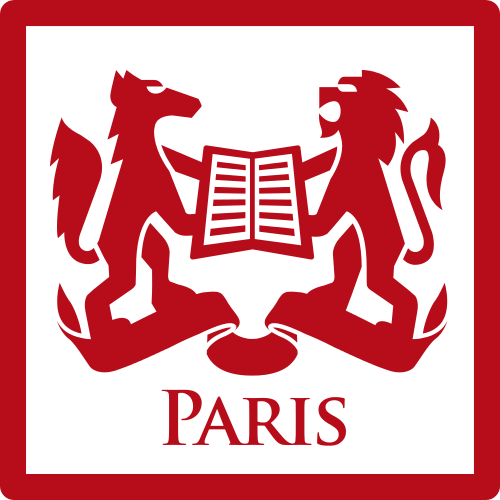
- Type: Public graduate school
- Established: 2009; 17 years ago
- Parent institution: Sciences Po
- Budget: €192 million (total Sciences Po budget for 13,000 students)
- Dean: Julie Klein
- Academic staff: 20 Professors, 2 Associate Professors, 9 Affiliate Professors, numerous visiting lecturers
- Students: 944
- Location: Paris, France
- Campus: Urban
- Website: www.sciencespo.fr/ecole-de-droit/en.html

Sciences Po Law School (French: L'École de droit de Sciences Po) is a graduate school created in 2009 inside Sciences Po in Paris, France.

== History ==
In 2009, Sciences Po created the "École de droit de Sciences Po" ("law school", as opposed in French to a faculté de droit, "faculty of law"), delivering graduate degrees only, after a controversy regarding the access to the bar for Sciences Po students.

== Academics ==
=== Teaching ===
Sciences Po Law School is an exclusively graduate program and admits students without undergraduate legal education.

It contains:

- two master programs in Law: a two-year Master in Economic Law, which can be followed in either French or English and a two-year Master in Legal and Judicial Career taught entirely in French). Students of the Master in Economic Law can take a gap year between the two years of the program.
- a three-year joint Master in Law and Finance with Sciences Po's School of Management and Innovation
- a one-year LLM in Transnational Arbitration and Dispute Settlement
- a PhD program

Sciences Po Law School also contains 4 joint master degrees with Columbia Law School, the University of Virginia School of Law, Northwestern University Pritzker School of Law and Duke University School of Law.

=== Student body ===
40% of its student population are exchange students from abroad (outgoing students going from the whole institute).

== Rankings and performance ==
=== Rankings ===
Among international english-speaking rankings, Sciences Po is ranked in Law:

- 59th (2nd in France) by QS World University Rankings
- not ranked among the top 187 by The Times Higher Education (2 ranked in France).

In the French national Eduniversal ranking, rankings are in France:

- Economic Law: 4th of France
- European and International Business Law: 8th of France
- Undergraduate program: not ranked among the top 10

It was not ranked among the top 10 or 15 in France in Business Law, Business Law and Management, Tax law and Social Law.

=== Performance ===
Sciences Po graduates report a 67% success in the Bar Exam in 2017 (the national average was around 27% the same year).

In 2018, the success rate for the school’s preparatory school (available for students from other universities) at the French National School for the Judiciary entrance exam was 45% (79 out of 180), with 8 students in the top 10 and 20 in the top 30.

In 2018, 70% of the students of the Master in Economic law (the top Sciences Po Law program) have found a job six months after they graduated.

== Notable faculty ==
- George Bermann, international arbitration lawyer
- Emmanuel Gaillard, head of Shearman & Sterling's International Arbitration practice
