= Sciences Po Journalism School =

French journalism school in Paris

- École de journalisme de Sciences Po
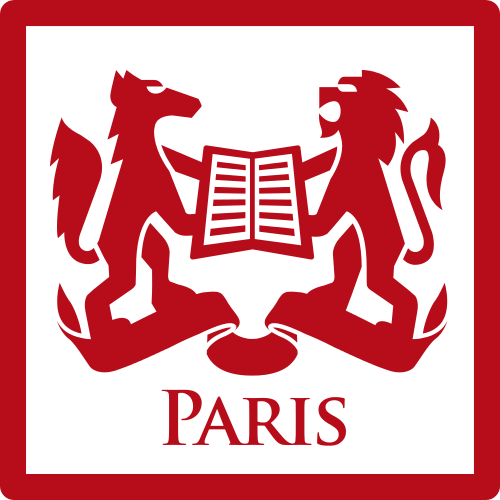
- Type: Public graduate school
- Established: 2004; 22 years ago
- Parent institution: Sciences Po
- Budget: €192 million (total Sciences Po budget for 13,000 students)
- Dean: Marie Mawad
- Faculty: 160
- Students: 165
- Location: Paris, France
- Campus: Urban
- Website: www.sciencespo.fr/ecole-journalisme/en/

Sciences Po Journalism School (French: École de journalisme de Sciences Po) is a graduate school of journalism created in 2004 inside Sciences Po in Paris, France.

It is the best journalism school in France according to the latest ranking by the French newspaper Le Figaro in 2022, ahead of the École supérieure de journalisme at the University of Lille and the Centre de formation des journalistes at Panthéon-Assas University, in Paris.

== History ==
In October 2003, the prestigious French semi-public university Sciences Po announced its intention to create a school of journalism the following year, with the aim of offering a "renewed and innovative vision of the requirements of the journalism profession, from a resolutely international perspective".

In September 2004, Sciences Po created the "École de journalisme de Sciences Po", delivering graduate degrees only. According to Ivan Chupin, the creation of a journalism school by a leading semi-public university could be seen at the time as an attempt to subvert the model of professional excellence previously developed by private journalism schools such as the École supérieure de journalisme de Lille (ESJ) and the Centre de formation des journalistes (CFJ). Ironically, these two private J-Schools have since integrated public universities as part of public-private partnerships: the University of Lille for the ESJ and Assas University in Paris for the CFJ.

== Academics ==
=== Teaching ===
Sciences Po Journalism School is an exclusively graduate program.

It contains two master programs in Journalism:

- a two-year Master in Journalism, which can be followed in French only,
- and a two-year Master in Journalism and International Affairs with Sciences Po's School of International Affairs (PSIA), which can be followed in English only.

Sciences Po Law School also contains a joint master's degree with Columbia University Journalism School and the Paris School of International Affairs (PSIA).

=== Student body ===
28% of its student population are exchange students from abroad (outgoing students going from the whole institute).

== Rankings and performance ==
=== Rankings ===
In the French national Le Figaro Journalism school ranking:

- 1st of France since 2022

== Notable faculty ==
- Alfred de Montesquiou, contemporary French reporter. A laureate of France's highest journalism prize, the Prix Albert Londres.
