= École supérieure de journalisme de Lille =

Journalism school in Lille, France

Coordinates: 50°37′43.705″N 3°3′50.371″E

ESJ, University of Lille
- École supérieure de journalisme de Lille
- Other names: ESJ Lille
- Motto: Former celles et ceux qui vous informent.
- Motto in English: Train those who keep you informed.
- Type: Privé d'intérêt général (Private), but part of a public university
- Established: 1946
- Parent institution: University of Lille
- Affiliations: Agence universitaire de la Francophonie, Conférence des écoles de journalisme, University of Versailles Saint-Quentin-en-Yvelines, Paris-Saclay University
- President: Pierre Savary
- Students: 1,000
- Location: Lille, France
- Campus: urban
- Colors: Red; White
- Website: esj-lille.fr

The École supérieure de journalisme de Lille (French pronunciation: [ekɔl sypeʁjœʁ də ʒuʁnalism də lil], Superior School of Journalism of Lille, abbr. ESJ Lille) is a private non-profit institution of higher education, a French Grande École in Lille dedicated to journalism and related studies. The ESJ is a graduate school of the University of Lille as part of a public-private partnership.

It has been elected best French journalism school in 2013 by Le Figaro. It is one of the top 3 journalism schools in France, alongside the CFJ at the Paris-Panthéon-Assas University and the Sciences Po Journalism School.

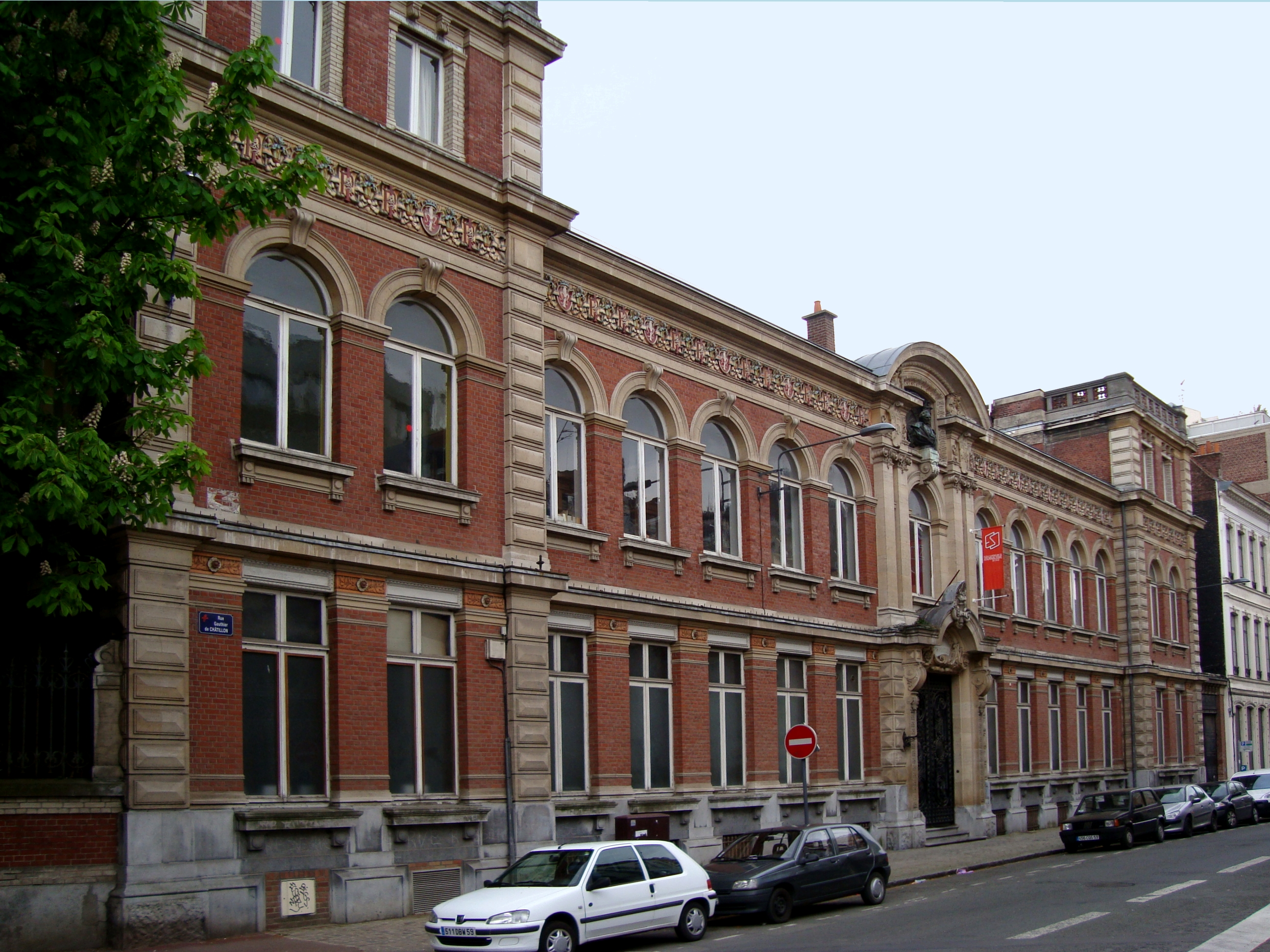
École supérieure de journalisme

== History ==
Founded by the lawyer Paul Verschave (1878-1947), the ESJ Lille opens its doors on the first Tuesday of November, within the Catholic University of Lille. In 1956, ESJ Lille was approved by the profession under the collective agreement of journalists, which limits to one year the professional training of its graduates. In 1960, ESJ Lille became a private higher education institution. Taking charge by his former pupils who create, according to the French law of 1901, the Association of the Higher School of Journalism of Lille. In 1969, the ESJ Lille was recognized by the State under the Decree of 24 April.

In 1981, ESJ Lille moved into its current premises, 50 rue Gauthier-de-Châtillon, in the heart of Lille. It's still there. In 1983, the ESJ Lille diploma was recognized by the State, which authorizes it to issue a diploma bearing the official visa by virtue of the decree of 18 February 1983. The board of directors of ESJ Lille, including representatives of the professional circles (publishers and journalists) and alumni of the school, is enriched by the presence of representatives of higher education, local authorities, regional companies. In 2014, ESJ Lille created ESJ Lille Academy, a post-baccalaureate course in partnership with the Lille universities, enabling students to learn about the press and prepare for competitions in journalism schools. On 10, 11 and 12 October 2014, ESJ Lille celebrated its 90th anniversary.

- Degree :

After the completion of two years of coursework, the school awards a diploma (similar to a Master's degree in the United States).

- Online Degree :

The school has a partnership with the Saclay University in Versailles for an online degree in Climate Change and Media.

== Academic partnerships ==
- University of Versailles
- Saclay University (Paris)
- Institut d'Administration des Entreprises
- University of Lille

== Notable alumni ==
- Benoît Duquesne
- Henri Aubry
- Benoît Bringer
- Jean-Paul Kauffmann
- Christian Prudhomme
