= Richard Descoings =

French civil servant (1958–2012)

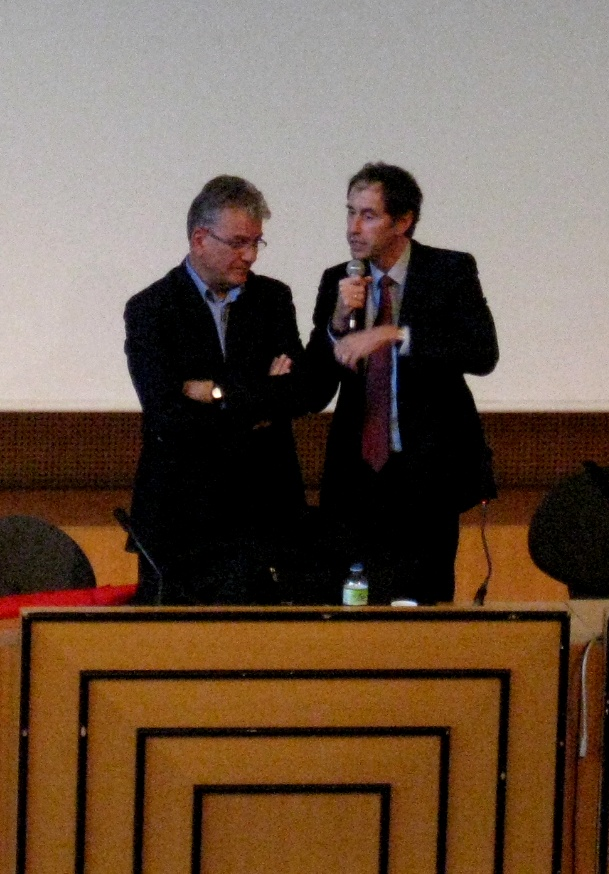
- Descoings (right) in 2010

Director of Sciences Po
- In office 1996–2012
- Preceded by: Alain Lancelot
- Succeeded by: Frédéric Mion

Personal details
- Born: 23 June 1958 Paris, France
- Died: 3 April 2012 (aged 53) New York City, United States
- Spouse: Nadia Marik (m. 2004)
- Education: Lycée Henri-IV
- Alma mater: Sciences Po, ÉNA

Richard Descoings (French: [ʁiʃaʁ dekwɛ̃]; 23 June 1958 – 3 April 2012) was a French civil servant. He was serving as the Director of the Paris Institute of Political Studies (French: Institut d'études politiques de Paris or Sciences Po Paris), and as such as the Chief Administrator of the National Foundation of Political Science (Fondation nationale des sciences politiques, FNSP). These two entities are collectively referred to as Sciences Po (see Use of Sciences Po), and are two of the most prestigious public policy research and teaching bodies in Europe. Descoings was also a senior member of the Conseil d'État.

== Early life ==
Descoings was born in Paris, where he graduated from the Institut d'études politiques (Sciences Po) in 1980, and subsequently studied at the École nationale d'administration from 1983 to 1985.

== Career ==
From 1985 to 1989, he worked as an auditor in the legal section of the Conseil d'État and, in 1987, was appointed special advisor to Alain Lancelot, Director of the Institut d'études politiques de Paris.

In 1989, he was appointed deputy director of the Institut d’études politiques de Paris, and remained in that post until 1991 when he was appointed Counsel (conseiller d'État) of the Conseil d'État. From 1991 to 1993, he was successively technical advisor to the cabinet of the Minister for the Budget, with particular responsibility for monitoring the national education and higher education budget, and then special advisor to the Minister of National Education with responsibility for budgetary issues.

From 1993 to 1996, he was appointed Deputy General Reporter on the report and studies section of the Conseil d'État and on the task force on the responsibilities and organization of the State. From 1995 to 1996, he worked as government commissioner for legal training at the Conseil d'État. He was appointed the chief figure at Sciences Po in 1996.

As director of Sciences Po, he implemented significant reforms that transformed the institution from a nationally focused school into a more diverse and internationally oriented university. Prior to his tenure, Sciences Po primarily recruited top students from elite French secondary schools (lycées) and prepared them for careers in public service, often through training conducted by senior civil servants and distinguished practitioners.

A major aspect of Descoings’ reforms was an affirmative action initiative launched in 2001, aimed at recruiting students from disadvantaged areas in the Paris region. This approach faced opposition from some conservative student groups but was defended as essential for democratizing access to elite education and renewing the French political and economic elite. He was an éminence grise to the Socialist party's presidential candidate François Hollande and close to other French politicians.

In 2005, Sciences Po introduced a differentiated tuition system, charging higher fees to wealthier students while providing bursaries to those with lower incomes. Additionally, first-year campuses were established in six French cities, each with a regional or international focus, such as a Europe-Asia campus in Le Havre and a Europe–North America campus in Reims.

Descoings also emphasized academic growth and internationalization. He expanded the student body from under 5,000 to over 10,000, encouraged research, and aligned the curriculum with the Bologna Process, extending many programs to a five-year course including a year abroad. Partnerships were established with 400 universities worldwide, and the proportion of international students rose to 40% of new entrants. Sciences Po’s autonomous status, combining public and private funding, allowed for innovative academic programs and strengthened connections with government, politics, and major French companies.

For his service to the French Republic, Descoings was awarded Knight of the Order of Merit and Knight of the Order of Academic Palms. He was also awarded Commander of the Brazilian Order of Rio Branco and an honorary doctorates from Waseda University, Japan.

== Death ==
On the afternoon on 3 April 2012, Descoings was found dead in a Manhattan luxury hotel room on the seventh floor. Descoings was in New York for a United Nations conference for university presidents at Columbia University. He had failed to appear that morning for the conference with colleagues, whom they assumed that he had left for the event. Hotel staff were later requested to check on him hours prior, but found him to be asleep.

The circumstances surrounding his premature death and his dissolute lifestyle have generated rumours of foul play in the media, as he was found naked with his laptop and cellphone thrown onto a third-floor ledge. Prescription drugs were also found in his hotel room. Early news reports cited police sources claiming that two men visited his room on the night before his death and that they may have been male prostitutes, though this was not confirmed by the NYPD. It was determined that he died a natural death of "causes related to hypertension."

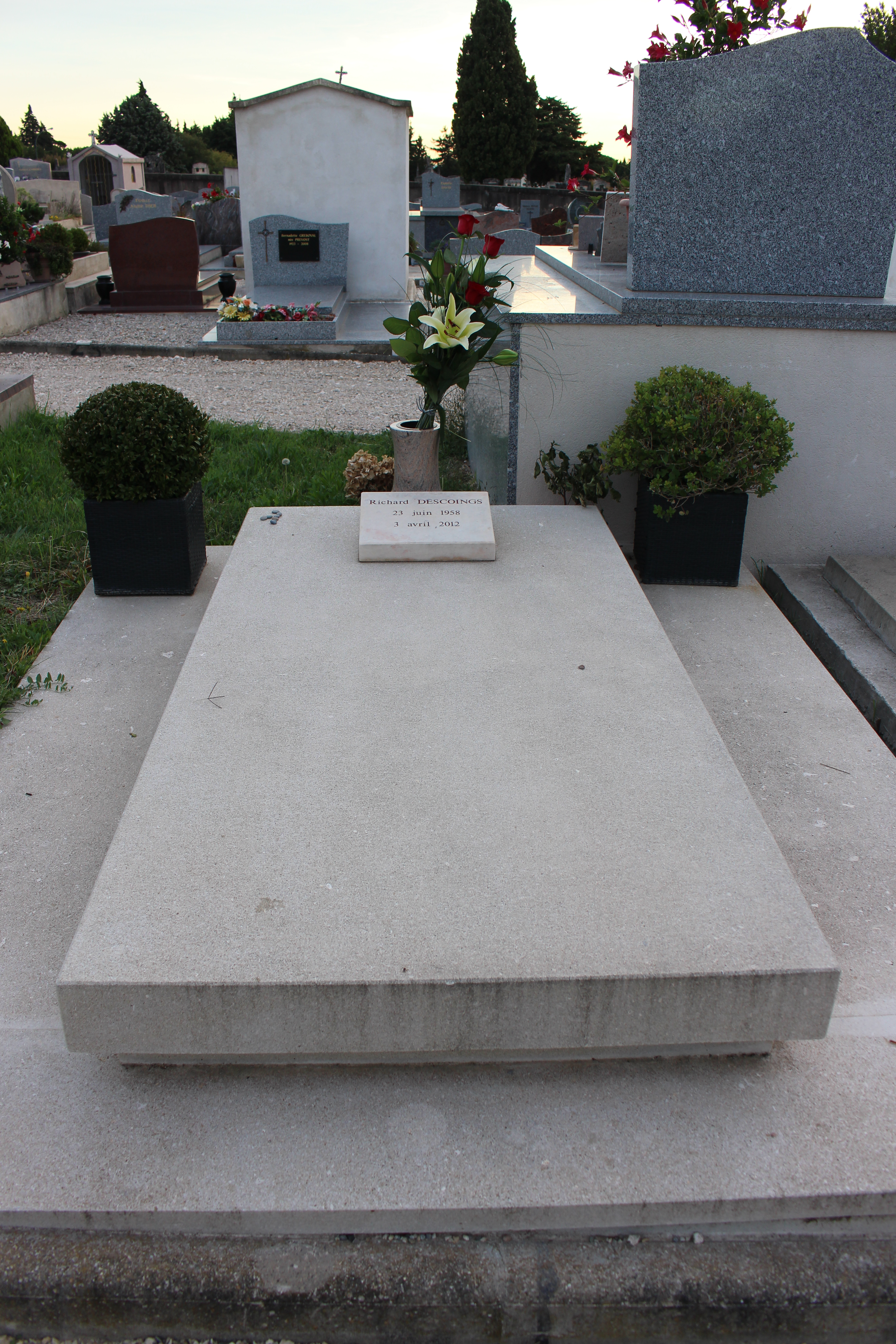
Grave of Richard Descoings at the Pernes-les-Fontaines cemetery

He is buried at the cemetery of Pernes-les-Fontaines in southeastern France.

== Bibliography ==
- Raphaëlle Bacqué, Richie, Paris, Grasset, 2015
