= Frédéric Mion =

French civil servant (born 1969)

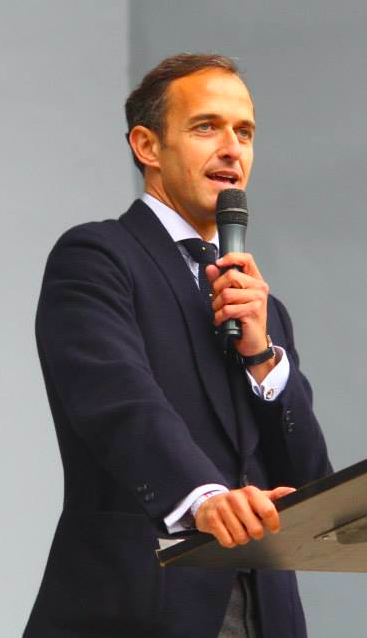
- Mion in 2018

Director of Sciences Po
- In office 2 April 2013 – 9 February 2021
- Preceded by: Richard Descoings
- Succeeded by: Mathias Vicherat

Master of Requests of the Council of State
- In office 1999–2019

Auditor of the Council of State
- In office 1996–1999

Personal details
- Born: 30 August 1969 (age 56) Montpellier, France
- Education: Lycée Henri-IV
- Alma mater: École normale supériere Sciences Po; Princeton University; École nationale d'administration
- Profession: Civil servant, lawyer

Frédéric Mion (French pronunciation: [fʁedeʁik mjɔ̃]; born 30 August 1969) is a French civil servant, and former director of Sciences Po. Formerly, he was Secretary-General of Canal+.

== Biography ==
=== Education ===
Student at the lycée du Mas de Tesse in Montpellier, where he was awarded the French Baccalauréat, Mion went on to classes préparatoires at the Lycée Henri-IV, before integrating the École normale supérieure from which he graduated in 1988. Frédéric Mion then studied Public Affairs at Sciences Po, earning a Master's degree in 1992. After a brief period at Princeton University, he joined the École nationale d'administration (ENA), from which he graduated first in his class of the promotion Victor-Schœlcher in 1996.

=== Office ===
In January 2021, it was revealed he knew about child abuse for 2 years before it was published in a book that brought it to international attention. In February 2021, in light of new details emerging from the Duhamel affair, Mion resigned as Director of Sciences Po.
