= Pierre Paul Leroy-Beaulieu =

French economist

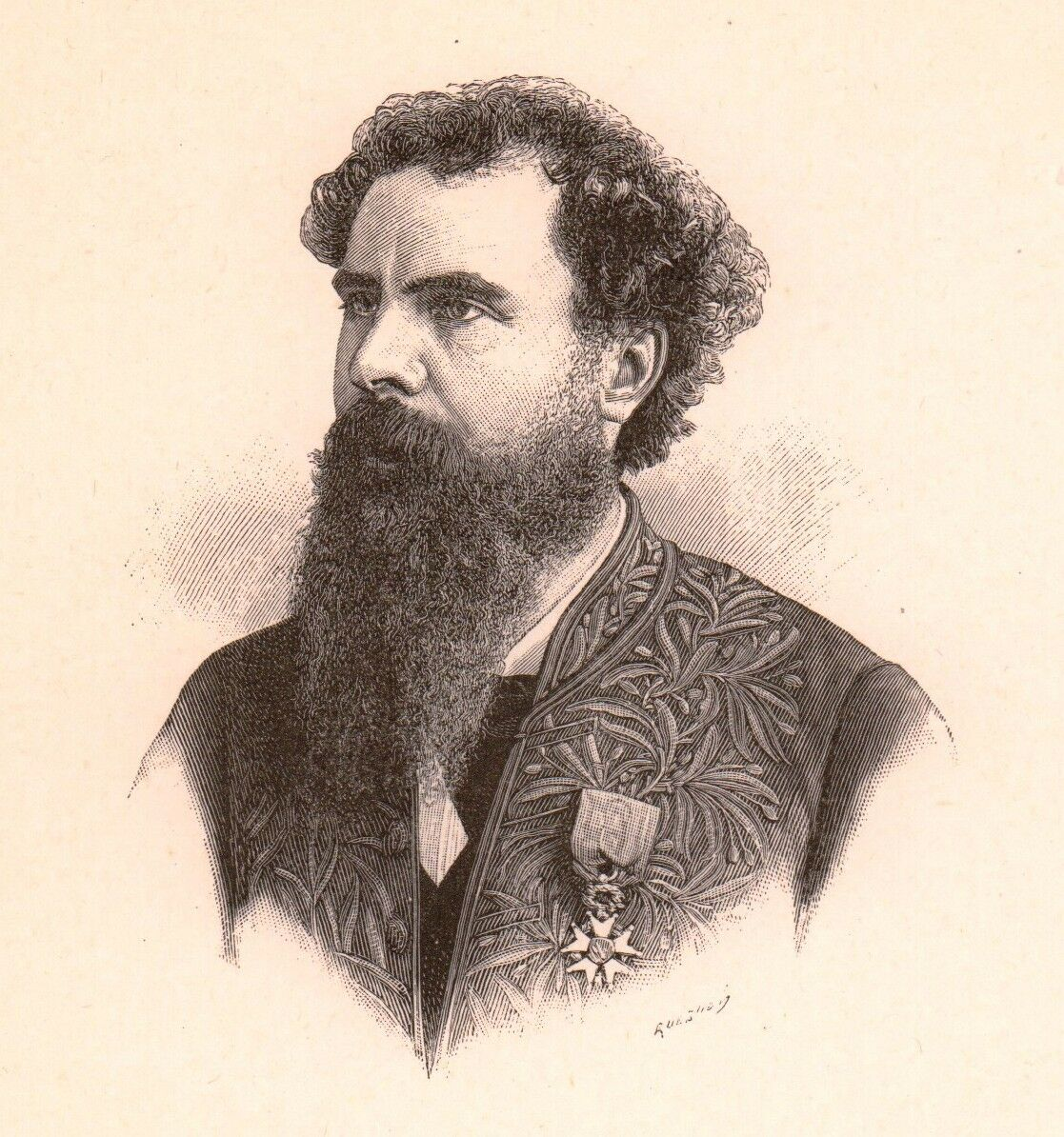
Pierre Paul Leroy-Beaulieu

Pierre Paul Leroy-Beaulieu (French: [pjɛʁ pɔl ləʁwa boljø]; 9 December 1843 – 9 December 1916) was a French economist.

== Biography ==
Leroy-Beaulieu was born in Saumur, Maine-et-Loire on 9 December 1843, and educated in Paris at the Lycée Condorcet and the École de Droit. He afterwards studied at Bonn and Berlin, and on his return to Paris began to write for Le Temps, Revue nationale and Revue contemporaine.

In 1867, he won a prize offered by the Academy of Moral and Political Sciences with an essay entitled L'Influence de état moral et intellectuel des populations ouvrières sur le taux des salaires. In 1870 he gained three prizes for essays on La Colonisation chez les peuples modernes, L'Administration en France et en Angleterre, and L'Impôt foncier et ses conséquences économiques. In 1872, Leroy-Beaulieu became professor of finance at the newly founded École Libre des Sciences Politiques, and in 1880 he succeeded his father-in-law, Michel Chevalier, in the chair of political economy in the Collège de France. In his last years, he was co-president of the Société d'économie politique from 1911 to 1916.

Several of his works have made their mark beyond the borders of his own country. Among them may be mentioned his Recherches économiques, historiques et statistiques sur les guerres contemporaines, a series of studies published between 1863 and 1869, in which he calculated the loss of men and capital caused by the great European conflicts.

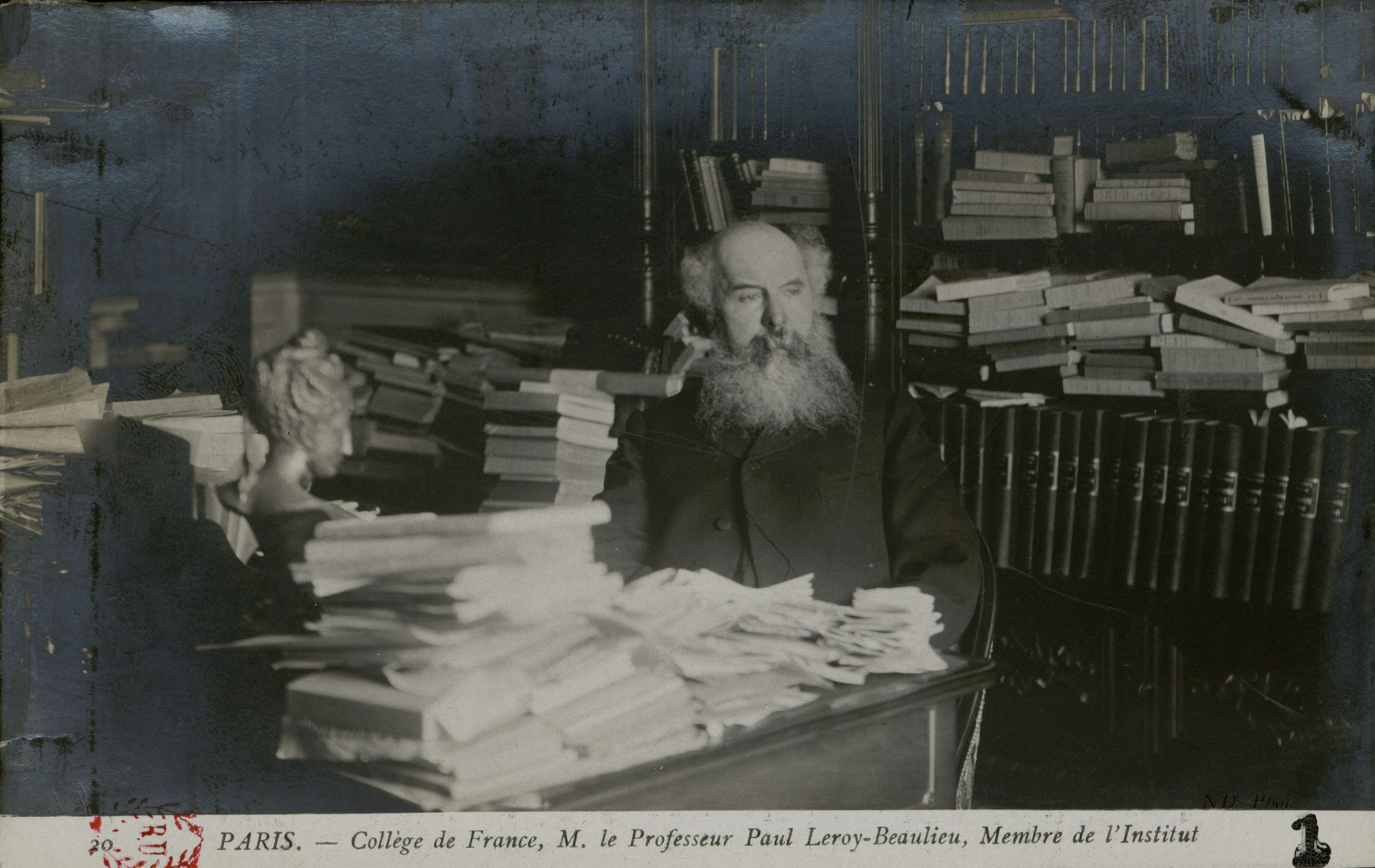
Collège de France. Professor Pierre Leroy-Beaulieu (Bibliothèque de La Sorbonne, NuBIS)

He also wrote La Question monnaie au dix-neuvieme siècle (1861), La Travail des femmes au dix-neuvième siècle (1873), Traité da la science des finances (1877), Essai sur la répartition des richesses (1882), Le collectivisme (1885), L'Algérie at la Tunisie (1888), Précis d'économie politique (1888), and L'Etat moderne et ses fonctions (1889). He also founded in 1873 the Économiste français, on the model of L'Economiste belge by Gustave de Molinari. Leroy-Beaulieu may be regarded as the leading representative in France of orthodox political economy, and the most pronounced opponent of protectionist and collectivist doctrines.

He was elected a member of the Royal Swedish Academy of Sciences in 1880. He was elected to the American Philosophical Society in 1881.

He died in 1916 in Paris.

He was the brother of Henri Jean Baptiste Anatole Leroy-Beaulieu (1842–1912), who was a publicist and historian.
