= Emmanuel Gaillard =

French lawyer and academic (1952–2021)

Emmanuel Gaillard (1 January 1952 – 1 April 2021) was a prominent practicing attorney, a leading authority on international commercial arbitration, and a law professor. He founded the international arbitration practice of the international law firm Shearman & Sterling before launching Gaillard Banifatemi Shelbaya Disputes, a global law firm dedicated to international arbitration, in 2021. He frequently acted as an arbitrator in international commercial or investment disputes.

== Education ==
Gaillard studied law at Panthéon-Assas University (D.E.A. in Private Law, 1976; D.E.A. in Criminal Law, 1977) and completed his PhD in law there in 1981. He obtained the Agrégation des Facultés de Droit in 1982. He was admitted to the Paris Bar in 1977.

== Career ==
His practice focused on international arbitration. He acted as counsel and arbitrator and was regularly ranked as a star performer in both categories.

In 1987, he founded the international arbitration practice of Shearman & Sterling. He was the firm’s Global Head of Disputes and Global International Arbitration Practice Group Leader for 33 years. In February 2021, along with Yas Banifatemi, Mohamed Shelbaya, Benjamin Siino, Ximena Herrera-Bernal, Maude Dubois, Coralie Darrigade and Daniel Reich, he launched Gaillard Banifatemi Shelbaya Disputes, a global law firm dedicated to the management of international disputes, with offices in London, New-York and Paris.

Gaillard became professor of law in 1982, after obtaining the agrégation in private law. Since then, Gaillard has taught at numerous universities: he was a professor of law at the Université Paris XII, he was a visiting professor at Harvard Law School (International Commercial Treaties, Comparative Private International Law) in 1984 and taught in the Geneva Master in International Dispute Settlement (MIDS), a program run by the University of Geneva and the Graduate Institute of International and Development Studies.

He co-founded and chaired the Arbitration Academy from 2010 to 2013, which was created to address the increasing demand for specialized teaching in international arbitration. The academy provides advanced Summer Courses in Paris to students and young practitioners interested in international arbitration. The curriculum is conceived by international arbitration academics and practitioners to cover all aspects of international arbitration, and the Courses are taught by the most renowned experts in the fields of international commercial arbitration and investment treaty arbitration.

In September 2012, Gaillard was appointed professor of law at Sciences Po Law School (SPLS), where he taught International Arbitration and Private International Law. In 2013, he was appointed On-site Program Director for New York University School of Law in Paris.

Gaillard taught at both Yale and Harvard law schools, and the Graduate Institute of International and Development Studies-based Geneva Center for International Dispute Settlement.

In 2014, he was appointed visiting professor at Yale Law School, where he taught international commercial arbitration together with Professor Michael Reisman and Dr. Yas Banifatemi.

From 2018 until his death in 2021, he had also been teaching international investment arbitration at Harvard Law School together with Dr. Banifatemi.

In 2019, Gaillard had been appointed to the Supreme Court of the People’s Republic of China’s International Experts Committee for a period of four years. Regarded as a prestigious appointment in China, the role included “providing advice and suggestions on the formulation of judicial interpretations and judicial policies of the Supreme People’s Court,” and, in so doing, contributing to the development of international arbitration in China.

== Theory and writings ==
His work experience contributes to elaborate legal theory and research on international arbitration law, especially on the subjects related to Investment Law and Arbitration (ICSID), Energy Charter Treaty (ECT) and Anti-Suits Injunctions. Many of his books and articles are cited as references on these topics (listed below).

He was also a proponent of the existence of an autonomous arbitral legal order, arising out of but distinct from the laws of national states.

He is often referred to as a primary author having written in all fields of international arbitration. He has commented on the ICSID case law since 1987 and published in 2004 the first book of commentary of ICSID case law. One of his most well-known works is his seminal treatise on international arbitration, 'Fouchard Gaillard Goldman on International Commercial Arbitration', published in 1999 and frequently referred to by practitioner academics and the national courts worldwide. In 2008, he published the first work on the theory of international arbitration, based on a course he taught in 2007 at The Hague Academy of International Law. The essay, published in French and later in English under the title “Legal Theory of International Arbitration”, was greeted by the international arbitration community as a ground-breaking and landmark work, for both the well-versed and newcomers to international arbitration. It is also available in Arabic, Chinese, Spanish, Hungarian, and Portuguese.

He has been referred to as an "intellectuel de droite" with a strong interest in sociology in the Revue du Crieur, a left-wing journal.

== Arbitrator ==
He acted as a chairman, sole arbitrator or member of the tribunal in numerous international arbitration proceedings (under the rules of the ICSID, ICC, LCIA, AAA, IACAC, etc.) as well as in ad hoc arbitration proceedings (UNCITRAL).

He was a chairman in NAFTA proceedings under UNCITRAL Rules. He also acted as co-arbitrator in other investment treaty arbitrations.

== Lawyer and counsel ==
Gaillard acted as a counsel in numerous international arbitration proceedings (mainly oil & gas, construction, international investment, environment and mergers & acquisitions matters). In 2005, he drew the attention of the world's legal community when he began representing the majority shareholders in Yukos Oil Company against the Russian Federation, for compensation up to US$50billion, the largest international arbitration ever. An award on jurisdiction was issued on November 30, 2009 in those proceedings, according to which the tribunal accepted that it has jurisdiction to hear the case pursuant to the provisions of the Energy Charter Treaty (ECT). In three awards dated 18 July 2014, the Arbitral Tribunal constituted in accordance with Article 26 of the Energy Charter Treaty (ECT) and the UNCITRAL Arbitration Rules under the auspices of the Permanent Court of Arbitration (PCA) ordered Russia to pay over US$50 billion in compensation for the indirect expropriation of OAO Yukos Oil Company (Yukos).

The main proceedings he worked on are the representation of the majority shareholders in Yukos Oil Company as Claimants in a series of three arbitrations against the Russian Federation, Wena Hotels against the Arab Republic of Egypt (ICSID Case No. ARB/98/4), The Slovak Republic as Respondent in an ICSID arbitration against Ceskoslovenska Obchodni Banka, A.S. (“CSOB”) (ICSID Case No. ARB/97/4), SGS Société Générale de Surveillance S.A. as Claimant in an ICSID arbitration against the Republic of the Philippines (ICSID Case No. ARB/02/6), SAUR International against the Argentine Republic (ICSID Case No. ARB/04/4), SGS Société Générale de Surveillance S.A. as Claimant in an ICSID arbitration in The Hague and Paris against the Islamic Republic of Pakistan (ICSID Case No. ARB/01/13), Plama Consortium Limited as Claimant in an ICSID arbitration in Paris against the Republic of Bulgaria (ICSID Case No. ARB/03/24).

== Death ==
Gaillard died from aortic dissection on April 1, 2021 at the age of 69 at a hospital in Paris.

== Works ==
=== Books ===
- Co-author, UNCITRAL Secretariat Guide on The New York Convention (Brill, 2017) (with G. Bermann)
- Co-author, Guide du Secrétariat de la CNUDCI sur la Convention pour la reconnaissance et l’exécution des sentences arbitrales étrangères (New York, 1958) (Pedone, 2017)
- Co-author, UNCITRAL Secretariat Guide on the Convention on the Recognition and Enforcement of Foreign Arbitral Awards (New York, 1958), 2016 Edition (UNCITRAL, Publishing and Library Section, United Nations Office at Vienna, 2016)
- Author, Legal Theory of International Arbitration, Martinus Nijhoff Publishers, May 2010, 202 pp.
- Author, La jurisprudence du CIRDI : Volume No. 2, Pedone, 2010
- Author, Aspects philosophiques du droit de l'arbitrage international, Martinus Nijhoff (Pocket Books of the Hague Academy of International Law / Les livres de poche de L'Académie de droit international de La Haye), 2008
- Author, La jurisprudence du CIRDI, Pedone, 2004.
- Co-author and co-editor, Fouchard Gaillard Goldman On International Commercial Arbitration, Kluwer, 1999 (and its French edition, Traité de l’arbitrage commercial international, Litec 1996).
- IAI Series
  - General editor, IAI International Arbitration Series No. 1, Annulment of ICSID Awards, JurisPublishing, 2004.
  - General editor, IAI International Arbitration Series No. 2, Anti-Suit Injunctions in International Arbitration, Juris Publishing, 2005.
  - General editor, IAI International Arbitration Series No. 3, Towards a Uniform International Arbitration Law?, Juris Publishing, 2005.
  - Editor with Jennifer Younan, IAI International Arbitration Series No. 4, State Entities in International Arbitration, Juris Publishing, 2008
  - Editor with Yas Banifatemi, IAI International Arbitration Series No. 5, Precedent in International Arbitration, Juris Publishing, 2008
  - Editor, IAI International Arbitration Series No. 6, Review of International Arbitral Awards, Juris Publishing, 2010
  - General editor with Frederic Bachand, IAI International Arbitration Series No. 7, Fifteen Years of NAFTA Chapter 11 Arbitration, Juris Publishing, 2011
  - General editor with Yas Banifatemi, IAI International Arbitration Series No. 8, Jurisdiction in Investment Treaty Arbitration, Juris Publishing, 2018
  - General editor with Hélène Ruiz-Fabri, IAI International Arbitration Series No. 11, EU Law and International Investment Arbitration, Juris Publishing, 2018
- Author, Le pouvoir en droit privé, Economica, 1985

=== Articles ===
- "Nouvelles réflexions sur la sociologie de l'arbitrage", in Procédures 2 (2020), pp. 35 (in French).
- "2018 Lalive Lecture: The Myth of Harmony in International Arbitration", in ICSID Review, Vol. 34, No. 3 (2019), pp. 553–568.
- “L’avenir des chambres commerciales internationales de Paris”, Revue Lamy Droit des Affaires (RLDA), Supplément au n° 152, October 2019, pp. 53–58 (article in French).
- “Note sous Avis 1/17 rendu le 30 avril 2019 par la Cour de justice de l'Union européenne”, Journal du droit international, July 2019, pp. 833–853.
- “Coordination or Chaos: Do the Principles of Comity, Lis Pendens and Res Judicata Apply to International Arbitration?” in the American Review of International Arbitration, March 2019.
- “The Emergence of Transnational Responses to Corruption in International Arbitration” in Arbitration International, March 2019.
- “Dialogue des ordres juridiques : ordre juridique arbitral et ordres juridiques étatiques" in Revue de l’arbitrage, September 2018.
- “Étendue et modalités du contrôle de l’absence de violation de l’ordre public international par les arbitres, Commentary on Cour d’appel de Paris (Pôle 1-Ch . 1), 10 avril 2018” in Revue de l’arbitrage, September 2018 (article in French).
- “L’affaire Achmea ou les conflits de logiques” in Revue critique de droit international privé, September 2018.
- “The US Courts’ Stance on Awards Set Aside at the Seat [“La Vision Américaine des Sentences Annulées au Siège”] (Note following the Pemex and Thai-Lao Lignite decisions of the US Court of Appeals for the 2d Circuit dated 2 August 2016 and 20 July 2017)", Revue de l’Arbitrage, December 2017 (article in French).
- “Cour de cassation, 1ère chambre civile, 13 septembre 2017, pourvoi numéro 16-25.657, Société Indagro” in Journal du droit international, December 2017.
- “La corruption saisie par les arbitres du commerce international” in Revue de l’arbitrage, September 2017.
- “L'apport de la pensée juridique française à l'arbitrage international” in Journal du droit international, n° 2, avril 2017.
- “Abuse of Process in International Arbitration” in ICSID Review 2016.
- “The Long March Towards a Jurisprudence Constante on the Notion of Investment: Salini v. Morocco, ICSID Case No. ARB/00/41,” Emmanuel Gaillard and Yas Banifatemi in Building International Investment Law: The First 50 Years of ICSID, 2015.
- “Sociologie de l’arbitrage”, in Journal du Droit International, Octobre-Novembre-Décembre 2015, n°4/2015, pp. 1089–1113.
- “Sociology of international arbitration” in Arbitration International, The Official Journal of the London Court of International Arbitration, 2015, 31, pp. 1–17
- “Le concours de procédures arbitrales dans le droit des investissements”, in Mélanges en l'honneur du Professeur Pierre Mayer, LGDJ Lextenso Editions, Octobre 2015, pp. 225–239.
- “Algeria” in African Upstream Oil and Gas, A Practical Guide to the Law and Regulation, December 2014.
- “Transcending National Legal Orders for International Arbitration”, in International Council for Commercial Arbitration, ICCA Congress Series no. 17, p. 371 (2013).
- “Rapport de synthèse : l’argent de l’arbitrage”, in L’argent dans l’arbitrage, Lextenso Editions, p. 191 (2013).
- "L’arbitrage international et le droit de l’Union européenne : un dialogue constructif ou une collision inévitable ? ”, in Cahiers de droit de l’entreprise, N° 5, p. 9 (2013).
- "International Arbitration as a Transnational System of Justice", in Arbitration - The Next Fifty Years, ICCA Congress Series No. 16, 2012, pp. 66–73.
- “Les principes fondamentaux du nouveau droit français de l’arbitrage”, in Le nouveau droit français de l’arbitrage (Dir. Thomas Clay), p. 57 (2011).
- “Commentaire analytique du décret du 13 janvier 2011 portant réforme du droit français de l’arbitrage”, in Les cahiers de l’arbitrage, p. 263 (2011-2).
- “L’Union européenne et la régression de la règle de droit”, in La semaine juridique – Edition générale, n° 13, p. 361 (2011).
- "Réflexions sur le nouveau droit français de l'arbitrage international", in Rivista dell'Arbitrato, n.4/2011, pp. 525–556 (in French).
- "L’arbitrage, une forme de justice ordinaire" in La Tribune, May 24, 2011, p. 27 (in French).
- "After Morrison: The Case for a New Hague Convention on The Law Applicable to Securities Frauds", in 5.1 Dispute Resolution International, May 2011.
- "Menaces sur la protection des investissements en Europe", in Option Droit et Affaires, May 11, 2011.
- "General Principles of Law in International Commercial Arbitration—Challenging the Myths", in World Arbitration & Mediation Review (WAMR), Vol. 5, No. 2 (2011).
- "France Adopts New Law On Arbitration," New York Law Journal, Jan. 24, 2011.
- “Advocacy in Practice: The Use of Parallel Proceedings”, in The Art of Advocacy in International Arbitration 173 (R.D. Bishop 2nd ed. 2010)(co-author).
- “Three philosophies of International Arbitration”, in Contemporary Issues in International Arbitration and Mediation The Fordham Papers Volume 3 2009, Martinus Nijhoff Publishers, 2010, p. 305.
- “The Energy Charter Treaty”, in Arbitration under International Investment Agreements, OUP, 2010, p. 37 (co-author).
- "L'ordre juridique arbitral : réalité, utilité et spécificité", Conférence commémorative John E.C. Brierley, in McGill Law Journal, vol. 55, 2010.
- "The Representations of International Arbitration", in Journal of International Dispute Settlement, 2010, pp. 1–11.
- Masochisme français - Le Tribunal des conflits torpille le droit français de l'arbitrage, JCP la Semaine Juridique, édition générale, n.21, 24 mai 2010.
- Le Traité sur la Charte de l’énergie reste un outil juridique essentiel, Les Echos, 25 février 2010.
- “The Urgency of Not Revising the New York Convention” in ICCA Congress Series No 14, 50 Years of the New York Convention. ICCA International Arbitration Conference, 689 (2009).
- “Russia cannot walk away from its legal obligations”, Financial Times, August 18, 2009.
- “Identify or define? Reflections on the evolution of the concept of investment in ICSID practice”, in International Investment Law for the 21st Century. Essays in Honour of Christoph Schreuer, Oxford University Press, 403 (2009).
- “Rencontre avec Emmanuel Gaillard autour de la sortie de son ouvrage : « Aspects philosophiques du droit de l'arbitrage international »”, Juriste d’Entreprise Magazine (Entretien Philippe Coen), 3 (juillet 2009), P.14-15.
- “’Biwater’, Classic Investment Bases: Input Risk, Duration”, New York Law Journal, December 31, 2008.
- “Negative Effect of Competence-Competence: The Rule of Priority in Favor of the Arbitrators” in Enforcement of Arbitration Agreements and International Arbitral Awards: The New York Convention in Practice (E. Gaillard, D. Di Pietro, Editors) Cameron May, 257 (2008).
- “Effectiveness of Arbitral Awards, State Immunity from Execution and Autonomy of State Entities: Three Incompatible Principles”, in IAI Series on International Arbitration No. 4, State Entities in International Arbitration, 179 (2008).
- “Anti-Arbitration Trends in Latin America”, New York Law Journal, June 5, 2008.
- “Centre international pour le règlement des différends relatifs aux investissements (CIRDI), Chronique des sentences arbitrales”, J.D.I., 2008.311.
- “La jurisprudence de la Cour de cassation en matière d’arbitrage international”, Rev. arb., 2007.697.
- “Souveraineté et autonomie : réflexions sur les représentations de l’arbitrage international”, J.D.I., 2007.1163.
- “La reconnaissance, en droit suisse, de la seconde moitié du principe d’effet négatif de la compétence-compétence”, in Global Reflections on International Law, Commerce and Dispute Resolution, Liber Amicorum in Honour of Robert Briner, ICC Publishing, 2005, p. 311.
- “Il est interdit d’interdire: réflexions sur l’utilisation des anti-suit injunctions dans l’arbitrage commercial international”, Rev. arb., 2004.47.
- “L’interférence des juridictions du siège dans le déroulement de l’arbitrage”, in Liber Amicorum Claude Reymond, 2004, p. 83.
- “L’arbitrage sur le fondement des traités de protection des investissements”, Rev.arb., 2003.853.
- “L’arbitrage international : la valeur patrimoniale de la clause d’arbitrage”, Réalités industrielles (Annales des mines), août 1999, p. 36.
- “L’effet négatif de la compétence-compétence”, in Etudes de procédure et d’arbitrage en l’honneur de Jean-François Poudret, 1999, p. 387.
- “L’exécution des sentences annulées dans leur pays d’origine”, J.D.I., 1998.645.
- “Trente ans de Lex mercatoria. Pour une application sélective de la méthode des principes généraux du droit”, J.D.I., 1995.5.
- “La distinction des principes généraux du droit et des usages du commerce international”, in Etudes offertes à Pierre Bellet, 1991, p. 203.
- “The Representations of International Arbitration”, New York Law Journal, October 4, 2007.
- “The denunciation of the ICSID Convention”, New York Law Journal, June 26, 2007.
- “Extent of Court Review of Public Policy”, New York Law Journal, April 5, 2007.
- “ICC Pre-Arbitral Referee: A Procedure Into Its Stride”, New York Law Journal, October 5, 2006.
- “Prima Facie Review of Existence, Validity of Arbitration Agreement”, New York Law Journal, December 1, 2005.
- “Anti-Suit Injunctions Issued by Arbitrators” in ICCA Congress Series No 13, International Arbitration 2006: Back to Basics? Kluwer 2007.235.
- “Reflections on the Use of Anti-Suit Injunctions in International Arbitration” in Pervasive Problems in International Arbitration (Kluwer, 2006, Loukas A. Mistelis and Julian D.M. Lew eds.), p. 201.
- “Investment and Investors Covered by the Energy Charter Treaty” in Investment Arbitration and the Energy Charter Treaty (Juris Publishing, 2006C. Ribeiro ed., 2006), p. 54.
- “Investment Treaty Arbitration and Jurisdiction over Contractual Claims. The SGS Cases Considered” in International Investment Law and Arbitration: Leading cases from the ICSID, NAFTA, Bilateral Treaties and Customary International Law (Cameron May: London, 2005, T. Weiler, ed.), p. 325.
- “The Extent of Review of the Applicable Law in Investment Treaty Arbitration”, in IAI Series on International Arbitration No. 1, Annulment of ICSID Awards 223 (2004).
- “The Meaning of ‘and’ in Article 42 (1), Second Sentence, of the Washington Convention: The Role of International Law in the ICSID Choice of Law Process”, 18 ICSID Review 375 (2003) (co-author).
- “The ICC Pre-Arbitral Referee. First Practical Experiences”, Arbitration International, volume 20, No. 1, 2004, p. 13.
- “The Role of the Arbitrator in Determining the Applicable Law”, in The Leading Arbitrators’ Guide to International Arbitration (L.-W. Newman, R.D. Hill, Editors), Juris Publishing, 2004, p. 185.
- “International Organisations and Immunity From Jurisdiction: To Restrict or To Bypass”, 51 International Comparative Law Quarterly 1 (2002) (co-author).
- “Transnational Law: A Legal System or a Method of Decision Making?”, 17 Arbitration International 59 (2001). (Also published in K.P. Berger (ed.), The Practice of Transnational Law, 53-65, Kluwer, 2001).
- “Use of General Principles of International Law in International Long-Term Contracts”, International Business Lawyer, May 1999, vol. 27, n°5, p. 214.
- “The Enforcement of Awards Set Aside in the Country of Origin”, 14 ICSID Review 16 (1999).
- “Thirty Years of Lex Mercatoria: Towards the Selective Application of Transnational Rules”, 10 ICSID Review 208 (1995).

=== Published Lectures and Interviews ===
- Seven Dirty Tricks to Disrupt Arbitral Proceedings and the Responses of International Arbitration Law, 2020 Annual International Commercial Arbitration Lecture (webinar), American University Washington College of Law, Center on International Commercial Arbitration (event sponsored by Arnold Porter), September 24, 2020
- Interview of Prof. Emmanuel Gaillard in "Conversation with Neil" Series, Neil Kaplan, virtually, in Melbourne, with Chiann Bao, June 25, 2020.
- Will COVID-19 Revolutionize Arbitration? What's Next for Business and Arbitration?, TGS Baltic Webinar, May 11, 2020.
- Emmanuel Gaillard and Antoine Garapon, Conversation: "Legal Causality v. Algorithmic Correlation", Conference "Universal Artificial Intelligence: Levelling the Playing Field" - Debate III, Paris, 15 November 2019 (in French).
- "The influence of French legal thinking on the development of arbitration law", International Arbitration Institute (IAI), with the participation of Prof. Emmanuel Gaillard, Paris Arbitration Week 2019, Paris, Palais de justice, April 4, 2019.
- SIAC-CIArb Debate (Motion: This House Believes that the Practice of Party-Appointed Arbitrators is a Moral Hazard in International Arbitration and Should Be Abolished), with the participation of Prof. Emmanuel Gaillard ("against the motion"), June 8, 2017.
- “The Arbitral Legal Order”, Public debate between Lord Mance and Emmanuel Gaillard, moderated by French judge Dominique Hascher in the Grande Chambre of the French Court of Cassation in Paris, 16 December 2016 (Report written by Rudolf Simone-Pont, “Le grand débat: Lord Mance and Gaillard clash in Paris”, GAR vol. 12, 1(2017), pp. 22–26)
- Press conference for international media on Historic Award in the Yukos Majority Shareholders Arbitration: USD 50 billion, July 28, 2014.
- "L'avocat arbitre", Conference with Georges-Albert Dal (UCL), Emmanuel Gaillard (Science-Po Paris) and Jean-Baptiste Racine (Nice-Sophia Antipolis), The Perelman Centre for Legal Philosophy of the Free University of Brussels (ULB), March 20, 2014 (in French)
- 2012 Opening Speech by Emmanuel Gaillard (Arbitration Academy), 2012 Session of the Arbitration Academy, Thomson Reuters Conference Center, Paris, July 2012.
- Interview with Emmanuel Gaillard, International Bar Association, IBA Annual Conference, Vancouver, October 2010.
- The Role of International Law in Investment Arbitration in the Lecture Series of the United Nations Audiovisual Library of International Law

Extensive bibliography of publications.
