= List of énarques =

This is a list of énarques. Énarque is the name given to the alumni of the École nationale d'administration (National School of Public Administration) in France. The ENA was founded in 1945 and as the program is two years long, the first class graduated in 1947.

== Politics ==
=== Heads of States and Governments ===
- Valéry Giscard d'Estaing (class of 1951), President of the French Republic
- Édouard Balladur (class of 1957), French Prime Minister
- Michel Rocard (class of 1958), French Prime Minister
- Jacques Chirac (class of 1959), President of the French Republic
- Nicéphore Soglo (class of 1962), President of Benin
- André Ntsatouabantou Milongo (class of 1964), Prime Minister of the Republic of Congo
- Edem Kodjo (class of 1964), Prime Minister of Togo
- Lionel Jospin (class of 1965), Prime Minister of France
- Jean-Paul Proust (class of 1966), Minister of State of Monaco
- Patrick Leclercq (class of 1966), Minister of State of Monaco
- Paul Dijoud (class of 1966), Minister of State of Monaco
- Alain Juppé (class of 1972), Prime Minister of France
- Laurent Fabius (class of 1973), Prime Minister of France
- Adly Mansour (class of 1977), President of Egypt
- Dominique de Villepin (class of 1980), Prime Minister of France
- François Hollande (class of 1980), President of the French Republic
- Jean Castex (class of 1991), Prime Minister of France
- Édouard Philippe (class of 1997), Prime Minister of France
- Emmanuel Macron (class of 2004), President of the French Republic

=== International Organizations ===
- François-Xavier Ortoli (class of 1947), President of the European Commission
- René Maheu (class of 1958), Director General of UNESCO
- Jacques de Larosière (class of 1958), managing director of the IMF, President of the European Bank for Reconstruction and Development
- Michel Camdessus (class of 1960), managing director of the IMF
- Jean-Paul Costa (class of 1966), President of the European Court of Human Rights
- Jean-Claude Trichet (class of 1971), President of the European Central Bank
- Pierre de Boissieu (class of 1971), Secretary-General of the Council of the European Union
- Pascal Lamy (class of 1975), Director General of the World Trade Organization
- Ronny Abraham (class of 1978), President of the International Court of Justice

=== Ministers and Secretaries of State ===
- Alain Peyrefitte (class of 1947), French Minister of Justice
- Michel Poniatowski (class of 1948), French Minister of Interior
- Michel Jobert (class of 1948), French Minister of Foreign Affairs
- Claude Cheysson (class of 1948), French Minister of Foreign Affairs
- Jean-Pierre Fourcade (class of 1954), French Minister of Finance
- Nicole Questiaux (class of 1955), French Minister of Solidarity
- Jean François Poncet (class of 1955), French Minister of Foreign Affairs
- Jean-Bernard Raimond (class of 1956), French Minister of Foreign Affairs
- Philippe Malaud (class of 1956), French Minister of Information
- Bernard Stasi (class of 1959), French Minister of Overseas
- Pierre Joxe (class of 1962), French Minister of Interior
- Jean-Philippe Lecat (class of 1963), French Minister of Culture
- Jacques Toubon (class of 1965), French Minister of Justice
- Jean-Pierre Chevènement (class of 1965), French Minister of the Interior
- Hervé de Charette (class of 1966), French Minister of Foreign Affairs
- Catherine Tasca (class of 1967), French Minister of Culture
- Alain Lamassoure (class of 1968), French Minister of Budget
- Michel Audet (class of 1968), Minister of Finance of Québec
- Philippe Séguin (class of 1970), French Minister of Social Affairs
- Alain Richard (class of 1971), French Minister of Defence
- Claude Guéant (class of 1971), French Minister of Interior
- François d'Aubert (class of 1971), French Minister of Research
- Dominique Perben (class of 1972), French Minister of Justice
- François Léotard (class of 1973), French Minister of Culture
- Gérard Longuet (class of 1973), French Minister of Defence
- Hubert Védrine (class of 1974), French Minister of Foreign Affairs
- Anne-Marie Idrac (class of 1974), French Minister of Transports
- Élisabeth Guigou (class of 1974), French Minister of Justice
- Martine Aubry (class of 1975), French Minister of Employment
- Paul Masseron (class of 1976), Minister of the principality of Monaco
- Michel Sapin (class of 1980), French Minister of Finance
- Ségolène Royal (class of 1980), French Minister of Ecology
- Renaud Donnedieu de Vabres (class of 1980), French Minister of Culture
- François Goulard (class of 1981), French Minister of Research
- Ridha Grira (class of 1982), Tunisian Minister of Defence
- Catherine Colonna (class of 1983), French Minister of European Affairs
- Pierre Moscovici (class of 1984), French Minister of Finance
- Philippe Bas (class of 1984), French Minister of Health
- Renaud Dutreil (class of 1989), French Minister of Civil Service
- Jean-François Copé (class of 1989), French Minister of Budget
- Valérie Pécresse (class of 1992), French Minister of Higher Education
- Bruno Le Maire (class of 1998), French Minister of Agriculture
- Chantal Jouanno (class of 1999), French Minister of Sports
- Fleur Pellerin (class of 2000), French Minister of Culture
- Nicolas Kazadi (class of 2000), Minister of Finance and Ambassador-at-large for the Democratic Republic of Congo
- Laurent Wauquiez (class of 2001), French Minister of Higher Education
- Clément Beaune (class of 2009), French Secretary of State for European affairs

=== Other political figures ===
- Yves Guéna (class of 1947), President of the Constitutional Council
- Pascal Arrighi (class of 1948), French MP
- Jean-François Deniau (class of 1952), French MP
- Michel Albert (class of 1956), Permanent Secretary of the Académie des Sciences Morales et Politiques
- Charline Avenel (class of 2004), Rector of Versailles Academy
- Robert Miguet (class of 1958), prefect
- Jean-Pierre Soisson (class of 1961), French MP
- Yann Gaillard (class of 1961), French MP
- Renaud Denoix de Saint Marc (class of 1964), Vice President of the Conseil d'État
- Ernest-Antoine Seillière (class of 1965), President of the MEDEF
- Josselin de Rohan (class of 1965), French MP
- François Bujon de l'Estang (class of 1966), Ambassador of France to the United States
- Antoine Rufenacht (class of 1968), Mayor of Le Havre
- René Couanau (class of 1968), French MP
- Pierre Brochand (class of 1968), Director of the DGSE
- Jean-Claude Guibal (class of 1969), French MP
- Jacques Cheminade (class of 1969), French political activist
- Daniel Jouanneau (class of 1970), Ambassador of France to Mozambique, Swaziland, Lesotho, Lebanon, Canada and Pakistan
- Pierre Steinmetz (class of 1970), member of the Constitutional Council of France
- Jean-Paul Huchon (class of 1971), President of Île de France
- Jean-Louis Bianco (class of 1971), French MP
- Dominique Souchet (class of 1972), French MP
- Christian Frémont (class of 1972), Chief of staff of Nicolas Sarkozy
- Jean-Marc de La Sablière (class of 1973), Ambassador of France to Italy
- Rachid Bladehane, Algerian politician
- Yvan Blot (class of 1973), European MP
- Didier Quentin (class of 1974), French MP
- Philippe Marini (class of 1974), French MP
- Henry de Lesquen (class of 1974), President of the Club de l'Horloge
- Jean-Yves Le Gallou (class of 1974), European MP
- Jean-Pierre Landau (class of 1974), Second Deputy Governor of the Banque de France
- Michel Diefenbacher (class of 1974), French MP
- Bernadette Malgorn (class of 1975), prefect
- Olivier Dutheillet de Lamothe (class of 1975), member of the Constitutional Council of France
- Bernard Bajolet (class of 1975), Director of the DGSE
- Christian Noyer (class of 1976), Governor of the Banque de France
- Régis Guyot (class of 1976), prefect
- Jean-Marie Guéhenno (class of 1976), CEO of International Crisis Group
- Gilles Carrez (class of 1976), French MP
- Bernard Bonnet (class of 1976), prefect
- Pierre Vimont (class of 1977), Ambassador of France to the United States of America
- Jean-Marc Sauvé (class of 1977), Vice President of the Council of State
- Jean-François Mancel (class of 1977), French MP
- Philippe de Villiers (class of 1978), European MP
- Bruno Racine (class of 1979), President of the Bibliothèque nationale de France
- Charles de Courson (class of 1979), French MP
- Jean-Louis Bourlanges (class of 1979), European MP
- Jean-Maurice Ripert (class of 1980), Permanent Representative of France to the United Nations
- Pierre-René Lemas (class of 1980), Chief of staff of François Hollande
- Stanislas Lefebvre de Laboulaye (class of 1980), Ambassador Extraordinary and Plenipotentiary of the Republic of France to the Holy See
- Jean-Pierre Jouyet (class of 1980), Chief of staff of François Hollande
- Sylvie Hubac (class of 1980), Chief of staff of François Hollande
- Claire Bazy-Malaurie (class of 1980), member of the Constitutional Council of France
- Raymond-Max Aubert (class of 1980), French MP
- Richard Samuel (class of 1981), prefect
- Paul Giacobbi (class of 1982), French MP
- Paul-Marie Coûteaux (class of 1982), European MP
- Gérard Araud (class of 1982), Ambassador of France to the United States
- Marc Le Fur (class of 1983), French MP
- Bernard Émié (class of 1983), Ambassador of France to the United Kingdom
- Yves Détraigne (class of 1983), French MP
- Adolphe Colrat (class of 1983), prefect
- Patrick Strzoda (class of 1983), Emmanuel Macron's chief of staff, prefect
- François Villeroy de Galhau (class of 1984), Governor of the Banque de France
- Abderezak Sebgag, Algerian Minister of Youth and Sports
- Jean-Michel Severino (class of 1984), Director of the Agence Française de Développement
- Jean Mallot (class of 1984), French MP
- François Asselineau (class of 1985), General inspector of finances and founder of UPR
- Xavier Musca (class of 1985), Chief of staff of Nicolas Sarkozy
- Hervé Gaymard (class of 1986), French MP
- Jean-Christophe Potton (class of 1987), Ambassador of France to Uruguay
- Henri Plagnol (class of 1987), French MP
- Christian Paul (class of 1987), French MP
- Gaëtan Gorce (class of 1987), French MP
- Philippe Galli (class of 1988), prefect
- Sylvie Goulard (class of 1989), European MP
- Nicolas Dupont-Aignan (class of 1989), French MP
- Martin Hirsch (class of 1990), Head of Emmaüs France
- Alain Seban (class of 1991), President of the Pompidou Center
- Frédéric Salat-Baroux (class of 1991), Chief of staff of Jacques Chirac
- Anne Paugam (class of 1993), Director of the Agence Française de Développement
- Richard Didier (class of 1994), prefect
- Emmanuelle Mignon (class of 1995), cabinet secretary for Nicolas Sarkozy
- Jérôme Guedj (class of 1996), French MP
- Olivier Ferrand (class of 1997), French MP
- Guillaume Larrivé (class of 2002), French MP
- Julien Anfruns (class of 2002), Member of the Council of State of France
- Luis Vassy (class of 2004), ambassador of France to the Netherlands; Director of Sciences Po
- Florian Philippot (class of 2009), European MP

== Business ==
- Michel Pébereau (class of 1967), CEO of BNP Paribas
- Jean Drucker (class of 1968), CEO of M6
- Hélie de Noailles (class of 1969), Director of Lazard
- Louis Schweitzer (class of 1970), Chairman of Renault
- Marc Ladreit de Lacharrière (class of 1970), CEO of FIMALAC
- Michel Bon (class of 1971), CEO of Carrefour
- Jean-Cyril Spinetta (class of 1972), CEO of Air France-KLM
- Jean-Louis Gergorin (class of 1972), Executive Vice President of EADS
- Louis Gallois (class of 1972), CEO of EADS
- Jean-Paul Cluzel (class of 1972), CEO of Radio France
- Alain Minc (class of 1975), business and political advisor
- Serge Weinberg (class of 1976), Chairman of Weinberg Capital Partners
- Yves-Thibault de Silguy (class of 1976), Executive Vice President of Vinci
- Michel de Rosen (class of 1976), CEO of Eutelsat
- Baudouin Prot (class of 1976), CEO of BNP Paribas
- Jean-Charles Naouri (class of 1976), CEO of Casino
- Gérard Mestrallet (class of 1978), CEO of GDF SUEZ
- Paul Hermelin (class of 1978), CEO of Capgemini
- Henri de Castries (class of 1980), CEO of AXA
- Jean-Jacques Augier (class of 1980), CEO of Taxis G7
- Philippe Crouzet (class of 1981), Chairman of Vallourec
- Jean-Marie Messier (class of 1982), Chairman of Vivendi
- Pierre-André de Chalendar (class of 1983), CEO of Saint Gobain
- Walter Butler (class of 1983), Founder of Butler Capital Partners
- Philippe Wahl (class of 1984), CEO of La Poste
- Guillaume Pepy (class of 1984), CEO of SNCF
- Philippe Capron (class of 1985), CFO of Veolia
- Augustin de Romanet de Beaune (class of 1986), CEO of Aéroports de Paris
- Stéphane Richard (class of 1987), CEO of Orange
- Frédéric Oudéa (class of 1987), CEO of Société Générale
- Bruno Deletré (class of 1987), CEO of Crédit Foncier de France
- Nicolas Dufourcq (class of 1988), CEO of the Public Bank of Investment
- Claire Dorland-Clauzel (class of 1988), Executive Vice President of Michelin
- François Pérol (class of 1990), CEO of BPCE
- Matthieu Pigasse (class of 1994), Deputy CEO of Lazard
- Pascal Demurger (class of 1996), director general of MAIF
- Alexandre Bompard (class of 1999), CEO of Fnac
- Mathias Vicherat (class of 2004), secretary general of Danone; Director of Sciences Po

== Academics ==
- Gabriel de Broglie (class of 1960), historian
- Pierre-Jean Rémy (class of 1963), member of the Académie française
- Guy Sorman (class of 1969), writer
- Françoise Chandernagor (class of 1969), member of the Académie Goncourt
- Jacques Attali (class of 1970), economist
- José Frèches (class of 1978), novelist
- Jean-Michel Gaillard (class of 1979), writer
- François Sureau (class of 1981), writer
- Andreas Kaplan (class of 2007), professor
- Patrick Levaye (class of 1985), writer
- Marc Lambron (class of 1985), writer
- Richard Descoings (class of 1985), Director of Sciences Po
- Guillaume Dustan (class of 1991), writer
- Agnès Clancier (class of 1995), writer
- Luis Vassy (class of 2004), Director of Sciences Po
- Mathias Vicherat (class of 2004), Director of Sciences Po

== Other ==
- Jacques Frémontier (born surname Friedman; 1930–2020), French journalist and television producer
- Emmanuel Glaser (class of 1992), French Lawyer

== Honorary "Promotions" ==
(Section translated from fr: Liste d'élèves de l'École nationale d'administration)

Since the creation of the National School of Administration, the tradition has been that students at the start of their schooling, often during a seminar or vacation, vote to determine the name of their promotion. It is a tradition that has not been official since 1964. The procedure is decided in several rounds of voting, eccentric and folkloric initial proposals are common. This is often named after the name of a famous personality or a concept, an organization or a date. The first years were named after the values of the Resistance, a third after politicians, another third after historians and men of letters.

From 2022, the ENA has been replaced by the National Institute of Public Service. The promotion name designation method is still maintained.

The names of all the promotions of the ENA and then the INSP appear in the reception halls of the Paris and Strasbourg sites of the INSP.

The names of the successive promotions are :

- 1946-1947 : France-Combatante
- 1946-1948 : French Union
- 1947-1948 : Croix-de-Lorraine
- 1947-1949 : United Nations
- 1948-1949 : Jean-Moulin
- 1948-1950 : Forty-Eight
- 1949-1951 : Europe
- 1950-1952 : Jean-Giraudoux
- 1951-1953 : Paul-Cambon
- 1952-1954 : Félix-Éboué
- 1953-1955 : Albert-Thomas
- 1954-1956 : Guy Desbos (d)
- 1955-1957 : France-Africa
- 1956-1958 : Dix-Huit-Juin (June 18)
- 1957-1959 : Vauban
- 1958-1960 : Alexis-de-Tocqueville
- 1959-1961 : Lazare-Carnot
- 1960-1962 : Albert-Camus
- 1961-1963 : Saint-Just
- 1962-1964 : Blaise-Pascal
- 1963-1965 : Stendhal
- 1964-1966 : Montesquieu
- 1965-1967 : Marcel-Proust
- 1966-1968 : Turgot
- 1967-1969 : Jean-Jaurès
- 1968-1970 : Robespierre
- 1969-1971 : Thomas-More
- 1970-1972 : Charles-de-Gaulle
- 1971-1973 : François-Rabelais
- 1972-1974 : Simone-Weil
- 1973-1975 : Léon-Blum
- 1974-1976 : Guernica
- 1975-1977 : André-Malraux
- 1976-1978 : Pierre-Mendès-France
- 1977-1979 : Michel-de-L’Hospital
- 1978-1980 : Voltaire
- 1979-1981 : Human rights
- 1980-1982 : Henri-François-d’Aguesseau
- 1981-1983 : Solidarity
- 1982-1984 : Louise-Michel
- 1983-1985 : Leonardo da Vinci
- 1984-1986 : Denis-Diderot
- 1985-1987 : Fernand-Braudel
- 1986-1988 : Michel-de-Montaigne
- 1987-1989 : Liberty-Equality-Fraternity
- 1988-1990 : Jean-Monnet
- 1989-1991 : Victor-Hugo
- 1990-1992 : Condorcet
- 1991-1993 : Léon-Gambetta
- 1992-1994 : Antoine-de-Saint-Exupéry
- 1993-1995 : René-Char
- 1994-1996 : Victor-Schœlcher
- 1995-1997 : Marc-Bloch
- 1996-1998 : Valmy
- 1997-1999 : Cyrano-de-Bergerac
- 1998-2000 : Averroes
- 1999-2001 : Nelson-Mandela
- 2000-2002 : Copernicus
- 2001-2003 : René-Cassin
- 2002-2004 : Léopold-Sédar-Senghor
- 2003-2005 : Romain-Gary
- 2004-2006 : Simone-Veil
- 2005-2007 : Republic
- 2006-2008 : Aristide-Briand
- 2007-2009 : Willy-Brandt
- 2008-2010 : Émile-Zola
- 2009-2011 : Robert-Badinter
- 2010-2011 : Jean-Jacques-Rousseau
- 2011-2012 : Marie-Curie
- 2012-2013 : Jean-Zay
- 2013-2014 : Jean-de-La-Fontaine
- 2014-2015 : Winston-Churchill
- 2015-2016 : George-Orwell
- 2016-2017 : Louise-Weiss
- 2017-2018 : Georges-Clemenceau
- 2018-2019 : Molière
- 2019-2020 : Hannah-Arendt
- 2020-2021 : Aimé-Césaire
- 2021-2022 : Germaine-Tillion
- 2022-2023 : Guillaume-Apollinaire
- 2023-2024 : Joséphine Baker
- 2024-2026 : Paul-Émile Victor

== See also ==
- École nationale d'administration
- Grandes écoles
- Education in France
- France
