= Prefect of Ain =

Prefect of the Department of Ain
- Préfet du Département de l'Ain (French)
- Incumbent; Arnaud Cochet since 23 August 2016
- Style: Mr. Prefect
- Seat: Hôtel de préfecture, Bourg-en-Bresse, Ain
- Appointer: President of the French Republic
- Term length: At the Cabinet's discretion
- Formation: 2 March 1800
- First holder: Jacques Hyacinthe Fabry
- Deputy: Secretary General of the prefecture
- Salary: 5,000 - 6,000€ monthly
- Website: Official website

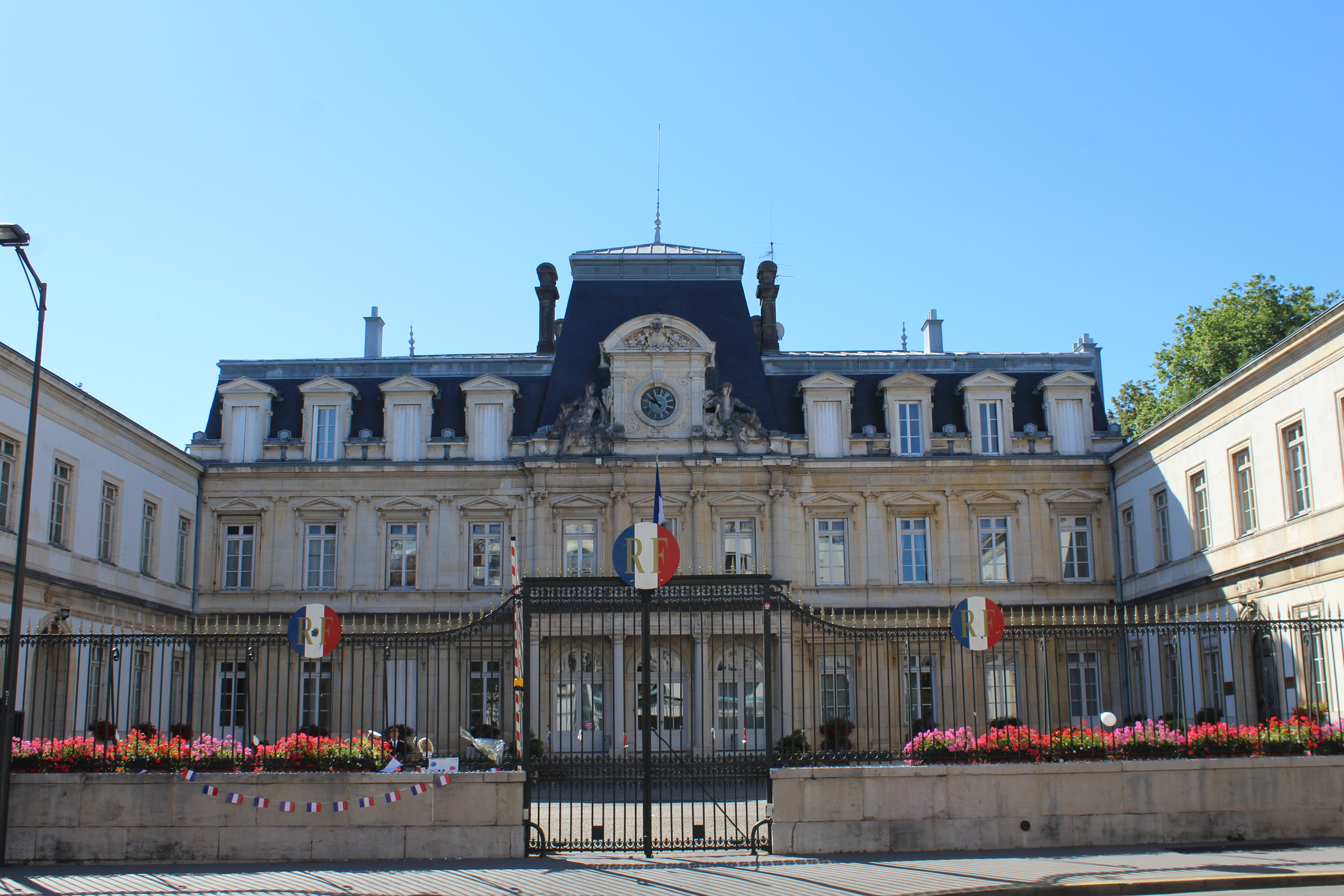
Prefecture building, seat and residence of the Prefect

The Prefect of Ain is the highest state representative in the department of Ain on the East border of France. Its seat is in Bourg-en-Bresse.

The office was created in 1800 under Napoléon Bonaparte, then First Consul of the French First Republic, to ensure the representation of the state in the departements and the full application of the national law. Under the Fifth Republic, the powers of a Prefect are governed by article 72 of the Constitution, completed by Law 1992-125 and Decrees 2004-374 and 2010–146.

== List of Prefects of Ain ==
Term start	Term end	Office holder
French First Republic
2 March 1800	10 March 1800	Jacques Hyacinthe Fabry
10 March 1800	23 July 1802	Jean Antoine Ozun
23 July 1802	1 February 1805	Patrice Charles Gislain de Coninck
French First Empire
1 February 1805	12 February 1810	Joseph Aurèle Charles de Bossi
12 February 1810	10 June 1814	Léonard Philippe Rivet
10 June 1814	14 March 1815	Guillaume Antoine Benoît Capelle
14 March 1815	22 March 1815	Pierre Joseph Marie Baude
22 March 1815	6 April 1815	André Pierre Étienne Abrial
6 April 1815	14 July 1815	Pierre Joseph Marie Baude
Kingdom of France
14 July 1815	19 July 1820	Emmanuel Jean François Camus du Martroy
19 July 1820	12 August 1830	Jean-Baptiste de Rogniat
Kingdom of the French
12 August 1830	12 March 1831	Paul François Tondu
12 March 1831	8 June 1832	Christophe Alexis Adrien de Jussieu
8 June 1832	14 July 1833	Guillaume Bellon
14 July 1833	25 May 1834	Charles Marchand-Dubreuil
25 May 1834	23 July 1837	Hippolyte Paul Jayr
23 July 1837	10 August 1839	Louis Pierre Adrien Bonnet
10 August 1839	18 March 1841	Christophe Alexis Adrien de Jussieu
18 March 1841	9 July 1843	Guillaume Philippe Rébut de la Rhoëllerie
9 July 1843	15 December 1846	Jean Pierre Marquier
15 December 1846	29 February 1848	Jean Olympie Bouquet
French Second Republic
29 February 1848	28 March 1848	Jean Chrysogone Guigue de Champvans
28 March 1848	20 May 1848	Albert Hugon and Anthelme Roselli Mollet
20 May 1848	6 June 1848	André Édouard Carteron
6 June 1848	20 November 1849	Henri Dézé
20 November 1849	12 March 1851	Léonard Léonce Rochon de La Peyrouse
12 March 1851	6 December 1851	François Victor Adolphe de Chanal
6 December 1851	4 March 1853	Abel Jean-Baptiste Désiré Rogniat
French Second Empire
4 March 1853	8 April 1953	Jean-Baptiste Charles Aladenize
8 April 1953	26 November 1856	Louis Charles Emmanuel de Coëtlogon
26 November 1856	27 July 1859	Jean Paul Gustave Ségaud
27 July 1859	5 October 1861	Charles Jean Louis Le Masson
5 October 1861	5 October 1867	Jean Marie François Léon Chamboduc de Saint-Pulgent
5 October 1867	3 March 1869	Marie Léopold Alexandre Lepeintre
3 March 1869	26 November 1869	Henri Fernand Bourgeois de Jessaint
26 November 1869	6 September 1870	Marie Louis Alfred du Bois de Jancigny
French Third Republic
6 September 1870	27 April 1871	Édouard Clément Julien Puthod
27 April 1871	1 July 1873	Alfred François Hippolyte Nicolas Rousseau
1 July 1873	28 August 1874	Jean Pierre Augustin Raffier-Dufour
28 August 1874	13 April 1876	Marie Paul Esterhazy
13 April 1876	19 May 1877	Guisbert Jean Adrien Jules de Huart
19 May 1877	18 December 1877	Bernard Marie Jean Charles de Raymond-Cahuzac
18 December 1877	15 March 1879	Alfred François Hippolyte Nicolas Rousseau
15 March 1879	12 January 1880	Louis Charles Henri Fresne
12 January 1880	17 November 1880	Eugène Félicien Jules Gellion Danglar
17 November 1880	5 October 1882	Antoine Léon Stéhelin
5 October 1882	12 February 1886	Charles Hippolyte Massat
12 February 1886	22 September 1890	Jean Auguste Gaston Joliet
22 September 1890	18 March 1895	Gervais Achille François Debax
18 March 1895	13 October 1896	Jean François Abel Combarieu
13 October 1896	16 July 1898	Charles Evariste Bonnerot
16 July 1898	20 February 1900	Auguste Alexandre Guillaume Autrand
20 February 1900	5 September 1904	Bernard Joseph Eugène Dardenne
5 September 1904	30 October 1909	Claude Benoît Just
30 October 1909	31 December 1913	Gabriel Marc Charles Olivier Brin
31 December 1913	4 July 1914	Paul Marie Fortuné Peytral
4 July 1914	15 October 1918	Hilaire Toussaint Octave Delfini
15 October 1918	6 November 1918	Paul Léonard Constant Mathivet
6 November 1918	22 January 1919	Joseph Amédée Louis Benoist
22 January 1919	22 January 1919	Prosper Victor Henri Dutreuil
22 January 1919	24 August 1921	Joseph Amédée Louis Benoist
24 August 1921	24 August 1921	Charles Marie Xavier Droz
24 August 1921	30 January 1925	Alfred Jules Alexandre Gondoin
30 January 1925	30 January 1925	Henri Léopold Pierre Chaumet
30 January 1925	2 May 1930	Francisque Annet Varenne
2 May 1930	2 May 1930	Jean Marie Francis Laban
2 May 1930	3 June 1931	Antoine Jean Marcel Lemoine
3 June 1931	8 June 1933	Léopold Georges Mesnard
8 June 1933	2 November 1940	Georges Albert Maurice Bernard
French State
2 November 1940	28 April 1943	Jean-Baptiste François dit Louis Thoumas
28 April 1943	5 August 1943	Paul Louis Emmanuel Balley
5 August 1943	4 February 1944	Alfred Marcel Louis Papinot
4 February 1944	1 July 1944	Joseph Jean Pierre Basile Marcel Delpeyrou
French Fourth Republic
1 July 1944	18 November 1944	Georges Benoît Antoine Dupoizat de Villemont
18 November 1944	24 July 1946	Léon Etienne Blanchard
24 July 1946	18 December 1946	Jean Auguste Emile Rigade
18 December 1946	19 June 1947	Jean Latscha
19 June 1947	7 May 1948	Étienne Édouard Georges Pépin
7 May 1948	17 September 1949	Pierre Lecène
17 September 1949	31 October 1951	Robert Jean Benoît Duperier
31 October 1951	1 July 1955	François Antoine Louis Collaveri
1 July 1955	4 April 1960	Jean Thomassin
French Fifth Republic
4 April 1960	9 December 1961	Célestin Roger Marcel Blanchard
9 December 1961	14 June 1973	Georges Benoît Antoine Dupoizat de Villemont
14 June 1973	21 April 1975	Henri Boucoiran
21 April 1975	13 July 1979	Roger Gaston Albert Ninin
13 July 1979	16 July 1981	Raymond François Le Bris
16 July 1981	3 October 1984	Philippe Jean Marie Loiseau
3 October 1984	9 March 1985	Bernard Gérard
9 March 1985	25 July 1986	Claude Guizard
25 July 1986	24 November 1988	Georges Mazenot
24 November 1988	24 April 1991	Yves Mansillon
24 April 1991	2 November 1992	Michel Festy
2 November 1992	3 August 1995	Jean-Pierre Lacroix
3 August 1995	17 March 1999	Philippe Ritter
17 March 1999	7 October 1999	Jean-Pierre Lacave
7 October 1999	12 July 2002	Pierre-Etienne Bisch
12 July 2002	29 April 2004	Bernard Tomasini
29 April 2004	20 July 2006	Michel Fuzeau
20 July 2006	30 January 2009	Pierre Soubelet
30 January 2009	30 September 2010	Régis Guyot
30 September 2010	20 June 2013	Philippe Galli
20 June 2013	23 August 2016	Laurent Touvet
23 August 2016	Incumbent	Arnaud Cochet

== See also ==
- Prefect
- Prefectures in France
