= Cochet =

Cochet is a French surname. Notable people with the surname include:

- Arnaud Cochet (born 1959), French senior civil servant
- Christophe Cochet (attested after 1606 - death 1634), French sculptor
- Gérard Cochet (1888–1969), French illustrator
- Gustavo Cochet (1894–1979), Argentine painter, engraver and writer
- Henri Cochet (1901–1987), French tennis player
- Jean-Laurent Cochet (1935–2020), French theater director, actor and acting coach
- Jonathan Cochet (born 1977), French racing driver
- Philippe Cochet (born 1961), French politician
- Robert Cochet (1903–1988), French artist medal engraver
- Vladimir Cochet, Swiss musician
- Yves Cochet (born 1946), French politician
