= Papa Amadou Sarr =

Senegalese economist (born 1979)

Chief Executive Officer of PORTEO Group
- In office September 2025 – Present
- Preceded by: Hassan Dakhlallah

Executive Director at French Development Agency
- In office 2022–2025

Minister Delegate for Rapid Entrepreneurship of Women and Youth
- In office 2017–2022

Personal details
- Born: 14 March 1979 (age 47) Senegal
- Education: University of Essex, Sciences Po Paris; EHESS; Sorbonne University
- Occupation: Economist

Papa Amadou Sarr (born 14 March 1979), is a Senegalese economist and businessman executive . He is the CEO of PORTEO Group, a pan-African infrastructure conglomerate headquartered in Abidjan with operations in Côte d'Ivoire, Benin, Togo, Senegal, and Gabon, since October 2025. Prior to his appointment, he was executive director at French Development Agency since 2022. Sarr served in cabinet of Senegal as Minister Delegate for Rapid Entrepreneurship of Women and Youth (DER/FJ) at the Presidency of the Republic of Senegal from 2017 to 2022.

== Biography ==
Sarr was born on 14 March 1979 in Senegal. He attended the Lycée Mame Cheikh Mbaye in Tambacounda, where he was noted as a high-achieving student. He attended the University of Essex in England. He subsequently pursued graduate studies in France, obtaining a Master's in Public Affairs from Sciences Po Paris, a DEA in Comparative Development Studies from the EHESS, and a Master's in Development Studies from the Sorbonne University.

== Career ==
Sarr began his career at the United Nations Development Programme (UNDP) in Dakar. From 2008 to 2013, he worked as Advisor for Regional Cooperation for Africa and the MENA regions and as a Research Associate for Africa at the OECD Development Centre in Paris. He subsequently served as Senior Program Officer for Africa at the Bill and Melinda Gates Foundation in Seattle from April 2013 to July 2015.

Sarr returned to Senegal in 2015 when he joined the cabinet of the Minister of Economy, Finance and Planning as Senior Technical Advisor, before being appointed Director General of the Financial Sector and Competitiveness at the same ministry.

In October 2017, Sarr was appointed Minister Delegate for Rapid Entrepreneurship of Women and Youth at the Presidency of the Republic of Senegal, a body created at the request of President Macky Sall as the first public institution dedicated to fostering entrepreneurship in the country. Sarr oversaw the introduction of Senegal's Startup Act, a legislative framework providing legal and financial support to entrepreneurs.

Following remarks Sarr made on International Women's Day in which he described certain Islamic prohibitions concerning women as contrary to gender equality, he was removed from the office by presidential decree on 9 March 2022, he subsequently issued a public apology.

In September 2022, Sarr joined the French Development Agency (AFD) in Paris as executive director for Mobilization, Partnerships and Communication.

In September 2025, he was appointed the CEO of PORTEO Group, a pan-African conglomerate based in Abidjan, Ivory Coast. The group has operations in Côte d'Ivoire, Benin, Togo, Senegal, and Gabon in strategic infrastructures development.
