= France–Netherlands relations =

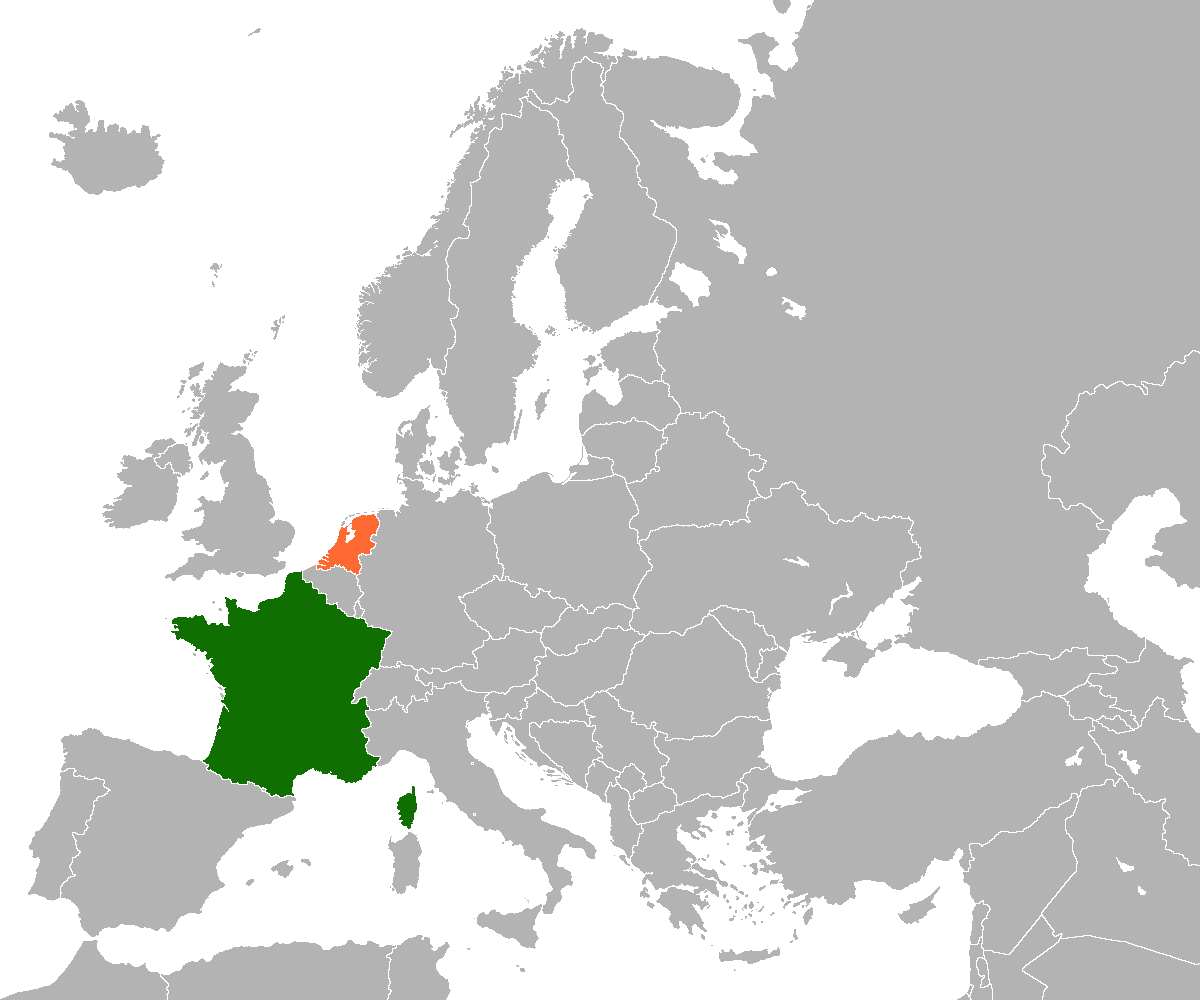
- France: Netherlands

Diplomatic mission
- Embassy of France, The Hague: Embassy of the Netherlands, Paris

Envoy
- Ambassador François Alabrune: Ambassador Jan Versteeg

France and the Netherlands maintain interstate and bilateral relations. The two countries share a border division in the Caribbean island of Saint Martin, to which the northern part of the island is a French overseas collectivity known as the Collectivity of Saint Martin, while the southern part of the island is a Dutch constituent country known as Sint Maarten. Relations between the two countries date back to the 17th and 18th centuries when a conflict led to the transformation of the Dutch Republic to the Batavian Republic and eventually the Kingdom of Holland. Both nations were major European colonial powers in Southeast Asia between the Dutch in Indonesia (East Indies) and the French in Vietnam (Cochinchina, part of Indochina). The two countries currently enjoy close cultural and economic relations. Both nations are members of the OECD and Organization for Security and Co-operation in Europe, as well as founding members of the Council of Europe, the European Union, NATO, and the United Nations.

== History ==
=== Background ===
Close ties between France and the Netherlands already existed in the late Middle Ages. Large parts of what is now the Netherlands belonged to the Burgundian domain at that time, ruled by the House of Valois-Burgundy, a cadet branch of the French royal House of Valois. French was used as the court and cultural language at the court of the Dukes of Burgundy, who ruled both France and the Netherlands in the 15th century.

From the 1560s, France and the Dutch Republic considered themselves to be allies until 1668 when the Dutch Republic formed the Triple Alliance with the Kingdom of England and the Swedish Empire to revolt against Louis XIV of France's expansion in the War of Devolution in support of the Spanish Empire, whom France succeeded as the strongest nation in Europe. Feeling betrayed by the Dutch Republic, Louis realized that the Dutch Republic would hinder France in conquering the Spanish Netherlands.

The Dutch East India Company (VOC) established its presence in the region which expanded to form the Dutch East Indies, a territory largely corresponding to modern-day Indonesia. The capital of the Dutch East Indies was Batavia, which is now Jakarta, as the groundwork for Dutch colonization.

In 1672, Louis was able to convince the Kingdom of England and the Swedish Empire to fight against the Dutch Republic, as Louis had agreed to financially support England. England has already fought in two wars against the Dutch Empire (the First and Second Anglo-Dutch Wars in 1652–1654 and 1665–1667, respectively), prior to their agreement in the Triple Alliance.

=== Franco-Dutch War ===
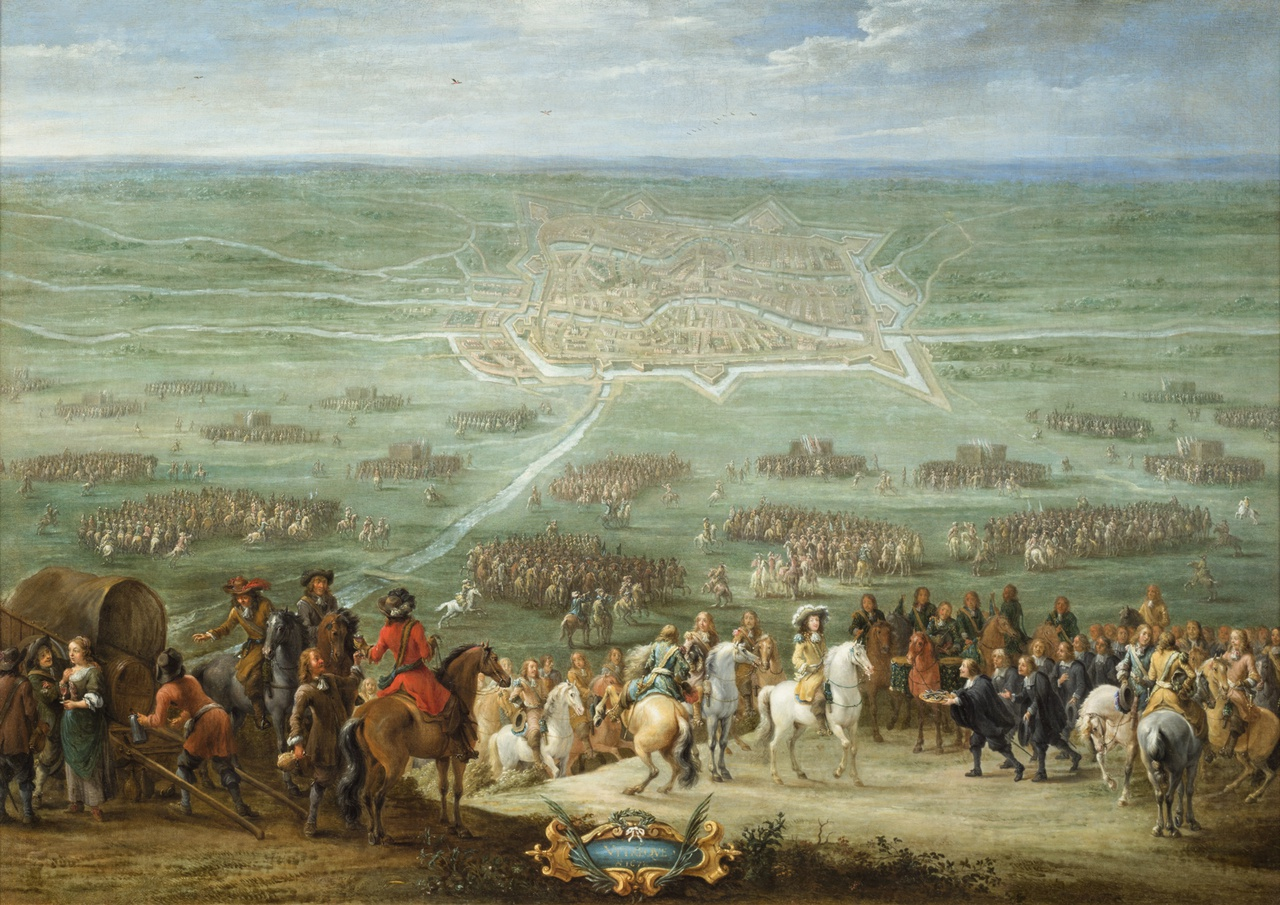
Louis XIV is offered the city keys of Utrecht, as its magistrates formally surrender on 30 June 1672

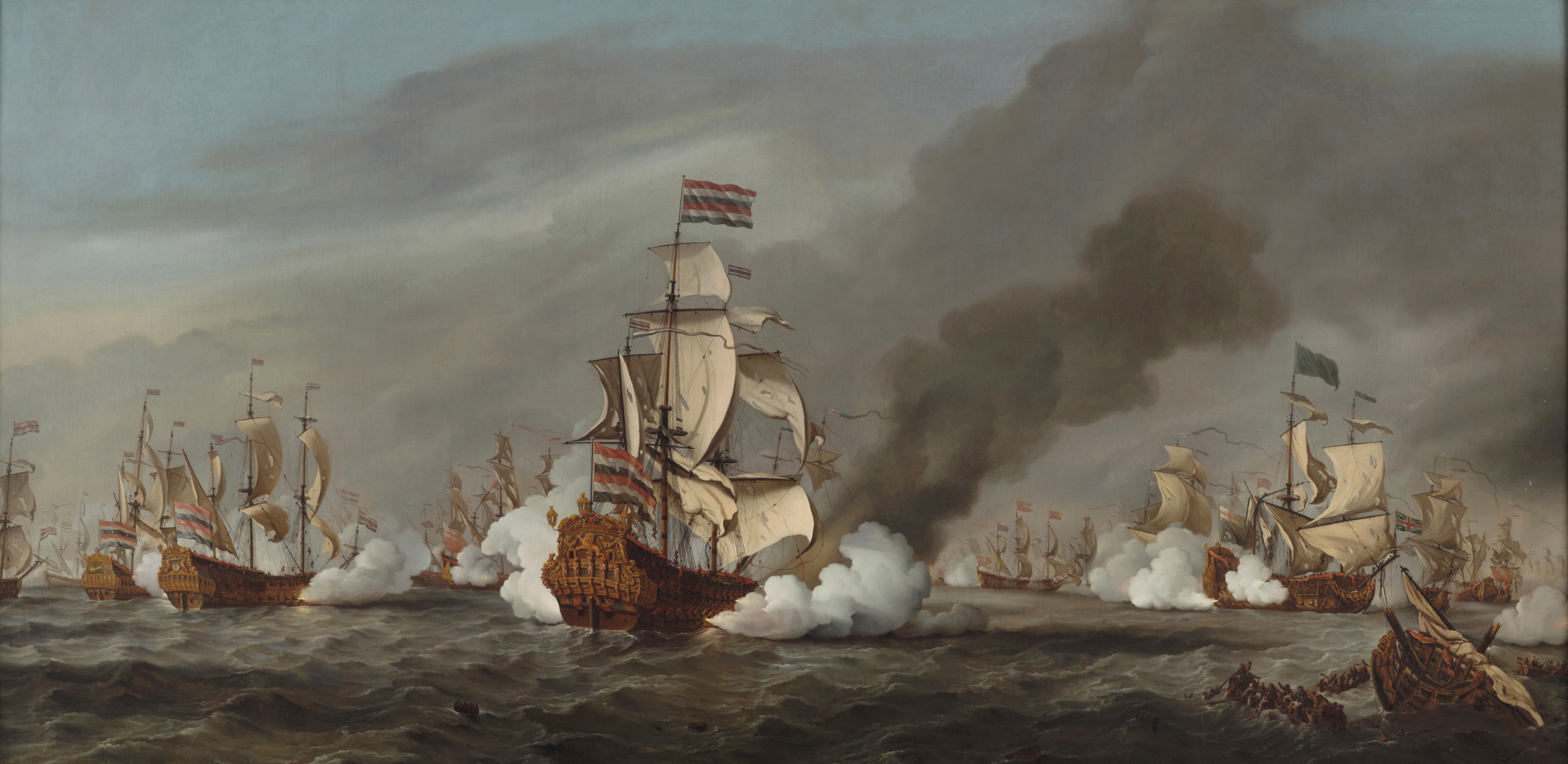
The Dutch victory over an Anglo-French fleet at the Battle of Texel in August 1673 ensured their survival.

The Franco-Dutch War occurred in 1672–1678, shortly after France convinced England and Sweden to switch sides, disbanding the Triple Alliance. 1672 is considered by the Dutch as the "Disaster Year" (Rampjaar).

Supporting Spain, the Dutch Republic was joined by the Margraviate of Brandenburg and the Holy Roman Empire, while the French army expanded through its alliance with the prince-bishops of Münster and Cologne. Prior to the French army's arrival into the Rhine, England had declared war on the Dutch Republic, but their efforts to coordinate with the French navy for attacks on the Dutch fleet ended in failure. By June 1672, France had established fortifications within the Rhine, including Rheinberg, Wesel, and Utrecht, and Münsterans began attacking the north, particularly Groningen. The following month, William of Nassau (the later William III) was acclaimed stadtholder. Upon arrival at the Lower Rhine region, the French army began retreating after witnessing the Imperial and Brandenburgian armies. By December, the Dutch were able to liberate a number of occupied territories in the north after the French had retreated while crossing the Dutch Water Line. However, in late 1673, the French army succeeded in capturing Bonn. In February 1674, England and the Dutch Republic, along with the prince-bishops of Münster and Cologne, signed the Treaty of Westminster, ending the Third Anglo-Dutch War. In August 1674, the Dutch-German-Spanish army entered the territory of northern France, under the command of William III of Orange, where they were met by the French army commanded by Louis II de Condé. In Seneffe, Condé blocked the Dutch-German-Spanish army by detaching about 500 horsemen to keep the Dutch vanguard busy, surrounding the Dutch-German-Spanish army and resulting to a tactical French victory. This became known as the Battle of Seneffe. In 1675, the Swedish army invaded Brandenburg. In March 1678, the French army had entered the Spanish Netherlands and besieged Ghent.

Later that year until 1679, the Treaties of Nijmegen were signed between France, the Dutch Republic, the Holy Roman Empire, Spain, Münster and Sweden, ending the Franco-Dutch War with the Franche-Comté and the Spanish Netherlands belonging to France, making them Europe's strongest power. The war sparked the rivalry between William III, who later became King of England as a result of the Glorious Revolution, and Louis XIV, which intensified in the subsequent Nine Years' War (1688–97) and the War of the Spanish Succession (1701–14), both of which the Dutch Republic supported the coalition against the Kingdom of France. Unfortunately for the Dutch Republic, the war also resulted in the decline of the republic's dominance in overseas trade.

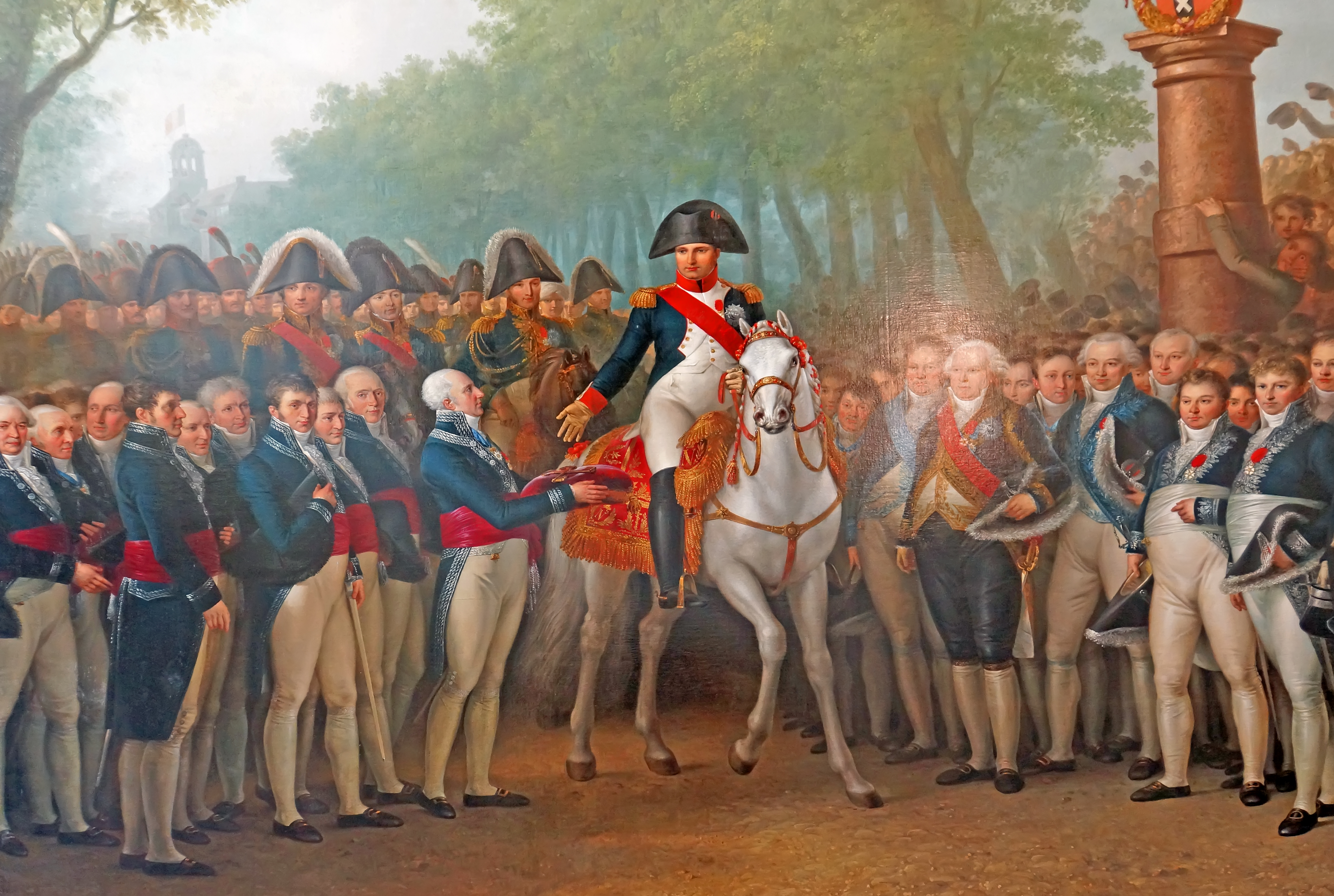
Napoleon's arrival in Amsterdam, 9 October 1811

=== French rule and United Kingdom of the Netherlands ===
In 1795, French revolutionary troops marched into the Netherlands and ended the old republic. With French help, the Batavian Republic (1795–1806) was established as a satellite state of France. Russo-British attempted military campaign during the War of the Second Coalition, aiming to overthrow the French-backed Batavian Republic and restore the House of Orange, but ultimately ended in a strategic retreat and evacuation.

In 1806, Napoleon Bonaparte appointed his brother Louis as King of Holland; in 1810, the northern Netherlands were finally incorporated directly into the French Empire. After Napoleon's fall, the country regained its independence in 1815 at the Congress of Vienna. The union of the northern and southern Netherlands (today's Belgium) to form the United Kingdom of the Netherlands was intended to serve as a buffer state to prevent further French expansion to the north. However, this arrangement proved short-lived: in 1830, Belgium split from the Netherlands in a revolution supported by France, which came to the aid of the Belgian revolutionaries against Dutch attempts to regain control.

=== The 19th century and world wars ===
After Belgium's secession, relations between France and the reduced Netherlands were largely free of tension, although France was not the focus of Dutch foreign policy in the 19th century. France began its colonization of Vietnam in the mid-19th century, initially establishing a colony called French Cochinchina, which will later form itself as French Indochina. Saigon became the capital of Cochinchina. The Netherlands concentrated its diplomatic efforts more on the German Empire (which was formed in 1871) and Great Britain, while there were relatively few direct contacts with France. In the First World War (1914–1918), the Netherlands remained neutral and kept its distance from France and the Entente. In the interwar period, the Dutch continued to pursue a policy of neutrality. Despite Dutch neutrality, both countries were occupied by the Wehrmacht in 1940. During the Second World War, there were no official diplomatic contacts—the Netherlands was occupied by Germany as the Reichskommissariat Niederlande, and the French government was replaced by the collaborating Vichy regime in the south and direct German occupation in the north, so that direct relations were not resumed until after liberation in 1944/45.

=== After 1945 ===
From 1945 onwards, after World War II, both colonies were decolonized, with the Dutch East Indies gaining independence as Indonesia in 1949, and French Indochina being dissolved in 1954 as Vietnam after the First Indochina War. The framework of Franco-Dutch relations changed fundamentally: the Netherlands abandoned its isolationist policy of neutrality and became actively involved in the new Western alliances, NATO (founded in 1949) and the European Communities (from 1957). France and the Netherlands were among the six founding members of the European Coal and Steel Community (ECSC) and later the European Economic Community (EEC). They remained close partners in the first post-war decades, but differences of opinion also emerged. Under Charles De Gaulle, France repeatedly blocked the Netherlands' efforts to bring the United Kingdom into the EEC in the 1960s and rejected further supranational integration of the Community, leading to conflicts with The Hague.

In the decades that followed, relations returned to normal. From the 1970s onwards, France gradually returned to NATO's integrated command structures (full reentry took place in 2009) and, from 1973, also accepted British membership of the EEC, while the Netherlands now gave greater support to European integration. However, in 2005, referendums in both countries rejected the planned EU Constitutional Treaty. In April 2023, the governments of France and the Netherlands issued a joint statement emphasizing their historic friendship and announcing plans to further deepen bilateral relations and cooperation in Europe. In 2023, both sides also resolved a centuries-old dispute over the sale of their mutual border on the Caribbean island of Saint-Martin.

== Collectivity of Saint Martin–Sint Maarten border ==
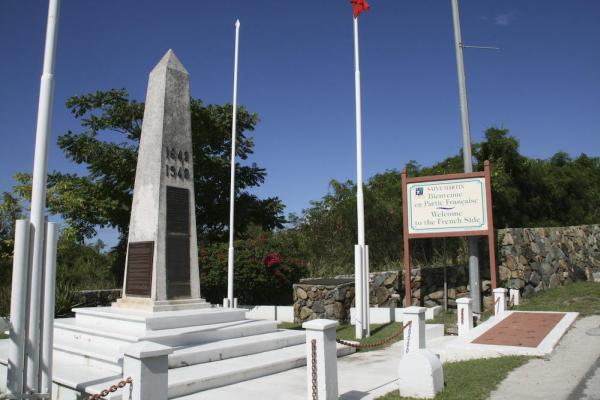
The border crossing between the French Collectivity of Saint Martin and the Dutch Sint Maarten in the island of Saint Martin.

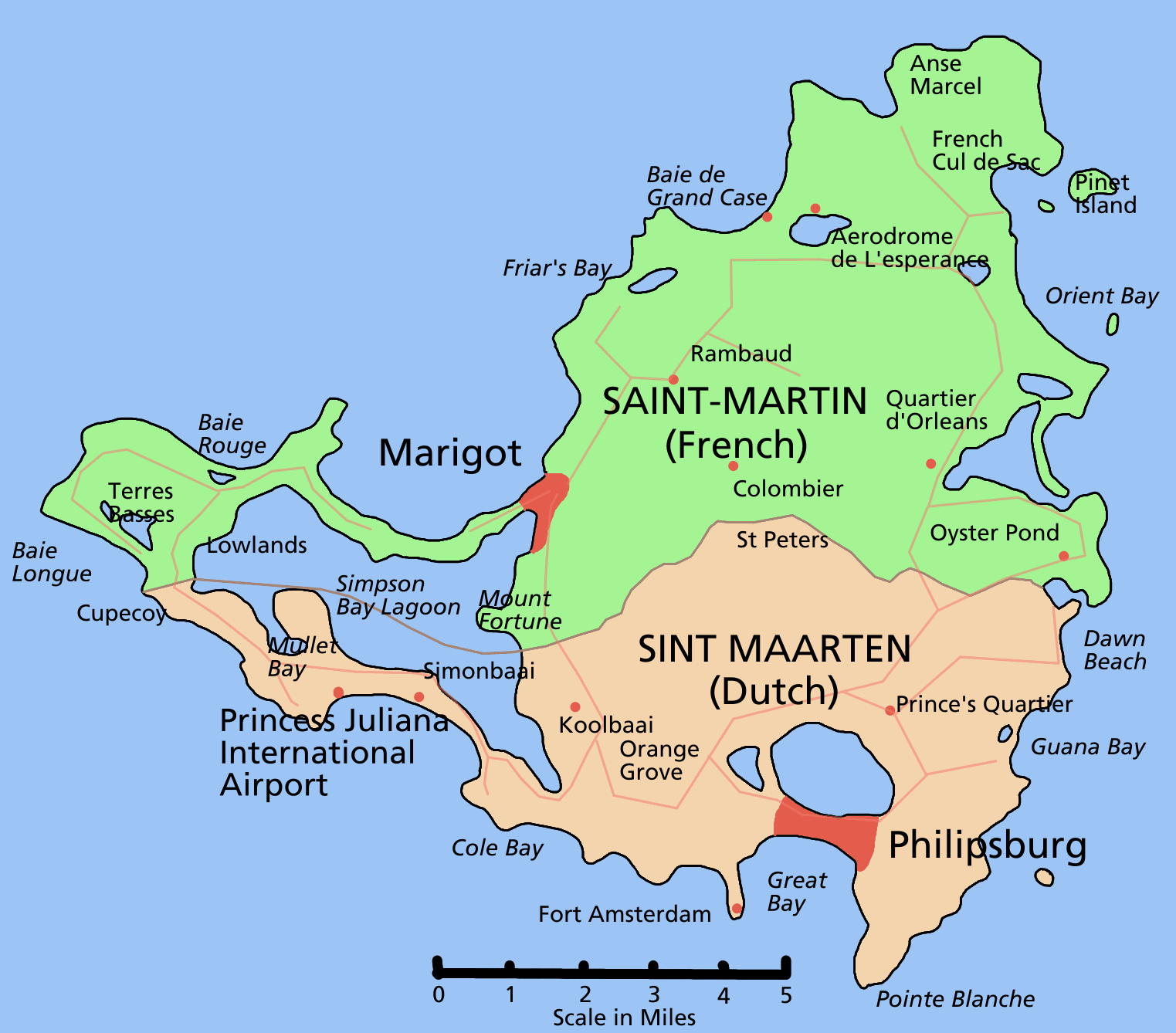
Map of Saint Martin showing the Dutch and French parts.

On 23 March 1648, the French Kingdom and the Dutch Republic signed the Treaty of Concordia atop Mount Concordia, in which both agreed to divide the island of Saint Martin into their own territories – the French Kingdom owning the northern part of the island and the Dutch Republic owning the southern part of island.

On 17 May 1994, the French Republic and the Kingdom of the Netherlands signed the Franco-Dutch treaty on Saint Martin border controls in Paris, aimed at improving border control at the two airports on Saint Martin, namely the Princess Juliana International Airport at the Dutch Sint Maarten and the L'Espérance Airport at the French Collectivity of Saint Martin. The treaty was ratified on 1 August 2007. Among the provisions of the treaty is a requirement for a visa or a landing permit for both the Dutch and French sides if a foreigner is to visit the island of Saint Martin. However, the provisions have not been implemented.

On 1 January 2009, the population of Saint Martin was 77,741 inhabitants – 40,917 living on the Dutch Sint Maarten and 36,824 living on the French Collectivity of Saint Martin.

== Economic relations ==
France is the Netherlands' fourth-largest investor, third-largest exporter, and sixth-largest supplier, to which the Netherlands is also France's seventh-largest exporter and fourth-largest importer. According to the French Ministry of Foreign Affairs and International Development, about 400 French companies in the industries of service, metallurgy, and agriculture maintain operations in the Netherlands, including AccorHotels, Air France–KLM, Atos, Capgemini, Engie, Saint-Gobain, Sodexo, Thales Group, and Total S.A. France and the Netherlands have agreed to establish synergies to further enhance bilateral cooperation between the countries' economies, notably the Air France–KLM merger between their flag carriers (Air France and KLM) in 2004 and the Danone takeover of Numico in 2007. The ministry also stated that between 1993 and 2008, Dutch companies maintaining operations in France, including AkzoNobel, DSM, DSV, Heineken International, Royal Dutch Shell, Philips, SHV Holdings, TNT Express, and Vopak, contributed to the creation of 15,000 jobs in the country.

The last few years there has been an increasing exchange in the field of mobility between France and the Netherlands. Two venues that are particularly popular are Autonomy(Paris) & Intertraffic(Amsterdam).

These exchanges have been facilitated by the embassies, Business France, Choose Paris Region, Amsterdam Trade & Invest and the Dutch Trade Agency(RVO).

== Cultural and scientific cooperation ==
France and the Netherlands have many cultural ties. Over the centuries, there have been mutual influences and waves of migration: in the 17th century, between 50,000 and 75,000 French Huguenots fled to the Calvinist Netherlands, enriching the economy, crafts, and culture there. At the same time, Dutch scholars and artists were active in France—for example, the philosopher René Descartes spent two decades in the Netherlands, where he wrote most of his works. The French language played a prominent role in the Netherlands until well into the 19th century: French was long the preferred language of education and the upper classes, and from 1863 it was even a compulsory subject in Dutch schools.

From 1957 until its closure in 2013, the Institut Néerlandais in Paris promoted Dutch art and culture and was one of the oldest cultural centers in the city. Its counterpart, the Institut Français, has branches in Amsterdam and Groningen that promote French art and culture. A number of French research institutes, including the Centre national de la recherche scientifique, the Institut national de la recherche agronomique, IFREMER, and the French Institute of Health and Medical Research, have signed agreements with Dutch research institutes to enhance collaborative capabilities. The French Ministry of Foreign Affairs and International Development has also stated that French legal culture is being promoted at the International Court of Justice in The Hague.

== Military relations ==
Both countries are among the twelve founding members of NATO (1949) and already worked closely together in the Western defense alliance during the Cold War. After the end of the East-West conflict in 1990, French and Dutch armed forces participated side by side in many international missions, such as UN and NATO operations in the Balkans and Afghanistan. To this day, the Netherlands considers the US and the Atlantic Alliance to be the cornerstones of its security policy, while France has traditionally placed greater emphasis on independent European defense. However, both countries now support joint EU initiatives such as the Permanent Structured Cooperation (PESCO) to strengthen European security. In 2019, France and the Netherlands renewed a bilateral declaration of intent to deepen defense cooperation; in 2023, both governments announced that they would conclude a formal framework agreement for more intensive cooperation in the field of defense and security.

== Drug combat ==
According to the French Ministry of Foreign Affairs and International Development, France and the Netherlands have cooperated with each other in the prohibition of drugs since 1995 through the leadership of a high-level bilateral group. The two countries hold annual meetings in The Hague and Paris.

== State visits ==
In the year 2000, French President Jacques Chirac and his wife Bernadette brought a state visit to the Netherlands. They were received by Queen Beatrix and Prime Minister Wim Kok in Amsterdam. Afterwards, Chirac and Kok went to The Hague for a visit to the Mauritshuis.

French President François Hollande visited the Netherlands on 20 January 2014, where he met with King Willem-Alexander, Queen Máxima, and Prime Minister Mark Rutte. He also met with the House of Representatives and the Senate, where he addressed the diplomatic and political ties between the two countries.

In 2016, King Willem-Alexander together with Queen Maxima brought a state visit to France, where they were received by President Hollande in the Élysée Palace.

On 11 April 2023, French President Emmanuel Macron and his wife Brigitte paid a 2-day state visit to the Netherlands. They were received by King Willem-Alexander and Queen Maxima at the Royal Palace of Amsterdam. Afterwards, Macron went to The Hague, where he gave a speech about his vision on the future of Europe. The next day, Macron and Prime Minister Mark Rutte went to the Rijksmuseum to see an exhibition about Dutch painter Johannes Vermeer.

== International organizations ==
Both countries are founding members of the European Union, NATO, the Council of Europe and the United Nations.

== Resident diplomatic missions ==
- France has an embassy in The Hague and a consulate in Amsterdam.
- Netherlands has an embassy in Paris.
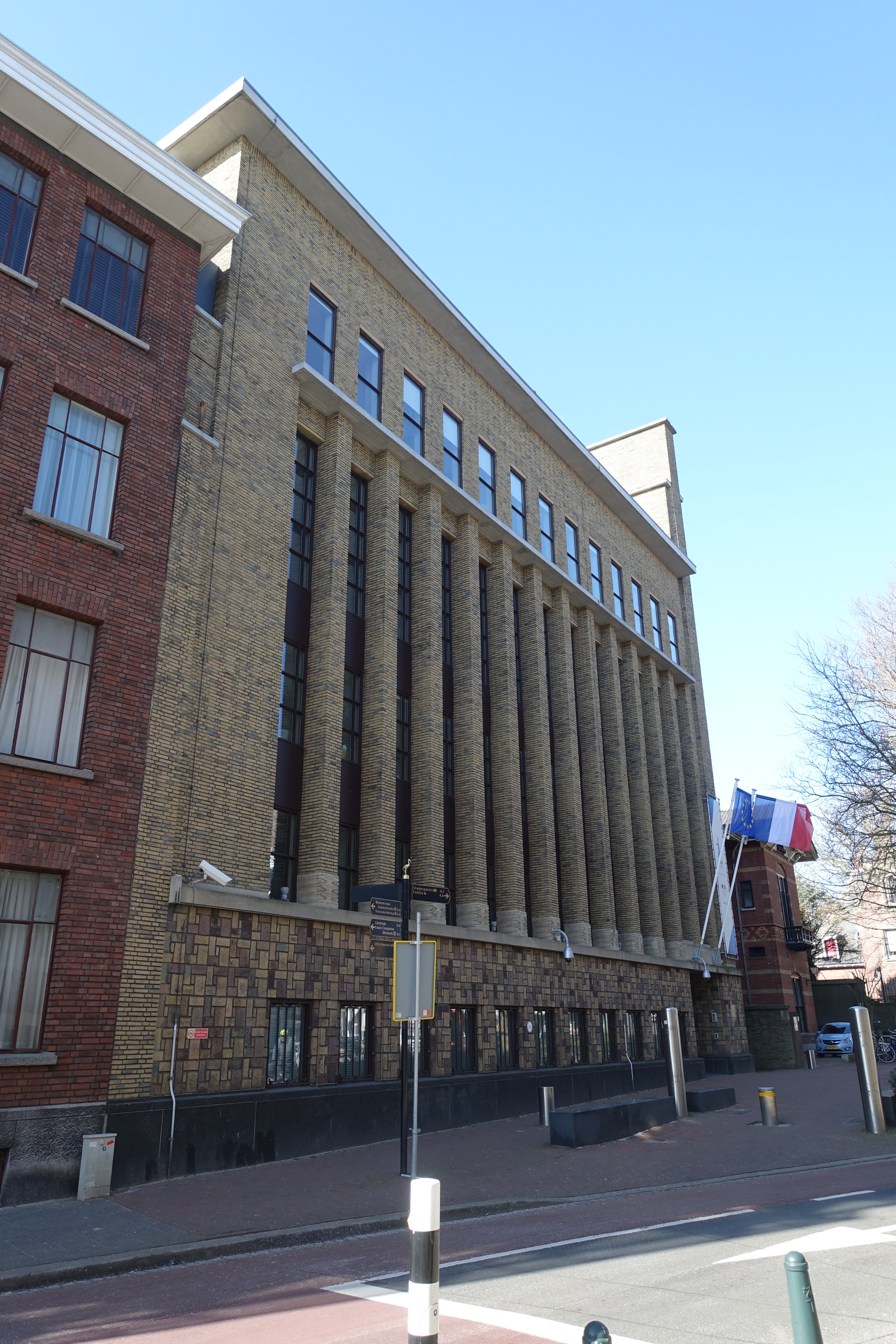
Embassy of France in The Hague

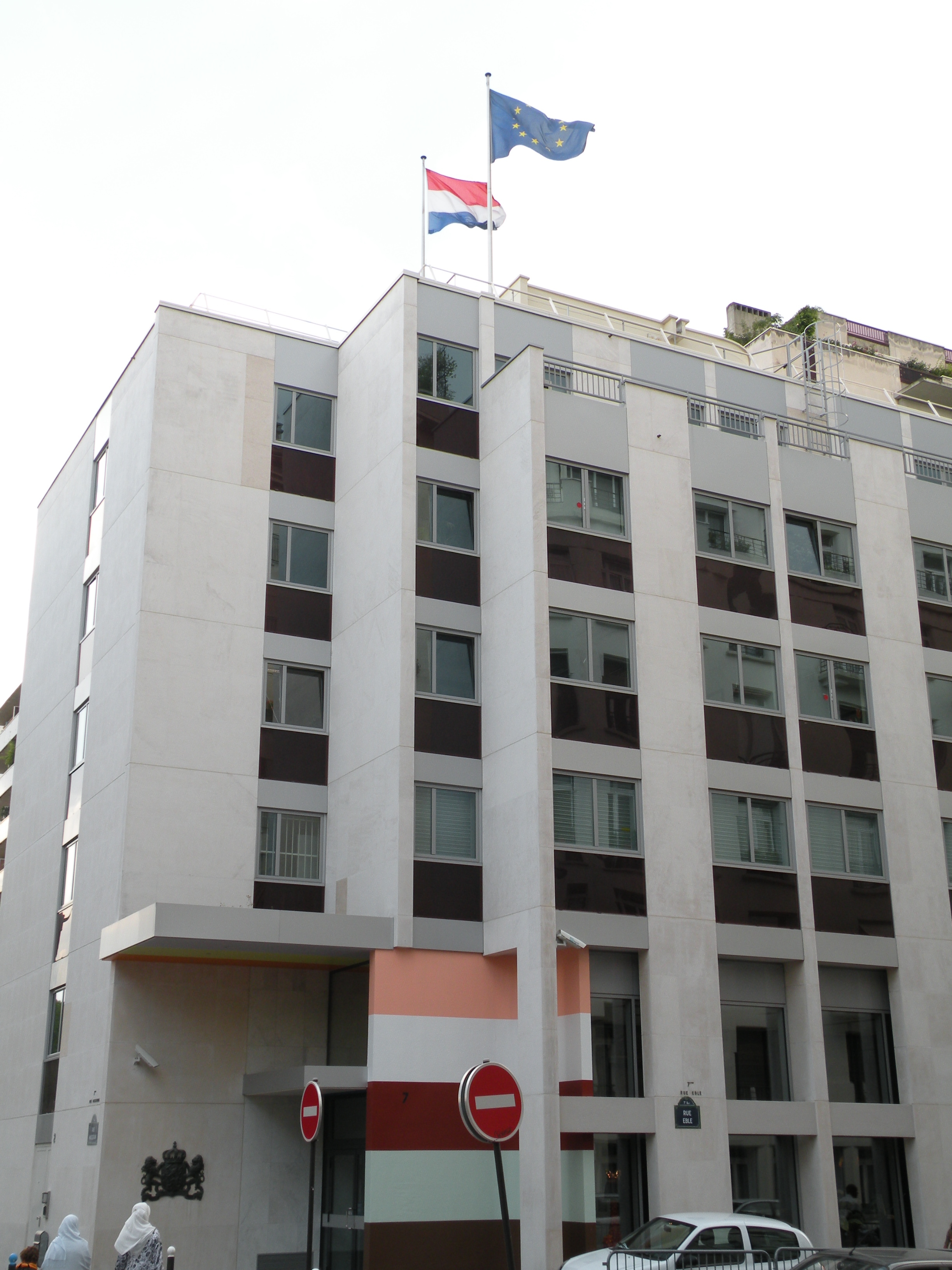
Embassy of the Netherlands in Paris

== See also ==
- Foreign relations of France
- Foreign relations of the Netherlands

== Bibliography ==
- Lynn, John A. The Wars of Louis XIV, 1667–1714. Longman, (1999). ISBN 0-582-05629-2
- Sommerville, J. P. (16 January 2008), The wars of Louis XIV, archived from the original on 3 June 2012
