= Marketplace on Innovative Financial Solutions for Development =

The Marketplace on Innovative Financial Solutions for Development (MIF) is hosted in Paris, France, by the French Development Agency (AFD), the Bill & Melinda Gates Foundation and the World Bank Group.

This initiative is dedicated to innovative financial mechanisms allowing to better mobilize funds for development programs. The MIF garners best practices by presenting new projects and encouraging conversations between specialists from different fields. The event focuses on meetings and case studies, combining theoretical and practical points of views.

The MIF has three main objectives:

- move forward the agenda on innovative financial solutions for development;
- encourage knowledge-sharing and learning (including between developing areas) through best practices and case studies in order to identify how to design solutions to maximize impact and cost-effectiveness;
- leverage projects using innovative financial mechanisms to deal with development issues.

The MIF audience consists of professionals from different areas:

- development practitioners
- donors
- philanthropists
- social entrepreneurs
- academics
- policy makers

Speakers and participants come from financial institutions and the civil society.

== MIF 2010 ==
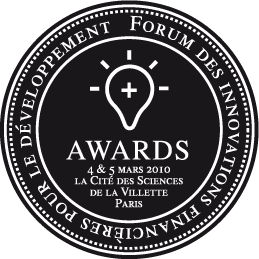
MIF 2010 logo

The 2010 event takes place on March 4–5, in Cité des Sciences et de l'Industrie, Paris. The MIF 2010 program consists of two main sessions, 13 workshops and a competition between innovative projects for financing development.

A feature of the MIF 2010 event is a project competition aimed at new ideas on how innovative financing mechanisms can be used to better solve development challenges. These projects should provide solutions that can be successfully scaled up and replicated across a broad variety of situations.

Twenty finalists have been chosen from a pool of some 800 applicants that responded to the open call for proposals during the autumn of 2009. 110 specialists in innovative finance together with development experts from inside and outside of the organising institutions selected the most promising as finalists.

The proposed projects cover more than 15 developing countries across five continents and were submitted by a variety of organisations ranging from small local NGOs to large multinational corporations to international development organizations.
