= Richard Samuel (prefect) =

French civil servant (born 1952)

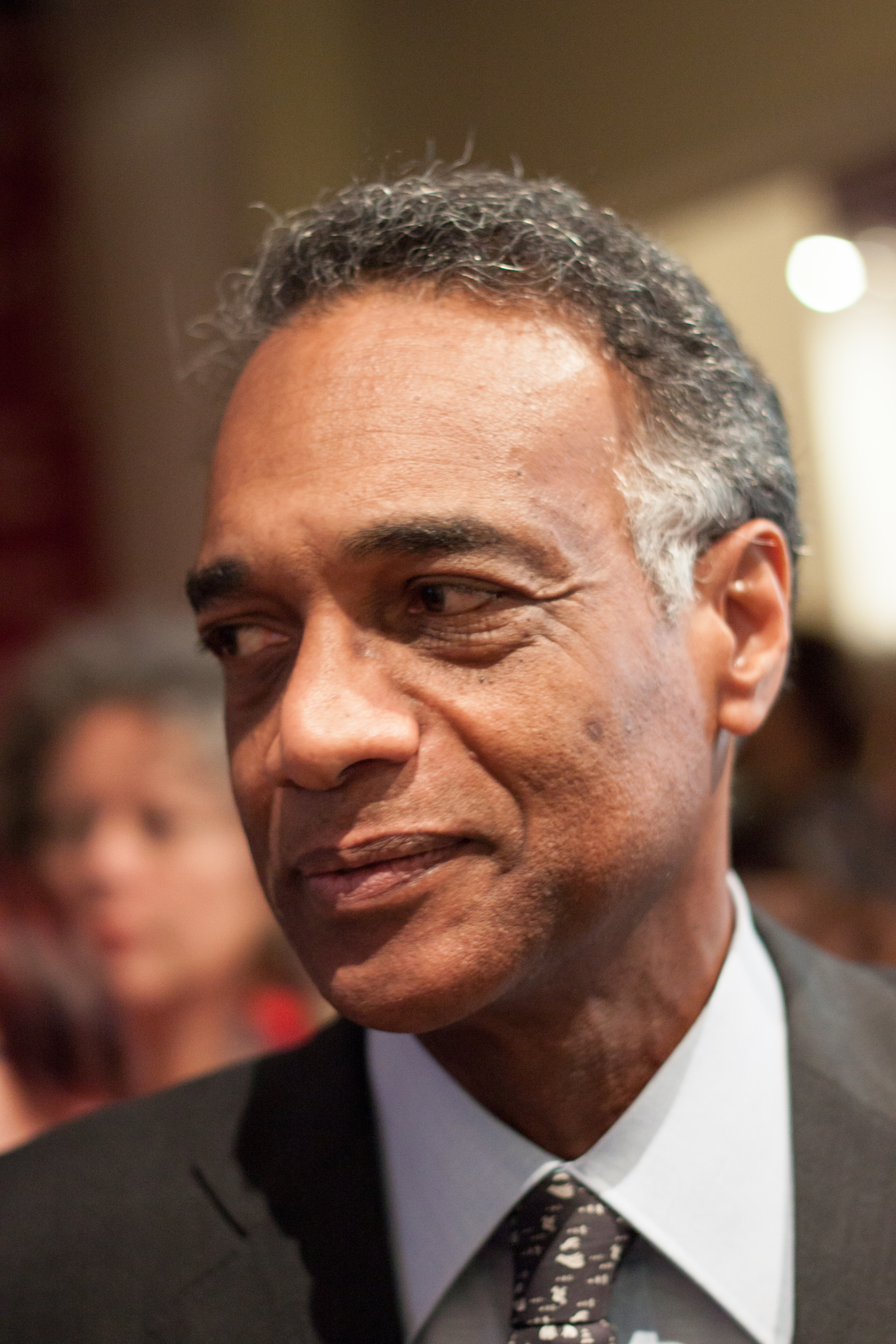
- Richard Samuel in September 2012
- Born: 20 January 1952 (age 74); Pointe-à-Pitre, Guadeloupe
- Education: Sciences Po, ÉNA
- Occupation: Prefect

Richard Samuel (born 20 January 1952 in Pointe-à-Pitre, Guadeloupe) is a French civil servant.

He is a graduate of Institut d’études politiques de Paris (IEP Paris).

== Career ==
- 1978-1981 (promotion Droits de l’homme) : École nationale d'administration (ÉNA)
- On 2 May 1988: sub-prefect of Clermont, Oise, Picardy
- On 24 March 1993: sub-prefect of Vienne, Isère, Rhône-Alpes
- On 16 December 1999: sub-prefect of Le Havre, Seine-Maritime, Upper Normandy
- On 4 August 2003: prefect of Meuse in Bar-le-Duc
- On 25 August 2005: in charge of victims of West Caribbean Airways Flight 708
- On 9 July 2007: prefect of Eure in Évreux
- On 26 November 2009: prefect of Maine-et-Loire in Angers
- On 1 August 2012: prefect of Isère in Grenoble

== Honours and awards ==
- France: Officer of the Legion of Honour (2014)
- France: Commandeur of the Ordre national du Mérite (2011)
- France: Chevalier (Knight) of the Ordre du Mérite agricole

== See also ==
Political offices
Preceded by Bernard Fitoussi	Prefect of Meuse; 2003–	Succeeded by Michel Lafon
Preceded by Jacques Laisne	Prefect of Eure; 2007–	Succeeded by Fabienne Buccio
Preceded by Marc Cabane	Prefect of Maine-et-Loire; 2009–	Succeeded by François Burdeyron
Preceded by Éric Le Douaron	Prefect of Isère; 2012–	Succeeded by Still holding
