= Anne Paugam =

French civil servant (born 1966)

Anne Paugam (born 1966 in Grenoble) is a French senior civil servant and General Inspector of Finances. She has been Chief Executive Officer of French Development Agency from 2013 until 2016.

== Biography ==
Anne Paugam graduated from the Institut d'études politiques de Paris (IEP – Public Service Department, options in Economics and International Relations, valedictorian) in 1993, is an alumnus of ENA (National School of Administration), Léon Gambetta class (1993), and was appointed Inspector of Finances in 1994.

She joined the World Bank via the Young Professionals’ Program in 1997, where she initially worked at the Vice-Presidency for Southeast Asia, before joining the team of the Infrastructure Sector Unit (Urban Group Europe and Central Asia Region), in Washington, D.C. From 1999 to 2001, she held the position of Senior Public Sector Specialist for the World Bank in Rabat, Morocco. She was responsible for supporting Morocco’s public sector reform projects, which included the initiatives of Moroccan leaders to simplify and deconcentrate the budget management of ministries.

Anne Paugam was subsequently appointed to the Office of Charles Josselin at the Ministry for Cooperation and Francophonie, as a technical advisor, then as Deputy Director, from September 2001 to May 2002. She was responsible for issues related to financing for development (CICID – Interministerial Committee on International Cooperation and Development – of February 2002 on taking further the reform of the cooperation policy and on financing for development; Monterrey International Conference on Financing for Development in March 2002).

She joined the French Development Agency in 2002, which was at the time headed by Jean-Michel Severino. She established the Strategic Planning and Management Department, which she headed until 2004. She subsequently became Director of the Human Development Division (financing projects in the education, vocational training and health sectors) at the Operations Department until 2007. Anne Paugam was Deputy Secretary-General from 2007 to 2008, and went on to become Secretary-General. In this capacity, until 2010 she was a member of the Executive Committee, in charge of the financial institution’s budget, resources, finance, and risks.

From 2010 to 2013, she was referent Inspector General for Development at the Inspectorate-General for Finance, where she conducted a regular dialogue with the administrations in charge of the bilateral and multilateral aid policy on issues concerning Official Development Assistance. She managed missions on international subjects, including on issues concerning aid, and participated in the report requested by Parliament under the chairmanship of the State Councillor, Christine Maugüé, on French operators for public expertise at international level.

In June 2013, she took over from Dov Zerah as Chief Executive Officer of the French Development Agency. She is the first woman to head France’s main operator for Official Development Assistance.

== Other activities ==
In a personal capacity, Anne Paugam has contributed to various reflection processes, including the report on cooperation published by the Terra Nova Foundation in 2011.

== See also ==
=== External links ===
- Article Jeune Afrique : « Anne Paugam remplace Dov Zerah à tête de l’AFD » https://web.archive.org/web/20140714125649/http://www.gouvernement.fr/presse/projet-de-nomination-de-anne-paugam
- Video of parliamentary hearing https://www.assemblee-nationale.tv/media.12.4290.1861665

=== Press articles ===
- Anne Paugam, une professionnelle pour financer l’aide au développement - https://www.la-croix.com/Actualite/Monde/Anne-Paugam-une-professionnelle-pour-financer-l-aide-au-developpement-2013-07-04-982169
- Anne Paugam : « Nous devons renouveler notre approche des pays en crise pour gagner en réactivité » - http://www.lesechos.fr/monde/afrique-moyen-orient/0203356999592-anne-paugam-nous-devons-renouveler-notre-approche-des-pays-en-crise-pour-gagner-en-reactivite-655998.php
- L'AFD an enregistré une hausse de 8% de son activité l'an passé - http://www.lesechos.fr/monde/afrique-moyen-orient/0203523730941-l-afd-a-enregistre-une-hausse-de-8-de-son-activite-l-an-passe-673846.php
- Visit to Kenya by Mrs. Anne Paugam, Chief Executive Officer of Agence Française de Développement (AFD)- https://web.archive.org/web/20140714153110/http://www.ambafrance-ke.org/First-visit-to-Kenya-of-Mrs-Anne
- Les ambitions d'Anne Paugam pour l'Agence française de développement - http://www.euractiv.fr/developpement/les-ambitions-danne-paugam-pour-lagence-francaise-de-developpement-19406.html
- ANNE PAUGAM- https://business-herald.com/personnalites/anne-paugam
- Première visite d'Anne Paugam, DG de l'AFD ce vendredi à Dakar - https://www.pressafrik.com/Premiere-visite-d-Anne-Paugam-DG-de-l-AFD-ce-vendredi-a-Dakar_a120037.html
- Anne Paugam - https://web.archive.org/web/20140714134616/http://wuf7.unhabitat.org/anne-paugam
