= Jean Bassères =

Interim Director of Sciences Po
- In office March 27, 2024 – September 20, 2024
- Preceded by: Mathias Vicherat
- Succeeded by: Luis Vassy

Director General of France Travail
- In office December 15, 2011 – December 15, 2023
- Preceded by: Christian Charpy
- Succeeded by: Thibaut Guilluy

Personal details
- Born: May 22, 1960 (age 65) Perpignan, France
- Education: Sciences Po; École nationale d'administration

Jean Bassères (born May 22, 1960) is a French high ranking civil servant and former interim director of Sciences Po. He previously served as the director general of France Travail from December 15, 2011 until December 15, 2023.

== Biography ==
=== Early life and education ===
A graduate of Sciences Po, Bassères went on to study at the École nationale d'administration from 1984 until 1986.

=== Professional life ===
On March 26, 2024, Bassères was named the interim director of the Institut d'études politiques de Paris (Sciences Po) and the interim administrator of Fondation nationale des sciences politiques (FNSP). He served until the appointment of Luis Vassy on September 20, 2024.
