= Mathias Vicherat =

French civil servant

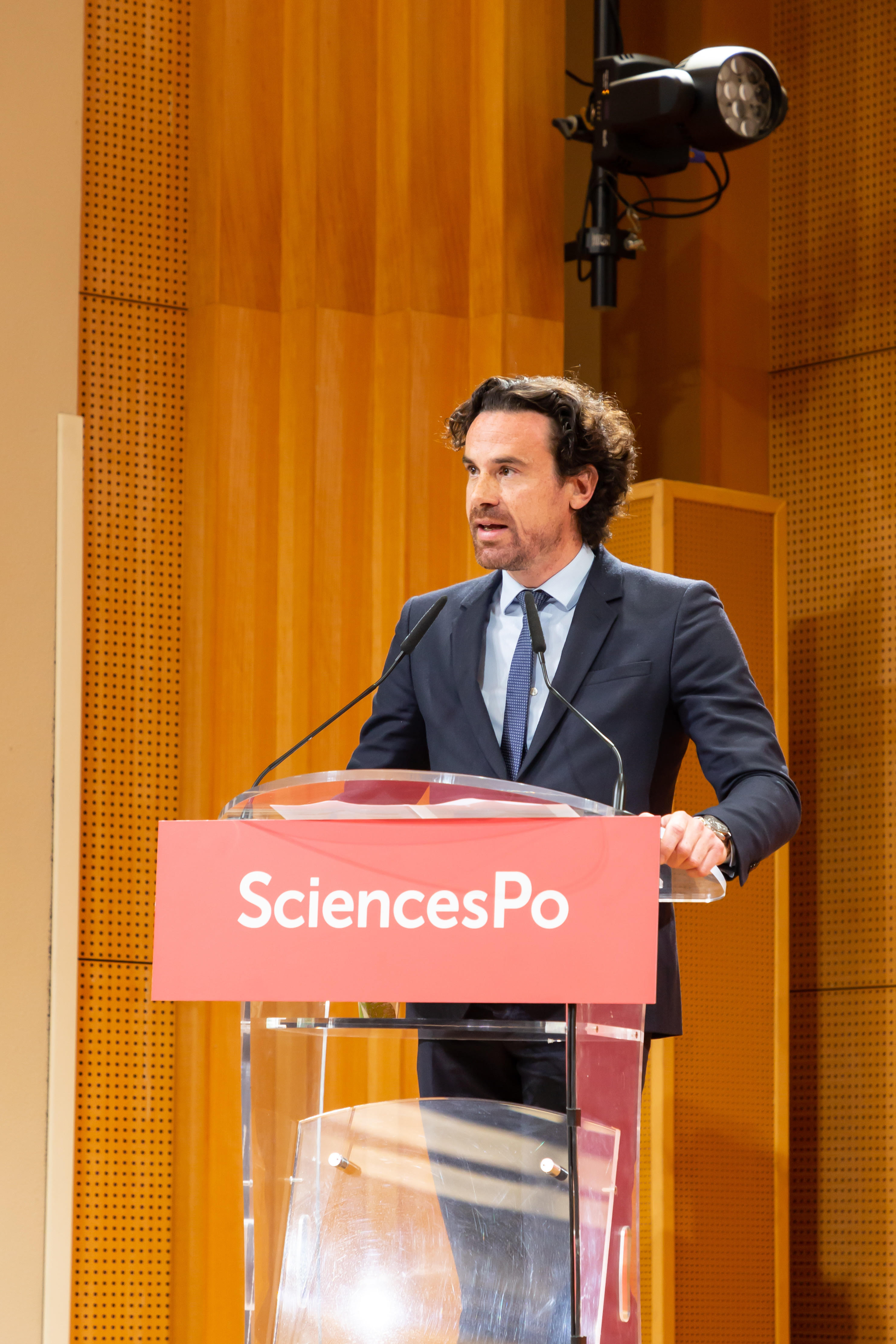
- Vicherat in 2022

Director of Sciences Po
- In office 22 November 2021 – 13 March 2024
- Preceded by: Frédéric Mion
- Succeeded by: Jean Bassères (interim); Luis Vassy

Cabinet Director of the Mayor of Paris
- In office 2012–2017
- Mayor: Bertrand Delanoë; Anne Hidalgo
- Preceded by: Nicolas Revel
- Succeeded by: Raphaël Chambon

Cabinet Director of the Prefect of Somme
- In office 2004–2006

Personal details
- Born: 26 May 1978 (age 48) Les Lilas, France
- Children: 1
- Education: Sciences Po; École nationale d'administration

Mathias Vicherat (born 26 May 1978) is a French civil servant and who had been the director of Sciences Po from November 2021 until his resignation in March 2024.

== Early life ==
He was born in 1978 in Seine-Saint-Denis. His father worked for Fnac.

== Professional career ==
In September 2010, Vicherat became the deputy director of the cabinet for the Mayor of Paris, succeeding François Blouvac. In 2012, he replaced Nicolas Revel as Cabinet Director of Bertrand Delanoë.

Vicherat maintained his post after the election of Anne Hidalgo as Mayor of Paris in 2014.

=== Sciences Po ===
On 10 November 2021, he was elected by the administrative council of the Fondation nationale des sciences politiques. He was named Director of the l'Institut d'études politiques de Paris (Sciences Po) and administrator of Fondation nationale des sciences politiques by a decree from the President of France and an order of the Minister of Higher Education, Research and Innovation.

Vicherat resigned on 13 March 2024, after being ordered to stand trial on charges of domestic violence.

== Personal life ==
From 2013 until 2021, he was in a relationship with journalist Marie Drucker. They have a son.

On 3 December 2023, Vicherat alongside his partner Anissa Bonnefont were both placed under police custody, each accused of intimate partner violence. Both were released the next day. In France, the opening of a judicial investigation is the rule following a filing of criminal complaint (main courante) for domestic violence. As a criminal complaint was filed first by Bonnefont and then by Vicherat, a judicial investigation was opened. He was ordered to stand trial for the incident in March 2024.
