= Abderezak Sebgag =

Algerian politician

Abderrazak Sebgag
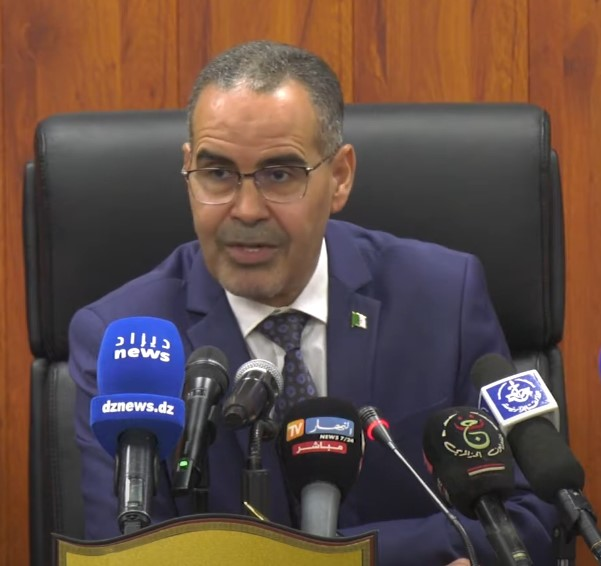

Minister of Youth and Sports
- In office 7 July 2021 – 16 March 2023
- President: Abdelmadjid Tebboune
- Prime Minister: Aymen Benabderrahmane
- Succeeded by: Abderrahmane Hammad

Personal details
- Born: 19 January 1967 (age 59)
- Education: École nationale d'administration (GDip)

Abderrazak Sebgag (born 19 January 1967) is an Algerian politician. Previously he had served as Minister of Youth and Sports from 7 July 2021 until 16 March 2023.

== Education ==
Sebgag holds a diploma from the École nationale d'administration.
