= François Alabrune =

French diplomat and jurist

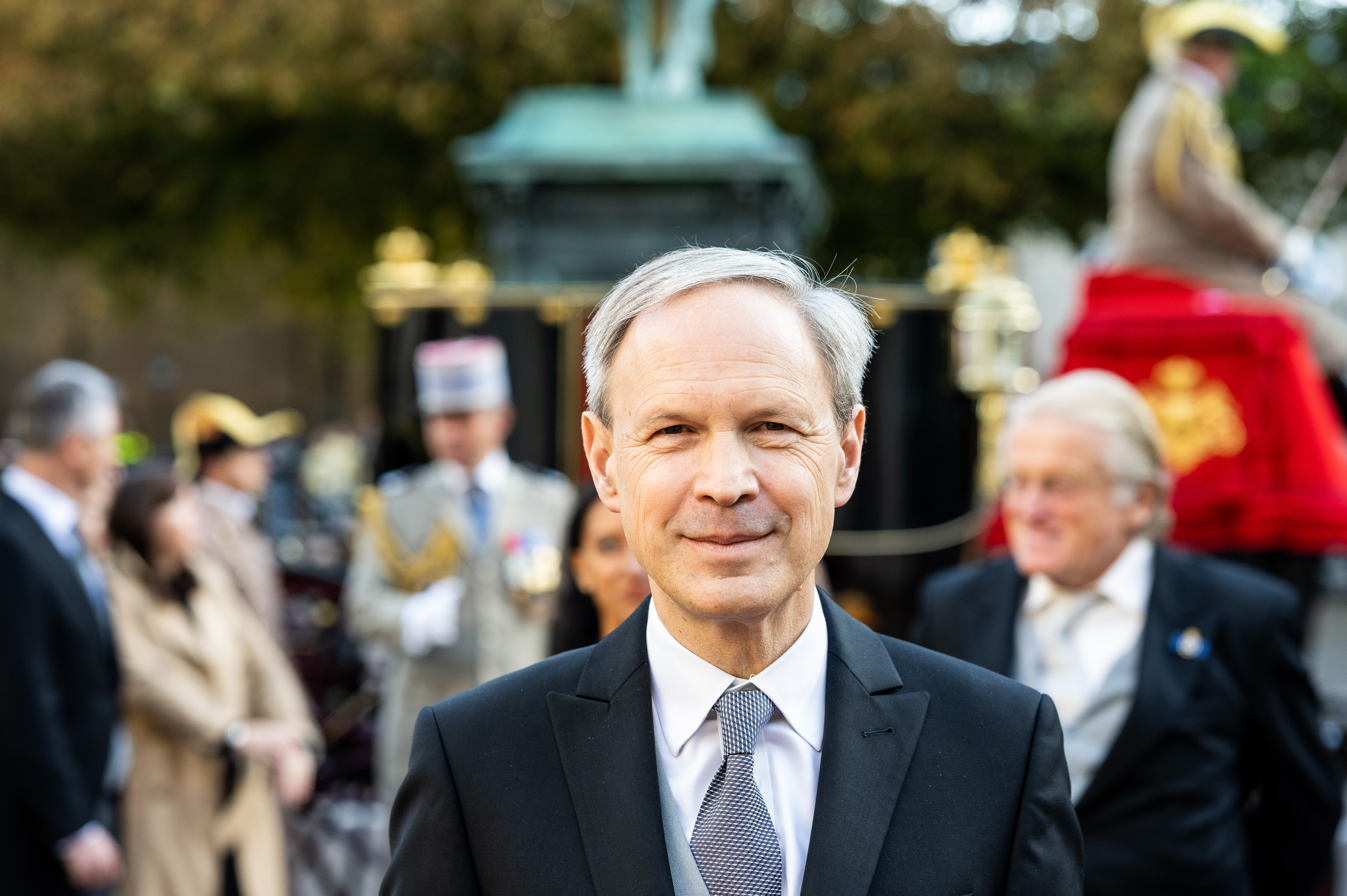
- Alabrune in 2022

Ambassador of France to the Netherlands
- Incumbent
- Assumed office 7 September 2022
- Preceded by: Luis Vassy

Permanent representative of France to the OPCW
- Incumbent
- Assumed office 7 September 2022
- Preceded by: Luis Vassy

Personal details
- Born: 12 January 1962 (age 64) Halifax, Canada
- Education: Université de Limoges; Paris Institute of Political Studies; ENA

François Alabrune (born 12 January 1962) is a French senior civil servant, diplomat, and jurist. He has been the French Ambassador to the Netherlands since 19 October 2022 and serves as the Permanent Representative of France to the Organization for the Prohibition of Chemical Weapons (OPCW) and the International Legal Institutions in The Hague (Netherlands).

== Biography ==
François Alabrune holds a law degree from the University of Limoges (1982) and graduated from the Paris Institute of Political Studies in 1984. He joined the National School of Administration (ENA) as part of the Michel de Montaigne class (1986-1988).

Assigned to the Legal Affairs Directorate of the French Ministry of Foreign Affairs in 1988, François Alabrune joined the Permanent Representation of France to the European Union in Brussels in 1992. From 1996 to 2000, he was posted to the Permanent Mission of France to the United Nations in New York as Legal Adviser. He then returned to the central administration, where he served as Deputy Director of Legal Affairs.

In 2004, François Alabrune was appointed Consul General in Quebec City, a position he held until 2009. He then became Ambassador and Permanent Representative of France to the Organization for Security and Co-operation in Europe (OSCE) in Vienna until 2014.

Appointed Director of Legal Affairs and Legal Adviser to the Ministry of Foreign Affairs in 2014, he represented France in proceedings before the International Court of Justice, the European Court of Human Rights, the Court of Justice of the European Union, the Permanent Court of Arbitration, the International Criminal Court, and the Central Commission for Navigation on the Rhine.

In September 2022, he became the Ambassador of France to the Kingdom of the Netherlands and Permanent Representative to the Organisation for the Prohibition of Chemical Weapons (OPCW).

In November 2026, he was elected to the International Court of Justice (ICJ) by the United Nations General Assembly and Security Council in the first round of voting. His nine-year term will begin on 6 February 2027. Following his election, French Foreign Minister Jean-Noël Barrot hailed it as a “major victory for France” in a post on X.

== Teaching and Publications ==
François Alabrune taught public international law at the Paris Dauphine University (1988-1992) and the Paris Institute of Political Studies (2001-2004). He has published a number of books and articles on international law and diplomacy, particularly on the law of the sea, international humanitarian law, and the International Criminal Court.

== Other Participations ==
François Alabrune has been a member of the French Society of International Law since 2001 and a member of its Board of Directors from 2014 to 2022. He has also been a member of the International Law Association since 2014 and of the Strategic Orientation Committee of the European School of Law in Toulouse since 2019.

Since 2022, François Alabrune has served as an International Gender Champion

== Honors and Decorations ==
- Knight of the Legion of Honor (2008)
- Officer of the National Order of Quebec (2009)
- Officer of the National Order of Merit (2018)
- Grand Cross of the Order of Orange-Nassau (Netherlands) (2023)
