= Luis Vassy =

French diplomat

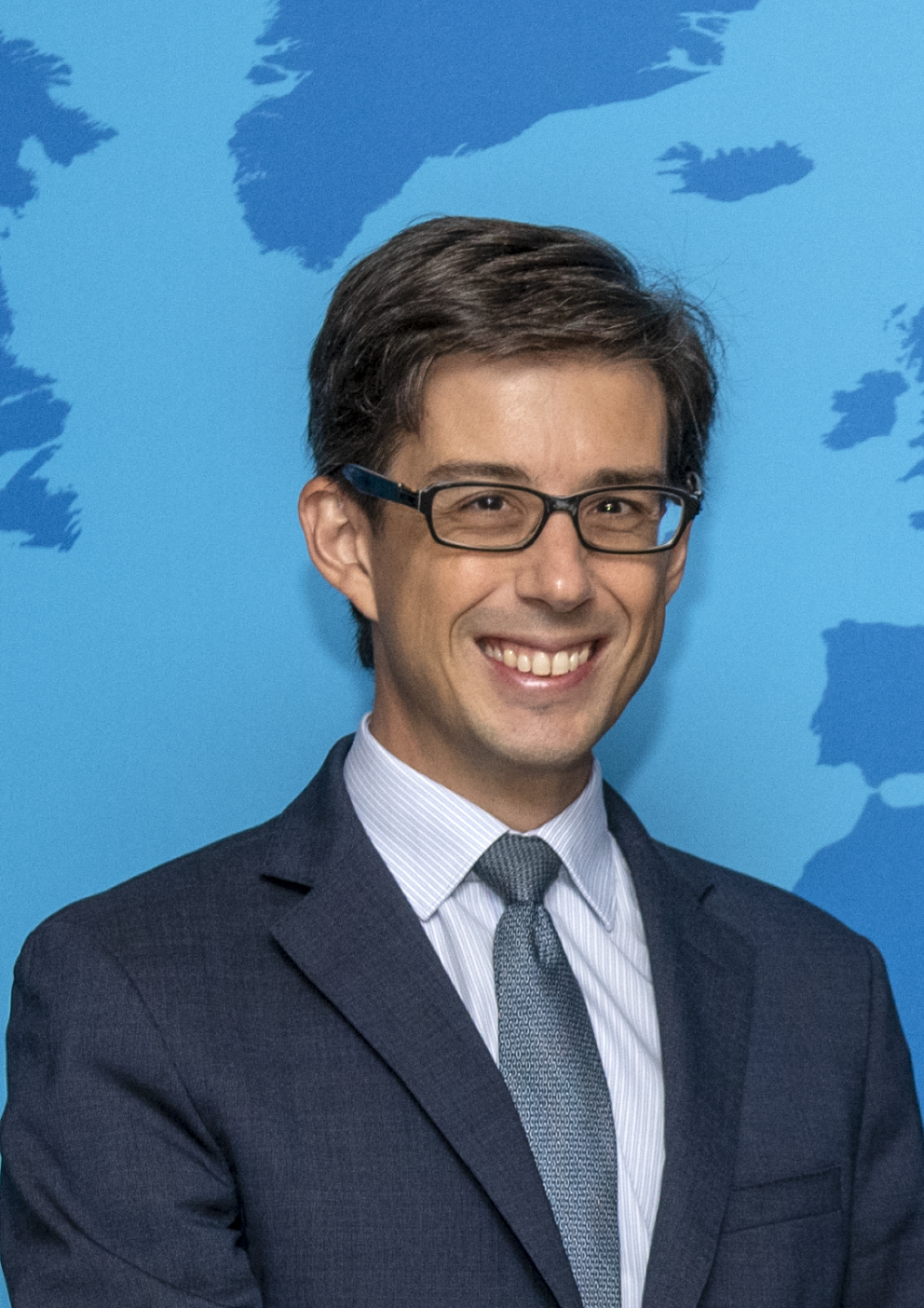
- Vassy in 2019

Director of Sciences Po
- Incumbent
- Assumed office 20 September 2024
- Preceded by: Mathias Vicherat; Jean Bassères (interim)

Ambassador of France to the Netherlands Permanent representative of France to the OPCW
- In office 9 September 2019 – 27 October 2022
- Preceded by: Philippe Lalliot
- Succeeded by: François Alabrune

Personal details
- Born: 10 January 1980 (age 46) Fontenay-sous-Bois, France
- Education: Lycée Louis-le-Grand
- Alma mater: ENS Cachan; Sciences Po; ENA

Luis Vassy (born 10 January 1980) is a French high ranking civil servant, diplomat, and director of Sciences Po.

He was the cabinet director to the Minister for Europe and Foreign Affairs between July 2022 and July 2024. Prior to that he served as Ambassador of France to the Netherlands and permanent representative to the Organisation for the Prohibition of Chemical Weapons from 2019 until 2022. In September 2024, he was named the director of Sciences Po Paris.

== Biography ==
=== Early life and education ===
Vassy was born on 10 January 1980 in Fontenay-sous-Bois, an eastern suburb of Paris in Île-de-France. The son of an Uruguayan agricultural engineer father and an Argentine legal expert mother, both political refugees, he grew up in low-rent housing in Fontenay-sous-Bois. He studied at the Lycée Louis-le-Grand. He is a graduate of the École normale supérieure Paris-Saclay and Sciences Po. He is an alum of the École nationale d'administration, where he was classmates with future-President of France, Emmanuel Macron and his predecessor at Sciences Po, Mathias Vicherat.

=== Career ===
From July 2022 to July 2024, Vassy was the chief of staff of the ministers of Foreign Affairs Catherine Colonna and Stéphane Séjourné.
