= Jean-Christophe Potton =

French diplomat

Jean-Christophe Potton (Lyon, 13 December 1960) is a French diplomat.

He studied at the Institut d’Études Politiques de Paris (diploma in 1981), Panthéon-Assas University (Master in Political Science, 1983) and the Ecole Nationale d’Administration (graduated June 1987).

Since November 2009 he is the French ambassador in Montevideo.

== Biography ==
Jean-Christophe Potton, senior advisor to the Court of Auditors, studied at the Paris Institute of Political Studies (graduating in 1981), Paris-Panthéon-Assas University (Master's in Economics, 1983) and the École nationale d’administration (June 1987). Upon graduating from the ENA in 1987, he was appointed to the civil service. He worked at the Ministry of Economy and Finance, within the Directorate of External Economic Relations, as deputy head of the economic expansion office in New York (1991-1994) and as international advisor to the Minister of Economy and Finance and the Minister of Foreign Trade.

In 1998, he was appointed Referendary Advisor to the Cour des Comptes (France). He was assigned to the 6th Chamber, Social Security, and participated in the Court's international activities (international cooperation and external audit of the FAO, UNICEF, UNHCR, OCHA, UNESCO, etc.). He served as Deputy Secretary General of the Court of Auditors from 2006 to 2009.

Appointed French Ambassador to Uruguay from 2009 to 2013, then French Ambassador to Paraguay from May 9, 2014 to October 6, 2017. Since October 2017, he has been senior advisor to the 3rd Chamber, Education and Culture, of the Court of Auditors, a member of the inspection mission for regional and territorial chambers of accounts, and a member of international teams.

He has taught or currently teaches at the Paris Institute of Political Studies, the National School of Administration, and Paris Dauphine University. In November 2019, he published La Piste Bernanos - Paraguay, a novel, with Éditions Temporis, followed by Le Conseiller in 2021, and La tisseuse d'ao po'i in 2023, two other novels, also with Éditions Temporis.
