= Philippe Capron =

French businessman (born 25 May 1958)

- Born: 25 May 1958 (age 68)
- Education: HEC Paris business school Institut d’Etudes Politiques; École nationale d'administration
- Occupations: Businessman and chief financial officer

Philippe Capron (born 25 May 1958) is a French businessman and chief financial officer (CFO) of French transnational services company Veolia.

== Education ==
Capron is a graduate of the HEC Paris business school, of Paris Institut d’Etudes Politiques and of the École nationale d'administration (ENA)

== Career ==
From 1979 to 1981 he was an assistant to the chairman and secretary of the board of directors of Sacilor. In 1985, he became an Inspector of Finance.

Capron was appointed general director of the Banque Duménil Leblé in 1990 before becoming a partner in the strategy consulting firm Bain & Company in 1992.

In 1994 he joined the Euler Group as director of international development and was then appointed chairman and CEO of Euler-SFAC from 1998 to 2000.

In November 2000, he joined the Usinor group as CFO and was also a member of the executive committee until 2002 when he was appointed executive vice president of the Arcelor group.

Capron was appointed to the management board and as chief financial officer of Vivendi in April 2007. He joined Veolia as senior vice president and chief financial officer in 2013.
