= Bruno Deletré =

Bruno Deletré (born 30 April 1961, in Valenciennes) is a French banker and high-ranking official. He is the current CEO of Crédit Foncier de France and member of the BPCE Executive Committee.

== Education ==
Deletré graduated from the École Nationale d'Administration (ENA) in 1987 and the École Polytechnique in 1981.

== Career ==
=== Public sector ===
In 1987, after graduating from the ENA, Bruno Deletré began his career at the Inspection générale des finances (IGF) (General Finance Inspectorate). In 1991, Deletré joined the Direction du Trésor (Directorate of Treasury) and by 1992 he had become the head of the Africa-Zone Franc office. A few years later, between 1995 and 1997, Deletré acted as technical advisor to the cabinet of the Ministry of Economy and Finance where he was responsible for advising on both European and international matters.

In 2008, at the request of Christine Lagarde, the Minister of the Economy in France, Deletré returned to the public sector to draft a bill concerning the organization and management of financial activities in France.

=== Private sector ===
In May 2001, Deletré entered the private sector and joined Dexia Group’s executive board where he oversaw international business and the Project Finance department for Dexia-Crédit Local. Since leaving Dexia in 2008, Deletré has served as Director of BCPE International et Outre-mer and as a member of the Executive Committee. He also joined Credit Foncier as Chief Executive Officer in July 2011.

== Music ==
Deletré spent 12 years from 1965 to 1977 at the Conservatory of Valenciennes (France) as a violinist. In 1989, eleven years after leaving the conservatory, Deletré founded La Chapelle du Hainaut, a vocal ensemble specializing in religious music.
