= Robert Cochet =

Robert Cochet (1903–1988) was a French artist medal engraver, born in 1903. He studied at the École Nationale Supérieure des Beaux-Arts de Paris and specialised in creating designs for medals, coinage and small works in bronze.

Cochet designed several coins, including the Fourth Republic 100 franc piece struck in France at the Monnaie de Paris and Beaumont-le-Roger mints between 1954 and 1958. These are signed with a tiny CR monogram on the front and R Cochet on the reverse. He also designed portraits cameos for sulphide paperweights made by the French glass makers Compagnie des Cristalleries de Baccarat. Subjects include the US President Harry S. Truman. His greatest contribution to the arts was his creation of numerous commemorative and award medals struck in bronze by the Monnaie de Paris, including the French "Defense Passive 1939-1945" medal.

Cochet was awarded a diploma and medal at the 1954 International Exposition in Madrid. He was made a Societaire of the Salon des Artistes Francais and examples of his medals can be found in the collection of The British Museum, Chrysler Museum and Harvard Art Museum.

Cochet designed a portrait medal of Lucien Georges Bazor, which decorates his grave in the Châtenay-Malabry cemetery near Paris.
