= Arnaud Cochet =

French senior civil servant

Prefect of Ain
- Incumbent
- Assumed office 23 August 2016
- Preceded by: Laurent Touvet

Prefect of Allier
- In office 30 April 2014 – 23 August 2016
- Preceded by: Benoît Brocart
- Succeeded by: Pascal Sanjuan

Prefect of Haute-Saône
- In office 16 February 2012 – 30 April 2014
- Preceded by: Éric Freysselinard
- Succeeded by: François Hamet

Personal details
- Born: 2 July 1959 (age 67) Dinan, Côtes-d'Armor; French Republic
- Education: National Treasury School; École nationale d'administration; University of Montpellier
- Occupation: Official

Arnaud François Christian Cochet (born 2 July 1959 in Dinan, France) is a French senior civil servant. He is currently serving as Prefect of the Department of Ain.

== Honours and decorations ==
=== National honours ===
Ribbon bar	Honour
	Knight of the National Order of the Legion of Honour
	Knight of the National Order of Merit

=== Ministerial honours ===
Ribbon bar	Honour
	Knight of the Order of Agricultural Merit
