= French Development Agency =

Development agency in France

- Native name: Agence française de développement
- Type: Public Industrial and Commercial Institution and Financial Institution
- Founded: 1941
- Founder: Charles de Gaulle
- Headquarters: 5 rue Roland-Barthes, Paris, France
- Key people: Christophe Lecourtier
- Brands: Shaping Sustainable Futures
- Services: Development assistance
- Number of employees: 3,000 (2020)
- Subsidiaries: PROPARCO

The French Development Agency (French: Agence française de développement, AFD) is a public French financial institution that supports and complements France's diplomacy. Active in Africa, Asia, the Middle East, Latin America, the Indo-Pacific, the Caribbean, and France's overseas territories, AFD finances and supports projects that aim to improve living conditions, foster economic growth, and protect the planet. Its 2,600 staff members are based in Paris, Marseille, and a network of 85 offices worldwide.

== History ==
AFD logo from 2010 to 2016

AFD's origins go back to the Caisse Centrale de la France Libre (CCFL), created by Charles de Gaulle on 2 December 1941 and successively renamed the Caisse Centrale de la France d'Outre-Mer (CCFOM) in February 1944 and the Caisse Centrale de Coopération Économique (CCCE) in 1958. By 1967, the CCCE had lost all the money-issuing duties that had been at the origin of the CCFL, but had expanded the development financing that the CCFOM had acquired in 1944.

In 1992, the CCCE was renamed the Caisse Française de Développement. With the reform of French development cooperation in 1998, the CFD became Agence Française de Développement.

In addition to a marked increase in its financing, between 2001 and 2010, there was a diversification in the financial instruments used by AFD: grants, of course, but also highly "concessional" loans or loans without interest subsidies, investment funds, guarantee funds and partnerships. AFD can provide loan recipients with liquidity to finance, at attractive rates – due to the AAA rating, the highest for long-term issuances, given to AFD by the international rating agencies –, their investment policies or programs when markets are unable to meet their needs.

In 2013, Anne Paugam took over from Dov Zerah as CEO. She is the first woman to head AFD. In 2014, The Act on Development and International Solidarity recognized the importance of the work conducted by AFD towards France's international commitments. In 2015, Gaël Giraud became AFD's Chief Economist. In 2016, Rémy Rioux took over as CEO from Anne Paugam. A new French law enacted in 2021 established the AFD Group, bringing together Proparco, Expertise France, and AFD.

In May 2026, Christophe Lecourtier, has been officially appointed as Chief Executive Officer of Agence Française de Développement (AFD).

== AFD's framework for activity ==
=== General legal framework ===
As a specialized credit institution, AFD is subject to banking law, particularly in the field of risk sharing. AFD is a public financial institution. The Government has entrusted it with the role of the main operator for France's cooperation policy. It thereby combines the functions of development bank and implementing agency for France's Official Development Assistance policy.

=== AFD and French government's policy ===
AFD has a contract of objectives and policies with the state and implements the orientations defined by the Inter-ministerial Committee for International Cooperation and Development (CICID), chaired by the Prime Minister.

- "Contribute to the implementation of the state's official development assistance policy abroad"
- "Contribute to the development of France's overseas departments and territories, as well as New Caledonia."

In overseas France, AFD conducts a policy, on behalf of the state, to support public authorities and finance the economy. This mandate was reaffirmed during the first Inter-ministerial Committee for Overseas France, chaired by the French president, which was held in November 2009.

=== Governance ===
Its board of directors comprises a chairperson and 16 members appointed by a decree, including 6 representatives of the State: Ministry of the Economy, Industry and Digital Affairs, Ministry of Foreign Affairs and International Development, Ministry of the Interior, Ministry of Overseas France.

== Operations ==
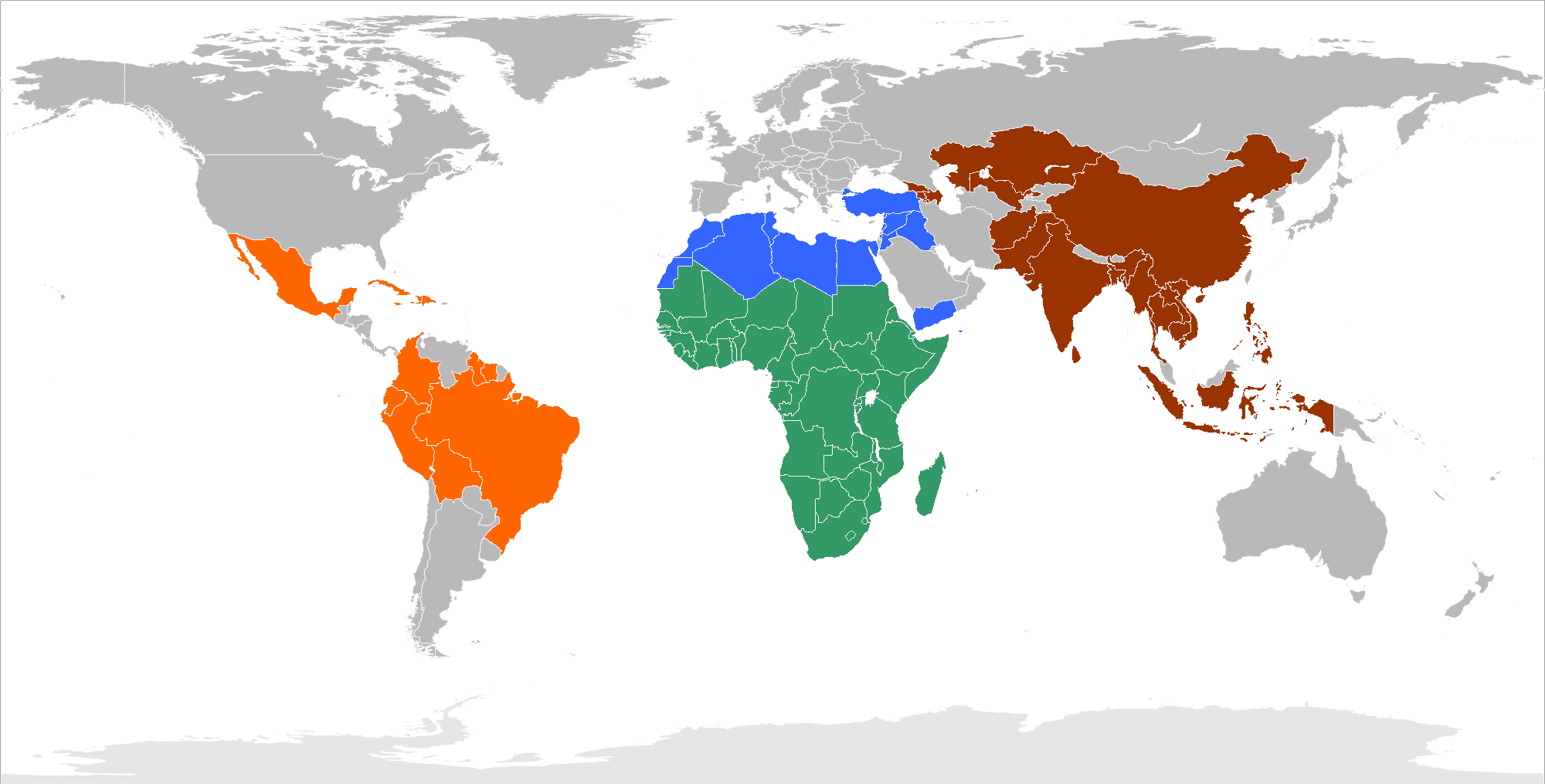
Countries of operation, 2015. Subsaharan Africa Latin America and the Caribbean Asia Middle East and North Africa

The French Development Agency (AFD) implements the policy defined by the French Government. It works to combat poverty and promote sustainable development.

It achieves this by financing and supporting projects that improve living conditions for populations, promote economic growth and protect the planet.

In 2014, AFD allocated EUR 8.1bn to finance projects, including EUR 6.35bn in developing countries and EUR 1.55bn for overseas France.

=== Sectors ===
In 2014, AFD allocated some EUR 767m to education and health and invested over EUR 633m in water and sanitation programs. Projects related to territorial development benefited from over EUR 4bn, i.e. almost half AFD's commitments, with projects in the energy, transport and telecommunications sectors in rural and urban areas. For 2014, the breakdown for commitments by sector is as follows:

- 22% in the productive sector,
- 27% in infrastructure and urban development,
- 21% in energy,
- 2% in biodiversity and natural resources,
- 8% in water and sanitation,
- 9% in education and health,
- 2% in agriculture and food security.
- 7% is divided among various sectors.

=== Development and climate change ===
AFD also operates in emerging countries for issues related to the protection of the environment and energy management.

In a crosscutting manner to these sectors, in 2014, AFD earmarked 53% of its international activity for the fight against climate change, i.e. EUR 2.8bn, which financed development projects that also have a positive impact on the climate.

AFD, via the projects it finances and several initiatives, is gearing up for the 21st Conference of the Parties (COP21) to the United Nations Framework Convention on Climate Change (UNFCCC). For example, with the GoodPlanet Foundation, it is putting on a photo exhibition "60 SOLUTIONS Against Climate Change", which presents concrete, innovative and effective initiatives in four sectors that combine climate change and economic development.,

=== Geographical areas of operation ===
AFD has been working for over sixty years to promote development in Southern countries and the French overseas territories. It is active in the field in over 90 countries, where it finances and supports projects that improve living conditions for populations, promote economic growth and protect the planet: getting children into school, assisting farmers, financing small businesses, water supply, tropical forest conservation, combating climate change... AFD's strategy is guided by sustainable development. Its operations are in line with the Millennium Development Goals, at the intersection of the objectives of economic growth, poverty reduction and environmental conservation.

A wide range of financial and technical instruments meet the different needs of countries: grants, guarantees, equity investments, subsidized loans, loans on market terms and technical assistance.

It develops financial and intellectual partnerships with other donors and contributes, in conjunction with its supervisory authorities, to public policymaking and to France's influence in the development sphere.

==== Latin America and Caribbean ====
In Latin America and the Caribbean, AFD promotes sustainable and equitable development through green and inclusive growth. There are a number of projects to fight climate change, for urban development, as well as projects to promote social convergence.

==== Sub-Saharan Africa ====
Sub-Saharan Africa is the priority region for France's public development policy. In 2014, AFD invested EUR 2.95bn in the region, i.e. 36.5% of its total financing. Among the many projects, a number focus on promoting access to essential services, the growth of sustainable cities, the development of infrastructure, family farming and job-creating enterprises, as well as on the preservation of natural resources.

==== Asia ====
In Asia, AFD works to promote environmental and regional balances, with a focus on projects that limit the environmental footprint of cities or contribute to regional convergence.

==== Mediterranean and Middle East ====
AFD supports the region's political and economic transition, with a focus on promoting Euro-Mediterranean integration, territorial development and job creation. The AFD also funds restoration works, such as that of the Saint Hilarion monastery which the AFD funded in order to have the Byzantine-era site inscribed in the UNESCO World Heritage Sites list.

==== Overseas France ====
Since 1946, AFD has had a public service mandate to provide a reference public service provision for credit and social housing. In 2014, overseas France accounted for 19% of AFD's activity, i.e. EUR 1.55bn. AFD conducts several types of action in overseas France. Its activities are based on the following areas: financing and assisting public policies, advisory services for local authorities, promoting business competitiveness and job creation, supporting regional integration and action for sustainable development. This involves financing and supporting projects that improve living conditions for populations and promote economic growth, while preserving the environment. Thanks to its financing, its expertise and its knowledge production, it assists the local public sector, finances companies, housing and urban development, and supports regional cooperation.

It fulfills this mandate through nine agencies throughout the overseas territories: French Guiana, French Polynesia, Guadeloupe, Martinique, Mayotte, New Caledonia, Réunion, Saint Pierre and Miquelon, Wallis and Futuna.

In the overseas departments (DOM), in Saint Martin, Saint Barthélemy and Saint Pierre and Miquelon, AFD also represents the public investment bank Bpifrance, which finances the creation, innovation, investments and international development of French SMEs.

AFD is the reference shareholder in seven social housing companies (Simar in Martinique, Sic in New Caledonia, Sig in Guadeloupe, SIDR in Réunion, Siguy and Simko in French Guiana and Sim in Mayotte). These property companies promote, manage and build social housing.

Finally, it provides part of the staff of the note-issuing banks, Institut d'Emission d'Outre-mer and Institut d'Emission des Départements d'Outre-mer.

=== Knowledge production ===
Knowledge production is a major activity for AFD and aims to contribute to the definition of the public policies of France and its partners. It has become an essential complement to the financial and technical tools. AFD's knowledge production started to play an important role in the 2000s. This drive for knowledge production is based on the organization of seminars and conferences, training given by CEFEB, a studies and research program, and the establishment of partnerships with academic and research institutes.

AFD also offers a number of publications on developing countries and the French overseas territories:

- Afrique Contemporaine, a sociological, political and economic review on Africa;
- The Working Papers series, which reports on ongoing research;
- The ExPost publications;
- The Focales series, which describes practical case studies (projects, partnerships, experiments...) and puts them into perspective;
- The A Savoir series, which gathers either literature reviews or existing knowledge on issues that present an operational interest;
- The Recherches series, which presents research actions initiated or led by AFD;
- The Conférences et Séminaires series, which provides a wide audience of readers with the main outcomes and lessons learned from the research conducted by AFD and its partner development assistance actors;
- The MacroDev series, which provides analyses focused on a country, region, or on macroeconomic issues related to development processes;
- Publications co-edited with the World Bank;
- Other co-publications;
- Regards sur la Terre, the annual sustainable development report coordinated by AFD and IDDRI;
- The Ideas for Development blog, a forum for exchanges coordinated by AFD, open to development actors and the public interested in development.

All this contributes to improving knowledge of the Official Development Assistance policy: "its rationale, its effectiveness, its interactions with the other public policies, its role in the management of globalization" AFD's aim is to become an internationally recognized research center, both in terms of sustainable development and global public goods, and the design of innovative financing instruments.

== Leadership ==
	Name	CEO start date	CEO end date
Caisse centrale de la France Libre (CCFL)	André Diethelm	2 December 1941	24 November 1942
Caisse centrale de la France Libre (CCFL)	Pierre Denis	25 November 1942	29 December 1944
Caisse centrale de la France d'Outre-mer (CCFOM)	André Postel-Vinay	30 December 1944	9 January 1973
Caisse Centrale de Coopération Économique (CCCE)	Claude Panouillot	10 January 1973	2 August 1979
Caisse Centrale de Coopération Économique (CCCE)	Yves Roland-Billecart	3 August 1979	25 April 1989
Caisse française de développement (CFD)	Philippe Jurgensen	26 April 1989	24 April 1995
Caisse française de développement (CFD)	Antoine Pouillieute	25 April 1995	25 April 2001
Agence française de développement (AFD)	Jean-Michel Severino	26 April 2001	1 June 2010
Agence française de développement (AFD)	Dov Zerah	2 June 2010	29 May 2013
Agence française de développement (AFD)	Anne Paugam	3 June 2013	1 June 2016
Agence française de développement (AFD)	Rémy Rioux	2 June 2016	11 May 2026
Agence française de développement (AFD)	Christophe Lecourtier	12 May 2026	

== Controversy ==
In 2007, AFD was called into question for its support for French companies suspected of contributing to deforestation in Central Africa. However, no legal proceedings were brought against AFD.

AFD has strict procedures during project appraisal for impact control and measurement in terms of social and environmental responsibility. It has provided EUR 900,000 of financing to the Central Africa Forest Commission (COMIFAC), which is responsible for guiding, coordinating, harmonizing and taking decisions in terms of the conservation and sustainable management of forest ecosystems. Mr. Joyandet, French Secretary of State for Cooperation and Francophonie from March 2008 to July 2010, criticized the Chief Executive Officer at the time, Mr. Severino, for AFD's emergency-oriented approach, without a long term-vision and a certain lack of scope. However, the Minister's remarks did not gain wide consensus among the development community.

According to the Cameroon National Anti-corruption Commission (CONAC), two front companies, including one controlled by AFD, have been suspected of fraud. In December 2013, CONAC presented its 2012 activity report in Yaoundé, indicating that over CFA 113bn had been misappropriated from the cotton development company (SODECOTON) between 2002 and 2011.

In December 2021, created under the name Caisse centrale de la France libre in 1941, the public financial institution could change its name again in the coming months, 80 years after its launch. Or a project in the process of reflection, which also includes an overhaul of its operation and its development policy, which "appear unsuitable in relation to our experience", according to its director Rémy Rioux.

== See also ==
- Marketplace on Innovative Financial Solutions for Development
- List of development aid agencies
- List of banks in France
