= Régis Guyot =

French civil servant (born 1949)

- Born: 12 March 1949; Versailles, Yvelines, Île-de-France
- Occupation: French prefect

Régis Guyot (French: [ʁeʒis ɡɥijo]; born 12 March 1949 in Versailles, Yvelines, Île-de-France) is a French civil servant (prefect).

He is a graduate of Institut d’études politiques de Paris (IEP Paris).

== Career ==
- Sub-prefect of arrondissement of Vire (1978) in Vire City
- Sub-prefect of arrondissement of Oloron-Sainte-Marie (1980) in Oloron-Sainte-Marie City
- Sub-prefect of arrondissement of Forbach (1990) in Forbach City
- Prefect of Deux-Sèvres from 2006 to 2009, in Niort City
- Prefect of Ain from 2009 to 2010, in Bourg-en-Bresse City

== Honours and awards ==
- France:
  - Chevalier (Knight) of Légion d’honneur

== Sources, Notes, References ==
- (in French) "Guyot, Régis, Marie, Denis" (prefect, born 1949), page 1069 in Who's Who in France : Dictionnaire biographique de personnalités françaises vivant en France et à l’étranger, et de personnalités étrangères résidant en France, 44th edition for 2013 edited in 2012, 2371 p., 31 cm, ISBN 978-2-85784-053-4 .
- (in French) http://www.whoswho.fr/bio/regis-guyot_22223 : Who's Who in France on line (access restricted : fee).
- (in French) Jean Orselli, Usages et usagers de la route : requiem pour un million de morts, Éditions L’Harmattan, 2012, 600 p., p. 491.
- (in French) Gilles Gaetner, La république des copains, p. 261, éd. Flammarion, 2005, ISBN 2080687379
- (in French) Claude Got, La violence routière : des mensonges qui tuent, Éditions Tec&Doc Lavoisier, 2008, 162 p. (ISBN 978-2-7430-1086-7), p. 93-94.
- (in French) Alain Larcan et Henri Julien, Le secourisme en France : panorama et perspectives, Éditions Lavoisier, 2011, 138 p. (ISBN 978-2-257-20465-3), p. 106-108.

Régis Guyot French Prefect Born: 1949
Political offices
Preceded by Jean-Jacques Brot	Prefect of Deux-Sèvres; 2006 – 2009	Succeeded by Christiane Barret
Preceded by Pierre Soubelet	Prefect of Ain; 2009 – 2010	Succeeded by Philippe Galli
