= Jean-Michel Severino =

French banker (born 1957)

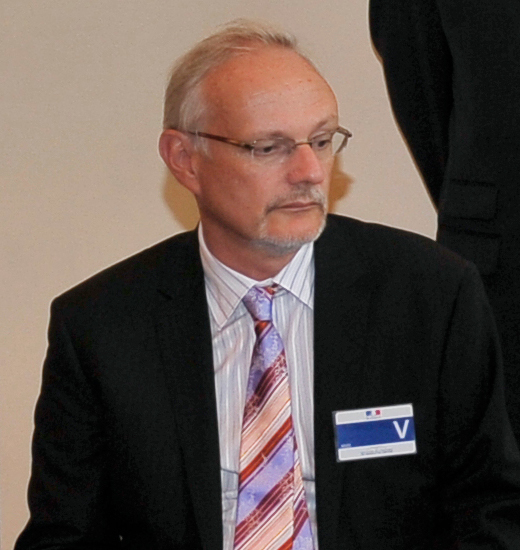
- Severino in 2009
- Born: September 6, 1957 (age 69); France
- Occupation: Banker

Jean-Michel Severino (born 6 September 1957) is a French banker. He has held senior positions in the World Bank, and served for more than nine years as the CEO of France's government agency for international development, AFD. Since 2011 he has been CEO of an investment group, Investisseurs et Partenaires (I&P), and a board member for several private companies.

== Education ==
- 1984 : École nationale d'administration
- 1980 : Institut d'Études Politiques de Paris
- 1979 : Master of Science in Economics, Paris Dauphine University
- 1978 : Ecole Supérieure de Commerce de Paris and Bachelor of Laws (Université Paris I Sorbonne)

== Career ==
Severino served as Director of France's international development agency - Agence française de développement (AFD). He was appointed in 2001 for a three-year term, renewed in 2004 and 2007. He was previously Director in charge of international development at the French Ministry of Cooperation, then Vice President for Asia at the World Bank.

In 2006, United Nations Secretary-General Kofi Annan appointed Severino to a High-level Panel on United Nations Systemwide Coherence, which was set up to explore how the United Nations system could work more coherently and effectively across the world in the areas of development, humanitarian assistance and the environment. In October 2007, he launched the blog Ideas4development alongside Josette Sheeran, Donald Kaberuka, Kemal Dervis, Pascal Lamy, Abdou Diouf and Supachai Panitchpakdi, in which the authors share their visions, doubts and hopes for international development.

Severino regularly publishes articles in the French and international press.

== Positions ==
- 2001-2010 : CEO - Agence française de développement, Paris. President of PROPARCO, Paris.
- 2000 : General Inspector of Finances - Ministry of the Economy and Finances, Paris
- 1997-2000 : Vice-president for Asia - World Bank, Washington
- 1996-1997 : Director for Central Europe - World Bank, Washington
- 1994-1996 : Director in charge of international development - Ministry of Cooperation and Development, Paris
- 1990-1994 : Chief of geographic coordination - Ministère Ministry of Cooperation and Development, Paris
- 1988-1990 : Technical advisor for economic and financial affairs - Cabinet of the Minister of Cooperation and Development, Jacques Pelletier
- 1984 : Inspector of Finances, Ministry of the Economy and Finances, Paris

== Career in the private sector ==
- Danone, Member of the Board of Directors
- EBI SA Groupe Ecobank, Chairman of the Board of Directors
- Orange S.A., Independent Member of the Board of Directors
- PhiTrust Impact Investors, Member of the Board of Directors
- Fondation Grameen Crédit Agricole, Member of the Board of Directors

Severino was a close ally of Emmanuel Faber in moving Danone toward a greater concern with environmental and social priorities as against immediately commercial ones: a project that resulted in the ouster of Faber by activist shareholders in March 2021.

== Publications ==
- "The End of ODA : Death and Rebirth of a Global Public Policy", written with Olivier Ray. Center for Global Development Working Paper, March 2009.
- "Il est urgent que l'Europe développe une vision planétaire", article published in Le Figaro, June 2009.
- "Gouvernance mondiale - Illusoire quête du Léviathan ? ", written with Olivier Ray and published in La gouvernance démocratique, un nouveau paradigme pour le développement ? (Karthala, 2008).
- L'Aide Publique au Développement, book written with avec Olivier Charnoz (2007), Editions La Découverte, Paris.
- "Le secteur privé, un levier du développement à ne pas négliger", article by Claude Bébéar, Henri Proglio, Franck Riboud et Jean-Michel Severino, published in Le Figaro, December 2008.
- "De l'ordre global à la justice globale : vers une politique mondiale de régulation", tomes I et II, articles written with Olivier Charnoz, En temps Réel, Cahiers n°33 et 36, May and November 2008.
- "Heart of darkness", article written with Donald Kaberuka and published in Emerging Markets, October 2008.
- "Feeding Africa", article by Jean-Michel Severino and Jacques Diouf, published in the International Herald Tribune, Octobre 2007.
- "There's much ground to make up, but the reform of EU aid is now under way", article published in Europe's World, Septembre 2007.
- "Solving the water equation", article by Jean-Michel Severino and Mikhael Gorbachev, distributed by Project Syndicate in June 2007.
- "Cultivating Energy", article distributed by Projet Syndicate, December 2006.

Most of Severino's publications are posted on the website of the Agence française de développement: Articles2007, Articles2008
