= Philippe Galli =

French prefect

Philippe Galli (born 8 July 1956, Strasbourg) is a French prefect.

== Biography ==
He graduated from ENA (École nationale d'administration) in 1988.

He has been the prefect of Seine-Saint-Denis since June 2013. He was also prefect of Corrèze (2005–2008), prefect of Loir-et-Cher (2008–2010) and prefect of Ain (2010-2013).

Philippe Galli French Prefect Born: 1956
Political offices
Preceded by Nicolas Basselier	Prefect of Corrèze; 2005 – 2008	Succeeded by Alain Zabulon
Preceded by Pierre Pouëssel	Prefect of Loir-et-Cher; 2008 – 2010	Succeeded by Nicolas Basselier
Preceded by Régis Guyot	Prefect of Ain; 2010 – 2013	Succeeded by Laurent Touvet
