= Vehicle insurance in France =

Compensation-based insurance for policyholder land vehicles in France

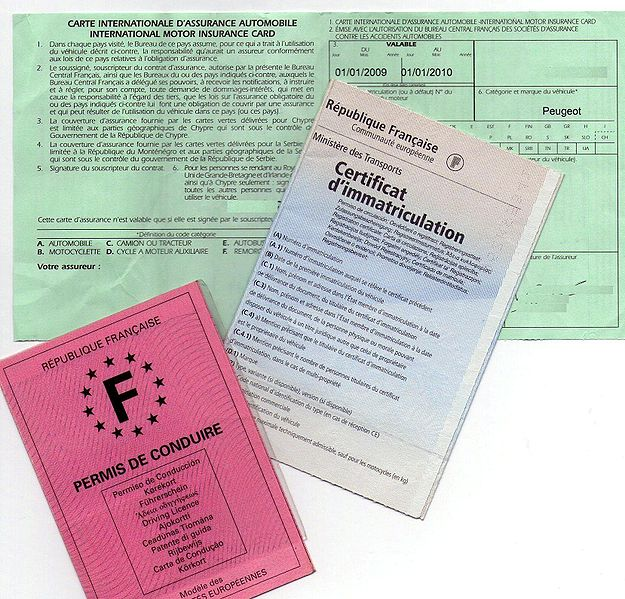
Insurance certificate, Carte grise and driver's license.

Vehicle insurance in France is a compensation-based insurance policy for terrestrial motor vehicles that are insured in France and circulate on French territory, as well as in the European Economic Area and the Green Card zone.

It has been compulsory since 1958, and is governed by the French Insurance Code. Its main purpose is to provide financial support in the event of losses sustained by an insured person or a third party, particularly in the event of a traffic collision, but also for damage sustained outside the context of traffic.

Insurance companies offer a wide range of policies and cover. Each contract is specific to a particular situation. Whether it's the vehicle, the cover chosen, the policyholder or the insurance company.

Insurance contracts only take effect when a crash occurs. In this case, compensation is paid on the basis of the insured's declaration, the completed crash statement, the expert's report and the terms of the contract.

Vehicle insurance represents a major part of the insurance market.

== Insurance obligation ==
=== Legislation ===
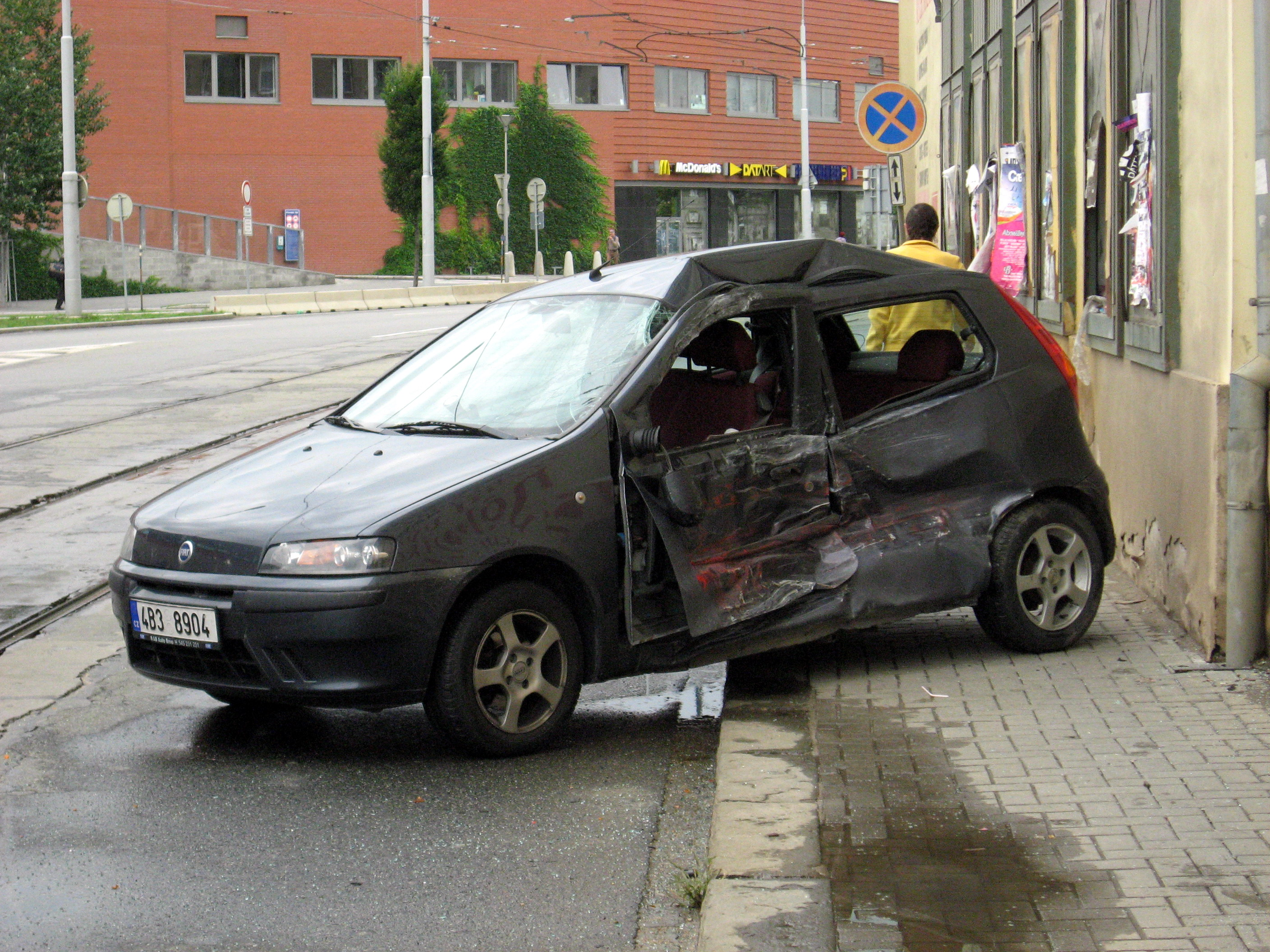
Car crash

Vehicle insurance was made compulsory in France by the law of 27th, February 1958, which is now codified in Title I, Book 2, Regulatory Part of the Insurance Code. Compulsory insurance covers only "civil liability", i.e. damage caused to third parties and passengers.

It must cover the owner of the vehicle, any person having custody of or driving the vehicle, even if unauthorized, and passengers in the insured vehicle. It also covers damage caused by the fall of accessories or objects transported, whether occurring at the time of the fall or afterwards. It also covers unloading and loading operations.

Vehicle liability insurance requires unlimited coverage for bodily injury, with a minimum amount of 1 million euros per vehicle and per material loss.

Drivers, turned down by several insurance companies, can appeal to the Bureau central de tarification. The Bureau will find insurance for the driver.

=== Affected vehicles ===
Vehicle insurance covers "any vehicle designed for the transport of people or goods moving on the ground and powered by a motive force", as well as trailers, including those that are not coupled.

Thus, it covers cars, trucks, motorcycles, scooters, tractors, construction equipment and electric scooters, as well as self-propelled lawnmowers, caravans, trailers, forklift trucks and battery-powered children's buggies (although an isolated ruling by the 2nd Civil Chamber of the French Supreme Court on March 4, 1988, excludes a battery-powered miniature car, a ruling which has been criticized). On the other hand, such vehicles are generally included in home insurance policies.

The notion of registration has no bearing on the obligation to insure.

=== Geographical area ===
Geographical area of countries participating in the green card system.

Vehicle insurance taken out in France allows you to drive in all the countries indicated on your "green card". Depending on the type of insurance, some countries in the green card zone may not be insured - in which case they are crossed out on the green card - but the overseas collectivities and the European Union and European Economic Area form a single, non-optional block.

A car insured in a country in the Green Card zone remains insured (in the Green Card sense) when driving in France, without having to modify its contract. When a car insured in France leaves the Green Card zone, it must take out specific insurance for the country in which it is to be driven. This also applies when a vehicle arrives from a country outside the green card zone, with the exception of state vehicles. It must take out insurance for the period during which it is to be driven in France.

Non-insured vehicles entering France must take out frontier insurance, which can be obtained from customs on entry.

In the event of a claim between a French vehicle and a foreign vehicle in the green card zone, the IRSA convention does not apply, which means that the processing time for claims is much longer. Guarantees and limits will be those of the country where the loss occurs, unless the contract is more favorable.

Insurance can be taken out either in the country where the vehicle is registered, or with an insurance company in the country of residence of the "guardian".

For stays of more than three months outside France, it's advisable to take out insurance in the country where the stay is taking place.

=== Credentials ===
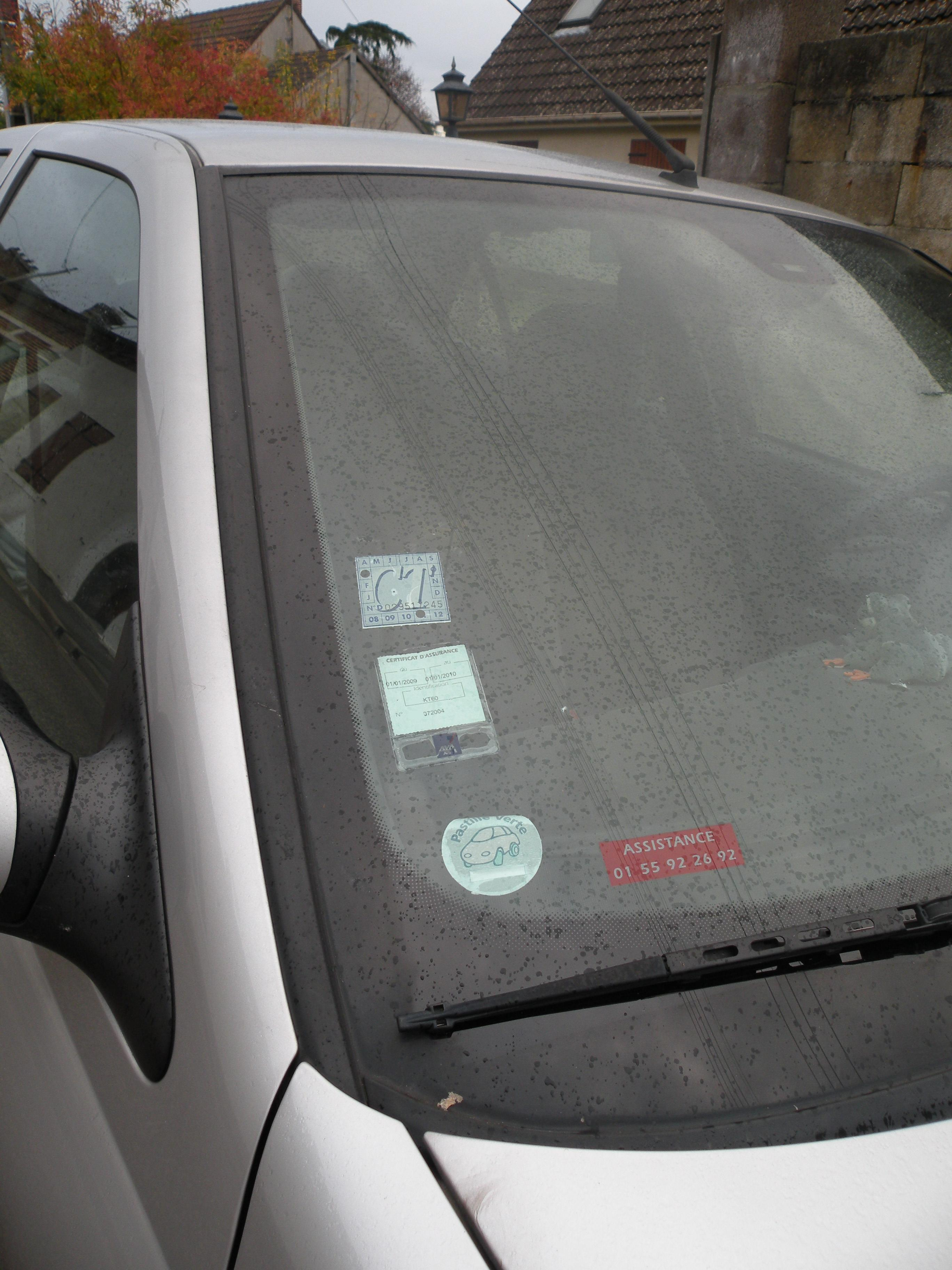
Insurance certificate on a windscreen (below the technical inspection certificate).

The green card is a document that serves as a presumption of compliance with the insurance obligation. It is accompanied by the insurance certificate, which must be affixed to the vehicle's windshield. The green card also specifies all the countries in which the insurance is valid.

The information statement is a document issued by the insurance company at the policyholder's request, detailing his or her bonus and claims record over the last five years. It must specify the driver(s) named in the contract, the nature of the claims (bodily injury or material damage) and the driver's share of responsibility, the identity of the at-fault driver, the coverage period and the reduction/increase coefficient at the anniversary date.

== History ==
=== Chronology of vehicle insurance in France ===
The history of Vehicle insurance in France began in 1929, with the creation of the French Central Bureau of Insurance Companies for the study of automobile crash statistics. On July 13, 1930, in light of the increase in automobile traffic, the legislature decided to regulate vehicle insurance.

As World War II came to an end, road traffic increased, as did the number of casualties. To raise public awareness, insurance companies, with the help of the Union Routière de France, took the initiative in 1949 of creating the Prévention Routière. This organization's mission is to encourage, study and implement measures aimed at reducing the frequency and severity of traffic violence. It set up an information and public awareness network. In 1972, it was reinforced by the Comité Interministériel de la Sécurité Routière (Interministerial Road Safety Committee). Its aim was to make road users aware of the risk factors associated with driving: speed, alcohol, non-use of seat belts, fatigue, etc.

At the time, insurance was not compulsory, which meant that victims could find themselves doubly injured in the event of a serious bodily injury crash: if the drivers responsible did not have the means to compensate the victims themselves, the latter would not only have to bear the cost of their injuries, but also receive no compensation. To put an end to this injustice, the law of December 31, 1951 created the Fonds de garantie automobile (FGA). Its purpose was to pay compensation to victims of personal injury crashes caused by vehicles whose drivers were unknown, uninsured or insolvent. The FGA's financial limits soon became apparent. Most cars were insured, although two-wheelers had the least coverage rates and were the most exposed to serious injury. Six years later, on 27 February 1958, legislators decided to make Vehicle insurance compulsory for all.

In 1955, the Bureau commun automobile (BCA) was created, bringing together independent automobile adjusters to rapidly estimate the cost of claims on behalf of insurance companies. The BCA succeeded the 1954 Convention Expertise. However, the adjusting profession did not organize itself until 1972.

On May 1, 1968, the Convention d'Indemnité Direct des Assurances (IDA) was introduced, enabling insurance companies to compensate policyholders directly, without waiting for the outcome of a more lengthy recourse procedure under ordinary law. The convention introduced a liability scale to simplify procedures between insurance companies. This agreement facilitated the processing of almost 80% of claims. In 1974, it became the Convention inter sociétés de règlement des sinistres automobile (IRSA).

To reward good drivers and penalize bad ones, the legislator introduced the bonus-malus system on June 11, 1976. However, its existence was challenged by the Brussels Commission, which considered that it undermined free competition and contravened the third directive regulating non-life insurance, which came into force on July 1, 1994. But on September 8, 2004, the European Court of Justice ruled in favor of the French system.

On October 1, 1977, the application of the Convention d'indemnisation des accidents corporels (IDAC) came into force, with the aim of improving the time taken to compensate bodily injury claims.

In the wake of the Charoy affair, public authorities realized that members of the driver's or insured's family were not automatically insured in the same way as third parties. Indeed, Article L. 211-1 § 5 of the French Insurance Code did not consider them to be third parties until January 7, 1981. Prior to this law, if the driver did not take out special insurance for his family, its members were not compensated in the event of a crash. The change in the law in their favor meant that passengers were systematically insured, without having to take out a special option.

On July 13, 1982, all insurance contracts covering damage to property were required to include cover against natural disasters.

In the event of a traffic crash, ordinary civil liability under articles 1382 and following of the French Civil Code applied. This posed problems when it came to establishing a fair system of compensation for bodily injury, as the driver may be totally or partially exonerated from liability in the event of an extraneous cause.

On July 21, 1982, the Second Civil Chamber of the French Supreme Court (Cour de Cassation) handed down a controversial ruling known as the "Desmares ruling", launching an all-or-nothing policy to the detriment of victims. If the victim was at fault, he or she had no recourse against the driver. Added to this is the fact that the number of people injured on the roads is rising, approaching 300,000 a year. Some judges refused to apply this ruling, creating an imbalance between courts. To ensure that no traffic violence victim went without compensation, the Badinter Law was passed on July 5, 1985, and came into force on January 1, 1986.

On January 1, 1986, the Convention d'indemnisation pour le compte d'autrui (ICA) was introduced. It was succeeded on April 1, 2002, by the Convention d'indemnisation et de recours corporel automobile (IRCA).

The Vehicle Insurance Fund was being overstretched by claims caused by uninsured drivers. As a result, the legislator made it compulsory to display the insurance sticker on vehicles from September 9, 1986, onwards. This made it easier to monitor compliance with the insurance obligation and to impose more effective penalties.

On June 25, 1990, the law made it compulsory for fire coverage in vehicle insurance contracts to also cover damage caused by various types of storms, including tropical cyclones.

As of 2018, private insurance and license plate files are to be cross-referenced to enable the authorities to monitor insurance automatically.

== Coverages ==
A wide range of coverage options are available when taking out a Vehicle insurance policy. These are independent of each other, both in terms of underwriting and application. In the event of an at-fault crash, for example, even if there is no "all-risks" cover, the assistance, driver's safety and defense coverage will still work. Similarly, comprehensive cover does not necessarily mean that assistance or other options have been taken out.

=== Public liability ===
The minimum cover is third-party automobile liability, which differs from private liability. In everyday language, this is known as "third-party" insurance. This covers only damage caused to other property or persons, i.e. to vehicles that have been involved in a collision, injuries to vehicle users other than the at-fault driver, such as pedestrians, and damage to material goods of all kinds (lampposts, walls, buildings, etc.). In the event of a collision with an at-fault third party, that person's insurance covers the damage.

In the event of a fire originating in the insured vehicle, this coverage includes damage to a building. It also covers any damage that may occur as a result of theft, for a period of one month from the date the theft was reported.

Most insurance companies cover damage caused by a trailer weighing less than 750 kg, but only during towing, as specified in the contract's general conditions.

=== Defense recourse ===
Defense and recourse cover is often inseparable from third-party liability cover, as its purpose is to provide amicable or legal defense and recourse on behalf of the insured against injured or liable third parties following a claim.

The insurance must provide the policyholder with counsel and a free choice of lawyer, as well as cover the costs of legal proceedings, bailiffs and expert appraisals.

It can be complemented by legal expenses insurance.

=== Driver safety ===
Driver's safety covers bodily injury to the driver when he or she is at fault, or when there is no identified third party. It can be compared to "individual accident" insurance. It can either be included in the automobile contract, or taken out separately. In fact, damage suffered by the driver is excluded from the Badinter Law compensation system. It often includes a disability deductible, which means that coverage only applies in the event of serious bodily injury.

Coverage is provided for medical expenses incurred as a result of the crash, loss of income due to disability, home improvement costs such as the installation of a ramp, and the wages of home helps due to loss of independence. In the event of death, funeral expenses may be reimbursed, or a fixed lump sum or annuity may be paid.

=== Assistance ===
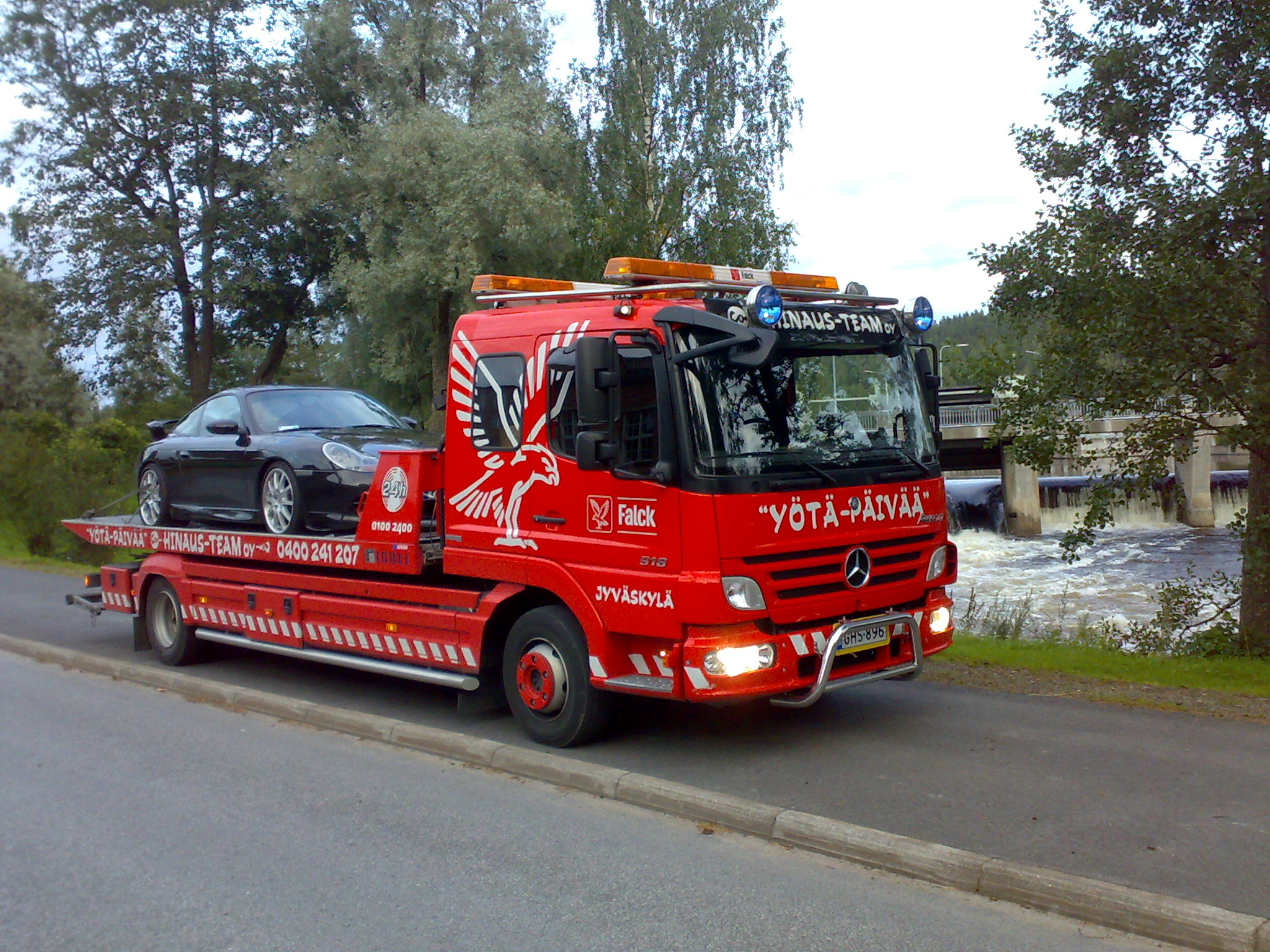
A tow truck.

The purpose of vehicle assistance is to arrange and pay for the towing of a vehicle and the transport of its passengers in France or abroad, in the event of a crash or breakdown. This assistance can be extended to other people, even in the absence of a vehicle-related event. Some companies offer coverage for replacement of the parts that caused the breakdown. Coverage may be limited by a cap, but also by a mileage deductible. Indeed, some insurers will only cover towing if the insured is more than a certain distance from home.

=== Broken glass ===
Broken glass coverage covers the repair or replacement of glass parts on a vehicle, i.e. side windows, windscreen, rear window, and may be extended to include headlight lenses, sunroofs and rear-view mirrors, depending on the company. For two-wheeled vehicles, the term used is "bris d'optique" (glass breakage).

Broken glass coverage often has its own deductible, which may be different if it's just a question of repairing an impact or replacing a glass part.

In the event of damage to a glass part of the car, insurance companies have set up two procedures for the customer to have the damaged part repaired or replaced. Either the customer goes to a repairer of his choice, pays the full bill and sends it to his insurance company for reimbursement, less any deductible. Or they can go to an approved repairer, who will be reimbursed and paid directly by the insurance company, to avoid the customer having to pay the full cost of repairs in advance.

=== Natural disasters, technological catastrophes ===
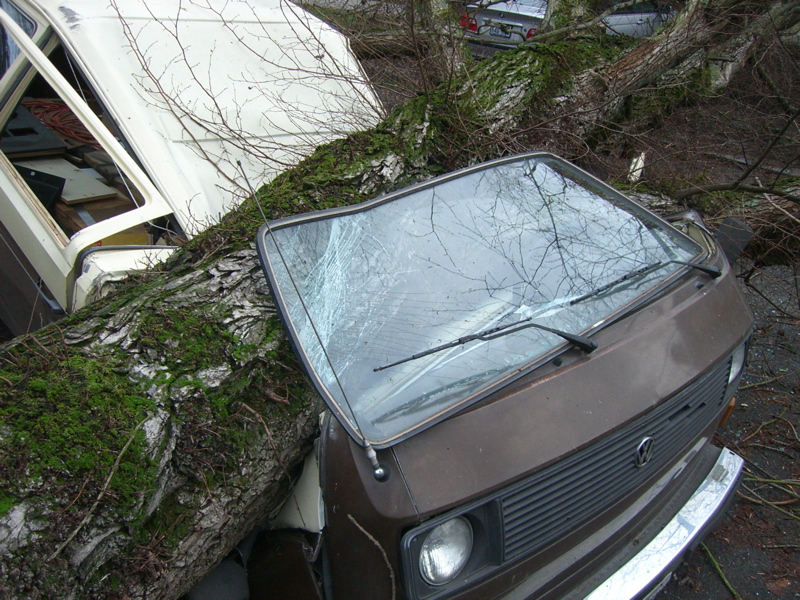
A car crushed by a tree following a storm.

Coverage for damage to vehicles caused by natural or technological disasters is compulsory for all property insurance policies, such as broken glass. To activate this coverage, an interministerial decree must be published in the Journal Officiel.

=== Theft, fire and related guarantees ===
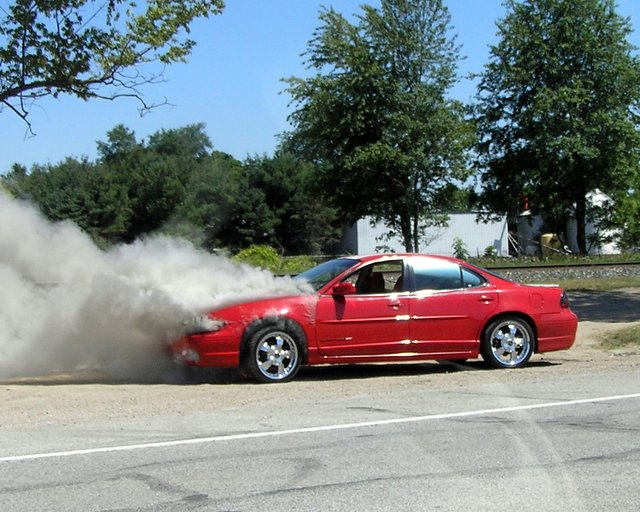
A car fire.

Theft coverage covers damage to the vehicle in the event of total, partial or attempted theft: the insured is reimbursed for the value of the vehicle, after a minimum delay of 30 days. If the vehicle is recovered within this period, it is automatically reimbursed if it can be economically repaired.

If only parts or accessories are missing, the parts are replaced as long as the cost of repair does not exceed the price of the vehicle.

An insurance company may provide for a reduction in compensation if the insured vehicle is stolen with the keys in it.

Theft coverage does not cover any fraud that may occur during the sale or purchase of a vehicle.

To prevent a claim, the insurance company may impose preventive measures on the insured, such as the purchase of an approved anti-theft device for motorcycles, etching of windows, or regular parking in a closed area (garage or underground parking lot).

Fire insurance covers damage to the vehicle caused by fire, whether arson or mechanical, as well as lightning, explosion, terrorist attacks and acts of terrorism. If the loss is due to a fire, the third-party liability coverage of the vehicle at fault takes care of the damage to third parties, while the fire coverage takes care of the damage to the vehicle at fault.

Coverage for climatic events (extratropical cyclone and tropical cyclones) is included in fire insurance.

=== Collision damage ===
Collision coverage pays for damage to the insured's vehicle, even if the driver is at fault, but only if there is an identified third party. This coverage does not apply if the insured has a crash alone, or in the case of vandalism.

Coverage is also available in the event of collision with an animal, a pedestrian or a car, but only if the owner is identifiable. This excludes compensation for damage in the event of a collision with wildlife or a hit-and-run crash.

=== All-risk ===
All-risk cover, commonly referred to as "comprehensive", covers all damage to the vehicle, including vandalism, hit-and-run crashes, collisions with wild animals and crashes for which the driver is responsible.

=== Others ===
- Contents insurance covers everything left inside the car: personal effects (clothing), luggage, small equipment (e.g. car radio, GPS), business equipment.
- Loss of value or purchase value covers the loss of value of the vehicle. If the vehicle is totally destroyed, it can reimburse the vehicle's purchase value, or add a flat-rate supplement or a percentage based on the car's value at the time of the loss, or reimburse outstanding installments on a leasing contract.
- Replacement vehicle is the provision of a loan vehicle or rental package to temporarily replace a vehicle that is unusable following a crash, theft or breakdown.
- Accessory coverage covers exterior items added to vehicles, such as tuning.
- Theft or loss of keys may be covered by some insurance companies.

== Insurance contract ==
=== Form ===
Insurance contracts are made up of two distinct elements.

Firstly, the "special conditions", which are specific to each policyholder and contain the information he or she declares. This includes the characteristics of the vehicle insured, the drivers, the premium, the anniversary date and the coverage chosen, etc.

On the other hand, the "general conditions", which must be submitted when the policy is taken out, and which are presented in the form of a guide explaining each benefit in detail, including exclusions and how the policy operates.

=== Types ===
Vehicle insurance policies can vary according to a number of criteria:

==== "Mono-vehicle" contracts ====
It can be used to insure private individuals or companies for cars, two-wheelers, unlicensed vehicles, etc. This is the most widespread form of contract on the market. The rate is adapted to the use of the vehicle: private use or commuting to work, for simple business trips or daily tours. Some insurers offer premium discounts based on annual mileage.

Frontier insurance is designed for foreign vehicles not insured in a country belonging to the green card system and entering French territory.

Vehicles used for sporting purposes, such as competitions or rallies, require special insurance.

==== Fleet contract ====
The "fleet" contract is generally intended for companies with a large number of vehicles.

The "fleet" contract enables companies or individuals with several cars to group all their vehicles under a single contract, thereby reducing the management costs invoiced to the customer. With this type of contract, vehicles can be added to or removed from the policyholder's fleet at any time, without the need for any special modifications to the contract. At each contract expiry date, the company provides the policyholder with a "fleet statement", a list of vehicles insured and those withdrawn from the fleet since the last expiry date.

However, due to inflation in average compensation costs, the reduction in the size of company fleets, and French legislation designed to provide better protection for the victims of personal injury crashes, fleet contracts have seen an increase in rates, which is weighing more and more heavily on companies with fleet management issues.

"Professional automobile" or garage insurance covers all vehicles under the responsibility of an automobile professional. Specific types of insurance are available for goods transported, and for public passenger transport.

=== People covered ===
Any person entitled to drive a vehicle can be named as the principal driver on a Vehicle insurance contract. There may also be secondary drivers named on the contract, such as a spouse or children. Some insurance contracts may have no expressly designated driver. For example, in the case of company cars, all employees can use the vehicle without the insurance company being notified. In certain situations, insurance companies may set "loan of the wheel" deductibles for crashes caused by people not named in the contract, whether for casual driving or for contracts with an exclusive driver.

=== Caps, deductibles, exclusions ===
Insurance coverage is generally limited by caps, deductibles and exclusions.

==== Caps ====
Limit of indemnity, or payout limit, is the maximum amount to which the insurance company commits. They depend on the risk to be insured, and are rarely negotiable. They enable insurance companies to avoid committing themselves to unlimited amounts in the event of an exceptionally large claim, and to better control costs.

==== Deductibles ====
Deductibles are the amounts that remain payable by the insured in the event of a claim. In Vehicle insurance, deductibles are generally absolute and most of the time fixed, but it is possible to have variable deductibles depending on the cost of the claim. The higher the deductible, the lower the premium.

For example, a policyholder whose car is stolen at an estimated cost of €5,000, and who has a €400 deductible, is reimbursed €4,600. But if his deductible is 10% of the damage, he will be reimbursed €4,500.

==== Exclusions ====
Exclusions refer to what is not covered by the contract. They must appear in bold, visible characters. They may be legal or contractual. They are legal, for example, if the insured has voluntarily caused the damage. They may be contractual, as in the case of an exclusion for tire damage, or fuel theft, for example.

Some exclusions are absolute, such as damage suffered by an accomplice in the theft of the vehicle, or exclusions that cannot be enforced against victims, such as failure to observe safety rules (too many passengers).

Drunk driving does not constitute a cause for exclusion from coverage: "Any clause stipulating forfeiture of the insured's coverage in the event of conviction for drunk driving or driving under the influence of alcohol, or for driving after use of substances or plants classified as narcotics, is deemed unwritten". However, "all-risk" coverage may exclude damage to the insured's vehicle caused by driving under the influence of alcohol.

== Premium calculation ==
=== Pricing criteria ===
Vehicle insurance premiums are specific to each situation. Numerous statistical factors come into play: age, length of driving experience and previous driving experience (suspension, cancellation, drunk driving), city of residence, marital status, insurance record (young driver surcharge, accompanied driving reduction, bonus, claims history and company cancellation), profession, vehicle, color, purchase method (cash, credit, leasing). All these elements are used to calculate a net premium, to which are added management fees, taxes and membership fees for mutual insurance companies.

Generally speaking, the more experienced the policyholder, the lower the premium. On the other hand, some companies refuse to take on young drivers, as the frequency of claims is much higher in the first two years.

Following a ruling by the Court of Justice of the European Union on December 21, 2012, insurers can no longer calculate their rates according to the gender of the insured, even though claims statistics reveal a glaring difference.

Finally, the vehicle insured is an essential factor in calculating the premium. Obviously, the price will differ between a city car and an SUV. The premium is determined by the car's power, the cost of parts for repairs, and by statistics listing the most frequently stolen cars. In 2007, for example, the Smart Fortwo was the most stolen car, followed by the Renault Twingo, the Peugeot 306, the Renault Clio and the Audi A3.

=== Accompanied driving ===
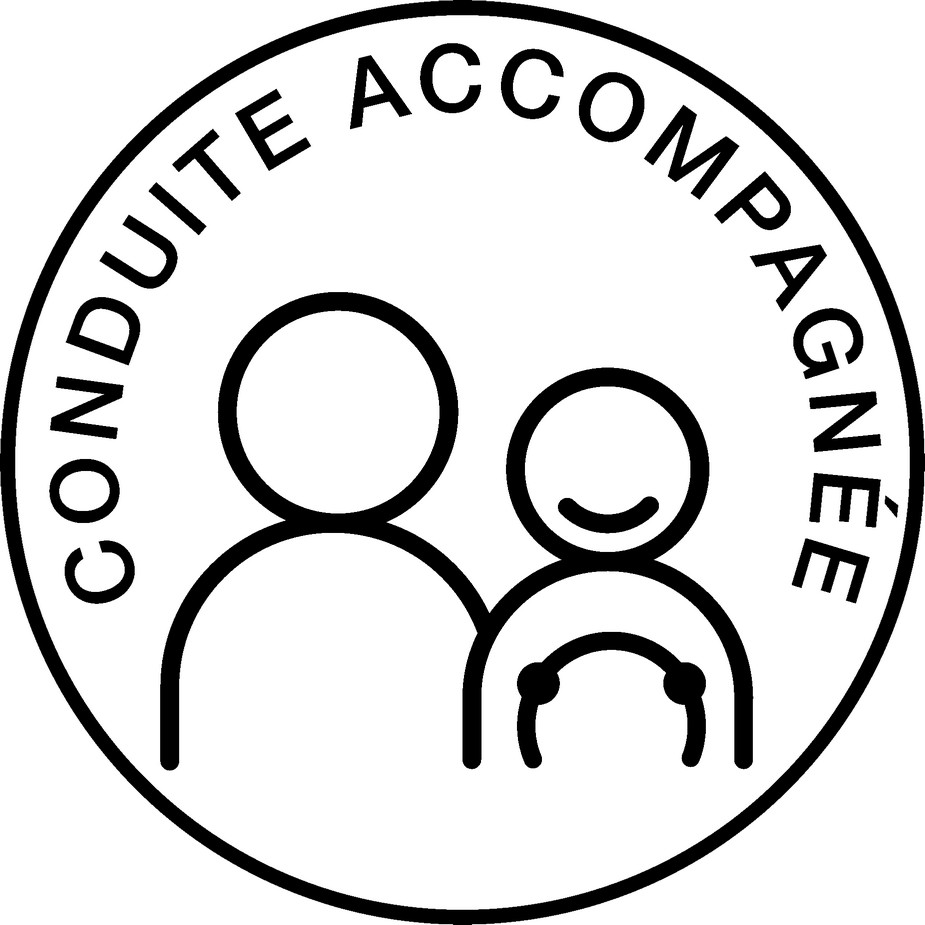
Disc to be affixed to the rear of accompanied driving vehicles.

Parents who wish to drive with their children are not subject to any additional taxes, and the price of their insurance remains the same.

For novice drivers, a surcharge may be applied to the premium, but this cannot exceed 50% for those who have obtained their license through accompanied driving.

=== Taxes ===
Vehicle insurance is not a product subject to VAT, but it is subject to other taxes such as the 18% tax, the 15% contribution provided for by the Social Security Code and the 1.90% contribution to the Fonds de Garantie des Assurances Obligatoires de dommages, and 6% for natural disasters.

There is also a contribution to the Guarantee fund for victims of terrorism and other offences of €3.30 per policy in 2010. This contribution was increased to €4.30 in 2016 and to €5.90 in 2017 following the various attacks that took place in 2015–2016.

=== Bonus-malus ===
The coefficient of reduction-majoration (CRM) is a method of weighting the insurance premium. The lower the bonus, the lower the premium, and vice versa in the case of a malus.

To reward "good drivers", every claim-free year of insurance increases the bonus. However, when an insured is responsible for a claim, he loses part of his bonus, which generally leads to an increase in future premiums. For example, if a policyholder's pure premium is €100 and his bonus is 80%, his premium will be €80, plus fees and taxes. The following year, if he has no crash, his pure premium could be €105 with a 76% bonus, i.e. a premium of €79.80 plus fees and taxes.

== Duration and termination conditions ==
=== Duration ===
The term of a vehicle insurance contract is generally one year, renewable by tacit agreement. However, there may also be temporary contracts known as "notes de couverture": this is a provisional guarantee, generally lasting one month, granted when the subscriber does not have all the documents required to take out the contract. Once the supporting documents have been submitted, the note de couverture is transformed into a definitive contract. If the policyholder fails to present all the required documents, coverage is discontinued.

This can also be a firm temporary contract, e.g. for transit or a loan, or in the case of remote underwriting following a cooling-off period.

=== Termination ===
- Termination at the policyholder's initiative: like most property and casualty insurance policies, the Vehicle insurance contract can be terminated on the anniversary date, subject to the Chatel law or a maximum two-month notice period, but also during the year following the sale of the vehicle, a change in circumstances, or death. To do this, you need to send a letter of cancellation to your insurer, respecting the legal deadlines or the deadlines set out in your insurance policy. In 2015, the Hamon law made it possible to change insurance during the course of the year, once the first year of insurance has elapsed. Policyholders who cancel their contract during the year are entitled to a refund of their insurance premium for the period paid in advance.
- Termination at the insurer's initiative: in certain situations, the insurer may terminate the contract following a major claim within one month of the claim being reported. Cancellation takes place one month after the insured has been informed. Termination may also be triggered by an excess of claims on the anniversary date, or by non-payment of premiums with a minimum ten-day notice period following the end of the formal notice to pay. The insurance company may also terminate the contract for misrepresentation by the insured at the time of underwriting, for failure to meet underwriting criteria or, more rarely, following the liquidation of a company.

== Accidents ==
=== Declaration and compensation ===
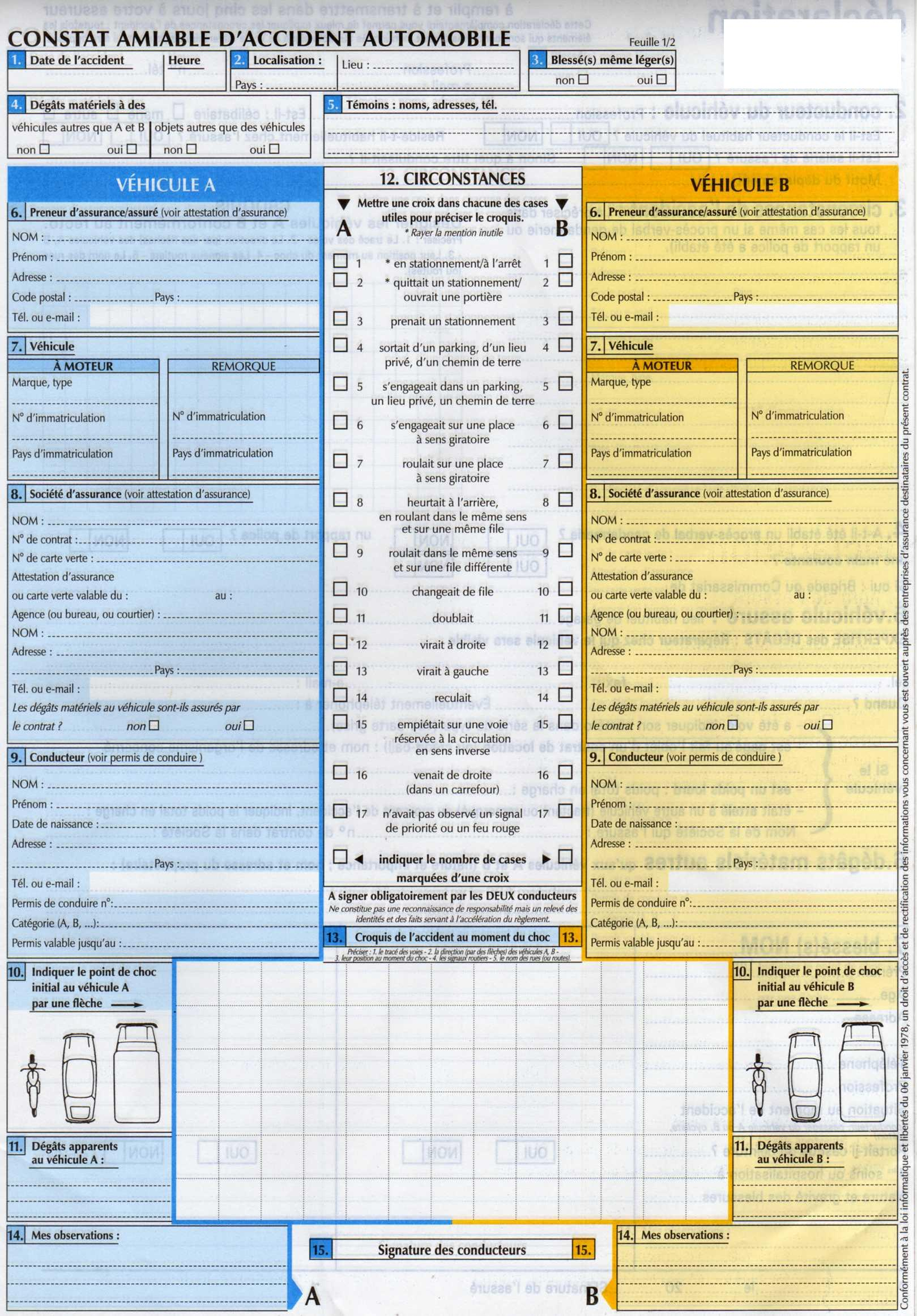
The front of a European crash report form.

==== Declaration ====
The policyholder must make a declaration within two days of the discovery of a theft, and within five days of the occurrence of a crash. If this time limit is not respected, the insurer can claim for the forfeiture of the contract's guarantees, but this provision is only used against the insured in very rare situations. Claims can be made either by means of a joint accident report, or by handwritten letter.

If two people disagree about the circumstances of the crash, only one person outside the vehicles involved can act as a witness, except in the case of a pile-up.

==== Compensation ====
Following a covered crash, an appraisal is carried out by an independent expert who verifies the truthfulness of the declarations and estimates the cost of repairs and of the car, in order to determine whether it is technically and economically viable to repair. If the policyholder disagrees with the amount proposed by the expert, he or she can request a second opinion, at his or her own expense. If the two experts fail to reach agreement, a third expert may be called in to arbitrate. There is no legal stipulation as to how long an appraisal must take.

Vehicle insurance is a contract based on the principle of indemnity: the price reimbursed cannot exceed the price of the car. This is what experts call the "RVAEO" (Replacement value according to expert opinion), which is different from the "cote Argus".

Once it has received the policyholder's approval, the insurance company has three months to compensate the claim.

If a false declaration was made at the time of underwriting, the insured may be subject to nullity of cover, although this will not be enforced against the victims.

Under the terms of article R. 211-13 of the C.A., four categories of exception to coverage cannot be invoked by the insurer against victims or their beneficiaries:

- clauses capping cover or deductibles stipulated in the insurance contract;
- forfeitures, including for causes arising prior to the loss;
- reduction of the insurance indemnity in application of the proportional premium rule for omission or misrepresentation of risk by an insured acting in good faith;
- exclusions from cover under articles R. 211-10 and R. 211-11 of the French Insurance Code.

==== Prescription period ====
In insurance, the limitation period is two years, but this is extended to ten years when a third party is liable.

=== Direct action ===
The insurer of a driver who has caused a crash can be contacted directly by the victim, without going through the victim's insurance company.

=== Liability determination ===
In the event of a crash between one or more vehicles, insurance companies examine the faults that may have been committed by the drivers to determine who is responsible for the loss. This liability determines the deductible that the at-fault driver receives on his or her next anniversary, as well as what the insurance company will pay out and to whom. An insured's liability may be total, partial or zero.

Liability is determined by the accident report, which is generally completed on the spot, by witness statements, or when a report is drawn up by the police in the event of injuries.

The Badinter law makes the driver liable for collisions with pedestrians, except in a few cases, such as attempted suicide.

In the event of theft, the insurance company is obliged to cover any damage caused by the vehicle up to one month after the theft. Damage caused by theft has no impact on the insured's bonus.

In the majority of claims, driver liability is determined by the IDA Convention (Indemnisation Direct de l'Assured). This convention is a liability scale based on the Highway Code and, in conjunction with the joint report, enables us to determine liability in nearly 80% of claims.

==== Impact of the crash on the Bonus ====
Only at-fault or partially at-fault crashes have an impact on the bonus.

Involving the insurance company following theft, fire, glass breakage or assistance does not affect the bonus. Nor do responsible crashes involving game. However, this may have an impact on the following year's rate.

In the event of an at-fault claim, whatever the amount or nature of the damage, the malus is 25%, i.e. if an insured has a 0.54% bonus the following year, the bonus will be 0.67% (0.54*1.25). If the crash is only partially at fault, the malus is only 12.5%, i.e. 0.60%.

==== Examples of traffic violence ====
In the event of a crash in a parking lot, responsibility is not divided equally between drivers: traffic rules apply just as they do on the road.

A driver is considered responsible for his or her doors and awnings if they are in the way of traffic.

A person making a maneuver is most often responsible for a collision with a vehicle in the normal lane, insofar as he or she is the one obstructing traffic.

=== Traffic violence statistics ===
Every year, the number of crashes is falling. In 1979, for example, there were 242,975 bodily injury crashes in France, compared with 124,524 in 1999.

However, the cost of claims is rising faster: the cost of repairs is increasing by 3% a year, the cost of compensation for bodily injury claims is rising by 5-6% a year, and management costs are increasing by 2%.

Nature of traffic violence	Number of crashes	2004 evolution
Material liability	1 600 000	-3%
Personal liability	167 000	-1%
Fire and theft	450 000	-10%
Broken glass	2 950 000	-3%
All-accident damage	1 750 000	-4%

Nature of accident	Cost in %
Vehicle damage	33%
Personal liability	28%
Material liability	22%
Fire and theft	11%
Broken glass	5%
Others	1%

In 2009, insurance companies paid out 9.6 million claims for four-wheeled vehicles alone, representing a total of nearly 16.3 billion euros.

== Consequences of offences and frauds ==
The fight against fraud is an important issue for insurance companies, although it is difficult to put a figure on the losses incurred. Malicious policyholders are prepared to deceive the insurance company in order to earn more money. Whether at the time of purchase, by making a false declaration, or at the time of a claim by declaring false accidents, wilful destruction, misrepresentation of circumstances or the amount of damage. The fight against automobile fraud accounts for around 50% of ALFA's business.

Among the consequences of crime and fraud:

- lack of insurance can be an obstacle to finding an insurer. Indeed, some companies are unwilling to insure a vehicle that has remained uninsured for too long;
- false declaration at the time of underwriting can lead either to nullity of the contract when bad faith is established, or to cancellation within ten days by the company, or at best to regularization of premiums. If the fraudulent misrepresentation is discovered after the claim has been made, a proportional premium rule is applied;
- fraud at the time of a claim leads to forfeiture of cover, often followed by cancellation of the policy;
- if an aggravating circumstance is identified after a claim, an additional penalty may be applied:
  - Crash caused by a driver found to be under the influence of alcohol: 150% surcharge,
  - Crash following suspension of license: 50% to 100% surcharge,
  - Hit-and-run: 100% surcharge,
  - False declaration: 100% surcharge.

In 2019, the insured vehicle file (FVA) was created to combat uninsured driving.

In 2020, uninsured drivers caused 27,332 victims, including 7,984 bodily injury victims, 128 of whom died, at a cost of 106.3 million euros, according to the FGAO.

In 2020, 60% of uninsured motorists were under 35. The departments where uninsured crashes occur are mainly Seine-Saint-Denis, Val-de-Marne and Bouches-du-Rhône.

== Insurance market ==
The vehicle insurance market represents around 10% of the French insurance market. But it's also a closely related economy.

With the liberalization and opening up of the insurance market in 1994, the French vehicle insurance market is legally required to enable consumers to take out insurance policies on the European Union market, and to enable insurance professionals to enter new markets. However, in practice, in 2014, vehicle insurance in France only insures French policyholders, and French policyholders can only insure with vehicle insurance companies in France.

=== Economic market ===
With several tens of millions of vehicles, France has several million claims at a cost of close to 20 billion euros.

==== Traffic violence ====
In 2003, there were around 35 million cars in France, accounting for 7,131,000 claims in 2008, 43% of which involved glass breakage.

In 2014, France had 3.9 million two-wheelers, with 21,335 two-wheeler injuries financed with 912 million euros.

In 2015, France had 40.9 million 4-wheel motor vehicles with a gross vehicle weight rating of 3.5 tonnes or less, excluding the company fleet, involved in 7.6 million insured claims.

==== Turnover ====
The motor insurance market represented total sales of 17,900 million euros in 2008, accounting for 40% of total property insurance premiums.

In 2015, the personal motor insurance market represented sales of 18.5 billion euros.

=== Key market players ===
Out of all the options available to policyholders for taking out a policy, insurance companies with intermediaries remain the most widely used, accounting for almost 45% of contributions, compared with 35% through mutual insurers without intermediaries.

==== Key market players ====
All companies licensed to insure against crashes resulting from the use of motor vehicles can distribute vehicle insurance.

However, the insurance market does not stop with insurance companies. There are also distributors and numerous service providers.

==== Insurance companies ====
In 2005, AXA was the French leader in vehicle insurance in terms of sales, with 2 billion euros and 4.2 million cars insured (excluding fleet and motorcycle).

MACIF is second, with sales of 1.7 billion euros, but leads in number of cars insured, with 4.7 million.

By 2005, six players had sales in excess of one billion euros: AXA, Macif, Groupama-Gan, MAAF, MAIF and AGF.

In 2007, the creation of the Covéa group brings together MAAF, MMA and Azur-GMF. The Covéa group became the market leader, ahead of AXA.

==== Insurance intermediaries ====
To take out an insurance policy, prospective customers can go through a variety of insurance intermediaries, including general insurance agents, brokers, direct employees of the company, its bank or, with the growing use of the Internet, the company itself.

In recent years, distribution channels have broadened. It is now possible to take out policies through insurance prescribers such as car dealerships. It is also possible to take out insurance policies via supermarkets. For some years now, online insurance comparators have also been taking over insurance intermediation. They include Assurland, Le Lynx, LesFurets.com, Hyperassur and LeComparateurAssurance.com. According to the Comité Consultatif du Secteur Financier (Banque de France), in 2011 around 10% of the flow of vehicle insurance subscriptions on the internet were handled by insurance comparators. On July 29, 2013, Google launched its comparison service for automobile contracts on the insurance comparison market.

Startups specializing in online or smartphone-based car brokerage also appeared in 2017, with players such as Leocare, Lovys or Wilov.

==== Other organizations ====
- AGIRA: Association pour la gestion des informations sur le risque en assurance (Association for the management of information on insurance risk), which enables insurers to check an insured person's background when taking out a policy, in order to avoid misrepresentation. It also manages the file of insured vehicles.
- The Automobile Guarantee Fund, which is responsible for compensating victims whose at-fault drivers remain unknown or insolvent.
- The Bureau Central de Tarification (Central Tariff Office), whose sole role is to set the premium in return for which the insurance company concerned is obliged to cover the risk it has been offered.
- ALFA: Agence pour la lutte contre la fraude à l'assurance, created in 1989.

==== Other stakeholders ====
There are many service providers in the vehicle insurance market, including adjusters who determine the cost of repairs following a crash, and medical experts in the event of a personal injury. Car garages carry out repairs, and breakdown services intervene in the event of a crash or breakdown. to the growing use of the Internet, the market is seeing the arrival of insurance premium comparison sites.

== Appendix ==
=== Bibliography ===
- François Chabas, Les accidents de la circulation, Dalloz, 1995, 181 p. (ISBN 978-2-247-02083-6)
- Georges Durry, L'assurance automobile, Paris, Dalloz, 1998, 138 p. (ISBN 978-2-247-03083-5, BnF 36990438)
- Jean-Pierre Daniel, L'assurance automobile aujourd'hui: le modèle français et les marchés Européens, Broché, May 2003
- Francis Noël, Le règlement des sinistres automobile. : Accidents, contentieux et garanties du constructeur, Société Educative Financière Internationale, 2004, 167 p. (ISBN 978-2-89509-061-8)
- Pierre Jadoul, Du neuf en assurance R.C. automobile, Éditions Bruylant, 2005, 272 p. (ISBN 978-2-8027-1908-3)
- James Landel and Lionel Namin, Manuel de l'assurance automobile, Paris, Broché Dalloz-Sirey, May 14, 2008, 428 p. (ISBN 978-2-247-07907-0, BnF 41263408)
- Couilbault, Eliashberg and Latrasse, Les Grands Principes de l'assurance, Paris, L'Argus éditions, 2009, 388 p. (ISBN 978-2-35474-076-4, BnF 42098525)

=== Related articles ===
- fr:Accident de la route en France
- fr:Sécurité routière en France
- Usage-based insurance
- fr:Fédération française de l'assurance
- MAIF (company)
- Early driver training in France

=== External links ===
- Fédération française de l'assurance archive - Official website.
