= International Motor Insurance Card System =

Motor insurance arrangements for international travel

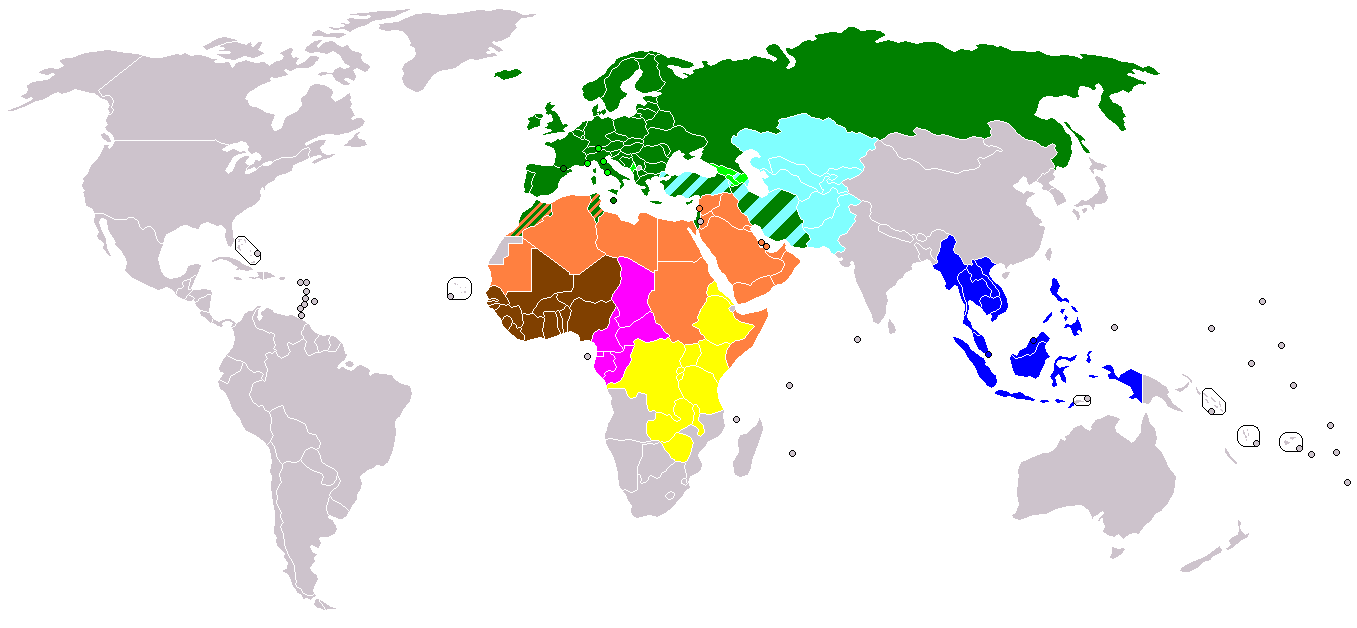
International Motor Insurance Card systems, divided by region: Green card members Green card candidates or participating through foreign bureaux Orange card members White card members (proposed) Blue card members Yellow card members Brown card members Pink card members

An International Motor Insurance Card System is an arrangement between authorities and insurance organizations of multiple states to ensure that victims of road traffic accidents do not suffer from the fact that injuries or damage sustained by them were caused by a visiting motorist rather than a motorist resident in the same country.

In addition to extending the insurance coverage territorial scope, such systems have the benefit for motorists to avoid the need to obtain insurance cover at each of the frontiers of the countries that they visit.

There are multiple motor insurance systems around the world, established on a regional basis. The first was the Green Card system established in 1949 in Europe, but later, other regions followed suit.

== Green card system ==
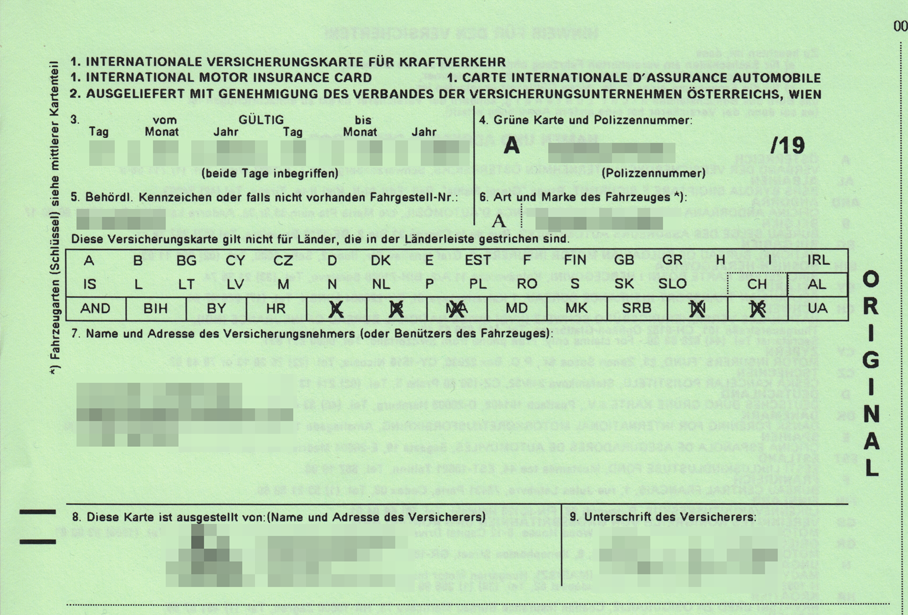
Old Green card in German language, with a single box for the then 29 EEA members, associated with Switzerland (CH), covering nine other nations (un-stricken independent boxes) but not covering five other ones (stricken boxes or ballot box with X)

The Council of Bureaux (COB) maintains an international motor insurance card system in and around Europe where the certificate issued is known by the name green card. In 1949, the system was established in the framework of UNECE. At a later stage, the EU and EFTA were involved, and reflecting the deepening of the links with them, the CoBx secretariat was relocated from London to Brussels in 2006.

Around 300,000 motor accidents a year were covered in Europe by the green card system during the year 2004 according to a survey.

In 2016, the green card system counted around 377,666 international accidents within the green card area.

At the origin, the green card was checked while crossing the border. However, inside the European single market, the green card is no longer checked at internal borders. Insurance for motorized vehicles remains mandatory within the European Union. Some countries (such as France and Belgium) have kept the green card as their national/domestic system of insurance, which make the green card a compulsory requirement in those nations.

A green card is usually issued when the insurance policy starts, but in some cases, the green card is only issued later, upon request. Insurers do not make people pay to have a green card, but intermediaries, including insurance brokers, are allowed in the UK to charge an administration fee.

In each member state of the green card system, the insurance companies established green card bureaux operating with the recognition and approval of the government, and the activities of the Green Card Bureaux are established by law or regulation in each of the countries participating in the system. Each green card bureau has two functions:

1. As a "bureau of the country of the accident", it has responsibility in accordance with national legal provisions for compulsory third-party motor insurance for the handling and settlement of claims arising from accidents caused by visiting motorists.
2. As a "guaranteeing bureau" it guarantees certificates of motor insurance ("green cards"), which are issued by its member insurance companies to their policyholders.

36 of the 47 countries participating in the green card system have replaced the green card with a multilateral agreement, which means the green card is no longer a required document when crossing the borders between those countries. There are three types of green card member states as per the multilateral agreement.

1. EEA members (EU member states, Iceland, Liechtenstein, and Norway)
2. members under section III of the Internal Regulations of the Council of Bureaux (which refers to the multilateral agreement) with the EEA members: Andorra, Bosnia and Herzegovina, Montenegro, Serbia, Switzerland, and the United Kingdom.
3. the rest of the green card members

=== Membership and geographic limits ===
The green card system is primarily a European system. It presently includes most, but not all, European countries, and some of their neighbors, in most cases bordering the Mediterranean Sea. The position of the COB is that the green card system could be joined by the countries "west of the Urals and the Caspian Sea and countries bordering the Mediterranean Sea", but this rule is not followed strictly as Iran and Iraq fall outside of the area as described.

Members
Country	Year	Single "box" (EEA) box
Belgium	(1949)	single box as an EEA member
Switzerland	(1949)	linked to EEA by a multilateral agreement
Czechia (Note: Czechoslovakia joined the Green Card system in 1949. After dissolution in 1993, the Czech Republic and Slovakia remained members.)	(1949)	single box as an EEA member
Denmark	(1949)	single box as an EEA member
France	(1949)	single box as an EEA member
Finland	(1949)	single box as an EEA member
United Kingdom	(1949)	single box as an EEA member until Brexit linked to EEA by a multilateral agreement
Greece	(1949)	single box as an EEA member
Ireland	(1949)	single box as an EEA member
Luxembourg	(1949)	single box as an EEA member
Norway	(1949)	single box as an EEA member
Netherlands	(1949)	single box as an EEA member
Sweden	(1949)	single box as an EEA member
Slovakia	(1949)	single box as an EEA member
Germany	(1951)	single box as an EEA member
Spain	(1953)	single box as an EEA member
Italy	(1953)	single box as an EEA member
Portugal	(1953)	single box as an EEA member
Austria	(1954)	single box as an EEA member
Serbia (Note: The Socialist Federal Republic of Yugoslavia joined in 1954 and its membership was later continued by the State Union of Serbia and Montenegro and finally the Republic of Serbia.)	(1954)	linked to EEA by a multilateral agreement
Poland	(1958)	single box as an EEA member
Hungary	(1960)	single box as an EEA member
Turkey	(1964)	Independent box
Romania	(1965)	single box as an EEA member
Morocco (Note: Mediterranean member of the green card system.) (Note: Member state or prospective member for both Green card and Orange card.)	(1969) (Note: Morocco was an affiliate member between 1969 and 2003 when the affiliate membership status type was abolished.)	Independent box
Tunisia	(1969) (Note: Tunisia was an affiliate member between 1969 and 2003 when affiliate membership status type was abolished.)	Independent box
Iceland	(1970)	single box as an EEA member
Bulgaria	(1971)	single box as an EEA member
Iran (Note: Member of the green card system that is located neither in Europe nor borders the Mediterranean Sea.)	(1976) (Note: Iran was an affiliate member between 1976 and 2003 when affiliate membership status type was abolished.)	Independent box
Malta	(1985)	single box as an EEA member
Albania	(1992)	Independent box
Estonia	(1992)	single box as an EEA member
Croatia	(1992)	single box as an EEA member
Slovenia	(1992)	single box as an EEA member
North Macedonia	(1994)	Independent box
Andorra	(1996)	linked to EEA by a multilateral agreement
Bosnia and Herzegovina	(1996)	linked to EEA by a multilateral agreement
Cyprus	(1996)	single box as an EEA member
Moldova	(1997)	Independent box
Ukraine	(1997)	Independent box
Latvia	(1998)	single box as an EEA member
Belarus	(2003)	Independent box
Lithuania	(2003)	single box as an EEA member
Russia	(2009)	Independent box. Suspended from June 2023.
Montenegro	(2012)	linked to EEA by a multilateral agreement
Azerbaijan	(2016)	Independent box

Additionally, insurance companies or national bureaux of some countries participate in the Green card system through foreign national bureaux:

- Liechtenstein through Switzerland; Liechtenstein is part of the single box as an EEA member
- Monaco through France
- San Marino through Italy
- Vatican City through Italy

Former member states:

- Iraq (1982–1992)
- Israel (Note: Israel was affiliate member between 1968 and 2003 when affiliate membership status type was abolished.) (1968-2022)

According to recommendation of the Management Committee of CoBx it is strongly recommended that the geographical scope of the Green card System should be restricted to the following additional states, in accordance with the European and Mediterranean rule: Algeria, Libya, Egypt, Lebanon, Syria, Georgia and possibly upon further consideration Armenia. Instead of expansion further than that, it is recommended to examine arrangements of cooperation with other motor insurance systems. In 2012 it was decided to add Kazakhstan to the list of potential members since part of it lies west of the Urals.

Countries that are currently candidates for membership are:

- Georgia (2003)
- Armenia (2009)

In 2008, the Economic Cooperation Organization asked the CoBx for cooperation, and since some of its members are outside the geographical scope of the Green card system, it was suggested that the ECO members would establish their regional motor insurance system - the White card system. At the same time, there are discussions whether the scope of the Green card system should be expanded to all UNECE members or to abandon geographical limitations in exchange for criteria based on the density of trade exchanged by road between the candidate country and the existing members of the System.

In 2011 Kosovo submitted application for membership, but it was concluded that the conditions of vehicle license plate international recognition and UN membership are not fulfilled.

The UNECE Afro-Eurasian members states currently outside the Green card system are: Armenia (candidate), Georgia (candidate), Kazakhstan (potential candidate), Kyrgyzstan, Tajikistan, Turkmenistan and Uzbekistan.

Other states, falling within the defined geographical scope of the Green card system (or participating in cooperation activities in the Mediterranean region such as the EMP and/or the UfM), but not participating are:

- Jordan
- Mauritania
- most of the states with limited recognition: Transnistria, Abkhazia, South Ossetia, Northern Cyprus, the State of Palestine, Sahrawi Arab Democratic Republic

All countries in a green card are represented by their international vehicle registration code as follows:

- Single EEA box:
  - A: Austria
  - B: Belgium
  - BG: Bulgaria
  - CY: Cyprus (does not include Northern Cyprus; also covers British territory of Akrotiri and Dhekelia)
  - CZ: Czech Republic
  - D: Germany
  - DK: Denmark (including the Faroe Islands and Greenland)
  - E: Spain (including the Canary Islands as well as Ceuta and Melilla)
  - EST: Estonia
  - F: France (also covers MC - Monaco; includes some oversea territories: La Réunion, Martinique, Guadeloupe, Saint-Martin, French Guiana, Saint Pierre and Miquelon, Mayotte; does not include the following oversea territories: Wallis and Futuna, French Polynesia, New Caledonia, Saint-Barthélemy, French Southern and Antarctic Lands)
  - FIN: Finland (including the Åland Islands)
  - GR: Greece
  - H: Hungary
  - I: Italy (also covers RSM - San Marino and V - Vatican City)
  - IRL: Ireland
  - IS: Iceland
  - L: Luxembourg
  - LT: Lithuania
  - LV: Latvia
  - M: Malta
  - N: Norway (covering in Svalbard and Jan Mayen is not known)
  - NL: Netherlands (does not include Dutch dependencies in the Caribbean)
  - P: Portugal (including the Azores and Madeira)
  - PL: Poland
  - RO: Romania
  - S: Sweden
  - SK: Slovakia
  - SLO: Slovenia
- CH: Switzerland (also covers FL - Liechtenstein)
- AL: Albania
- AND: Andorra
- AZ: Azerbaijan (including the Naxçıvan exclave)
- BIH: Bosnia and Herzegovina
- BY: Belarus (suspended since 30 June 2023)
- HR: Croatia
- IL: Israel (withdrawn since 1 January 2022)
- IR: Iran (suspended since 1 January 2024)
- MA: Morocco (also covers WSA - Western Sahara)
- MD: Moldova (also covers PMR - Transnistria)
- MNE: Montenegro
- NMK: North Macedonia (still appearing as MK, the old code that was discarded in February 2019 following the addition of North in the name of the country)
- RUS: Russia (suspended since the 30th of June 2023)
- SRB: Serbia (does not cover RKS - Kosovo)
- TN: Tunisia
- TR: Turkey
- UA: Ukraine (also covers territories under Russian occupation)
- UK: United Kingdom (including Northern Ireland and the British dependencies in Europe: GBA - Alderney, GBG - Guernsey, GBJ - Jersey, GBM - Isle of Man, GBZ - Gibraltar)

Potential candidates of the green card scope are:

- AM: Armenia
- DZ: Algeria
- EG: Egypt
- GE: Georgia (not including ABH - Abkhazia and RSO - South Ossetia)
- IRQ: Iraq (withdrawn in 1992)
- KZ: Kazakhstan
- LAR: Libya
- RL: Lebanon
- SYR: Syria

=== EU/EEA laws ===
In the single market of the EU and the EEA, international insurance between member states is regulated by specific EU/EEA laws related to insurance against civil liability in respect of the use of motor vehicles, and to the enforcement of the obligation to insure against such liability. Those were amended several times and have been codified:

- 1st EU Directive, amended by Council Directive 72/430/EEC of 19 December 1972 or Council Directive 72/166/EEC of 24 April 1972
- 2nd Council Directive 84/5/EEC of 30 December 1983
- 3rd Council Directive 90/232/EEC of 14 May 1990
- 4th Directive: Directive 2000/26/EC of the European Parliament and of the Council of 16 May 2000
- 5th Directive 2005/14/EC of the European Parliament and of the Council of 11 May 2005 amending Council Directives 72/166/EEC, 84/5/EEC, 88/357/EEC and 90/232/EEC and Directive 2000/26/EC of the European Parliament and of the Council.
- Codified Directive (2009/103/EC)
- 6th Directive: DIRECTIVE (EU) 2021/2118

Article 7 (of 2009/103/EC) deals with national measures concerning vehicles normally based on the territory of third countries:

Each Member State shall take all appropriate measures to ensure that vehicles normally based in the territory of a third country which enter the territory in which the Treaty is in force shall not be used in its territory unless any loss or injury caused by those vehicles is covered, in accordance with the requirements of the laws of the various Member States on compulsory insurance against civil liability in respect of the use of vehicles, throughout the territory in which the Treaty is in force.

In 2021, new rules are considered to introduce an EU-harmonized “Claims History Statement” and to ease prices comparison with free-of-charge and independent price comparison tools. New harmonization set guarantees for personal injuries to € 6 450 000 per accident or € 1 300 000 per injured party or/and for damage to property, € 1 300 000 per accident for vehicles going faster than 14 km/h.

=== UK withdrawal agreement ===
After the UK withdrew from the EU, it ceased to be an EEA member state. From that date, and until the European Commission waived the obligation in Commission Implementing Decision (EU) 2021/1145 of 30 June 2021, in force since 2 August 2021, a physical copy of a green card had to be carried to drive a British-registered vehicle in the EU. Since the obligation was waived, the UK Government page on the subject now states: "You do not need to carry a green card when you drive in the EU (including Ireland), Andorra, Bosnia and Herzegovina, Iceland, Liechtenstein, Norway, Serbia, and Switzerland. You still need valid vehicle insurance. You may need to carry a green card to drive in other countries, including: Albania, Azerbaijan, Belarus, Moldova, Russia, Turkey, Ukraine"

== Orange card system ==
The Orange card system is established between most of the members of the Arab League and is applicable primarily in the Middle East and North Africa.

Participants are: Algeria, Bahrain, Egypt, Iraq, Jordan, Kuwait, Lebanon, Libya, Mauritania, Morocco (Green card member), Oman, Qatar, Saudi Arabia, Somalia, Sudan, Syria, Tunisia (Green card member), United Arab Emirates and Yemen.

The non-participating AL members are: Comoros, Djibouti and Palestine.

== Blue card system ==
The Blue card system is established between the 10 members of ASEAN and is applicable in South East Asia.

== Pink card system ==
The Pink card system is established between the members of the CEMAC and is applicable in Central Africa.

Participants are: Cameroon, Central African Republic, Chad, Congo, Gabon and Equatorial Guinea.

== Brown card system ==
The Brown card system is established between most of the members of the ECOWAS and is applicable in Western Africa.

Participants are: Benin, Burkina Faso, Gambia, Ghana, Guinea, Guinea-Bissau, Ivory Coast, Liberia, Mali, Niger, Nigeria, Senegal, Sierra Leone and Togo.

The non-participating ECOWAS member is Cabo Verde.

== Yellow card system ==
The Yellow card system is established between most of the members of the COMESA and is applicable primarily in Eastern Africa.

Participants are: Burundi, DR Congo, Djibouti, Eritrea, Ethiopia, Kenya, Malawi, Rwanda, Sudan, Tanzania, Uganda, Zambia and Zimbabwe.

The non-participating COMESA members are: Comoros, Egypt (Orange card member), Eswatini, Libya (Orange card member), Madagascar, Mauritius, Seychelles, Somalia (Orange card member), and Tunisia (Green and Orange card member).

== White card system ==
There is a proposal for the establishment of a White card system between the members of the ECO, if the Green Card system territorial scope could not be expanded to include all of them.

Participants are: Afghanistan, Azerbaijan (Green card member), Iran (Green card member), Kazakhstan (Green card potential candidate), Kyrgyzstan (UNECE member), Pakistan, Tajikistan (UNECE member), Turkey (Green card member), Turkmenistan (UNECE member), Uzbekistan (UNECE member).

== See also ==
- Green card (disambiguation) - for other uses of the term, besides a motor insurance certificate
- Vehicle insurance in France
