= Guarantee fund for victims of terrorism and other offences =

French public-law body

FGTI
- Guarantee fund for victims of terrorism and other offences
- Fonds de garantie des victimes des actes de terrorisme et d'autres infractions
- Location: France
- Official language: French
- Website: https://www.fondsdegarantie.fr/fgti/

The Guarantee fund for victims of terrorism and other offences (French: Fonds de garantie des victimes des actes de terrorisme et d'autres infractions - FGTI) is a French public-law body. created by Act no. 90-589 of July 6, 1990, amending the Code of Criminal Procedure and the Insurance Code and relating to victims of crime. At that time, the legislator brought together within a single body two distinct pre-existing missions: compensation for victims of acts of terrorism, and compensation for victims of certain criminal offences.

It grew out of the Terrorism Fund set up in 1986 under pressure from associations, notably SOS Attentats, with a 1990 law extending the Fund's scope. The Fund's financing and scope of intervention are closely linked to the insurance industry, a link that was strengthened by the law of July 1, 2008.

== Organization and financing ==
Articles L. 422-1 to 6 and R. 422-1 to 10 of the Insurance Code deal with the organization and financing of the FGTI.

The FGTI, “endowed with civil personality”, is managed by a nine-member Board of Directors: one representative of the insurance industry, four representatives of various ministries, three members of victims' associations, and a chairman from the Council of State (French: Conseil d'État) or the Court of Cassation. The Fund's bylaws are approved by joint order of the Minister of Justice and the Minister of Insurance, the latter also overseeing the Fund through the appointment of a government commissioner.

The Guarantee Fund was 75% funded by a flat-rate contribution of 4.30 euros (in 2016) levied on each property insurance policy taken out with a company operating in France. Two authors have described this method of financing as “unorthodox”: there is no link between property insurance and compensation for bodily injury to victims of acts of terrorism. The FGTI's resources are supplemented, where applicable, by the reimbursement of compensation obtained by the Fund from the perpetrators of the offenses that led to the damage compensated (20%) and by financial investments (5%). In January 2017, the tax on insurance contracts was raised to 5.90 euros per contract, corresponding to 140 million euros in additional revenue for the FGTI

Management of the FGTI is entrusted to the Guarantee Fund for Compulsory Damage Insurance (French: Fonds de garantie des assurances obligatoires de dommages - FGAO).

== History of competencies development ==
- Law no. 77-510 of January 3, 1977, guaranteeing compensation for certain victims of bodily injury resulting from an offence, was a founding act, laying down the principle that “any person who has suffered injury as a result of an act, whether intentional or not, and having the material character of an offence, may obtain compensation from the State”. However, this text laid down a series of particularly restrictive conditions (serious bodily injury, economic loss, subsidiary intervention, serious material hardship, etc.) and set a ceiling on compensation, which was awarded on an emergency basis by a “Crime Victims Compensation Commission (French: Commission d'Indemnisation des Victimes d'Infractions) - CIVI" sitting in each Court of Appeal.
- The law n°81-82 of February 2, 1981, reinforcing security and protecting personal freedom, extended the compensation system to anyone who, having been the victim of theft, fraud, or breach of trust, could not otherwise obtain compensation and was therefore in a serious material difficulty. It was also the “Security and Freedom” law that introduced a ceiling on resources for claiming compensation, from which the ceiling on the compensation payable is deducted.
- Law no. 83-608 of July 8, 1983, reinforcing the protection of victims of crime, improved the existing system, notably by creating a CIVI at each County Court (French: Tribunal de Grande Instance), including victims' associations in its membership, and allowing its president to grant a provision to the victim.
- Law no. 85-1407 of December 30, 1985, containing various provisions on criminal procedure and criminal law, extended the compensation system to various sexual offences (rape, indecent assault, etc.). For these offenses, the condition that the damage must be serious was abolished.
- Law no. 90-589 of July 6, 1990, amending the Code of Criminal Procedure and the Insurance Code and relating to victims of crime, radically altered the system to its current form. It created the FGTI, instituted the principle of full compensation for serious bodily injury by removing the ceiling, and abolished the restrictive conditions for awarding compensation. It also created a new division of responsibilities between the FGAO and the FGTI, with the latter unable to compensate victims of traffic or hunting accidents.
- Law no. 92-665 of July 16, 1992 introduced two levels of jurisdiction in the compensation procedure, allowing appeals against decisions handed down by the CIVI.
- Law no. 2000-516 of June 15, 2000, reinforcing the protection of the presumption of innocence and the rights of victims, extended the compensation system to include extortion and the destruction, degradation or deterioration of property. Compensation is possible if the victim is “in a serious material or psychological situation”, this last possibility having been inserted by the aforementioned law.
- Law no. 2004-204 of March 9, 2004, known as the “Perben II Law”, adapting the justice system to developments in crime, created an article 706-5-1 in the Code of Criminal Procedure, and introduced a procedure for offering compensation to victims' claims addressed to the Fund by the clerk's office of the CIVI.
- Law no. 2008-644 of July 1, 2008, creating new rights for victims and improving the execution of sentences, enabled compensation to be paid to victims of a fire involving their motorized vehicle, but introduced a ceiling on the compensation payable.
- Finally, at supra-national level, there is the European Convention of November 24, 1983, on the compensation of victims of violent crimes, and the Community directive of April 29, 2004, relating to compensation to crime victims.

== The FGTI's scope of action ==
The FGTI is responsible for compensating both victims of crime and victims of terrorism. Each year, the FGTI handles 17,000 claims for compensation, less than a hundred of which are from victims of terrorism. The majority of the fund is used to compensate victims of ordinary offences (assault, rape, and all offences involving personal injury, burned vehicles, theft, fraud, and extortion).

=== Compensation for certain crime victims ===
==== Full compensation for serious bodily injury and sexual offences ====
===== Conditions concerning the victim =====
Certain conditions relate to the victim's nationality or the territoriality of the crime. Compensation is only available if the victim is a French national (regardless of where the offence took place). If the victim does not have French nationality, they will only be compensated if the events took place on French territory, and if they are a national of the European Union or are legally resident there.

===== Conditions relating to the damage suffered by the victim depending on the nature of the facts =====
Only certain acts listed in article 706-3 of the French Code of Criminal Procedure are eligible for full compensation. Bodily injury caused by asbestos, traffic accidents, or terrorism is legally excluded. These different types of injury are likely to be compensated under other specific schemes. Case law has also excluded work accidents from the FGTI compensation scheme. However, conflicts of jurisdiction between the various guarantee mechanisms are common. In all cases, these facts must “present the material nature of an offence”, and may be “voluntary or involuntary”. At this stage, two observations can be made:

- The presence of the material element alone is sufficient to entitle the claimant to compensation. It makes no difference whether the perpetrator was unknown, under the influence of a mental disorder, or whether the acts were statute-barred, amnestied or not prosecuted.
- The possibility of compensating victims of certain unintentional offences necessarily entails an overlap with other guarantee mechanisms, notably liability insurance, but also the FGAO.

Two types of event may give rise to entitlement to full compensation.

- On the one hand, these are offenses that have “resulted in death, permanent disability [IPP] or total personal work incapacity [ITT] equal to or greater than one month”.
- On the other hand, these are the offences set out in articles 222-22 to 222-30, 225-4-1 to 225-4-5, and 227-25 to 227-27 of the Penal Code, which respectively punish criminal and tortious sexual assault, trafficking in human beings and sexual offences against consenting minors under the age of 15. Case law has also assimilated mere attempt. As an exception, victims of these offences will receive full compensation, regardless of the seriousness of the harm. Geneviève Viney, a specialist in liability law, believes that this is a welcome solution, since “the seriousness of the facts and the probability of psychological trauma are sufficient”. Although this is true, it needs to be qualified for sexual offences under articles 227-25 to 227-27 of the penal code.

Finally, “compensation may be refused or its amount reduced on the grounds of the victim's fault”. Such fault, which may be invoked against the heirs of the direct victim, could, for example, be accepted in cases of recklessness, insults, or participation in a criminal activity. There is a plethora of case law on this subject, (Note: In the first case (Cass. Civ. 2e, December 11, 2003, no. 01-03632), the victim's participation in a punitive expedition against a rival gang reduced his right to compensation by a third. In the second case (Cass. Civ. 2e, July 4, 2002, no. 01-03420), the victim of a gunshot was part of a family in rivalry with another family, and the two families had agreed to meet in a bar to settle their differences. The Court of Cassation refused to award full compensation.) and it fluctuates widely. In all cases, jurisprudence requires the presence of a causal link between the victim's fault and the occurrence of the damage, even if the fault is not necessarily concomitant with the offence.

===== The principle of full compensation for personal injury =====
By “full compensation”, it is meant restoring the victim to their previous situation. This concept is inapplicable in the field of personal injury, and the main aim is to compensate for all types of loss, both economic and non-economic. In this respect, there has been a great deal of discussion on compensation for personal injury over the last few years, and a real consensus has emerged among those involved in the personal injury field around the nomenclature of injury items presented by the group chaired by Jean-Pierre Dintilhac, inspired by case law and the work carried out since 2003 by the Lambert-Faivre commission under the aegis of the National Council for Victims' Assistance (French: Conseil National d'Aide aux Victimes). This nomenclature proposes an inventory and classification of the various injury items characterizing bodily injury compensation, with a precise definition of the compensable content for each.

To assess the amount of compensation paid to the victim, article 706-9 of the French Code of Criminal Procedure requires the Commission to take into account the various sums that the victim is likely to receive from other sources, such as social organizations, their employer or "compensation of any kind received or to be received from other debtors in respect of the same loss". Note that this is not a principle of subsidiarity. Recourse to the CIVI is autonomous and independent of any other recourse the victim may have taken. In practical terms, however, the FGTI will more often than not act as a complementary debtor to ensure full compensation for the victim, and will be called upon to compensate damages that cannot be covered elsewhere. The Code of Criminal Procedure also requires the Fund to deduct from its offer any compensation already paid to the victim by third-party payers.

==== Limited compensation for minor bodily injury and property damage ====
The conditions of territoriality and nationality are the same as for compensation for serious bodily injury.

===== Conditions relating to the nature of the damage =====
Article 706-14 of the French Code of Criminal Procedure distinguishes between two types of partially compensable damage.

- The first is material damage suffered by “any person who is the victim of theft, fraud, breach of trust, extortion or the destruction, degradation or deterioration of property belonging to him or her”. Jurisprudence is limited to the listed offences, refusing compensation to victims of similar acts but falling within the scope of another incrimination: forgery of cheques and use of forged cheques, extortion of funds or abuse of weakness.
- Secondly, there are “victims of personal injury” who cannot “claim full reparation for their loss” under the aforementioned article 706-3, since the events giving rise to the damage resulted in a TIW of less than one month.

===== Conditions relating to the victim's situation =====
There are two conditions relating to the victim's situation.

- The first is a means test. Article 706-14, paragraph 1 of the Code of Criminal Procedure stipulates that the victim's monthly income must be “below the ceiling set by article 4 of law no. 91-647 of July 10, 1991, on legal aid, in order to benefit from partial legal aid”. This ceiling, which is adjusted each year, depends on the number of dependants of the victim. As of January 1, 2008, this ceiling was €1,328, increased by €159 for the first two dependents, and by €101 for each additional dependent. The notion of “resources” is to be understood broadly. It refers to the resources that the victim has had, directly or indirectly, at their disposal, and not just their taxable income.
- Secondly, the offence must have, if only in part, placed the victim “in a serious material or psychological situation”. This purely factual situation must be assessed at the date of the request and covers a wide variety of situations. To give two examples: a child victim of abuse who finds himself in a situation of dependence vis-à-vis the administration will be compensated, while the theft of a Breitling watch does not place the victim in a serious material or psychological situation, as it is not an object of first necessity.

===== Subsidiary intervention by the FGTI =====
In the case of property damage and minor bodily injury, the FGTI's intervention is explicitly subsidiary and reserved for victims who cannot “obtain effective and sufficient reparation or compensation for their loss on any grounds whatsoever”. This “other title” may be the responsible party himself (if known, it will be necessary to prove his insolvency), an insurer, a social organization, or even another guarantee body such as the FGAO.

===== The amount of compensation =====
Article 706-14 stipulates that “compensation is at most equal to three times the monthly amount of this resource ceiling”, i.e. 3984 euros for 2008. The French Supreme Court (Cour de Cassation), in a ruling dated October 10, 2002, refused to adjust the compensation ceiling according to the victim's family expenses, unlike the income ceiling.

==== Compensation for burned vehicles ====
The French law of July 1, 2008 introduced a new case of compensation for victims of a fire in their land motor vehicle, by inserting an article 706-14-1 which partially refers to the previous article, with two unique nuances designed to provide broader compensation.

Firstly, in the specific case of motorized land vehicles, the law removes the requirement that the victim be in a “serious material or psychological situation”.

Secondly, article 706-14-1 raises the income ceiling to 1.5 times the ceiling stipulated in the first paragraph of article 706-14, i.e. 1992 euros for 2008. As for the amount of the allowance, the absence of any reference to consideration of “family responsibilities” suggests that it will not have to be increased in accordance with this criterion, in line with the aforementioned case law.

=== Compensation for victims of terrorism ===
The Guarantee Fund for Victims of Terrorism and Other Offences is also responsible, as its name suggests, for compensating victims of acts of terrorism. The genesis of the current system can be traced back to the wave of terrorist attacks that struck France in 1986, leading to the passing of Act no. 86-1020 of September 9, 1986, on the fight against terrorism. The texts relating to this system are now to be found in articles L. 126-1 to 3 and L. 422-1 and 2 of the French Insurance Code. The system set up by the legislator establishes a dichotomy between compensation for property damage and compensation for bodily injury. The former are compulsorily covered by private insurance, while the latter are fully entrusted to national solidarity.

Article L. 126-2 of the Insurance Code adopts the criminal definition of terrorism set out in Articles 421-1 and 421-2 of the French Penal Code. It refers to “offences connected with an individual or collective enterprise aimed at seriously disturbing public order through intimidation or terror”.

The question of the temporal application of the system has long been the subject of debate. Initially limited to events occurring after its entry into force, it was progressively made retroactive by the legislator to January 1, 1985 and then to January 1, 1982, to avoid any unacceptable discrimination between victims. However, in a ruling handed down on June 23, 1993, the French Supreme Court overruled these considerations and authorized compensation for all victims, regardless of the date of the attack.

Article L. 126-1 of the French Insurance Code stipulates that “victims of acts of terrorism committed on national territory, persons of French nationality who are victims of such acts abroad, and their beneficiaries, whatever their nationality, shall be compensated under the conditions defined in articles L. 422-1 to L. 422-3”. The first of these stipulates that “full compensation for damage resulting from personal injury is provided by the Guarantee Fund for Victims of Terrorism and Other Offences (Fonds de garantie des victimes des actes de terrorisme et d'autres infractions)."

The FGTI is therefore called upon to intervene in cases of bodily injury caused by an act of terrorism. As in the case of criminal offences, compensation is paid to French victims on one hand, and to victims of any nationality injured or killed on French territory on the other. This is a direct system, disconnected from any liability: the FGTI is the main body involved. Nevertheless, paragraph 2 specifies that “compensation may be refused or its amount reduced on the grounds of the victim's fault”. In the case of terrorism, it is assumed that the legislator is referring here to the perpetrator of the attack.

The FGTI's compensation procedure is set out in articles R. 422-6 to 9 of the French Insurance Code. Article R. 422-6 provides for referral to the Fund by the public prosecutor in the event of an act of terrorism. Victims who consider themselves to have been the victims of such an act may also refer the matter directly to the Fund.

Article L. 422-2 stipulates that “the Guarantee Fund is required to make an offer of compensation to any victim within three months of the date on which it receives proof of the victim's injury”. Article R. 422-8 stipulates that this offer must take account of all heads of loss, after deduction of any compensation already received from the social security bodies listed in article 29 of the law of July 5, 1985. Amounts are paid within one month of the decision. Article L. 422-2 also provides for the compulsory payment of one or more provisions to the victim or his beneficiaries, within one month of the claim.

The offer leads to a settlement identical to that provided for under the traffic accident offer procedure. The victim may withdraw from the settlement within fifteen days. If this is the case, or if the settlement is unsuccessful, the procedure becomes a judicial one, with a civil court ruling on the damages due to the victim. Article L. 422-1 para. 3 of the French Insurance Code stipulates that the FGTI “is subrogated to the victim's rights against the person responsible for the damage”.

=== Anxiety and expectation damage ===
One year after the attacks of November 13, 2015, 170 lawyers from Le Bareau de Paris have published a white paper recommending that the “anguish prejudice” for those threatened but not killed, and the waiting prejudice of their loved ones regarding the fate of those threatened, be taken into account. The Allinges rail accident in 2008, in which a train collided with a school bus, and the Puisseguin bus accident in October 2015, saw the recognition of “waiting and worrying” losses by the Thonon criminal court on June 26, 2013, backed up by an out-of-court settlement between the victims' families and the insurers in the second case. Juliette Méadel, French Secretary of State for Victims, agrees in principle with the White Paper's proposals. However, the possible recognition of anguish loss raises the question of the ever-increasing limits of compensation. If the definition of waiting loss, which would compensate for “the wait between the knowledge of the event and the confirmation of relatives at the scene of the attack (... ) or the distressing circumstances in which the vicarious victims were informed of the state of health/death” of the main victim is unquestionably new, this is not the case for the loss of anguish, which is described as ‘additional suffering [resulting from awareness] of imminent death and the anguish associated with it’, as victims of terrorist acts have benefited since 1987 from the recognition of an ‘exceptional loss suffered by victims of terrorism’, which may partly cover the notion of anguish.

== The compensation procedure ==
=== CIVI ===
As early as 1977, and even before the creation of the FGTI, when the State itself was liable to pay compensation, the compensation of victims of certain criminal offenses was handled by a judicial body, the CIVI. This body, the Crime Victim Compensation Commission (French: Commission d'indemnisation des victimes d'infractions) or CIVI, has survived the various reforms of the system and has seen its composition diversify and its prerogatives change. The President of the CIVI has been given greater flexibility in their right to make advance payments to the victim, but it is now the Fund itself that will assess the amount of compensation as part of the settlement procedure. Article 706-4 of the Code of Criminal Procedure establishes a CIVI within the jurisdiction of each tribunal de grande instance. The CIVI is a “civil jurisdiction” at echelon level: it is made up of two magistrates and a “person who has shown an interest in victims' issues”, in other words, in practice, usually a member of a victims' association.

=== Deadlines and supporting documents for referrals ===
The claimant's request must be sent to the CIVI clerk's office “within three years of the date of the offence”. Where criminal proceedings have been instituted, this time limit is extended, and the claim must be filed within one year of the final decision on the public prosecution or civil action brought before the criminal court. In practical terms, the procedure is initiated by a request filed with or sent by registered letter to the secretariat of the competent CIVI, signed by the injured party, his or her legal representative or counsel, it being understood that the assistance of a lawyer is not mandatory.

The competent CIVI is either that of the defendant's place of residence, or that of the criminal court seized of the offence to be compensated. If the offence was committed abroad, the competent CIVI is that attached to the Paris TGI.

This request must be accompanied by “supporting documents” justifying its admissibility, which differ according to the damage suffered. These include the identity of the claimant, his/her relationship to the victim, the date, place and circumstances of the offence, a copy of the judgment, a description of the damage, a cerfa form, the social organizations likely to intervene and the sums already paid by the various organizations likely to intervene, and, of course, the amount of compensation claimed. When the claim is for compensation for minor personal injury or material loss, the claimant must prove that he or she meets the additional conditions, i.e. indicate the amount of his or her resources, the elements establishing the impossibility of obtaining compensation elsewhere, and the description of the serious material or psychological situation resulting from the offence.

=== Transactional or legal proceedings ===
The compensation procedure is normally transactional. In certain cases, it may become judicial. At any stage of the procedure, the Chairman of the CIVI may award one or more advance payments.

- Initially, “the request for compensation, accompanied by supporting documents, is forwarded without delay by the court clerk's office” to the FGTI. The transactional offer procedure is then set in motion: the FGTI “is required, within two months of receipt, to present the victim with an offer of compensation”. If the victim accepts the offer, the statement of agreement is forwarded to the President of the CIVI for approval, giving it enforceability. The decision is notified to the victim and to the FGTI, which pays the sums involved.
- The compensation procedure becomes judicial in the event of a reasoned refusal by the FGTI, or refusal of the offer by the victim, which is assimilated to the victim's failure to respond to the Fund's offer within 2 months. The CIVI then regains all its powers, and one of the two CIVI magistrates will investigate the claim, with a full range of investigative powers, with a view to a non-public hearing. The Public Prosecutor and the Guarantee Fund present their observations no later than fifteen days before this hearing, to which the claimant and the FGTI must be summoned at least two months in advance.

The CIVI calculates compensation according to the classic rules of civil liability. Its decision is then notified to the claimant and the Fund, which must pay the compensation awarded within one month. The claimant and the FGTI may appeal, under the conditions of ordinary law, which entails re-examination of the claim by the Court of Appeal for the TGI in whose jurisdiction the CIVI has its seat.

The Fund then has two options: it can take recourse action against any person liable, or bring an action against the victim who has subsequently received compensation from another source. The victim, for his part, retains all his rights and can bring an action for damages under ordinary law. Article 706-8 of the French Code of Criminal Procedure even allows the victim to return to the CIVI if the decision on civil interests awards him or her more compensation than that paid by the FGTI.
