= Pascal Demurger =

French businessman (born 1964)

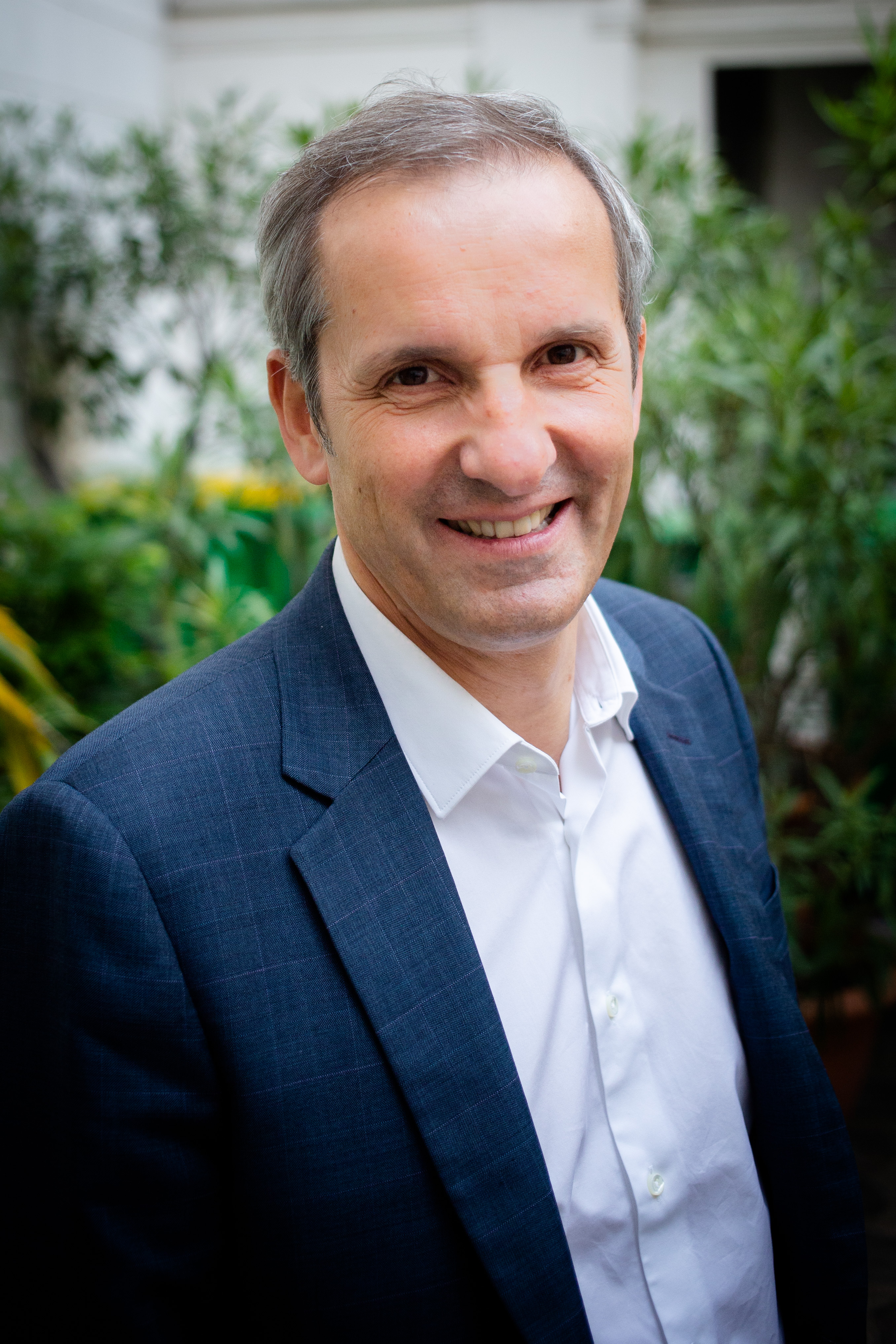
- Demurger in 2019

Director General of MAIF
- Incumbent
- Assumed office 1 October 2009
- Preceded by: Dominique Thiry

Personal details
- Born: 15 October 1964 (age 61) Thizy, France
- Education: École nationale d'administration

Pascal Demurger (born 15 October 1964) is a French businessman serving as director general of MAIF since 2009. In 2024, he was speculated as a candidate for prime minister of France.

== Early life and career ==
Demurger was born in Thizy and grew up in Roanne. From 1994 to 1996, he studied at the École nationale d'administration. He worked at the direction du Budget of the Ministry of Economics and Finance until 2002, when he joined MAIF. He served as deputy director of its subsidiary Filia MAIF, and as administrator of its Spanish subsidiary Atlantis. In 2006, he was appointed deputy director of MAIF. He was appointed executive director in 2008, and succeeded Dominque Thiry as director general in 2009. In 2014, he was elected president of the Groupement des entreprises mutuelles d'assurance. He was made a knight of the Ordre national du Mérite in 2022, and was elected co-president of the Mouvement Impact France in 2023.
