= MAIF (company) =

French insurance company

- Industry: Mutual insurance
- Founded: May 17, 1934; 92 years ago
- Founder: Edmond Proust
- Headquarters: Niort, France
- Key people: Yves Pellicier (chairman); Pascal Demurger (General Manager)
- Services: Insurance; Home insurance; Complementary health insurance; Payment protection insurance; Life insurance; Vehicle insurance; Credit; Group pension; Telesurveillance
- Revenue: 3.70 billion euros (2019)
- Net income: 127.2 million euros (2019)
- Subsidiaries: Altima Assurances; Atlantis Seguros; Atlantis Vida; Filia-Maif; MAIF Vie; Delta Immo; Delta Parc; IMA Group; Socram banque Crédit Immobilier Direct; Maif Solutions Financières
- Website: www.maif.fr

MAIF, in its full form Mutuelle assurance des instituteurs de France, is a French mutual insurance company founded in 1934 and headquartered in Niort, in the Deux-Sèvres region of France. It is governed by the French Insurance Code. It has traditionally offered its services to teachers, since 2000 to employees in the social economy and local authorities, and since 2021 to all employees and companies.

== Background ==
The mutual was founded on May 17, 1934, under the acronym MAAIF for mutual automobile insurance company for teachers in France, in Fontenay-le-Comte, Vendée, by 156 teachers representing 301 members, including 13 female teachers, meeting at the Café des Marronniers. At the beginning of June, Edmond Proust was appointed president of the Young Mutual Society. In 1935, the mutual moved to Niort.

In 1938, bodily injury was covered. In 1942, 10,000 members (out of 35,000) continued to pay their car insurance premiums, despite the total loss, thus saving the mutual. In the same year, bicycle insurance was created to compensate for the consequences of the war, during which cars were immobilized or requisitioned. At the same time, Edmond Proust joined the Resistance, first as a prisoner of war and then after his release. After his release in August 1941, he regained his position as president.

In 1947, a purchasing group was created: the Coopérative des adhérents de la MAAIF (Camif), offering a list of products at advantageous prices. In 1950, MAAIF took off, and membership grew rapidly.

MAAIF helped craftsmen and tradesmen by providing financial support for the creation of Macif (1960) and Matmut (1961), and by sharing its experience and staff with MAAF (1950). Together with GMF, these four mutual insurers created a joint trade association in 1964: Groupement des sociétés d'assurance à caractère mutuel, which became Groupement des entreprises mutuelles d'assurance (GEMA) in 1989.

In 1952, auto cover was grouped into a single contract (previously there were four: Motor Third Party Liability, Vehicle Theft and Fire, Defense and Recourse, Bodily Injury Compensation). Three years later, a multi-coverage home policy called RAQVAM (Risques Autres Que Véhicules à Moteur) was offered. Previously, several contracts covered home, third-party liability...

In 1965, MAAIF began to organize its activities around associations and local authorities. The following year, MAAIF created a tourist assistance service, MAAIF Assistance. It is included in car and household insurance policies at no extra cost. Outside France, MAAIF Assistance relies on the network of member-policyholders teaching abroad. In 1981, it was professionalized and brought together under the name of Inter Mutuelles Assistance, in partnership with the other two Niort-based mutuals (MAAF and Macif).

In 1969, MAAIF became MAIF. The disappearance of the "A" (the word "automobile") confirmed the widening of the mutual's field of activity. From then on, the two policies Vam ("Véhicule à moteur") and Raqvam ("Risque autres que véhicules à moteur") accompanied the rise of the consumer society. The mutual opened up to new members, in particular youth and cultural centers and other popular education organizations. In 1980, the MAIF Prevention Association was created to educate schools about road and home risks.

In 1984, MAIF created Pacs ("Protection du conducteur assuré et des siens"), a contract to protect both driver and passenger. The following year, the life insurance company Parnasse-VIE (now MAIF Vie) was created.

By 1995, MAIF had 1.5 million members and sales of 6.7 billion francs.

In 2000, MAIF began advertising on television under the slogan "MAIF Assureur militant", which was unveiled at the June general meeting in Paris. In 2009, MAIF took part in the creation of SGAM Sferen with Macif and Matmut, in order to pool their resources. Finally, other social economy structures (mutuals, cooperatives) and local authorities can also become members of the Mutuelle from this date. In 2011, the MAIF Associations & Collectivités brand was created. It brings together the network and the offer aimed at this public11.

In 2014, after announcing its intention to leave SFEREN in April, Maif's Extraordinary General Meeting officially voted on the withdrawal process on May 29, 2014; this vote is subject to the approval of the Autorité de contrôle prudentiel et de résolution, which has three months to give its opinion.

In September 2015, MAIF acquired a stake in NUMA, becoming one of its main shareholders.

Logo between 1994 and 2019.

In 2017, the insurer's sales totaled 3.5 billion euros. In 2020, it will have 2.8 million automobile policyholders.

On July 11, 2020, an Extraordinary General Meeting validated the Board of Directors' proposal to turn MAIF into a company with a mission, as permitted by the 2019 Loi Pacte. On this occasion, the mutual removes socio-professional criteria from its conditions of access: it opens up to employees in all sectors, as well as to small and medium-sized business-to-business companies and merges, on January 1, 2021, with its subsidiary Filia-MAIF and its 900,000 member-policyholders.

In 2020, hit by the consequences of the COVID-19 pandemic, MAIF quadrupled its net profit compared with 2019 (36 million euros versus 127 million euros).

Approaching the statutory age limit, Dominique Mahé steps down as chairman in 2022 with the election of his successor Yves Pellicier.

== Principle ==
The founders' main principles are:

- independence from major financial companies
- groups, direct distribution of contracts without commissioned intermediaries,
- solidarity between members,
- member responsibility,
- and values such as republicanism and secularism, as expressed in the mutual's charter and actions. (Note: In 2005 and again in November–December 2006, MAIF organized a series of conferences on secularism (in 2005 on the Law of 1905, in 2006 on secular schools). See Pierre Baracca, "Défense de laïcité par la MAIF avec Henri Peña-Ruiz", ReSPUBLICA, no. 492, December 5, 2006.)

The company operates on the principle of collective profit, where individual profits are eliminated, and profits are redistributed through member dividends. The organization does not compensate any shareholders. Instead, it belongs to all member-policyholders. Any surpluses generated are distributed among member-policyholders in the form of rebates or allocated to strengthen the mutual's financial base, as decided by the General Meeting. MAIF was initially reserved for schoolteachers only, but later opened its doors to other members of the French education system, as well as those in research, culture, associations, and local authorities.

== Organization and governance ==
As a mutual, MAIF has neither share capital nor shareholders. Its customers, known as member-policyholders, acquire a say in the company's policies and strategies by joining the mutual. Every 3 years, they take part in the election of member-policyholder delegates at the General Meeting, on the principle of "1 member = 1 vote". This system of member representation brings together some 760 elected representatives, divided into 3 divisions and 30 territorial groupings. They represent member-policyholders at General Meetings, vote on MAIF's activities and financial statements, elect the directors, and attend regional group meetings twice a year.

The "mandataires du Conseil d'Administration" (MCA), who are appointed by the Board of Directors, form a permanent link between the mutual, its members and its socio-economic environment. They are also responsible for coordinating mutualist life and the preventive actions implemented by MAIF.

Mutualist representatives are those who combine the titles of elected delegates of member-policyholders and representatives on the board of directors. There are around 600 of them, making up the militant team. They are mainly teachers (active or not), chosen from the historical core of MAIF's membership, and are the bearers of the decisions and orientations taken by the board of directors.

MAIF's board of directors is made up of 24 members (21 members elected by the General Meeting and 3 members elected by the employees), and delegates to the Board's representatives the power to represent it locally in dealings with members. The board of directors is governed by internal regulations which define the rights and obligations of the directors of MAIF. These rules are supplemented by the Code of Ethics for Directors of Mutual Insurers of the Groupement des Entreprises Mutuelles d'Assurance (GEMA), the professional association to which the MAIF belongs.

Risk management is declared "moderate" or "standard risk" in the 2021 Solvency and Financial Condition Report, and uses reinsurance for peak risks: "Peak risks claims of very high intensity but with a low probability of occurrence, are ceded to reinsurance."

MAIF has been a mission-driven company since 2020.

== MAIF Prevention ==
Created in 1980, Prévention MAIF is an association under the law of 1901. Its mission is to develop road safety, everyday risks, and major risks education initiatives, particularly in schools, for the benefit of children and teenagers, as well as senior citizens, associations, local and regional authorities...

Two thousand volunteers work in 98 departmental offices at 117 sites to carry out educational projects and create educational documentation in the form of brochures, films and software for teachers.

Prévention MAIF is recognized by the French Ministry of Education:

- as an educational association that complements public education,
- as a national youth and popular education association.

== MAIF Avenir investment funds ==
In September 2014, MAIF invested in Koolicar, a car-sharing service. This first initiative kicked off a more global project: the creation in 2015 of a fund dedicated to innovation, digital and the collaborative economy, SAS MAIF Avenir. Two of the structure's objectives are to create new services for member-policyholders and to access new communities. The fund also invests in start-ups such as:

- GuestToGuest, a home and apartment exchange platform for private individuals, in April 2015;
- Numa, a global network that supports start-ups, companies, and communities in their development;
- MesDépanneurs.fr, home breakdown service and Cbien, online inventory service: in September 2015;
- Mutum, a platform for lending and borrowing objects between private individuals, in September 2015;
- Payname, in October 2015, was renamed Morning in June 2016, a payment platform between private individuals. On December 1, 2016, the Autorité de contrôle prudentiel et de résolution suspended Morning's authorization. On May 28, 2021, the company is dissolved without liquidation, its assets being incorporated by its sole partner, Banque Edel;
- Stootie, a people-to-people services platform, in September 2016;
- Yescapa, a marketplace for nomadic travel in Europe, in September 2016;
- CertiDeal, a platform specializing in refurbished electronic products, in April 2020;

Finally, MAIF reinvested in Koolicar and TravelCar in April 2016 with PSA Peugeot Citroën.

== Associations & Public authorities ==
MAIF Associations & Collectivités is a brand of the MAIF Group specializing in the markets for associations, public establishments in education, culture, research, municipalities, and EPCIs.

In 2014, it had 155,000 members, sales of 179.7 million euros, 97,821 insured vehicles, and 155,064 Raqvam daily risk contracts.

Its network comprises several specialized entities, including 14 Regional Centres in mainland France.

== Affiliates ==
MAIF has several subsidiaries, including:

- Filia MAIF (reintegrated): MAIF subsidiary for people whose profession does not allow them to join the mutual directly, or for the children of member-policyholders who are no longer dependent on their parents. They can benefit from the same policies as MAIF, at rates 15% to 20% higher. MAIF is one of the world's leading insurers, with over 800,000 members and sales of up to 530 million euros. Since January 1, 2021, this subsidiary has been absorbed by the MAIF mutual insurance company.
- MAIF VIE (formerly Parnasse-MAIF): a subsidiary specializing in life insurance. It has 489,156 members with €755.9 million in premium income and €9.9 billion in assets under management (2017).
- Atlantis Seguros: this is a subsidiary of MAIF in Spain, distributing life insurance, non-life insurance, car insurance, home insurance and provident insurance, with a French-language service. The Spanish subsidiary was sold to Assurances du Crédit Mutuel in May 2015.
- MAIF Solutions Financières: the MAIF group's distribution subsidiary, organized into two divisions: the asset management division, which complements the MAIF network to provide members with a range of services tailored to their needs (life insurance, diversified investments, and FIP solidaire); and the commercial relations services division, a remote relations business specializing in outgoing contacts.
- MAIF Connect, a specialist banking brokerage subsidiary operating under the Crédit Immobilier Direct brand (loan insurance, mortgages, credit repurchase). Bought out in 2009 by the MAIF Group, this intermediary in banking and payment services and insurance broker is based in Niort (Deux-Sèvres), like its parent company48.
- ALTIMA Assurances: MAIF spun off this Niort-based brokerage company in December 2014.
- SMACL Assurances SA (70%): a subsidiary specializing in insurance for local authorities, to be set up on January 1, 2022.

== Partnerships ==
The following is a list of the main partners:

- SOCRAM Banque: A consumer credit organization and retail bank that manages financing for vehicle purchases and repairs home improvements. SOCRAM Banque is a joint subsidiary of the 10 mutual insurers in the GEMA group (Groupement des Entreprises Mutuelles d'Assurance), including MAIF, which distributes its products through the networks of its mutual partners.
- Mutuelle générale de l'Éducation nationale (MGEN): to expand in the health sector, MAIF has set up a partnership with MGEN, which manages the social security of national education staff by delegation of public service, and offers complementary health insurance; it distributes MGEN Filia health cover.
- Inter Mutuelles Assistance (IMA): IMA SA was founded in 1980 on the foundations of MAIF Assistance, which in 1966 was one of France's first repatriation assistance companies. IMA SA holds over 80% of the voting rights in IMA GIE, an essential partner in the MAIF offer, since it provides most assistance services for members traveling (travel, tourism), anywhere in the world. An IMA subsidiary also implements MAIF's remote protection services.
- Mutuelle des Œuvres Corporatives de l'Éducation Nationale (MOCEN): MOCEN is a complementary health insurance company. Since 2013, MOCEN has joined MGEN Filia. MGEN Filia welcomes all members of the MOCEN Santé range.
- Groupe VYV: in 2018, VYV and MAIF joined forces to offer a life insurance product with MAIF Vie. It has been distributed by VYV since the end of 2019.

== Professional associations ==
MAIF is a member of the following industry organizations:

- Association des assureurs mutuels et coopératifs en Europe: created in January 2008 by the merger of the two associations representing mutual and cooperative insurance in Europe, AISAM and ACME.
- Groupement des entreprises mutuelles d'assurance: the trade association for mutual insurers without intermediaries and their subsidiaries.
- It is a member of Euresa, a European economic interest grouping of 14 European insurers.

== Interest representation activities ==
=== At the French National Assembly ===
MAIF is registered as an interest representative with the French National Assembly. The company, with sales of 3,167,000,000 euros in 2013, states that the annual costs of its direct interest representation activities with Parliament are between 50,000 and 100,000 euros.

=== European Union institutions ===
MAIF has been listed in the European Commission's transparency register for interest representatives since 2011. In 2015, it declared expenses of between €50,000 and €100,000 for this activity.

MAIF is a member of Amice and GEMA, which are also registered as interest representatives with the European Commission.

== Controversies ==
=== General Manager's remuneration ===
In 2023, Maif CEO Pascal Demurger's remuneration of 55,000 euros gross per month contradicts the major orientations of the Mouvement Impact France (MIF) and the Social Solidarity Economy, and does not meet the "Entreprise solidaire d'utilité sociale" (Esus) approval criteria limiting the difference to 10 times the SMIC. This salary is equivalent to 30 times the SMIC, and more than 20 times the Maif minimum wage.

=== Unfair dismissal ===
According to Le Parisien, in October 2023, MAIF was ordered by the Compiègne industrial tribunal to pay €40,000 in compensation to a former employee for dismissal "without real and serious cause". The employee in question was, without her knowledge, being monitored by software developed in-house, despite the recommendations of the French Data Protection Authority (Commission nationale de l'informatique et des libertés).

== See also ==
- Usage-based insurance
- Vehicle insurance in France

== Bibliography ==
- Martin, Pierre (2010). Le risque automobile en France 1910-2010. Les cahiers de l'Assurance. Archived from the original on 2012-07-24.
- Brucy, Guy (2000). "CHAUMET (Michel). MAIF. L'histoire d'un défi". Histoire de l'éducation. 85 (85). doi:10.4000/histoire-education.416. Archived from the original on 2013-08-19.
- Chaumet, Michel (1998). MAIF: L'histoire d'un défi. Paris: Le Cherche midi. ISBN 978-2862745770.
- Canfin, Pascal (2004). "La MAIF tente le pari du manager militant". Le Monde. ISSN 1630-5027.
- "La Maif lance sa première campagne grand public". Stratégies. Archived from the original on 2015-09-24.
- Bréhier, Thierry (1980). "Mutualiste et capitaliste". Le Monde. Archived from the original on 2023-10-15.
