= Geneviève Viney =

French law professor and jurist (1937–2023)

- Born: 6 July 1937
- Died: 2 October 2023 (aged 86)
- Education: Faculty of Law of Paris
- Occupations: Law professor Jurist

Geneviève Viney (6 July 1937 – 2 October 2023) was a French law professor and jurist who specialised in law of obligations.

== Biography ==
Born on 6 July 1937, Viney earned her baccalauréat at the age of 16 and began studying law in Paris. She graduated in 1960 and began working for the Court of Cassation the following year. In 1963, she published her thesis, titled Le déclin de la responsabilité individuelle, under the direction of René Rodière at the Faculty of Law of Paris. For this work, she was awarded the Prix Georges Ripert and was published in the LGDJ. From 1964 to 1967, she was a lecturer at the University of Dijon.

After having taught at the University of Caen Normandy from 1968 to 1972 and at Paris-East Créteil University from 1972 to 1973, Viney was a professor of law of obligations at Paris 1 Panthéon-Sorbonne University from 1974 to 2006. From 1998 to 2004, she directed the Centre de recherche en droit privé. In 2000, she wrote Le principe de précaution alongside Philippe Kourilsky, intended for the Prime Minister and published in the Documentation française. She retired from teaching in 2006 and became a professor emeritus. On 16 March 2013, she spoke out against the legal adoption of same-sex marriage in France by signing a petition of 170 law professors across the country.

Geneviève Viney died on 2 October 2023, at the age of 86.

=== Participation in commissions and seminars ===
Geneviève Viney participated in the work of the Commission des clauses abusives (Unfair Terms Commission) for four years.

She also took part in the work of several commissions established by the Ministry of Justice, notably the commission chaired by Jacques Ghestin responsible for drafting a text to transpose European Directive No. 95/374 of 25 July 1985 on liability for defective products (1986; the directive was eventually transposed by Law No. 98-388 of 19 May 1998).

She served as the chair of the commission tasked with drafting a text to transpose European Directive 99/44 of 15 May 1999 on the sale of consumer goods and associated guarantees (2001–2002; the directive was transposed by Ordinance No. 2005-136 of 17 February 2005, and ratified by Law No. 2006-406 of 5 April 2006).

She was a member of the Catala Commission—which she co-founded with Pierre Catala and Gérard Cornu—tasked with proposing a reform of the French law of obligations and prescription (2005). She led the sub-group responsible for drafting the reform of civil liability law.

Following this, she continued to advocate for this reform, which she considered essential, particularly after the laws governing prescription (2008) and then the general law of contracts and the regime of obligations (2016–2018) were updated.

Geneviève Viney has authored numerous reports for national and international symposiums since the 1970s, notably participating in the sessions of the Association Henri Capitant, where she presented a national report (1976) and a synthesis report (1999); the International Academy of Comparative Law (with a national report and synthesis report at the Caracas Congress in 1982); and the Journées René Savatier (synthesis report in 1997).

In 2004, she contributed to the Livre du bicentenaire (Bicentenary Book) of the Civil Code, focusing on the challenges of recodifying civil liability law.

== Works ==
=== Personal works ===
- Le déclin de la responsabilité individuelle, 1965.
- Introduction à la responsabilité, LGDJ, 1982 ; 4th edition, 2019.
- Les conditions de la responsabilité, LGDJ, 1982 ; 4th edition 2013, w. Patrice Jourdain & Suzanne Carval.
- Les effets de la responsabilité, LGDJ, 1988 ; 4th edition 2017, w. Patrice Jourdain & Suzanne Carval.
- Les régimes spéciaux et l’assurance de responsabilité, LGDJ 1988 ; 4th edition 2017, w. Patrice Jourdain & Suzanne Carval.
- L'indemnisation des victimes d'accidents de la circulation, LGDJ, 1992.

=== Collaborative works ===
- La réparation du dommage corporel. Essai de comparaison des droits anglais et français (1985), w. B. Markesinis.
- Le principe de précaution (2000), w. Ph. Kourilsky.
- Les sanctions de l'inexécution des obligations contractuelles (2001)
- La responsabilité environnementale dans l'espace européen (2006)

=== Articles ===
- Responsabilité du fait des produits et atteintes à l'environnement (1981)
- Le préjudice écologique, in Le préjudice : questions choisies (1998)
- De l'utilité ou de l'inutilité de la responsabilité contractuelle (1999)
- In memoriam - André Tunc (1917-1999) (1999)
- Existe-t-il une responsabilité contractuelle du fait d'autrui ? (2000)
- Brèves remarques à propos d'un arrêt qui affecte l'image de la justice dans l'opinion (2001)

== Honors ==
- Knight of the Legion of Honour (1999)
