= Guarantee Fund for Compulsory Damage Insurance =

Organization responsible for compensating victims of traffic accidents in France

FGAO
- Guarantee Fund for Compulsory Damage Insurance
- Fonds de garantie des assurances obligatoires de dommages
- Formation: December 31, 1951; 74 years ago
- Location: France
- Official language: French
- Board of directors: Julien Rencki
- Website: www.fondsdegarantie.fr

The Guarantee Fund for Compulsory Damage Insurance (French: Fonds de Garantie des Assurances Obligatoires de dommages - FGAO), formerly known as the Guarantee Fund for Automobile Insurance (French: Fonds de Garantie Automobile - FGA), is a French organization responsible for compensating victims of traffic accidents in cases where the responsible party is uninsured, unidentified, or when the insurer is insolvent.

The fund was established in 1951 in response to the increasing number of motor vehicles on the road and the corresponding rise in accidents. Over time, the FGAO’s mandate has broadened to include additional responsibilities related to victim compensation. These include compensation for damages resulting from mining risks and from the insolvency of property damage insurers, particularly those operating in France under the European Union’s freedom to provide services framework.

== History ==
The Guarantee Fund for Automobile was established before the introduction of compulsory motor insurance in France. As early as 1951, the French legislature created a mechanism to provide compensation for victims of personal injury accidents caused by motor vehicles when the responsible driver was unknown, uninsured, or financially insolvent. (Note: Art. 15 of Act no. 51-1508 of December 31, 1951 on special Treasury accounts for 1952.)

However, the system proved financially unsustainable, and by 1957, the Fund had accumulated a deficit of 6 million francs. This led to the implementation of compulsory third-party liability insurance, introduced by the law of February 27, 1958.

Notably, even in 1951, lawmakers had anticipated the potential introduction of mandatory insurance, stating that the Guarantee Fund was created “without prejudice to any provisions that may subsequently be made within the framework of a compulsory insurance system”.

Over time, the Fund’s scope of intervention was gradually expanded through a series of legislative reforms:

- Law of July 11, 1966 extended the Fund’s jurisdiction to include compensation for bodily injuries resulting from hunting accidents.
- Law No. 66-882 of November 30, 1966 (on insurance contracts) introduced two key changes:
  - It extended coverage to certain material damages caused by road traffic accidents.
  - It allowed the Fund to intervene if the insurer of the responsible party had their authorization withdrawn
- Law No. 72-1130 of December 21, 1972 expanded the obligation to insure certain land-based motor vehicles and extended the Fund’s remit to cover accidents occurring within European Community countries.
- Law No. 77-574 of June 7, 1977 significantly broadened the Fund’s mandate. Article 40 enabled it to compensate for personal injury accidents resulting from “traffic on the ground” in public spaces, regardless of whether a motor vehicle was involved. This allowed coverage for incidents involving pedestrians, cyclists, rollerbladers, skiers, and scooter users.
- The Badinter Law of July 5, 1985 aligned the Fund’s obligations with those of insurance companies, particularly regarding offer procedures and compensation deadlines in motor vehicle cases.
- On May 28, 1990, two rulings by a mixed chamber of the Court extended the Fund’s jurisdiction further. (Note: Cass. ch. mixte, May 28 1990; Resp. civ. et assur. 1990, comm. 226 and chron. 11, H. Groutel. This is an earlier solution, but there was some doctrinal controversy as to the hierarchy of norms at the time. The former article L. 420-1 only covered persons liable for traffic accidents, while the implementing regulatory text, which was necessarily inferior, also referred to accidents caused by animals and things other than a motorized vehicle.) It could now compensate victims of accidents in public spaces caused entirely or partly by an animal or object belonging to a third party or under their custody, provided the third party bore liability.
- Finally, the law of August 1, 2003 further expanded the Fund’s jurisdiction—by then renamed the Guarantee Fund for Compulsory Damage Insurance (FGAO)—to include:
  - Failures of compulsory insurance companies;
  - Damage caused by unowned or unidentified animals;
  - Property damage resulting from traffic accidents not involving land motor vehicles;
  - Management and financing of increases in annuities awarded for damage caused by land motor vehicles.

== Organization and financing ==
Today, the Guarantee Fund for Compulsory Damage Insurance (FGAO) operates as a legal entity under private law. It brings together all insurance companies authorized to operate in France and subject to government supervision. These companies cover risks subject to compulsory insurance, including motor vehicle and hunting-related risks. Membership in the fund is mandatory and ends only in the event of withdrawal, cessation of activity, or loss of regulatory approval. The organization, operation, and oversight of the fund are governed by Articles R. 421-25 and following of the French Insurance Code.

Although all eligible insurance companies are automatically members of the fund, they are not permitted to use this status for advertising purposes.

Article L. 421-4 of the French Insurance Code outlines three main sources of financing for the FGAO. A fourth source is defined in another provision of the same code, with various regulatory texts providing additional clarification.

1. Contributions from insurance companies: the fund receives three types of contributions from insurers. These are calculated based on:
  1. Premiums for compulsory insurance policies;
  2. Premiums for policies covering motor risks;
  3. Contributions from insurers offering hunting insurance;
2. Contributions from policyholders:
  1. A 1.2% charge on all motor third-party liability insurance premiums or contributions, applicable since August 1, 2010; (Note: Insurance code, art. A. 421-3. Previously, this contribution was 0.6%.)
  2. A flat-rate contribution of 0.02 euros from each hunter holding an insurance policy;
3. Contributions from uninsured liable parties:
  1. Uninsured individuals responsible for traffic or hunting accidents are required to contribute 10% of the compensation amount they owe. Although this contribution is rarely collected in practice, it serves an important symbolic and moral function, reinforcing personal accountability;
4. Penalties for inadequate compensation offers:
  1. Under the motor claims compensation procedure, if an insurer makes an offer that is insufficient, it may be required to pay the fund up to 15% of the total compensation awarded to the victim.

=== The FGAO at the center of the policyholder protection system ===
The legislator could have assigned the mission of policyholder protection to a dedicated fund or to the Guarantee Fund for Policyholders Against the Default of Life and Health Insurance Companies (French: Fonds de garantie des assurés contre la défaillance de sociétés d'assurance de personnes – FGAV), whose remit had already been expanded. However, the legislator ultimately placed the FGAO at the core of the system intended to protect policyholders in the event of insurer insolvency. This decision may appear unexpected, given that the nature of the risk—insurer default—is common to both sectors. As a consequence, two subsidiaries of the same financial group, one operating in life insurance and the other in property and casualty insurance, would be covered by different guarantee mechanisms in the event of failure.

=== The mechanism introduced by the legislator ===
The mechanism introduced by the legislator is designed to protect policyholders and beneficiaries of insurance contracts that are made compulsory by law or regulation. It applies in cases where the insurer, licensed in France and subject to government supervision, is no longer able to meet its obligations. Coverage is excluded for contracts involving certain types of property, including maritime, river, air, space, and rail vehicles, as well as for contracts taken out by certain individuals or entities. These exclusions include company insiders, other insurers, credit institutions, and those purchasing insurance for professional purposes.

When the French insurance supervisory authority, the Autorité de contrôle des assurances et des mutuelles (ACAM), determines that an insurance company is no longer able to meet its obligations, it notifies the FGAO. The fund then has a period of fifteen days to submit its observations. Based on this exchange, ACAM decides whether to refer the case to the FGAO and notifies the insurer accordingly. If the referral is confirmed, ACAM immediately issues a call for tenders to transfer the insurance portfolio. This process entails the withdrawal of all administrative approvals previously granted to the company in question.

The fund may be called upon to intervene under two circumstances: if the portfolio transfer fails entirely, or if the transfer is only partial. For policies not transferred, the FGAO is responsible for handling all claims arising from events that occurred between the date of the approval withdrawal and the fortieth day thereafter. Claims may only be submitted after a five-year period has elapsed following the withdrawal of approval. In such cases, the FGAO ensures the rights of policyholders, contract holders, and beneficiaries by making the required payments, within the limits defined by the specific policy conditions and subject to a cap of 90 percent of the compensation that would have been payable by the defaulting insurer.

Finally, the fund is subrogated to the rights of the parties it compensates. It may seek recovery from the directors of the failed insurance company or from the individual or entity responsible for the damage, where the fund has intervened in the context of third-party liability coverage.

== The FGAO's fields of intervention ==
=== Traffic and hunting accidents ===
The original purpose of the Guarantee Fund for Compulsory Damage Insurance (FGAO) was to provide compensation for victims of road traffic accidents. This mission was later extended to include accidents related to hunting activities.

==== Compensation conditions ====
To be eligible for compensation, the victim must be either a French national, a national of a European Union member state, or a resident of France. Additionally, the victim must have a right to compensation against a third party. This requirement reflects the principle of subsidiarity, whereby the FGAO does not compensate individuals who do not have a liable party, such as a sole driver responsible for their own accident.

Compensation is granted when the liable party is either unknown or known but uninsured. The absence of insurance may be due to the failure to take out a policy, the cancellation of an existing policy, or the insurer contesting coverage after the fact, for example by invoking the nullity or suspension of the contract. (Note: This is the case if the insured has not paid the premium (Insurance code, art. L. 113-3 and R. 211-13 2°). The contract is maintained, but the insurer's coverage is suspended until the premium due has been paid.)

The accident must have occurred in metropolitan France, the French overseas departments, or Mayotte. This geographic limitation excludes compensation for accidents occurring abroad. The incident must involve a land motor vehicle and may occur on either public or private property. The FGAO is also authorized to compensate for damage caused by a person moving on the ground or by an animal. (Note: It must be a traffic accident. This is not the case, for example, with a bite or sting.) Compensation is excluded in cases of intentional fault and damage. (Note: e.g. a collision deliberately caused by one of the drivers who wanted to cause injuries to the other: Cass. Civ. 2e, March 2, 1994.)

While bodily injury—both physical and economic—is covered without limit, compensation for material damage is subject to specific conditions. In road accidents or incidents involving persons moving on the ground, the victim is not eligible for compensation for material damage if the responsible party is unknown and the accident did not result in bodily injury. This limitation, which also applies to accidents involving unidentified animals, aims to reduce the risk of fraud. Furthermore, article A. 421-1-1 of the French Insurance Code imposes a ceiling of 1,300,000 euros per claim for material damage.

Article L. 421-6 of the Insurance Code delegates technical details of the compensation procedure to regulatory authorities. The applicable conditions vary depending on whether the responsible party is unknown, known but uninsured, or if the coverage is disputed.

Claims must be submitted to the FGAO by registered letter with acknowledgement of receipt, including all necessary information to determine eligibility, especially the establishment of third-party liability. The law of 5 July 1985, known as the Badinter Law, equates the FGAO with an insurer and subjects it to the same compensation procedures, including deadlines for making offers.

If the responsible party is unknown, this must be recorded in the official police report, which must be transmitted to the FGAO within ten days. Victims or their beneficiaries must file a claim with the fund within three years of the accident and must reach a settlement or initiate legal proceedings within five years.

If the responsible party is known but uninsured, the police report must specify this status. Within five years of the accident, the victim must either initiate legal action against the responsible party and inform the fund, (Note: By sending a copy of the document initiating the proceedings if it is a civil court (Insurance code, art. R. 421-15 al. 2); by notifying the plaintiff by registered letter of his civil party status if it is a criminal court (Insurance code, art. R. 421-15 al. 4).) or reach a settlement, which must be communicated to the FGAO within one month. The claim must then be submitted within one year of the final decision or settlement.

If the responsible party is known and insured, the FGAO does not intervene. The law of 22 May 2019, known as the PACTE law, amended Article L. 211-7-1 of the Insurance Code, making the annulment of a contract for intentional misrepresentation in motor insurance unenforceable against victims. This reform reduced the scope of the FGAO's intervention in cases involving disputed coverage, and placed responsibility on insurers to compensate victims in such situations, thereby reaffirming the fund’s role in cases where victims have no other means of recourse.

As of today, the operation of the FGAO is governed by Articles L. 421-1 to L. 421-17, R. 421-1 to R. 423-18, and A. 421-1 to A. 421-3 of the French Insurance Code.

==== Subsidiary intervention ====
According to Article L. 421-1 of the French Insurance Code, the Guarantee Fund for Compulsory Damage Insurance (FGAO) intervenes only when compensation cannot be obtained under any other legal provision. The fund's intervention is therefore strictly subsidiary. The term "other capacity" refers to all other potential sources of compensation, including private insurers or third-party payers. If a loss has already been compensated by another party, such as a property insurer or a liable third party, the FGAO is excluded from the case. (Note: This is not the case, for example, with personal insurance such as disability insurance.) The fund cannot be held jointly liable or ordered to contribute to the compensation.

==== Extension to hunting accidents ====
The scope of the FGAO was extended to hunting-related accidents by Law No. 66-497 of 11 July 1966, followed by Decree No. 68-170 of 19 February 1968. This expansion led to a renaming of the fund from "Automobile Guarantee Fund" to "Guarantee Fund for Traffic and Hunting Accidents." Compensation under this provision applies only to bodily injuries resulting from hunting activities and does not extend to French Guiana.

=== Technological hazards ===
Law No. 2003-699 of 30 July 2003, enacted in the aftermath of the explosion at the AZF plant in Toulouse on September 21, 2001, introduced a new compensation framework for technological disasters. The relevant provisions, listed in Articles L. 128-1 and following of the Insurance Code, mirror the system used for natural disasters. Under these rules, property insurance covering residential premises and private motor vehicles must include protection against damage caused by technological accidents.

A technological disaster, as defined by law, must result from an incident at a classified facility—whether declared or authorized—that causes severe damage to at least 500 residential units, rendering them uninhabitable. A state of technological disaster is formally declared within 15 days by a joint decree from the ministers responsible for the economy, civil protection, and the environment.

Under Article L. 421-16 of the French Insurance Code, the Guarantee Fund for Compulsory Damage Insurance (FGAO) was responsible for compensating uninsured victims of such disasters for property damage, up to a maximum of €100,000 per claim. However, this provision was repealed by the Law of 22 May 2019 (commonly referred to as the PACTE Law), which amended the Insurance Code and abolished this mission.

=== Mining hazards ===
Since 1 September 1998, the FGAO has been authorized to provide compensation for damage to primary residences resulting from mining activity. Compensation is capped at €300,000 per claim and is intended to supplement payments made by private insurance policies. Claims must be submitted within six months of the damage, along with supporting documentation to establish eligibility.

=== Failure of an insurance company ===
The Financial Security Law of 2003 expanded the responsibilities of the FGAO to include protection for policyholders affected by the failure of insurance companies providing mandatory coverage, such as motor vehicle liability or construction damage insurance. A subsequent ordinance issued in 2017 refined the scope of this mission, limiting it to insurers licensed in France or operating under the European freedom to provide services. In such cases, the FGAO may provide compensation of up to 90% of the amount owed by the defaulting insurer. Claims must be submitted within five years from the date the insurer’s license is withdrawn.

=== Equivalent mechanism in Belgium ===
Belgium has a similar institution known as the Belgian Common Guarantee Fund. Established in 1957 as an association, the FCGB is responsible for compensating victims of traffic accidents when the liable party is either unknown or not insured. It operates under legal provisions governing compulsory motor insurance and compensation for accident victims. The fund also serves as the national compensation, guarantee, and information center as defined by Directive 2009/103/EC of the European Parliament and Council, which harmonizes motor insurance across the European Union.

== General managers ==
- 1992-2009: Alain Bourdelat;
- 2009-2016: François Werner;
- since 2016: Julien Rencki.

== See also ==
- Guarantee fund for victims of terrorism and other offences
- Asbestos victims' compensation fund
- Guarantee fund for policyholders against the default of life and health insurance companies
- Crime Victim Compensation Commission
