= University of Rennes 1 =

Former French university

Coordinates: 48°07′05″N 1°38′17″W

- Université de Rennes I
- Motto: La volonté de progresser, d'innover, d'entreprendre The will to progress, innovate, and undertake
- Type: Public
- Active: 1970–2023
- Endowment: €280 M
- President: David Alis
- Academic staff: 1,619
- Students: 26,401
- Location: Rennes, Brittany, France
- Campus: Rennes, Lannion, Saint-Brieuc, Saint-Malo
- Website: www.univ-rennes1.fr

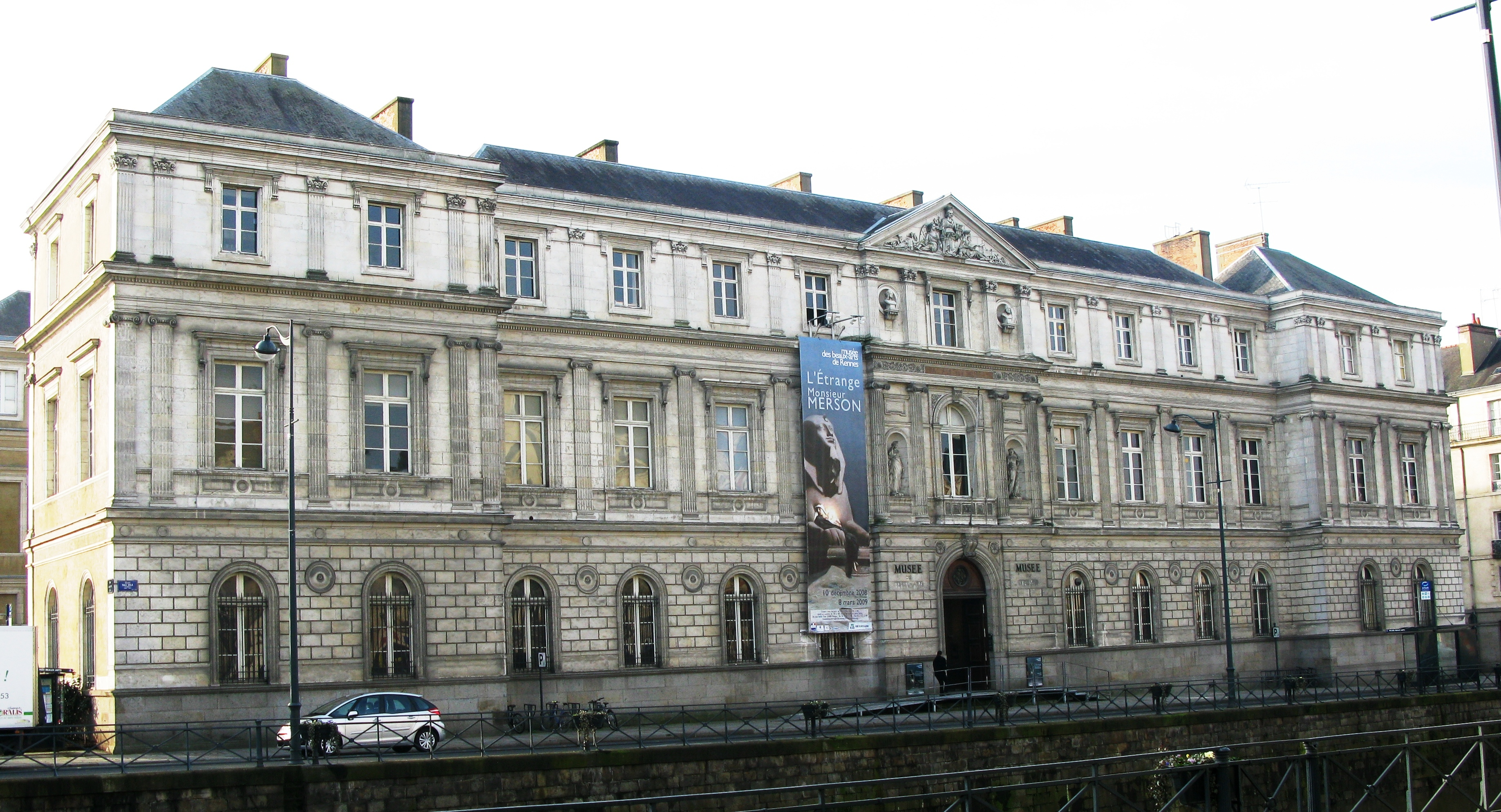
Former Palais Universitaire of the University of Rennes, the city's museum of arts of today

The University of Rennes 1 was a public university located in Rennes, France. It was founded in 1970, after splitting of the historic University of Rennes into two universities. On January 1, 2023, the University of Rennes 1 merged with five grandes écoles: Ecole des Hautes Etudes en Santé Publique, École nationale supérieure de chimie de Rennes, ENS Rennes, INSA Rennes and Sciences-Po Rennes to create the new University of Rennes.

== History ==
=== Creation of the University of Brittany ===
Asked by Francis II, Duke of Brittany, the Pope created the first university of Brittany in Nantes in 1460. It taught arts, medicine, law, and theology. In 1728, the mayor of Nantes, Gérard Mellier, asked that the university be moved to Rennes, which was more trade orientated already had the Parliament of Brittany. The law school was moved the Rennes in 1730. In 1793 the French Revolution closed all universities and it was not before 1806 that the Law school reopened in Rennes.

=== Development of the faculties in Rennes ===
In 1808, Napoleon I reorganized the universities in France, creating the University of France. From the 2 original cities housing the University of Brittany, only Rennes was included in this University. Nantes had to wait until 1970 to have again its university. In 1810 a faculty of letters opened, which gathered in 1839 five schools (French literature, foreign literature, ancient literature, history, and philosophy). The science faculty opened still in Rennes in 1840. Those 3 faculties remained without clear boundaries between them until 1885 with the creation of a "Conseil des facultés" which took in 1896 the name of University of Rennes. In the middle of the 19th century, they were gathered in the Palais Universitaire, located currently in the Quai Émile Zola, but were then scattered downtown. The faculty of law and the faculty of letter were thus relocated in 1909 in the Séminaire, located currently in the Place Hoche.

=== Creation of the University of Rennes 1 ===
In 1969, in order to enforce the growth of French universities, a law was passed, splitting the University of Rennes into two new entities. This new university took the name of "University of Rennes 1".

=== Creation of the new University of Rennes ===
In 2023, the University of Rennes 1 merged with five Grandes écoles: Ecole des Hautes Etudes en Santé Publique, École nationale supérieure de chimie de Rennes, ENS Rennes, INSA Rennes and Sciences-Po Rennes in the 'UNIR' project, in order to create the new University of Rennes. The University of Rennes 2 with other research institutes (CNRS, INRAE, Inria, Inserm and CHU de Rennes) are associated with the project. The six establishments will be grouped together in an 'Experimental Public Establishment' (EPE), weighing nearly 7,000 staff and teachers, including a thousand researchers, 156 research laboratories and 60,000 of the 68,000 students in the Breton capital, including 7,000 international students.

== Location ==
Map showing the two main campuses of Rennes 1, as well as other small sites within the city.

Most of the university's 1.64 km^{2} of grounds lie within the city boundary of Rennes, but it has other sites dotted around Brittany. The three main campuses are in Beaulieu (in the east of Rennes), Villejean (in the north-west of Rennes) and a central campus.

Situated in the north-east of the city, the Beaulieu campus is a large complex that was still in development in 1969. Beaulieu is the home of more than a dozen science buildings (for the Faculties of mathematics, physics, biology and other schools such as the INSA) and one of philosophy. The sports facilities and the students' entertainment building are also located there.

University rankings

Global – Overall
- QS World: 711-720 (2026)

In the north-west, the Villejean campus gathers Rennes 2's Faculties of Foreign Languages, Arts, Human Sciences and Social Sciences. Rennes I University's Faculty of Medicine is located on the edge of this Villejean campus, nearby Brittany's largest hospital center, Pontchaillou.

The city center holds two separate buildings: the Faculty of Law and Political Science, and the Faculty of Economical Science, in front of which a cloister houses the two faculties' library.

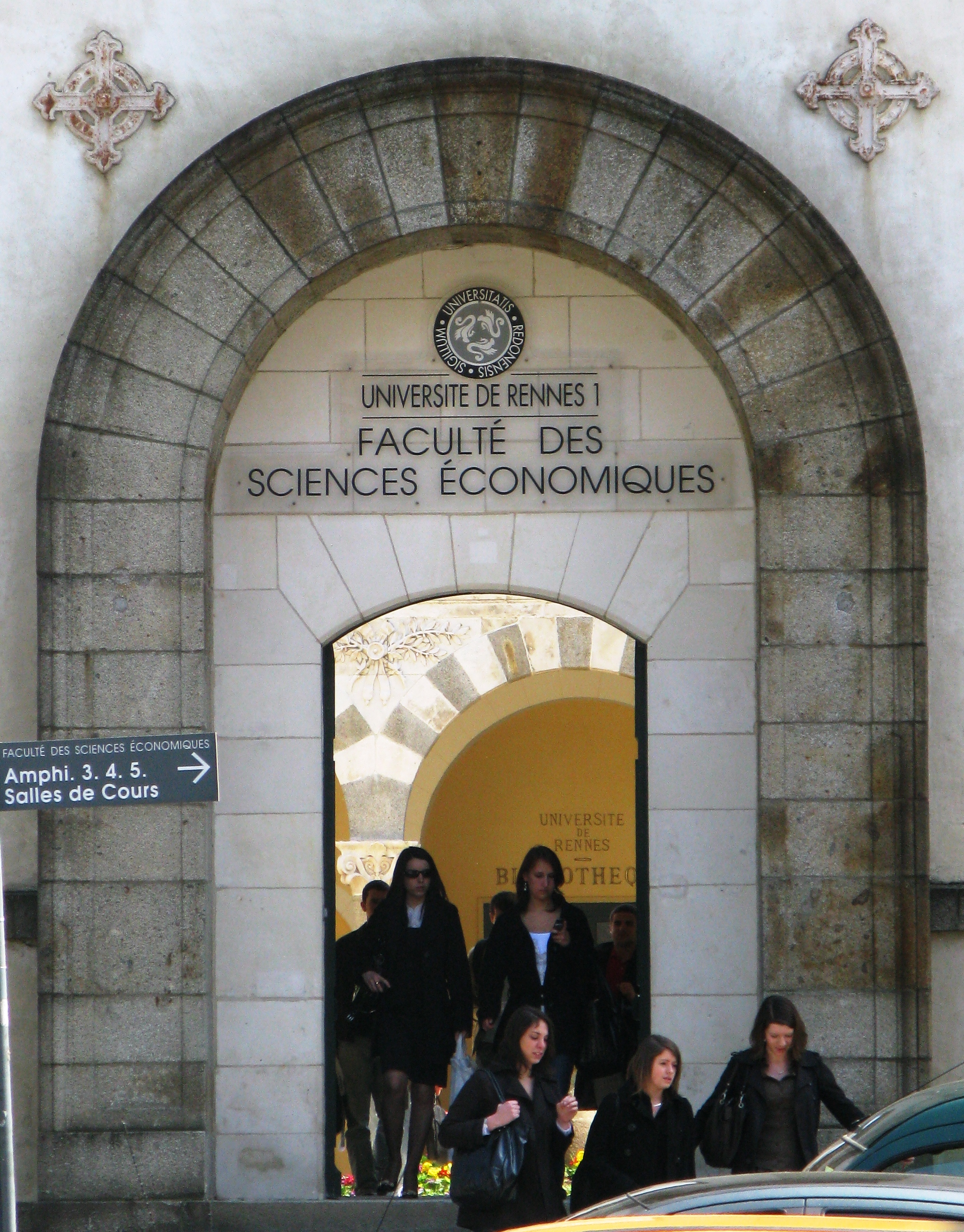
Faculty of Economics entry

There are other sites in Lannion, Saint-Brieuc, Saint-Malo, Fougères and Dinard; some research centers in Monterfil, Paimpont and the isle of Bailleron; and a museum owned by the university in Penmarch.

== Affiliated institutions ==
=== Institute of technology of Saint-Malo ===
Institute of Technology of Saint-Malo (or IUT of Saint-Malo) is a French higher education institution founded in 1994 and located in Saint-Malo. It is attached to the University of Rennes 1 and trains students from BAC to BAC +3 level. The Saint-Malo University Institute of Technology delivers two types of degrees: the University Technology Diplomas and Professional Licenses.

== People ==
=== Alumni ===
- Julien Chaisse (born 1976), professor of law
- Yves Cochet, (1946), mathematician, politician
- Yves Coppens (1934), academic, paleontologist
- Alexandre Léontieff (1970), politician, former President of French Polynesia.
- Ricardo Bonilla, politician, economist, Colombian Minister of Finance and Public Credit.

=== Faculty ===
- Louis Le Duff, billionaire businessman
- Félix Dujardin (1801–1860)
- Edmond Hervé, mayor of Rennes from 1977 to 2008
- Louis Le Pensec (1937), politician
- Marcel Planiol

== Points of interest ==
- Jardin botanique de l'Université de Rennes

== See also ==
- List of modern universities in Europe (1801–1945)
- University of Rennes 2
- IEP Rennes
- IFSIC
- Law schools and colleges in France
