= Peter Wiedemann =

German ophthalmologist (born 1953)

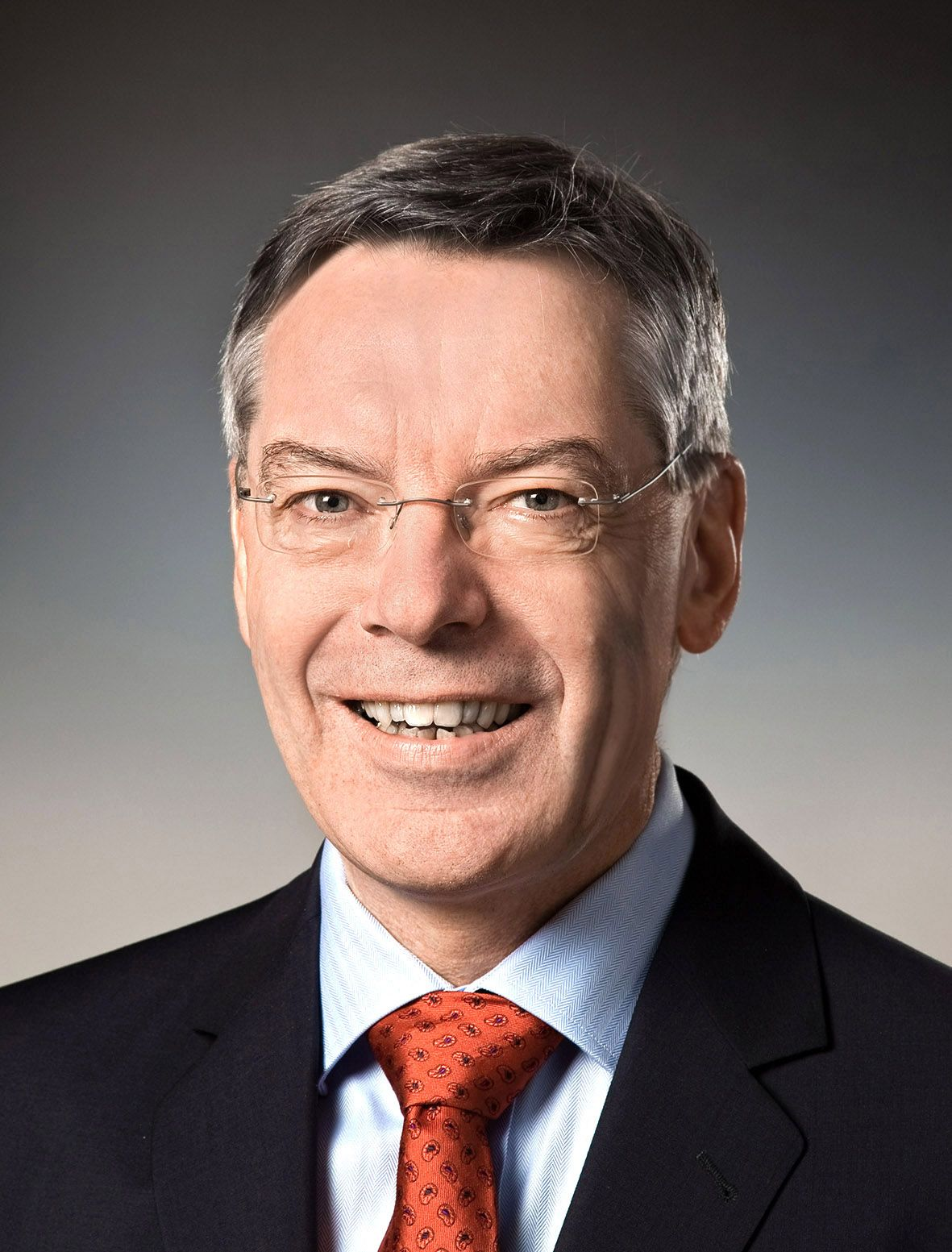
Peter Wiedemann

Peter Wiedemann (born 23 October 1953 in Erlangen, West Germany) is a German ophthalmologist, specialist in medical and surgical retina and was head at the Department of Ophthalmology at the Leipzig University, Germany, from 1993 to 2021.

== Education ==
After finishing high school in Ingolstadt, he studied medicine at Ruhr University Bochum, the University of Rennes, Stanford University and at the University of Erlangen–Nuremberg. The following four years he spent in the field of pharmacology, beginning his work at LMU Munich. During a research stay at the Doheny Eye Institute of the University of Southern California in Los Angeles he worked for Stephen J. Ryan. K. Heimann, who later became his teacher during the succeeding residency at the University of Cologne, and Stephen J. Ryan became his mentors and the most influential persons of his academic and clinical life. After his residency, he stayed in Cologne till 1993. At the age of 39, he got the position of professor and chair at Leipzig University. Along with his clinical work in Leipzig, he continued his research work in the field of macular degeneration, diabetic retinopathy and proliferative vitreoretinopathy (PVR).

He was a member of the directorate of the University Hospital of Leipzig (1995–1999), the Executive Vice President of the Leipzig University (2003–2006), the President of the Saxonian Ophthalmological Society (1994, 1999, 2005, 2008 and 2012), the President of the German Ophthalmological Society (2009) and member of the Club Jules Gonin Executive Committee (2000–2006).

He is currently the Secretary General of the Academia Ophthalmologica Internationalis, a board member of the ICO (International Council of Ophthalmology), the Scientific Program Chair for the World Ophthalmology Congress (WOC) (since June 2010), member of the German Academy of Sciences Leopoldina, member of the European Academy of Ophthalmology as well as of the European Board of Ophthalmology and guest professor of Fourth Military Medical University, Xi'an, China.

== Honors and awards ==
- 1988 Chibret Fellowship
- 1989 Prix Galien
- 1993 Science Price of the Rheinisch Westfällische Augenärzte
- 1996 Henley Lecture
- 1997 Lecture Argentina Ophthalmological Society
- 1997 BEAVRS Alcon Professorship
- 1998 Lecture Japanese Ophthalmological Society
- 1998 Gonin Lecture
- 2000 EVER Lecture
- 2004 Montgomery Lecture
- 2010 Doheny Scholar
- 2011 ARVO Silver Fellow

== Publications ==
Wiedemann has published more than 400 peer reviewed papers and eight books. His clinical papers focus on proliferative vitreoretinopathy (PVR), age-related macular degeneration (AMD), central retinal vein occlusion (CRVO), myopia and diabetic retinopathy. His basic science papers concern the role of retinal pigment epithelial (RPE) or Muller cells in retinal diseases. As the co-editor of the Ryan's RETINA 5th edition, the standard reference for retinologist worldwide, he was responsible for the surgical section.
