= Huê-Tâm Jamme =

French urban planner

Academic background
- Education: Sciences Po Rennes (BA), (MA); University of Southern California (PhD)
- Thesis: Productive Frictions: A Theory of Mobility and Street Commerce Grounded in Vietnam’s Motorbike-Centric Urbanism (2020)

Huê-Tâm Jamme is a French urban planner and academic, focused on urban development in Vietnam.

== Career ==
=== Productive frictions ===
Jamme's 2020 thesis, focused on Ho Chi Minh City, Vietnam, developed the "productive frictions" conceptualization of cities organized around two-wheeler usage and their relationship with commerce. Jamme argued that the slow speed of motorbikes supports vibrant street life, as they support "productive frictions" between people in transit and the surrounding built environment.

In October 2021, the dissertation won the Association of Collegiate Schools of Planning’s Barclay Gibbs Award.

== Publications ==
- A twenty-five year biography of the TOD Concept: From design to policy and implementation (2019)
