= Julien Chaisse =

Professor of Law

- Born: 1976 (age 49–50); Avignon, France

Academic background
- Education: Aix-Marseille University (LLB); University of Tübingen (Master's degree); University of Rennes 1 (LLM); Paul Cézanne University Aix-Marseille III (PhD)

Academic work
- Discipline: Law
- Sub-discipline: International law International arbitration
- Institutions: City University of Hong Kong

Julien Chaisse (Chinese: 夏竹立; born 1976 in Avignon, France) is a professor of law at City University of Hong Kong, specializing in international law, with a particular focus on globalization, foreign investment and digital assets.

== Education ==
Chaisse received his LLB from the Faculty of Law and Political Science, Aix-Marseille University in 1998. He earned his master's degree from the University of Tübingen in 1999 and an LLM degree from the University of Rennes 1 in 2000. In 2004, Chaisse started his doctoral dissertation at the Institut d'etudes politiques d'Aix-en-Provence of Paul Cézanne University Aix-Marseille III, where he became affiliated as a teacher and a researcher.

== Academic activities ==
From 2007 to 2010, Chaisse worked at the World Trade Institute in Switzerland coordinating a project on multilateral rules on investment, as Alternate Leader of the NCCR-Trade Regulation's Individual Project 11 (2007–2009). In 2009, Chaisse joined the newly established Faculty of Law at the Chinese University of Hong Kong (CUHK), and, in 2013, become Director of the Centre for Financial Regulation and Economic Development. Chaisse's experiences living in Asia and Switzerland, with their disparate conditions concerning the availability of freshwater, led him to advocate for the development of "a global legal framework to oversee the business of supplying water, particularly across borders". Under this interest, Chaisse has advised various national governments in crafting water-investment contracts.

Chaisse edited and contributed to the festschrift for Mitsuo Matsushita in 2016, including a chapter examining international economic laws potentially regulating State-Controlled Entities and Sovereign Wealth Funds, and highlighting "a considerable risk of incoherence" for their operations. Chaisse and Sufian Jusoh's 2016 book, The ASEAN Comprehensive Investment Agreement: The Regionalization of Laws and Policy on Foreign Investment, was positively reviewed in Foreign Trade Review, as was Chaisse, Jusoh, and Tomoko Ishikawa's 2017 book, Asia's Changing International Investment Regime: Sustainability, Regionalization, and Arbitration.

In 2019, Chaisse joined the School of Law, City University of Hong Kong. In the 2020, Times Higher Education (THE) Law Rankings, City University of Hong Kong School of Law was ranked joint 25th in the world. Chaisse's 2019 book China's International Investment Strategy (Oxford University Press) received important acclaims as "an invaluable contribution to our understanding of China's international investment law strategy across domestic, bilateral regional and global levels" and "a must-have for all who wish or need to understand China-related investment disputes. This will be for many years to come a major work for China scholars and practitioners alike". As of 2020, he serves as co-editor-in-chief of the Asia Pacific Law Review. He also became the President of the Asia Pacific Foreign Direct Investment Network (APFN). As of 2024, he also serves as co-editor-in-chief of the Journal of World Investment & Trade.

== Awards and influence ==
Chaisse received the CUHK Research Excellence Award in 2012. He received the CUHK Vice-Chancellor's Exemplary Teaching Award in 2015. In recognition of his important academic contribution to international law, Chaisse received the CUHK's Vice-Chancellor's Young Researcher Award 2017.

In 2020, Chaisse was awarded the Tenth annual Smit-Lowenfeld Prize which is awarded annually by the International Arbitration Club of New York to recognize an outstanding article published in the previous year on any aspect of international arbitration. He joined the ranks of the Prize Recipients who are only top lawyers, including Nicolas Ulmer, Charles H. Brower II, Gary Born, Stephen Fietta & James Upcher, Catharine Titi, Louie Llamzon & Anthony Sinclair, Grant Hanessian & Alexandra Dosman, Simon Batifort & Benton Heath, and Soterios Loizou. The Prize honours the late Hans Smit of Columbia Law School and Andreas F. Lowenfeld of New York University School of Law. Chaisse argues that "Given the rapidly changing cybersphere, digitisation of companies, and the forecast for investment in digital infrastructure globally, future claims are likely to emerge. To avoid uncertainty and eliminate risk, states can proactively address these issues by updating their BIT language to include cyber risk and digital assets."

== Other professional activities ==
In addition to his teaching and writing, Chaisse sits on the Trade and Investment Council of the World Economic Forum, and various other international legal advisory bodies such as the World Free Zone Convention (WFZC) and Academy of International Dispute Resolution & Professional Negotiation (AIDRN). Chaisse has noted the increasing use of Special Economic Zones to draw foreign investment to regions, and the potential for conflicts to arise from the divergence between the local management of these zones and their host countries, which are the recognized actors in international law. Chaisse is also member of the Internet Corporation for Assigned Names and Numbers (ICANN) in which he serves on the Working Group on gTLDs' rights protection mechanisms review and the Accountability and Transparency Review program. He contributed to the Initial Report of the Review of All Rights Protection Mechanisms in All gTLDs Policy Development Process released on 18 March 2020. In 2020, Chaisse addressed economic challenges of the COVID-19 pandemic, citing the lack of cooperation between countries as a core problem, contending that "as long as there is no cooperation among them to decide when to lift these controls, the effect on the economy will be felt for quite some time". He has been involved in major disputes settlements in particular in Eastern Europe and Asia pacific.

== Publications ==
Chaisse has published academic articles in some of the best law journals, including the Stanford Journal of International Law, American Journal of International, Journal of International Economic Law, World Trade Review, Journal of World Trade.

Chaisse has published many books on various topics such as:

- "The Black Pit:" Power and Pitfalls of Digital FDI and Cross-Border Data Flows," 22(1) World Trade Review 73-89 (2023)
- International Economic Law and Governance-- Essays in the Honour of Mitsuo Matsushita (London: Oxford University Press, 2016)
- The ASEAN Comprehensive Investment Agreement: The Regionalization of Laws and Policy on Foreign Investment, was positively reviewed in Foreign Trade Review (2016)
- International Investment Treaties and Arbitration Across Asia (Boston: Brill, Nijhoff International Investment Law Series, 2017)
- Asia's Changing International Investment Regime: Sustainability, Regionalization, and Arbitration (2017)
- The Regulation of Global Water Services Market (London: Cambridge University Press, 2017)
- China's International Investment Strategy-- Bilateral, Regional, and Global Law and Policy (London: Oxford University Press, 2019) was positively reviewed in the Journal of International Economic Law and ICSID Review
- Sixty Years of European Integration and Global Power Shifts-- Perceptions, Interactions and Lessons (London: Hart, Modern Studies in European Law, 2020) was positively reviewed in the Journal of Common Markets Studies
- Wine Law and Policy: From National Terroirs to a Global Market (Boston: Brill, 2021)
- Handbook of International Investment Law and Policy, 2021 edition

== Press ==
Chaisse is a frequent guest on National Press Foundation activities and he has been featured in some of the world's leading business publications such as The Wall Street Journal, Financial Times, Al Jazeera International, The Straits Times, Nikkei Review, Financier Worldwide, and International Financial Law Review. He is also often interviewed by general newspapers such as Politico, South Asia Morning Post, Journal du Dimanche, Journal de Montreal, Vietnam Tuổi Trẻ daily newspaper, Bangkok Post.
