= Instituts d'études politiques =

Group of political science universities in France

Instituts d'études politiques (French pronunciation: [ɛ̃stity detyd pɔlitik]; English: Institutes of Political Studies), or IEP's, colloquially referred to as Sciences Po, are eleven publicly owned institutions of higher learning in France. They are located in Aix-en-Provence, Bordeaux, Grenoble, Lille, Lyon, Paris, Rennes, Strasbourg, Toulouse, since 2014 Saint-Germain-en-Laye and since 2022 Fontainebleau. Their vocation is the study and research of contemporary political science. All students at the IEPs study a curriculum that is highly practical and broad-based, focusing on the full range of the social sciences across law, economics, finance, and management. These schools are considered as some of the most selective in France, mainly because they are the place where many political and business leaders are trained.

These establishments are more widely known under the name of Sciences Po. Sciences Po Paris is considered to be the most prestigious of all the IEP's in France, and is the only one allowed to refer to itself with the epithet "Sciences Po" without indicating the name of the city where it is located, under a legal agreement with the other IEP's. Other IEP's can use the term "Sciences Po" to refer to themselves only when followed by the names of the cities where they are located, such as "Sciences Po Aix" or "Sciences Po Grenoble". Other IEPs in France were created after the Paris one, apart from Strasbourg, which was created by the same law but with the status of an internal institute of the Robert Schuman University.

According to article 2 of an 18 December 1989 decree, their mission is:

1. to contribute to the training of higher civil servants as well as executives in the public, para-public and private sectors, notably in the State and decentralized communities
2. to develop the research in political and administrative sciences

The Sciences Po approach and style inspired many universities in France but also abroad. The most famous example the London School of Economics, founded on the model of the Ecole Libre des Sciences Politiques.

== Grande École System ==
Sciences Po institutes are a type of Grande École, a French institution of higher education that is separate from, but parallel and connected to the main framework of the French public university system. Similar to the Ivy League in the United States, Oxbridge in the UK, and C9 League in China, Grandes Écoles are elite academic institutions that admit students through an extremely competitive process., unlike French ordinary public universities which "have an obligation to accept all candidates in the same academic field".

Alumni go on to occupy elite positions within government, administration, and corporate firms in France. In particular, the Paris IEP ("Sciences Po") has produced at least seven recent French presidents (including the incumbent, Emmanuel Macron), 13 French prime ministers, 12 foreign heads of state or government, and six of the CEO's of France's largest companies.

Although they are more expensive than public universities in France, Grandes Écoles typically have much smaller class sizes and student bodies, and many of their programs are taught in English. International internships, study abroad opportunities, and close ties with government and the corporate world are a hallmark of the Grandes Écoles. Many of the top ranked schools in Europe are members of the Conférence des Grandes Écoles (CGE), as are the Sciences Po institutions. Degrees from Sciences Po are accredited by the Conférence des Grandes Écoles and awarded by the Ministry of National Education (France) (French: Le Ministère de L'éducation Nationale).

== List ==
The ten Instituts d'études politiques are:

- Institut d'études politiques de Paris (Sciences Po Paris or simply, Sciences Po)
- Institut d'études politiques d'Aix-en-Provence (Sciences Po Aix)
- Institut d'études politiques de Bordeaux (Sciences Po Bordeaux)
- Institut d'études politiques de Grenoble (Sciences Po Grenoble)
- Institut d'études politiques de Lille (Sciences Po Lille)
- Institut d'études politiques de Lyon (Sciences Po Lyon)
- Institut d'études politiques de Rennes (Sciences Po Rennes)
- Institut d'études politiques de Saint-Germain-en-Laye (Sciences Po Saint-Germain)
- Institut d'études politiques de Strasbourg (Sciences Po Strasbourg)
- Institut d'études politiques de Toulouse (Sciences Po Toulouse)

The other Instituts d'études politiques around the world are :

- Institut d'études politiques de Madagascar

== Critérium ==
Every year an inter-IEP competition is held, hosted by the hometown of one of the IEPs and attended by participants from all 10 IEPs. The first crit, as it is known colloquially, was created in 1987 by the IEPs of Bordeaux and Toulouse who decided to have a friendly rugby match.

This competition takes the form of a 3-day sports event and party, and is held over the last weekend of March, run by the host university's "Sports office". The hosting of an event generally costs about 200,000 euros, funded by the participants, as well as by sponsors and grants. The hosting of the event is rotated between the different IEPs each year.

=== Hosts ===
- 1987: IEP de Bordeaux
- 1988: IEP d'Aix-en-Provence
- 1989: IEP de Grenoble
- 1990: IEP de Toulouse
- 1991: IEP de Lyon
- 1992: IEP de Paris
- 1993: IEP de Strasbourg
- 1994: IEP de Lille
- 1995: IEP de Rennes
- 1996: IEP de Bordeaux
- 1997: IEP d'Aix-en-Provence
- 1998: IEP de Grenoble
- 1999: IEP de Toulouse
- 2000: IEP de Lyon
- 2001: IEP de Strasbourg
- 2002: IEP de Paris
- 2003: IEP de Lille
- 2004: IEP de Bordeaux
- 2005: IEP de Rennes
- 2006: IEP d'Aix-en-Provence
- 2007: IEP de Grenoble
- 2008: IEP de Toulouse
- 2009: IEP de Lyon
- 2010: IEP de Strasbourg – Choukrit
- 2011: IEP de Paris – Monarcrit
- 2012: IEP d'Aix-en-Provence – Apéricrit
- 2013: IEP de Bordeaux – Grand Crit classé
- 2014: IEP de Rennes (canceled)
- 2015: IEP de Grenoble – Les bronzés font du Crit
- 2016: IEP de Toulouse
- 2017: IEP de Lyon – Crit Gone Wild
- 2018: IEP de Strasbourg – Le Temps de Krithédrales
- 2019: IEP de Paris – L'Impéracrit
- 2020: IEP d'Aix-en-Provence – La Goire de mon Crit (canceled)

=== Traditions ===
Each of the 10 instituts has a distinctive colour and distinctive symbols and/or mascots:

- Aix-en-Provence. Colours: Red and gold. Mascot: "Pastaga-man" Symbol: An "X", cicadas
- Toulouse. Colours: Pink and white. Mascot: A pig or hog.
- Bordeaux. Colours: Red and black. Symbol: A bottle of red wine.
- Rennes. Colours: Orange and black. Mascot: A reindeer called "René".
- Paris. Colours: Yellow and black. Symbol: A lion and a fox.
- Lille. Colours: Red and white. Mascot: A giant mussel
- Strasbourg. Colours: Blue and white. Mascot: A stork called "Josy". Nicknamed the "Strohteam".
- Lyon. Colours: Blue and red. Mascot: a lion called "Lyonix".
- Grenoble. Colours: Blue and yellow. Mascot: Big Foot ("le Yéti"). Nicknamed "IKEA" due to their colours.
- Saint-Germain-en-Laye. Colours: Green and black. Symbol: a wolf.

=== Winners ===
Paris and Aix-en-Provence are the usual winners of the trophy

- 1987: IEP de Bordeaux
- 1988: IEP d'Aix-en-Provence
- 1989: IEP d'Aix-en-Provence
- 1990: —
- 1991: —
- 1992: IEP d'Aix-en-Provence
- 1993: IEP de Bordeaux
- 1994: IEP d'Aix-en-Provence
- 1995: IEP d'Aix-en-Provence
- 1996: IEP de Bordeaux
- 1997: IEP d'Aix-en-Provence
- 1998: IEP de Paris
- 1999: IEP de Toulouse
- 2000: IEP de Paris
- 2001: IEP de Paris
- 2002: IEP de Paris
- 2003: IEP de Paris
- 2004: IEP de Paris
- 2005: IEP de Paris
- 2006: IEP d'Aix-en-Provence
- 2007: IEP de Grenoble
- 2008: IEP de Grenoble
- 2009: IEP de Paris
- 2010: IEP de Grenoble
- 2011: IEP de Paris
- 2012: IEP de Paris
- 2013: IEP de Paris
