= Efemia Chela =

Zambian-Ghanaian writer, literary critic and editor (born 1991)

- Born: 1991 (age 34–35); Zambia
- Education: Rhodes University (BA)
- Occupations: Writer; literary critic

Efemia Chela (born 1991) is a Zambian-Ghanaian writer, literary critic, and editor. Her first published story, "Chicken", was shortlisted for the 2014 Caine Prize for African Writing. Chela has had short stories and poems published in New Internationalist, Wasafiri, Token and Pen Passages: Africa. In 2016, she co-edited the Short Story Day Africa collection, Migrations. She was also the Andrew W. Mellon Writer-in-Residence at Rhodes University in 2018. She is currently the Francophone and Contributing editor for The Johannesburg Review of Books.

Born in Zambia, Efemia Chela grew up in England, Ghana, Botswana and South Africa. She graduated with a BA degree in French, Politics, and Classical civilizations from Rhodes University in South Africa, and at the Institut d’Etudes Politiques in Aix-en-Provence, France. Chela's short stories have been published in Short.Sharp.Stories, Brittle Paper and most recently in As You Like It, the 2018 Gerald Kraak Award anthology. Efemia contributed an essay to Touch, a collection of essays edited by Tiffany Mugo and Kim Windvogel.
