= Kevoree =

Open source project for distributed systems

Kevoree is an open source project that aims at enabling the development of reconfigurable distributed systems. It is built around a component model, and takes advantage of the Models@Runtime approach to provide efficient tools for the development, live adaptation and synchronization of distributed Software Systems.

== History ==
The Kevoree project has been initiated by the University of Rennes / IRISA and INRIA Bretagne Atlantique. Started in 2010, Kevoree is now a mature solution to develop distributed software systems.
