= University of Rennes =

Public university in Rennes, Brittany, France

- Université de Rennes
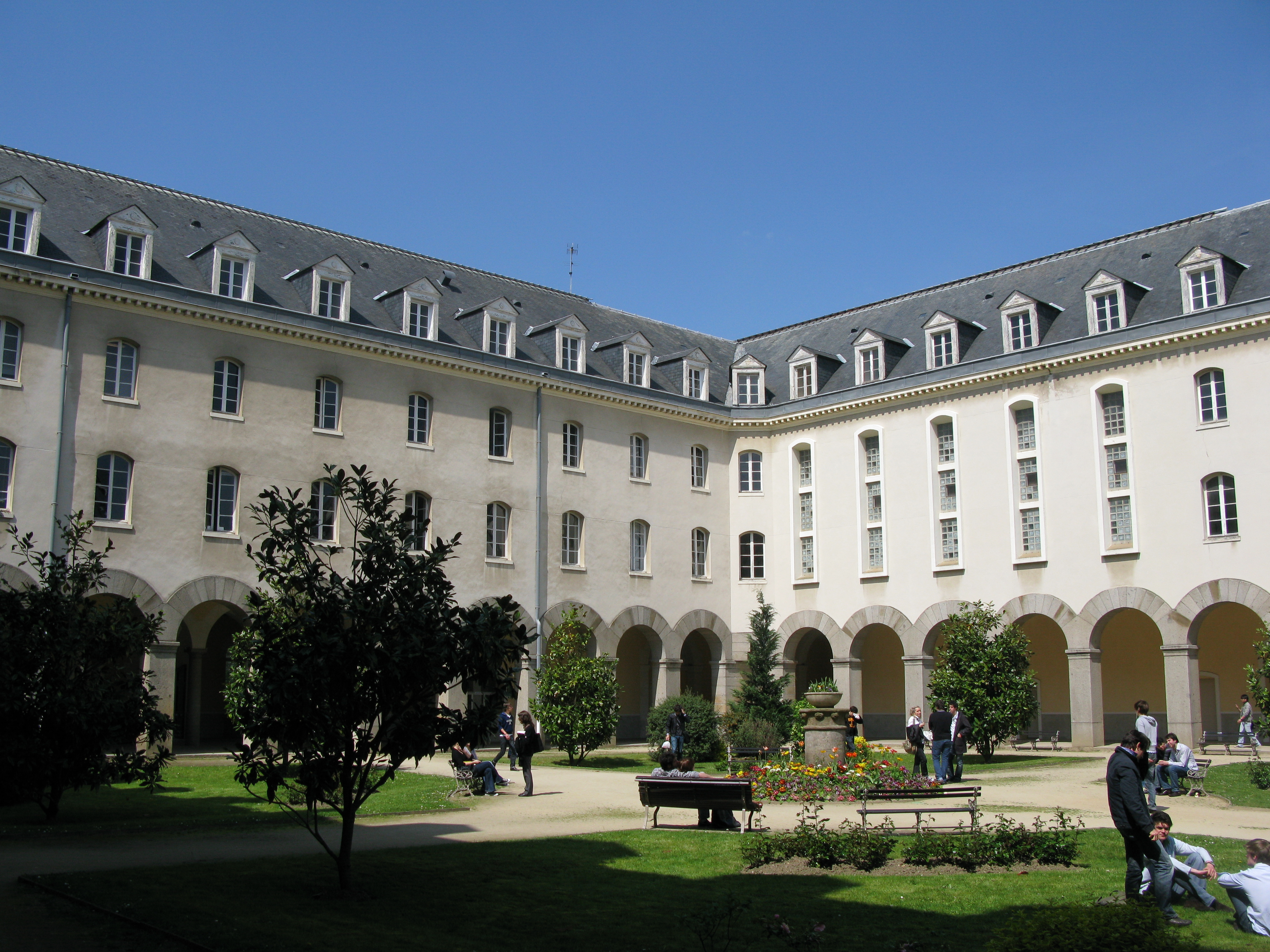
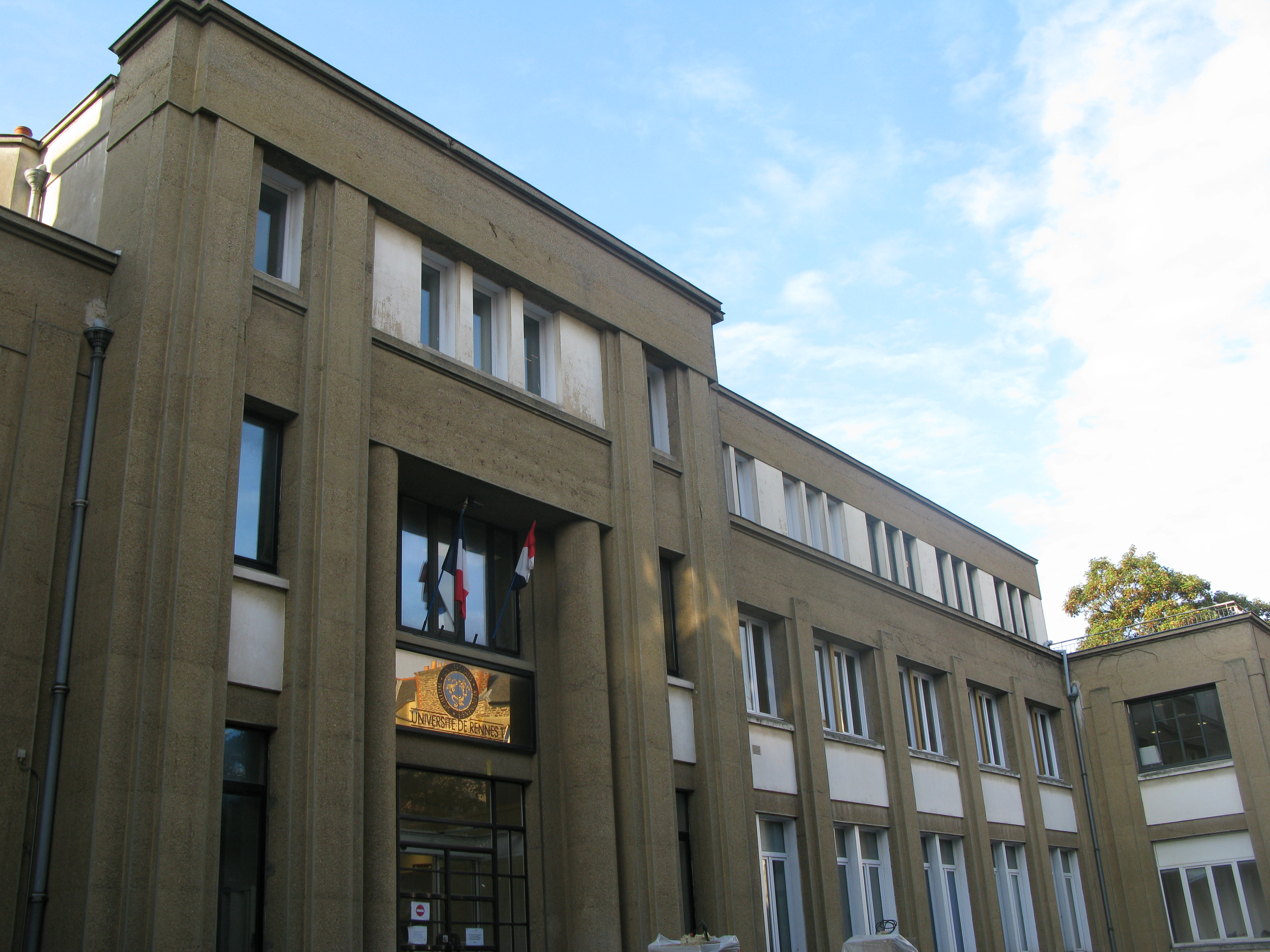
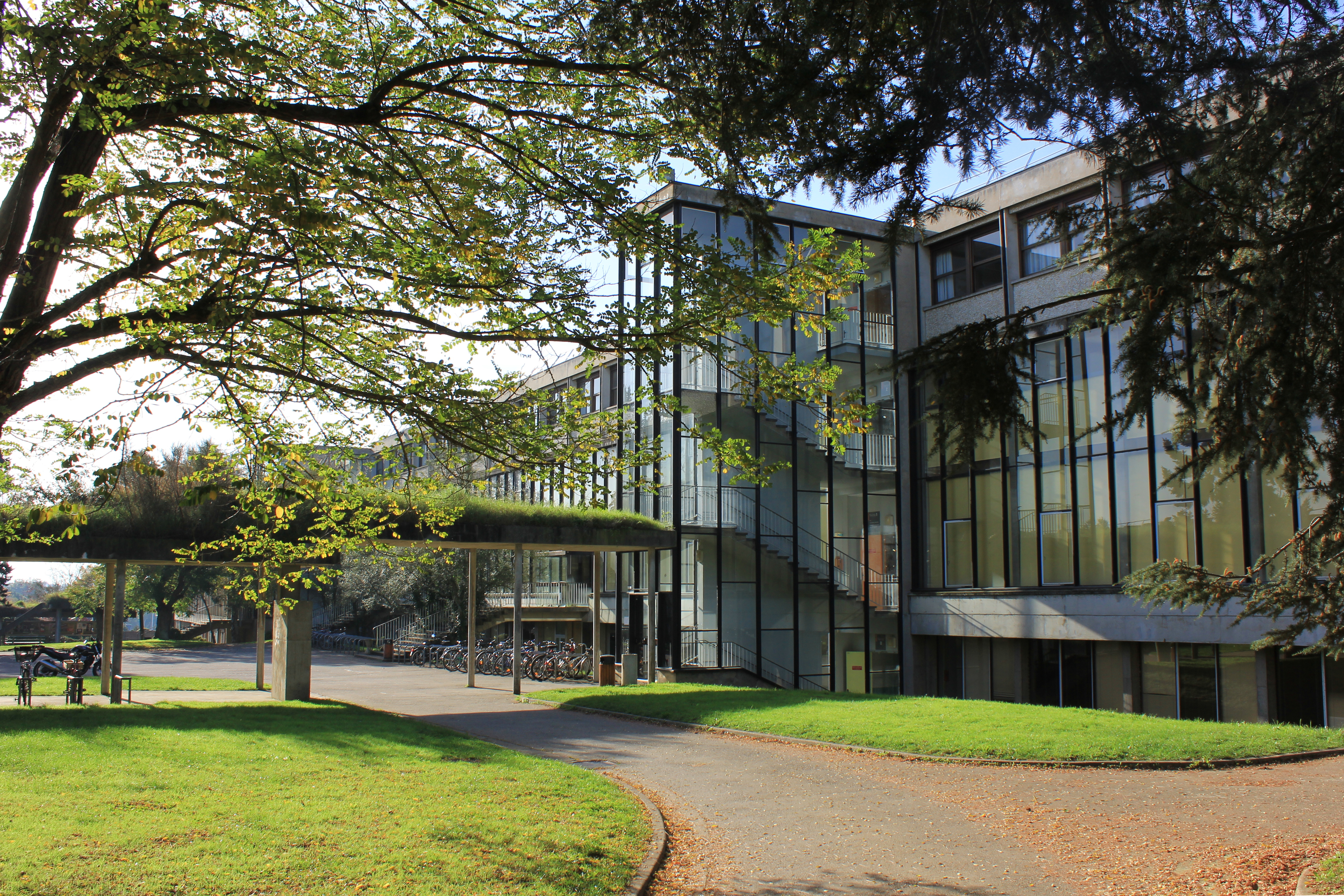
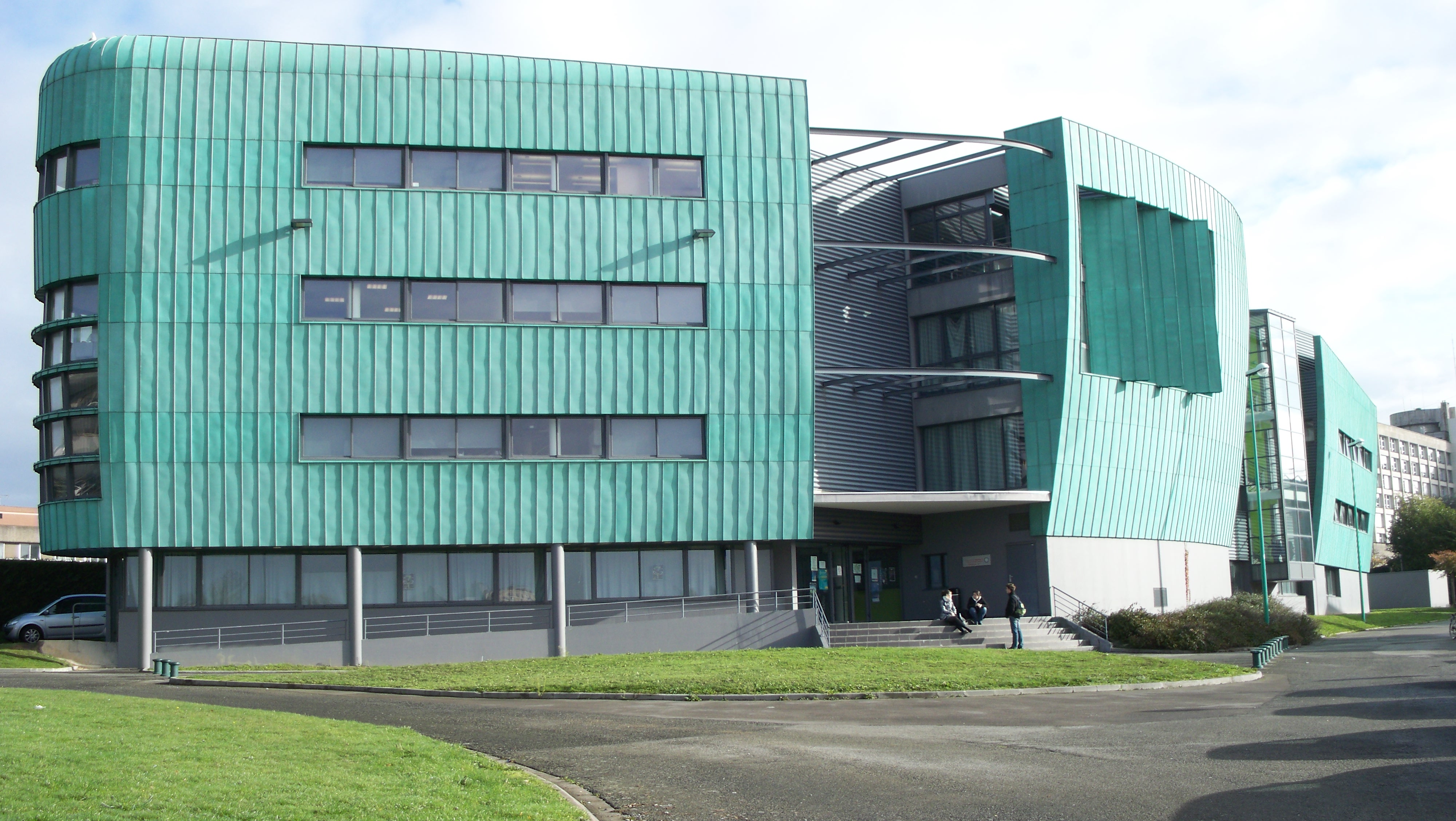
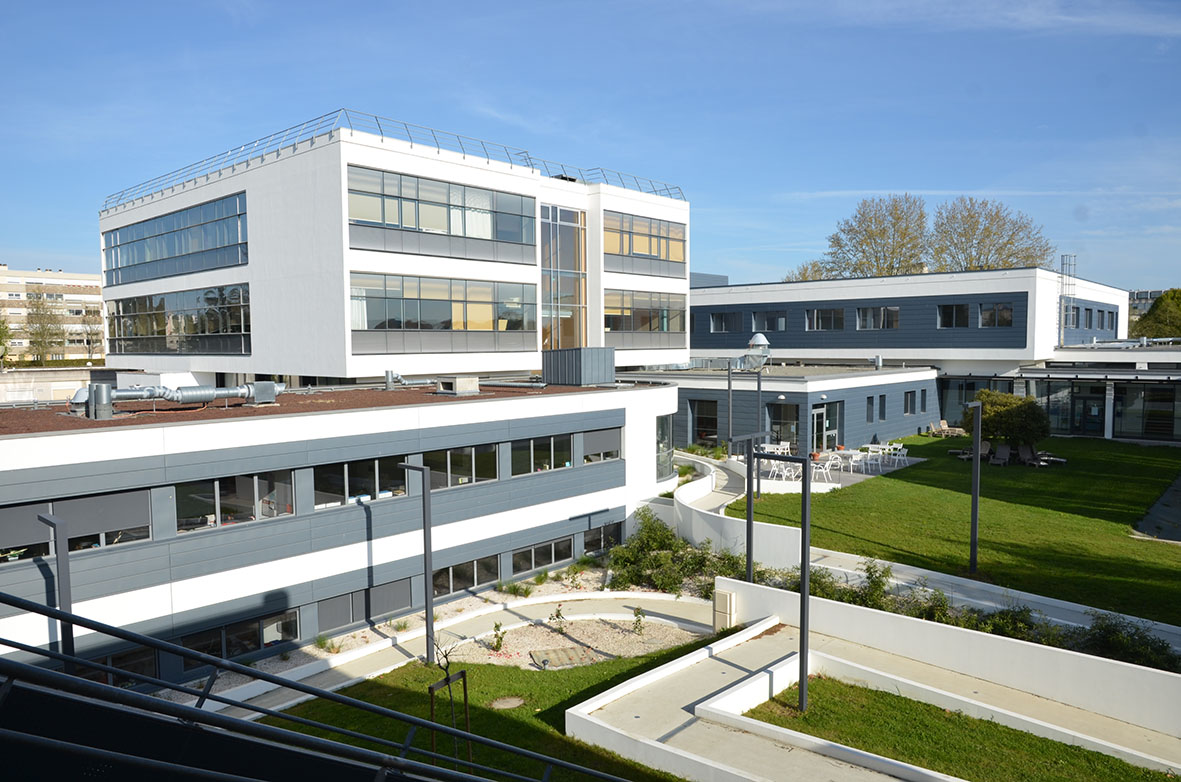
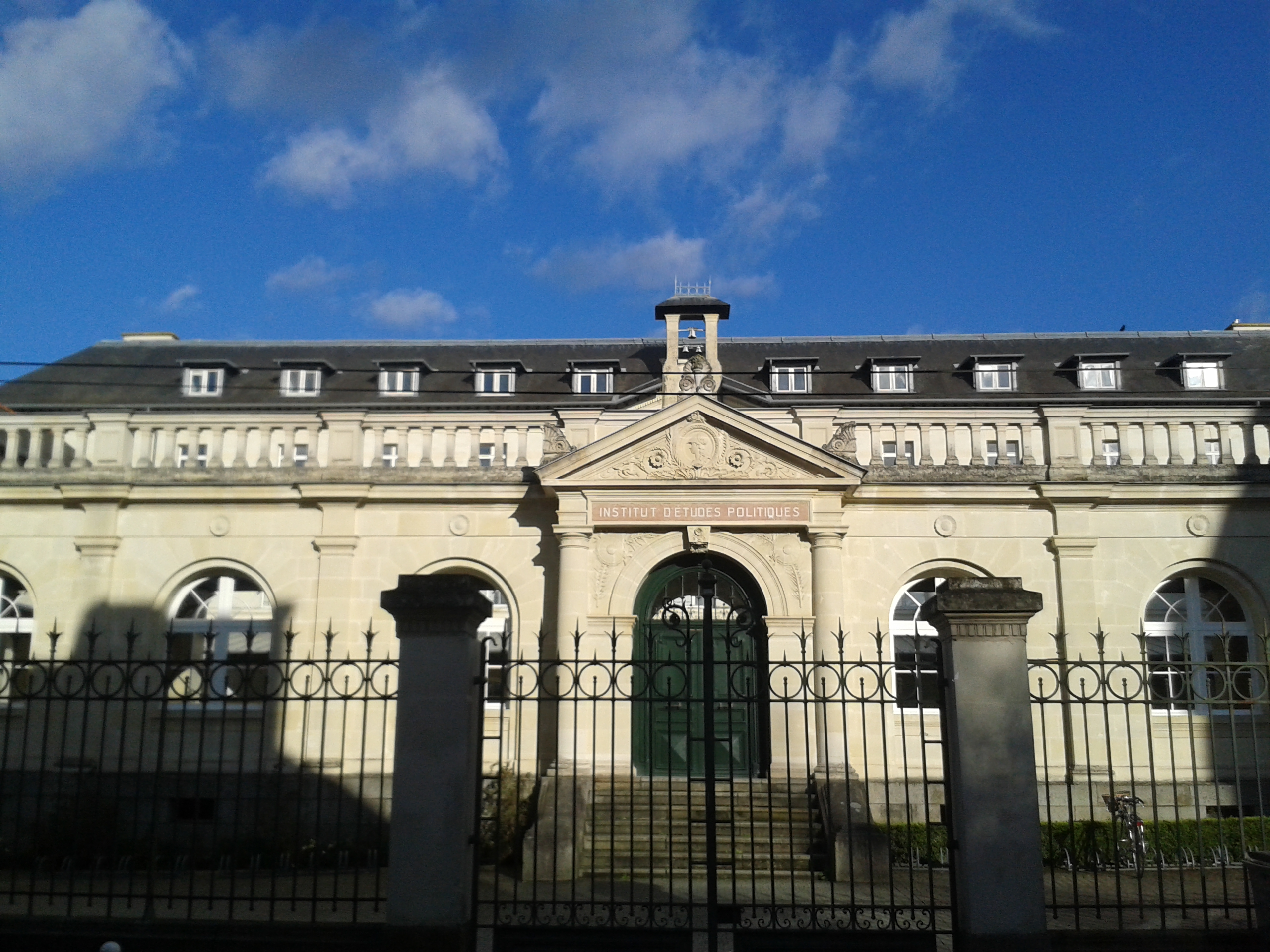
- Motto: La volonté de progresser, d'innover, d'entreprendre (French)
- Motto in English: The will to progress, innovate, and undertake
- Type: Public research non-profit coeducational higher education institution
- Established: 1460; 566 years ago (as Duke's University of Brittany); 2023 (current legal status)
- Endowment: €280 M
- President: David Alis
- Academic staff: 4,500
- Students: 37,200
- Location: Rennes, Brittany, France
- Campus: Rennes, Lannion, Saint-Brieuc, Saint-Malo
- Colors: Black and White
- Website: www.univ-rennes.fr

The University of Rennes (French: Université de Rennes) is a public research university located in Rennes, Upper Brittany, France. Originally founded in 1460, the university was split into two universities in 1970: Rennes 1 University and Rennes 2 University. On 1 January 2023, the Rennes 1 University merged with five grandes écoles—EHESP, École nationale supérieure de chimie de Rennes, ENS Rennes, INSA Rennes and Sciences-Po Rennes—to create the new University of Rennes.

The University of Rennes 2 with other research institutes (CNRS, INRAE, Inria, Inserm and CHU de Rennes) are associated with the 'UNIR' project. The six establishments will be grouped together in an 'Experimental Public Establishment' (EPE), weighing nearly 7,000 staff and teachers, including a thousand researchers, 156 research laboratories and 60,000 of the 68,000 students in the Breton capital, including 7,000 international students.

== History ==
=== 15th century ===
Coat of arms of the Duke's University of Brittany in Nantes, France, in the 17th and 18th century.

==== Beginnings in Nantes ====
The Duke's University of Brittany was founded by Bertrand Milon on 4 April 1460, on the initiative of Duke Francis II of Brittany, by a papal bull from Pope Pius II, given in Siena. This embodied Francis II's wish to assert his independence from the King of France, while universities were being opened on the outskirts of the duchy in Angers in 1432, Poitiers in 1432 and Bordeaux in 1441. Created in the form of a studium generale, this university could teach all the traditional disciplines: Arts, Theology, Law and Medicine. The student population between the end of the 15th century and the following two centuries grew to a thousand or even 1,500 students, according to the highest estimates.

A first attempt to move the university from Nantes to Rennes took place at the end of the 16th century. King Henry IV sought to punish Nantes, a league town, for its support of the Duke of Mercœur. The university was ordered to move to Rennes, a city that had remained loyal to the monarchy, in a letter of patent dated 8 August 1589. However, the institution was not moved due to a lack of funding.

=== 18th century ===
==== Transfer to Rennes ====
At the beginning of the 18th century, the university entered a phase of decline. The city of Nantes was entirely focused on commerce and its elites showed little interest in the university. In 1728, the mayor of Nantes, Gérard Mellier, wrote that the Breton university would be better placed "in Rennes, a land of letters, than in Nantes, where only commerce is breathed". Consequently, the Faculty of Law of Brittany was transferred to Rennes in 1735, where the Parlement of Rennes was established by decision of King Louis XV. The faculties of literature, theology and medicine were retained in Nantes, but the faculty of medicine was in decline. There were subsequently several attempts to transfer the rest of the faculties from Nantes to Rennes, notably in 1778. However, the three faculties in Nantes were opposed to this project, pointing out the poor treatment of the Faculty of Law after its transfer to Rennes.

=== 19th century ===
In 1806, Napoleon reorganised the entire French education system by establishing the Imperial University. Rennes then became the head of an academy and as such was endowed with a faculty of law and a faculty of literature.

A short-lived faculty of letters was also created in 1810. However, it was closed by the Bourbon Restoration by a decree of 31 October 1815. The Faculty of Letters did not reopen until 1839 with the July Monarchy, and then had five chairs (French literature, Ancient literature, Foreign literature, History and Philosophy). A faculty of sciences was created one year after the faculty of letters in 1840 and also had five chairs (Mathematics, Physics, Chemistry, Zoology and Botany, Geology and Mineralogy). The medical school, created under the Empire, became a secondary school in 1820 and then a full school in 1895. These faculties remained without any institutional link between them until the creation in 1885 of a Council of Faculties. In 1896, the latter took the name of University of Rennes when the faculties were reformed following the application of the law of 10 July 1896. The university was then one of the sixteen universities in France, and the only one in the west apart from Caen and Poitiers.

=== 20th century ===
==== Expansion ====
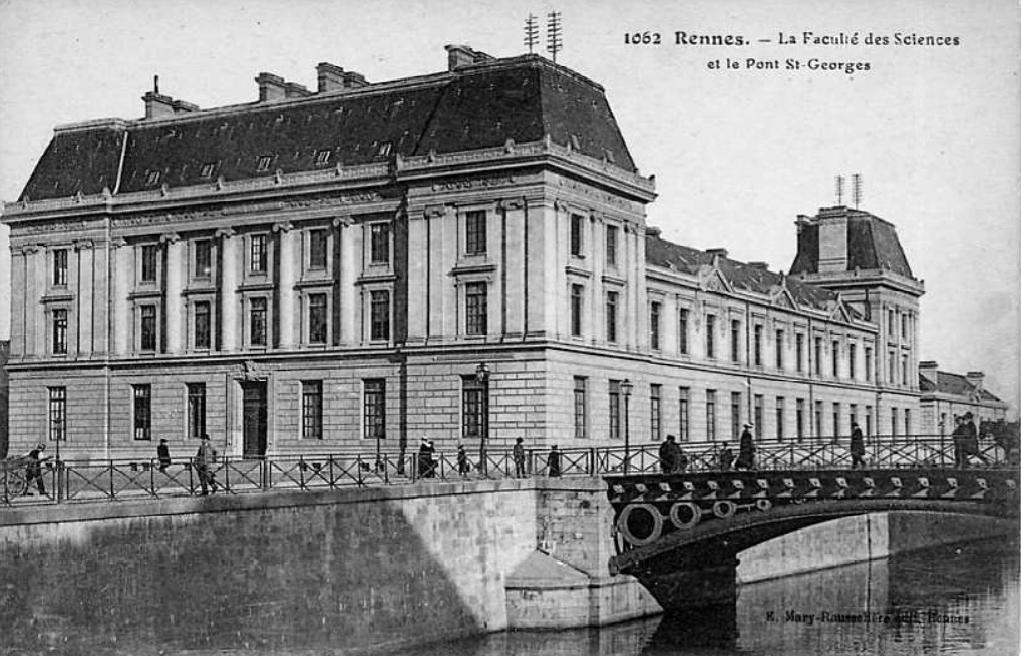
Buildings of the Faculty of Science until its move to the Beaulieu campus.

The post-war period was marked by the development of several structures within the university. In 1945, the merger of the Faculty of Sciences and the Institut polytechnique de l'Ouest (IPO) in Nantes gave rise to the Institut de chimie de l'Université de Rennes. In 1954, the Rennes School of Medicine and Pharmacy became the Faculty of Medicine and became part of the university. The following year, Jane Krier created the Institute of Business Administration of Rennes. Until 1969, the University of Rennes thus comprised four faculties: Law, Humanities, Sciences and Medicine.

The University of Rennes also developed elsewhere in Brittany, notably in Nantes, in Brest in 1959, in Quimper in 1970 and also in Angers. The decree 61-1519 of 29 December 1961 re-established a university in Nantes from the campuses of the University of Rennes, with effect from 1 January 1962. The Faculty of Letters of Nantes remained an annex of the Faculty of Letters of Rennes until 1964, and the Nantes Law Faculty was an annex of the Rennes Law Faculty until 1967.

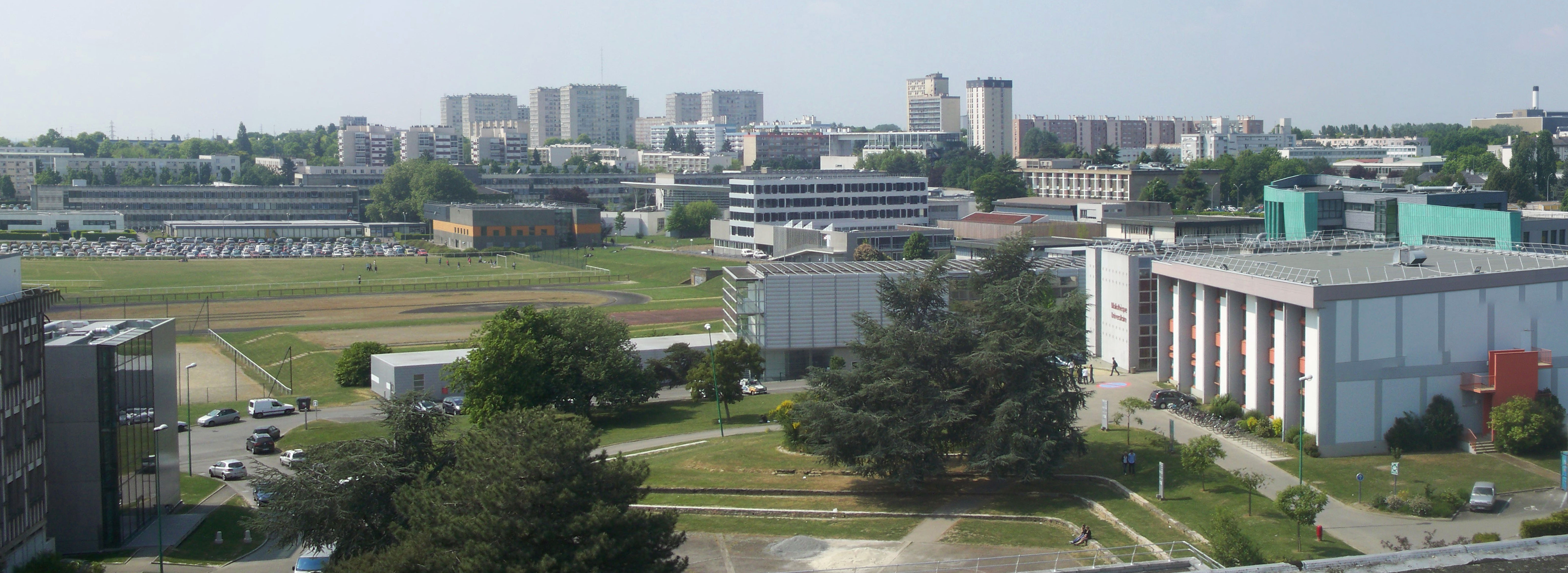
The Villejean campus of the University of Rennes in 2010.

In 1948, the population of the University of Rennes was 5,638 students; in 1949, 5,982 students; in 1958, 9,950 students. The 10,000 student mark was passed in 1959. In 1965, this number was around 19,000 students. After the Liberation, new campuses were built in Rennes, imposed by the increase in the number of students, notably the Beaulieu and Villejean campuses.

==== Split ====
The events of May 68 in France challenged the old organisation of the university in France and the faculties had to review their organisation. In Rennes, the events affected relations between the different faculties. The large number of students, as well as the refusal of some teachers and students to live together in the same institution, made it necessary to split the University of Rennes into several entities.

In 1969, it was divided into two new universities: University of Rennes 1 and University of Upper Brittany (Rennes 2). The University of Rennes 1 continued to use the name of the "University of Rennes" until 1984, when it was obliged by ministerial decision to take the name "University of Rennes 1".

=== 21st century ===
==== Refoundation ====
On 1 January 2023, the University of Rennes 1 merged with five grandes écoles—École des Hautes Etudes en Santé Publique (EHESP), École Nationale Supérieure de Chimie de Rennes, ENS Rennes, INSA Rennes and Sciences-Po Rennes—to create the new University of Rennes. The University of Rennes 2 with research institutes (CNRS, INRAE, INRIA, Inserm and CHU de Rennes) are associated with the project.

The six institutions are grouped together in an "EPE", a legal status as an 'experimental' collegiate university, weighing nearly 7,000 staff and teachers, including about 1,000 researchers, 156 research laboratories, and 60,000 of the 68,000 students in the Breton capital, including 7,000 international students.

== Organization ==
Since 2023, the University of Rennes has been made up of 6 colleges, 5 constituent Grandes Ecoles and 9 doctoral schools:

Colleges

- College of Law, Political Science, Public Administration and Philosophy
  - Faculty of Law and Political Science
  - Institut de Préparation à l'Administration Générale
  - Department of Philosophy
- College of Economics and Management
  - Faculty of Economics
  - Rennes Institute of Management (IGR - IAE Rennes)
- Health College
  - Faculty of Medicine
  - Faculty of Dentistry
  - Faculty of Pharmacy
- College of Science
  - Mathematics Department
  - Rennes Observatory of the Sciences of the Universe (Osur)
  - Department of Life and Environmental Sciences (SVE)
  - Department of Sciences and Properties of Matter (SPM)
- Technical College
  - Lannion University Technical Institute
  - Rennes University Technical Institute
  - Saint-Brieuc University Technical Institute
  - Saint-Malo University Technical Institute
- College of Engineering
  - ENSSAT - École Nationale Supérieure des Sciences Appliquées et de Technologie (internal university school)
  - ESIR - École Supérieure d'Ingénieurs de Rennes (internal university school)
  - ENSCR - École Nationale Supérieure de Chimie de Rennes (constituent school)
  - INSA Rennes - Rennes National Institute of Applied Sciences (constituent school)

Constituent schools (Grandes Écoles)

- École des Hautes Etudes en Santé Publique (EHESP)
- École Nationale Supérieure de Chimie de Rennes
- ENS Rennes
- INSA Rennes
- Sciences-Po Rennes

== See also ==
- List of early modern universities in Europe
- List of split up universities
- Kevoree
