= Yasmine Ryan =

New Zealand print, television and multimedia journalist

Yasmine Ryan (ca. 1983 – 30 November 2017) was a print, television and multimedia journalist from New Zealand. She was at the forefront in covering the Arab Spring for Al Jazeera English. Ryan also created documentaries. Ryan received several awards for her journalism, including the 2010 International Award for Excellence in Journalism.

== Biography ==
Ryan was born in France but grew up in New Zealand. She was educated at the University of Auckland (BA (Honours) in Political Science and French) and Sciences Po Aix (Master's degree in journalism). Employed as a researcher by Selwyn Manning for a book on the Ahmed Zaoui case, she ended up an author of the book. Ryan worked for Scoop, reporting on unrest in Honiara in the Solomon Islands. She also worked for Al Jazeera English (September 2010 – October 2013) in Doha, The Independent (2015), and as a contributing freelancer for TRT World. She also wrote for the Washington Post, The New York Times, Foreign Policy, Huffington Post and the Los Angeles Times. She also made documentaries for AJ+.

Ryan was credited with being the first English-speaking Western journalist to break the story of the Arab Spring uprisings, writing articles from Tunisia and Libya.

In 2016, she served as a Fellow at the World Press Institute. Shortly before her death, Ryan was elected to the board of the International Association of Women in Radio and Television (IAWRT), and had published an introduction of herself to members. She was working as Senior Features Editor at TRT World in Istanbul, but reportedly had plans to return to freelance work. Ryan died after a fall from a friend's balcony, in Istanbul, Turkey, on 30 November 2017, at the age of 34.

== Awards and honours ==
- 2010, International Award for Excellence in Journalism
- 2011, Al Jazeera English team member, winner, Columbia University Graduate School of Journalism's Alfred I duPont award
- 2011, Online News Association's Online Journalism Award in the category Breaking News, and General Excellence in Online Journalism
