= Pascal Lalle =

French police official

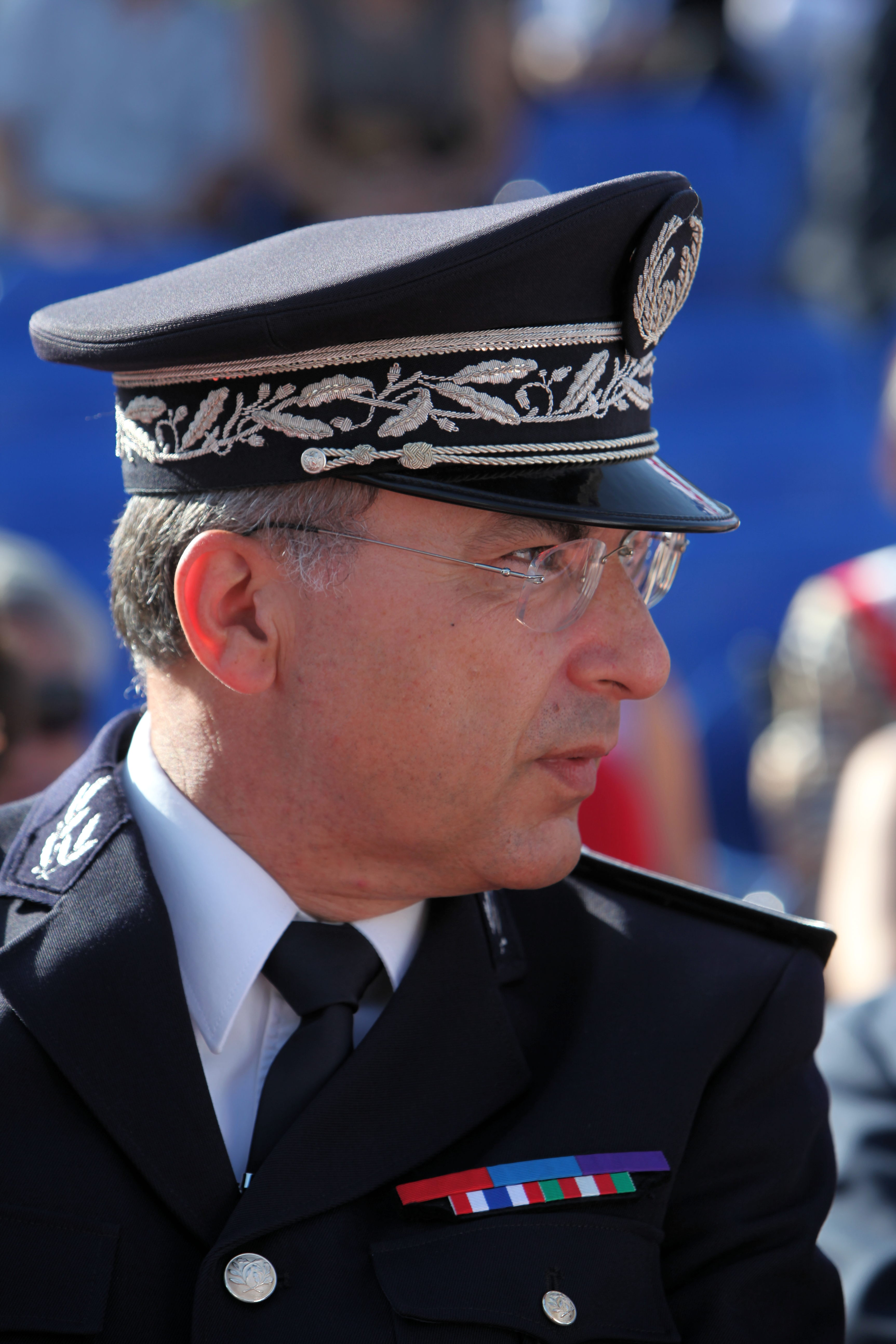
- Pascal Lalle as departmental director for public security in Bouches-du-Rhône, at the ceremonies for 14 July 2012 in Marseille.

Director of Active Services at the Central Directorate of Public Security
- Incumbent
- Assumed office 19 July 2012

Personal details
- Born: 25 October 1956 (age 69)
- Education: Sciences Po Aix École Nationale Supérieure de la Police Institut des Hautes Etudes de la Sécurité Intérieure
- Profession: Police officer
- Awards: Knight of the Legion of Honour Knight of the National Order of Merit; Knight of the Ordre des Palmes Académiques Honour medal of the National Police

Pascal Lalle (born 25 October 1956) is a French superintendent of the National Police. He has been Director of Active Services at the Central Directorate of Public Security since 19 July 2012.

== Biography ==
After completing his studies at Sciences Po Aix, Lalle attended the École Nationale Supérieure de la Police, from which he graduated in 1980.

Lalle worked in Strasbourg, Nîmes, Bobigny and Saint-Etienne, as well as in Madagascar and in Burundi. From 2008 to 2012, he was Departmental Director for Public Security in Marseille.

On 9 September 2010, while in office in Marseille, he was promoted to the rank of Inspector General for Active Services. He rose to Director of the Active Services on 19 July 2012.

== Honours ==
- Knight of the Legion of Honour
- Knight of the National Order of Merit
- Knight of the Ordre des Palmes Académiques
- Honour medal of the National Police
