= Jardin botanique de l'Université de Rennes =

French botanical garden

Coordinates: 48°07′04″N 1°38′24″W

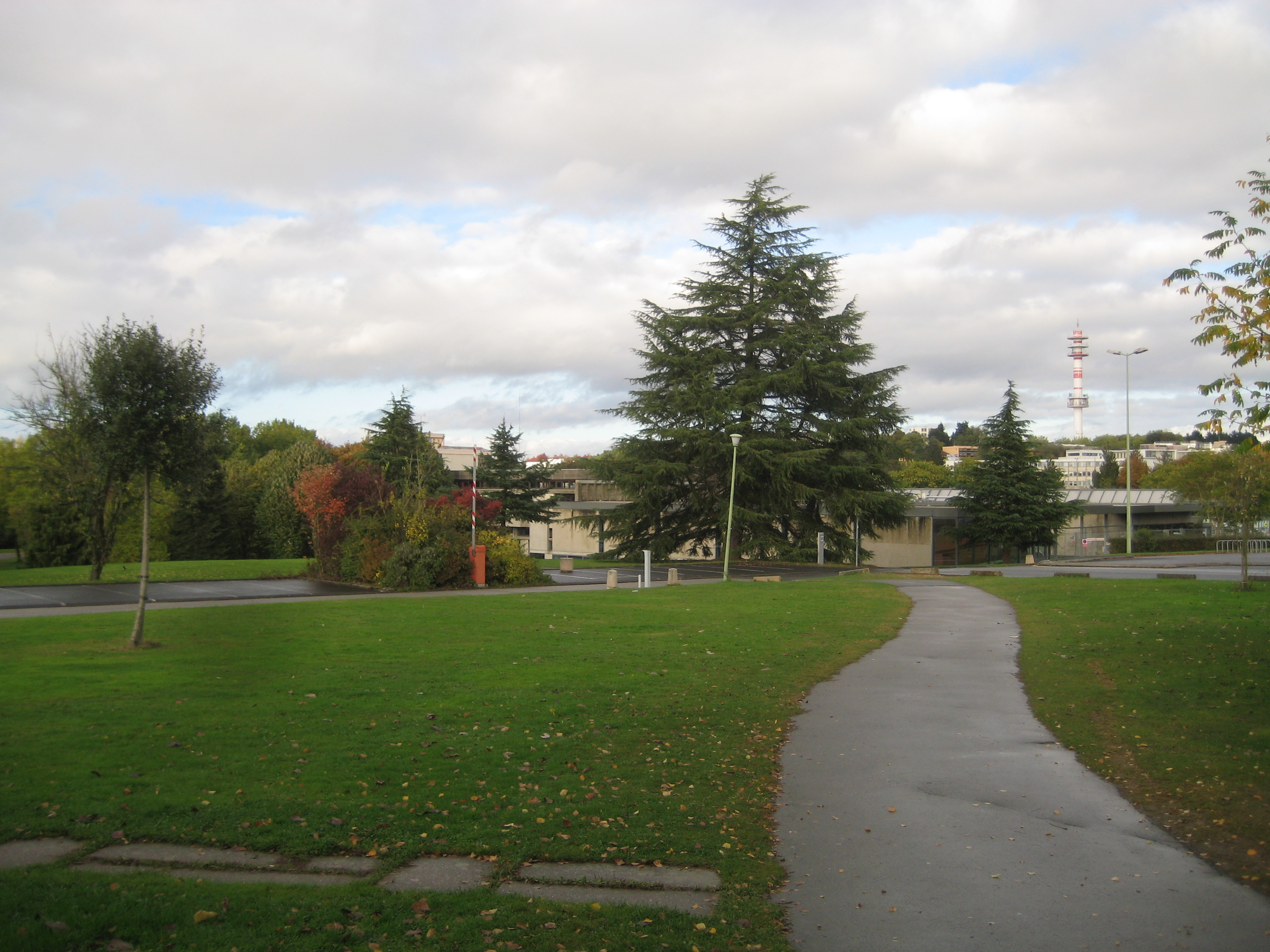
The campus in 2009

The Jardin botanique de l'Université de Rennes (Breton: Liorzh louzawouriezh Skol-veur Roazhon) is a botanical garden maintained by the Faculty of Sciences of the University of Rennes 1, Avenue du General Leclerc, Rennes, Ille-et-Vilaine, Brittany, France.

The garden consists of greenhouses, herbarium, and a collection of plant models:

- Greenhouses - located on the university's Beaulieu campus. At the start of the 20th century, they were dispersed across Rennes with a botanical greenhouse on rue De Robien and a greenhouse for experimental biology at place Pasteur. When the science faculty moved to the Beaulieu campus in the 1960s, the greenhouses were consolidated. At present, they contain three rooms (temperate, hot and arid, hot and humid) which are used primarily for teaching and genetic research.
- Herbarium - Nearly 300,000 specimens; open to researchers but not the general public.
- Wooden models of plants - from the Berlin Museum in compensation for World War II damages. Designed for botanical instruction, they are also remarkable works of art.

== See also ==
- List of botanical gardens in France
