= Collège de droit in France =

A Collège de droit ('College of law') is a selective track offered within, or alongside, an undergraduate university law degree in France. It offers additional courses, small-group instruction, and international and professional opportunities to its participants. Admissions are selective and based on various measures of academic aptitude among holders of the baccalauréat. Students from these programs are more likely to enter prestigious graduate programs or law firms later on.

== History ==
In France, universities were not allowed to select which students with a baccalauréat are admitted to their undergraduate programs, which were at most merely subject to capacity limits. In 2008 Panthéon-Assas University created a special school for selecting the most academically apt students with a baccalauréat to later admit to pre-allocated places in its undergraduate programs. Subsequently, a number of other universities adopted this model, which allows French universities to legally pre-select students and reserve places for them in later programs despite the de jure general prohibition against selection.

Media reports soon called these schools "ways of excellence" inside each university for "brilliant students" or "grandes écoles inside universities".

Collèges de droit have been criticised by some left-wing students' unions, including UNEF, which argue that universities should not allocate resources to benefit very few students, as the selective use of resources seems to be a first step towards selection in general.

== Existing Law colleges in France ==
=== Since 2008: Collège de droit and École de droit from Panthéon-Assas University ===
Panthéon-Assas University created in 2008 a special school for selecting its best students in first year in order to give them special courses and a special degree: the College of Law. In 2011, the Assas Law School was created when the first class of the College of Law had its degree. To be admitted, you have to obtain "Summa Cum Laude" in Baccalauréat and pass an entrance test. Each class is composed of around 100 students, now selected among the whole France each year.

Assas Law School (École de droit), is a school from Panthéon-Assas University delivering a graduate degree, after the College of Law (Collège de droit) delivering an undergraduate degree. The Collège de droit was the first college of law created by a French University in 2008. An additional year abroad is mandatory to obtain the Assas Law School degree.

Panthéon-Assas University being considered as the top faculty of law in France, media focused particularly on it and called even more this law college and school "way of excellence"

=== Since 2009: Grande école du droit from University of Paris-Sud ===
Created by University of Paris-Sud in 2009 is a four-year program leading to a master's degree in commercial law. It is designed to allow students to distinguish themselves in the field of law.

=== Since 2009: Collège de droit de Montpellier ===
Created by University of Montpellier in 2009, three-year degree very much focused on the classical study of law, particularly through the ancient languages. Their motto is a quote from Seneca.

=== Since 2010: Collège supérieur de droit de Toulouse ===
Created by Toulouse school of law in 2010, The Collège superieur de droit is a complementary programme offered by the Toulouse School of Law. This internal university qualification enhances the national degree pursued simultaneously by students enrolled in the third year of the Bachelor of Laws programme.

This optional supplementary programme is primarily intended for students who have achieved an overall average grade above 14/20 in the second year of their Bachelor’s degree and who wish to attain a high level of legal and general education.

The Collège supérieur de droit has developed innovative teaching methods designed to complement the traditional courses provided as part of the national degree.

The programme therefore includes seminars in general and legal culture; collective projects placing greater emphasis on independent work and self-management than on the accumulation of lectures and classroom hours; a variety of practical exercises, including short oral examinations and preparation for competitive examinations in partnership with the Institute of Judicial Studies

=== Since 2010: Collège de droit from University of La Réunion ===
Created by University of La Réunion in 2010, two-year degree which emphasizes language learning, especially English.

=== Since 2010: Collège de droit de Lyon ===
Created by Jean Moulin University Lyon 3 in 2010, three-year degree which primarily promotes contact between undergraduates for their network.

The "Association du Collège de droit de l'Université Jean Moulin Lyon III" was created in 2014 to create cohesion between the students of the Collège de droit.

=== Since 2011: Académie de droit d’Aix-Marseille ===
Created by Aix-Marseille University in 2011, it is a four-year degree, exchange experience included, where courses cover both law and political science.

=== Since 2012: Parcours d’excellence en droit of Paris Descartes University ===
Created by Paris Descartes University in 2012, two-year degree but only from the second year onwards.

=== Since 2016: Parcours d’excellence en droit of Rennes I University ===
Created by University of Rennes 1 in 2016, three-year degree.

=== Since 2017: Collège de Droit de la Sorbonne ===
Created by University of Paris 1 Pantheon-Sorbonne in 2017, three-year degree, delivers the interuniversitaire "Collège de Droit de la Sorbonne" in addition to the law undergraduate's degree.

With this diploma, Paris 1 aims to focus on a multidisciplinary approach to law, with philosophy, history, international law, sociology, finance or economy teaching, and to train lawyers able to go beyond a pure legal perspective, while deepening the learning of law.

Applicants wishing to join the diploma in first year are selected following a process based on the excellence of their academic records and an oral exam. Paris 1 claims to want "brilliant students with a high level of general knowledge and a solid capacity for work".
