= Julie Ruocco =

French writer

Julie Ruocco is a French writer.

== Biography ==
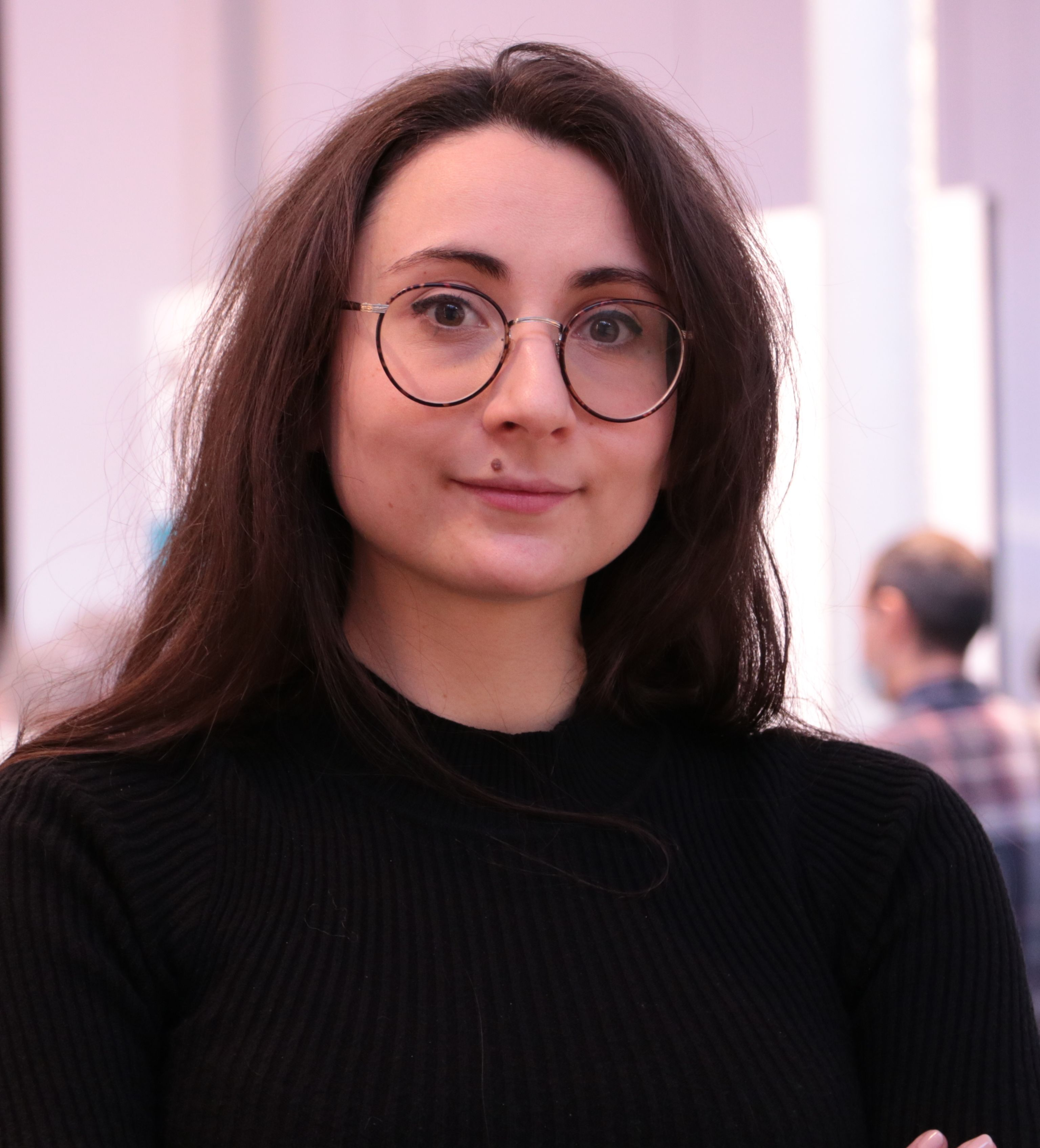
Julie Ruocco At Festival Atlantide, Nantes, 2022

Ruocco studied international relations at Sciences Po Aix before working at the European Parliament for Karima Delli. In 2016, she published a philosophical work, Et si jouer était un art ? Notre subjectivité esthétique à l'épreuve du jeu vidéo. In 2021, she published her first novel Furies noting that the COVID-19 lockdown in 2020 gave her the time to focus solely on the book. The novel, set during the Syrian Civil War is about a French archaeologist who smuggles antiquities from Syria to Europe and a Syrian firefighter turned gravedigger. Themes include the bravery of women, the effects of war and the plight of the Kurds. Furies was awarded the Prix Envoyé par La Poste and was nominated for the Prix littéraire du Monde.

== Books ==
- Et si jouer était un art ? Notre subjectivité esthétique à l'épreuve du jeu vidéo, Editions L'Harmattan, 2016, ISBN 978-2343102290
- Furies, Actes Sud, 2021, ISBN 978-2-330-15385-4
