= Madagascar Institute of Political Studies =

University in Antananarivo, Madagascar

- Institut d’Etudes Politiques de Madagascar
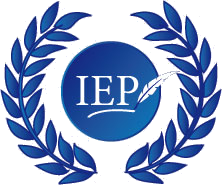
- Logo of the university
- Type: University
- Established: 2010; 16 years ago
- President: Davida Rajaon
- Vice-president: Zaka Andriamampianina
- Location: Antananarivo, Madagascar; 18°54′24″S 47°31′50″E
- Nickname: Sciences-Po, IEP
- Website: http://www.iep-madagascar.mg/

Madagascar Institute of Political Studies (French: Institut d’Etudes Politiques de Madagascar) is a department of the Reformed University of Madagascar (Université Reformée de Madagascar). It is based in Antananarivo, Madagascar. The university was opened in 2010. The president is Davida Rajaon.

The branches of the university are: Territorial Management and Development, Management of CSOs and Associations, Political Science, Marketing Communications and Journalism.
