= Sciences Po Aix =

Grande école in Aix-en-Provence, France

Coordinates: 43°31′53.87″N 5°26′48.03″E

- Institut d'Études Politiques d'Aix–en–Provence
- Motto: Dépasser les frontières, libérer les intelligences. (Pushing boundaries, freeing minds).
- Type: Institut d'études politiques (Institute of Political Studies)
- Established: 1956; 70 years ago
- Founders: Paul de Geouffre de La Pradelle
- Affiliations: Conférence des grandes écoles Aix-Marseille University; Instituts d'études politiques
- Budget: 14 million Euros
- President: Aurélie Robineau-Israël
- Director: Rostane Mehdi
- Academic staff: 280
- Students: 1,800; 15% international
- Location: Aix-en-Provence, France
- Campus: Three, all in Aix-en-Provence
- Colours: Red and Gold
- Website: www.sciencespo-aix.fr

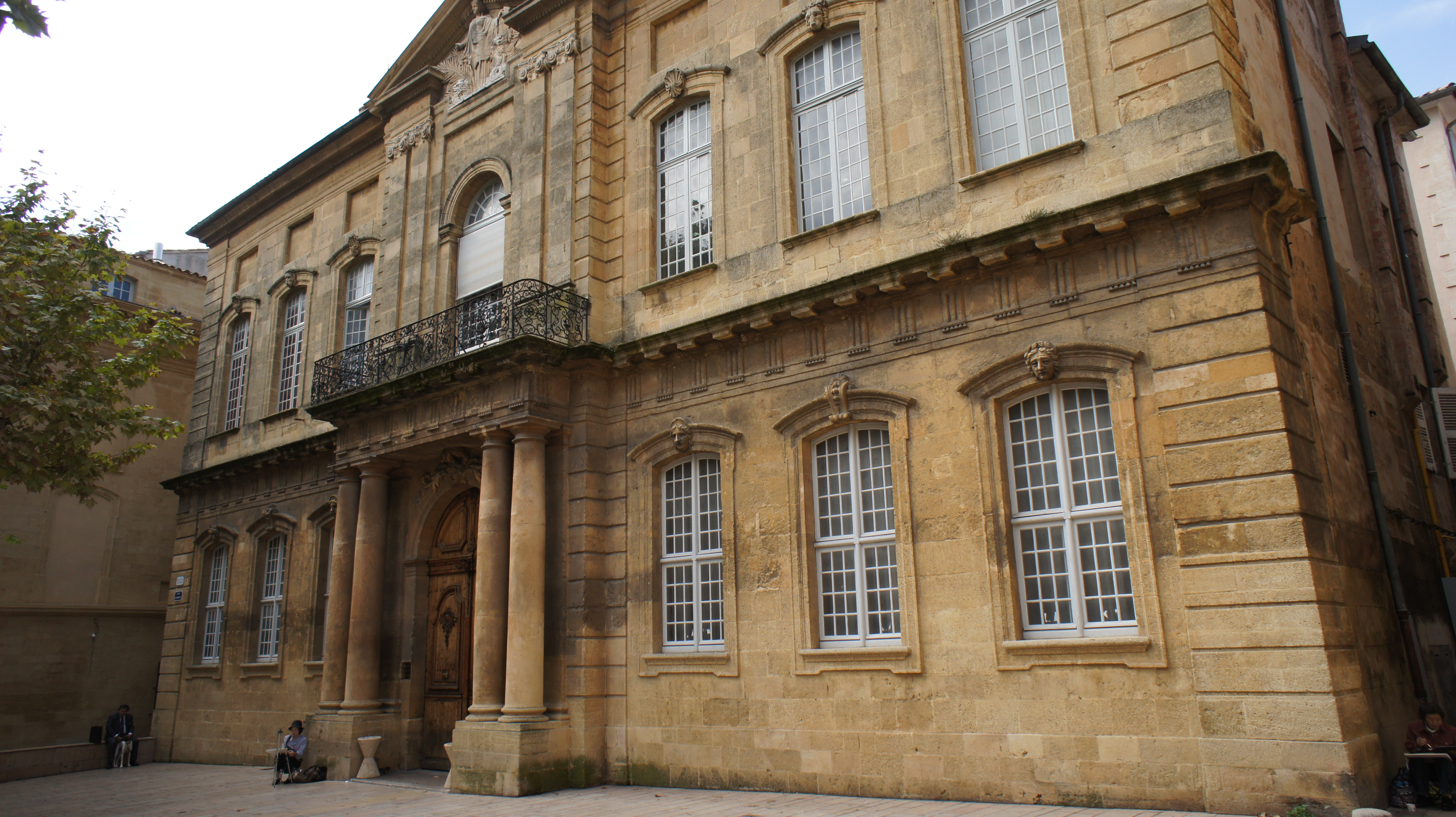
The Hôtel Maynier d’Oppède, a Monument historique designed by architect Georges Vallon in 1757, now home to Sciences Po Aix's main campus.

Sciences Po Aix, also referred to as Institut d'Études Politiques d'Aix-en-Provence, is a Grande École of political studies located in Aix-en-Provence, in the Provence region of southern France. It is placed under the administration of Aix-Marseille University and is part of a network of ten Institut d'études politiques, also known as IEPs.

Sciences Po Aix, like other IEPs, is nationally renowned for its excellence in public administration, political science, and law. However, it distinguishes itself with a strong focus on defense, international relations, geopolitics, and international security—fields in which it has developed specialized programs that are recognized as being among the best in Europe.

Sciences Po Aix also offers a Franco-German program in partnership with the Albert-Ludwigs-Universität Freiburg as part of the Franco-German University, allowing students to obtain a double degree.

== History ==
Sciences Po Aix was established in 1956 by jurist and law professor Paul de Geouffre de La Pradelle. The school is the direct heir of the École Libre des Sciences Politiques, created by Émile Boutmy in 1872 in response to a need for political stability following the fall of the Second Empire and the birth of the new French Third Republic in 1870.

In September 2007, Philippe Séguin (1943–2010), then President of the Court of Audit (in French Cour des comptes), was elected President of the Administration Council, succeeding Jean-Paul Proust (1940–2010), Minister of the Principality of Monaco. In July 2010, the then French Minister of Economics, who went on to become the International Monetary Fund's director and the current president of the European Central Bank, Christine Lagarde, was elected President of the Administration Council of the school, from which she had graduated in 1977 and had been a board member since 2008.

== Location ==
Sciences Po Aix's main campus is housed in a hôtel particulier, known as the Hôtel Maynier d’Oppède. Designed by architect Georges Vallon in 1757, the edifice has been classified as a historical building (French : monument historique) since 1929. The building is located opposite the Cathédrale Saint-Sauveur, at the 25 rue Gaston de Saporta, in the very heart of Aix-en-Provence.

The building previously housed the Faculty of Law of Aix-Marseille University where personalities like Portalis, Adolphe Tiers and painter Paul Cézanne have studied.

In Septembre 2009, Sciences Po Aix established a new campus in a former hospice which belonged to the religious congregation of the Petites Sœurs des pauvres. In May 2016, after extensive renovations, the campus reopened and was named after the former French politician, president of the National Assembly and former student, Philippe Séguin. This space serves as a research center, as well as a venue for major events organized by the schoom, including lectures, conferences, and cultural gatherings. It is also used for student exhibitions and faculty meetings, making it a focal point of the institution’s academic life.

== Overview ==
Sciences Po institutes are Grandes Écoles, French institutions of higher education that are separate from, but parallel and connected to the main framework of the French public university system. Similar to the Ivy League in the United States, Oxbridge in the UK, or the C9 League in China, Grandes Écoles are elite academic institutions that admit students through an extremely selective process. The admittance rates within these schools are often under 10%. Former students frequently go on to occupy high positions within the government, public administration, and corporate firms in France and throughout Europe.

Although these institutes are more expensive than public universities in France, Grandes Écoles typically have much smaller class sizes and student bodies, and many of their programs are taught in English. International internships, study abroad opportunities, and close ties with government and the corporate world are a hallmark of the Grandes Écoles. Many of the top ranked schools in Europe are members of the Conférence des Grandes Écoles (CGE), as are the Sciences Po institutions. Degrees from Sciences Po are accredited by the Conférence des Grandes Écoles and awarded by the Ministry of Higher Education and Research (French: Ministère de l’Enseignement supérieur et de la Recherche).

The institute is modeled on the former École Libre des Sciences Politiques, and as such, Sciences Po specializes in political science, but uses an interdisciplinary approach to education that provides student generalists with the high level of grounding in skills that they need in History, Law, Economic Sciences, Sociology, Political science and International relations, enriched by specialization in years 4 and 5, after a 3rd year either on a professional placement in France or overseas or alternatively studying at a foreign university. The third year of the curriculum is a year of mobility abroad, and students have the choice, they can spend two semesters in a foreign university, one semester in a university and one semester internship or they also have the opportunity to spend two semesters as a trainee. The academic course lasts five years, and it is a three-year undergraduate programme and a two-year graduate programme and the primary diploma is a master's degree.

Sciences Po Aix has concluded 142 exchange partnerships with different universities in over 40 countries around the world. This enables students to study in a foreign country during their third year; which is mandatory. All continents of the world are represented on the partnership list, there are partnerships in the United States (Wellesley College, Loyola University Chicago, Arizona State University, Florida International University...), in Canada (University of Montreal, University of Ottawa) in South America (University of Buenos Aires, Federal University of Rio de Janeiro, in Africa (Rhodes University), in Asia (Shanghai International Studies University, Hankuk University of Foreign Studies in Seoul, Waseda University in Tokyo), in Oceania (University of New South Wales in Sydney, University of Canterbury in New Zealand) and also in Europe (Free University of Berlin, LUISS University in Roma, Middlesex University in London).

== Directors ==
- 1956-1974 : Paul de Geouffre de la Pradelle
- 1974-1979 : Charles Cadoux
- 1979-1984 : Yves Daudet
- 1984-1996 : Jacques Bourdon
- 1996-2006 : Jean-Claude Ricci
- 2006-2014 : Christian Duval
- 2015-2025 : Rostane Mehdi

Directors of the institute are elected for a five-year term by the executive board of the school. Some members of this board are elected such as students, teachers, and staff representatives, others are appointed by the regional academy. The executive board votes about the pedagogical and administrative orientation they wish the school to take, but also on the reforms presented by the director, the budget of the school and the conventions signed with foreign universities.

== Notable alumni ==
Many prominent politicians have been students at Sciences Po Aix:

- Jeremy Stine, American politician, current member of the Louisiana State Senate
- Christine Lagarde, former managing director of the International Monetary Fund and current President of the European Central Bank
- Philippe Séguin, French politician, former President of the National Assembly and President of the Cour des Comptes
- Élisabeth Guigou, French politician, former Minister of European Affairs (1990 - 1993), of Justice (1997 - 2000) and of Social Affairs (2000-2002)
- Roger Karoutchi, French politician
- Federica Mogherini, current High representative of the Union for Foreign Affairs and Security Policy whilst enrolled at University of Rome La Sapienza, spent a year at the institute as an Erasmus student
- Chandrika Kumaratunga, former president of Sri Lanka
- Brune Poirson, Secretary of State to the Ministry of Ecology
- Patrick Mennucci, former member of the National Assembly
- Patrick Ollier, former President of the National Assembly and Minister

In addition to its political figures, Sciences Po Aix has alumni who have held significant roles in culture, state administration, as well as the business world, showcasing the wide-reaching impact of its education:

- Bruno Étienne, anthropologist and sociologist, former professor at Sciences Po Aix
- José Frèches, French writer, former advisor of Jacques Chirac when he occupied the position of Prime Minister
- Jean-Pierre Bernès, French sport agent
- Raphaël Liogier, French sociologist and philosopher, professor at Sciences Po Aix
- Pascal Lalle
- Fanny Ardant, French actress, winner of the César Award for Best Actress in 1997 for her performance in Pédale douce
- Yasmine Ryan (ca. 1983 – 2017), New Zealand journalist
- Efemia Chela, writer
- Julie Ruocco, writer
- Rémy Weber, former CEO of La Banque Postale (2013-2020)
