= EHESP =

University in Rennes and Paris

Coordinates: 48°06′58″N 1°42′09″W

École des hautes études en santé publique
- EHESP French School of Public Health
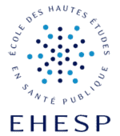
- Former names: École nationale de la santé publique (ENSP)
- Established: 1945
- Affiliations: Sorbonne Paris Cité
- Dean: Laurent Chambaud
- Students: 1,300
- Location: Rennes and Paris, Brittany and Île-de-France, France
- Website: EHESP.fr

École des hautes études en santé publique (English: EHESP French School of Public Health), with a campus in both Rennes and Paris is designed to form the next generation of French and international professionals in public health. It is a 'grande ecole.' EHESP employs 90 full-time professors and has a student population of 1300 (excluding the 7000 training participants).

== History ==
The École des Hautes Études en Santé Publique (EHESP French School of Public Health) was signed into being January 1, 2008, changing its name from the ENSP (École Nationale de la Santé Publique).

The French government set up the school in 1945 as a means of developing a management personnel in the public sector who were able to apply the major social security laws passed in 1945 and construct the new health and welfare administrative infrastructure after the Liberation.

The ENSP was responsible for the professional development of medical and paramedical public health workers as well as health technicians. Post War legislation, political and economic changes and international collaboration very soon called for a wider range of specialised training courses for public health management personnel.

1960 marked the independence of ENSP, allowing it to hire permanent teaching personnel. The campus moved from Paris to Rennes in 1961. In 2008, the increasing complexity and interdisciplinary nature of public health fostered the change in mission from isolated vocational departments to international, interdisciplinary education. The 2004 public health law further emphasized the international aim of post-graduate public health education in France. Although already internationally recognized for its work with the World Health Organization, EHESP further gained an international image through its various International Programs taught in both French and English. The ENSP became the École des Hautes Études en Santé Publique (EHESP) on January 1, 2008.

On February 9, 2010, it joined 4 universities and other higher educational establishments to form Université Sorbonne Paris Cité. Université Sorbonne Paris Cité is composed of Paris-3 Sorbonne Nouvelle, Paris-5 Descartes, Paris-7 Diderot and Paris-13 Nord Villetaneuse (Seine-Saint-Denis) as associate members. 4 grand establishments, EHESP French School of public health, Sciences-Po Paris, l’Institut national des langues et civilisations orientales (Inalco, National Institute of languages and oriental civilizations), l’Institut de physique du globe de Paris (Physics Institute of Paris).

In 2015 a second site was opened in Paris.

== List of deans ==
1. 1(1945–1960) Professor Daniel Santenay
2. 2(1962–1965) Professor Jean Senecal
3. 3(1965–1975) Dr. John Simon Cayla
4. 4(1975–1979) Pierre Leclerc
5. 5(1979–1982) Louis Picard
6. 6(1982–1986) Dr. Jean-Paul Picard
7. 7(1986–1993) Christian Rollet
8. 8(1993–1998) Emmanuele Mengual
9. 9(1998–2003) Dr. Pascal Chevit
10. 10(2003–2006) Professor Jacques Hardy
11. 11(2007–2008) Professor Dominique Bertrand
12. 12(2008–2013) Antoine Flahault
13. 13(2013–present) Dr. Laurent Chambaud

== English-taught programs ==
MPH (Master of Public Health) is a two year program that takes place in Rennes.

== Accreditation ==
EHESP is accredited by the French Ministry of Education and uses the ECTS European grading system.
