= Sciences Po Rennes =

Political science university in Rennes, France

- Institut d'études politiques de Rennes
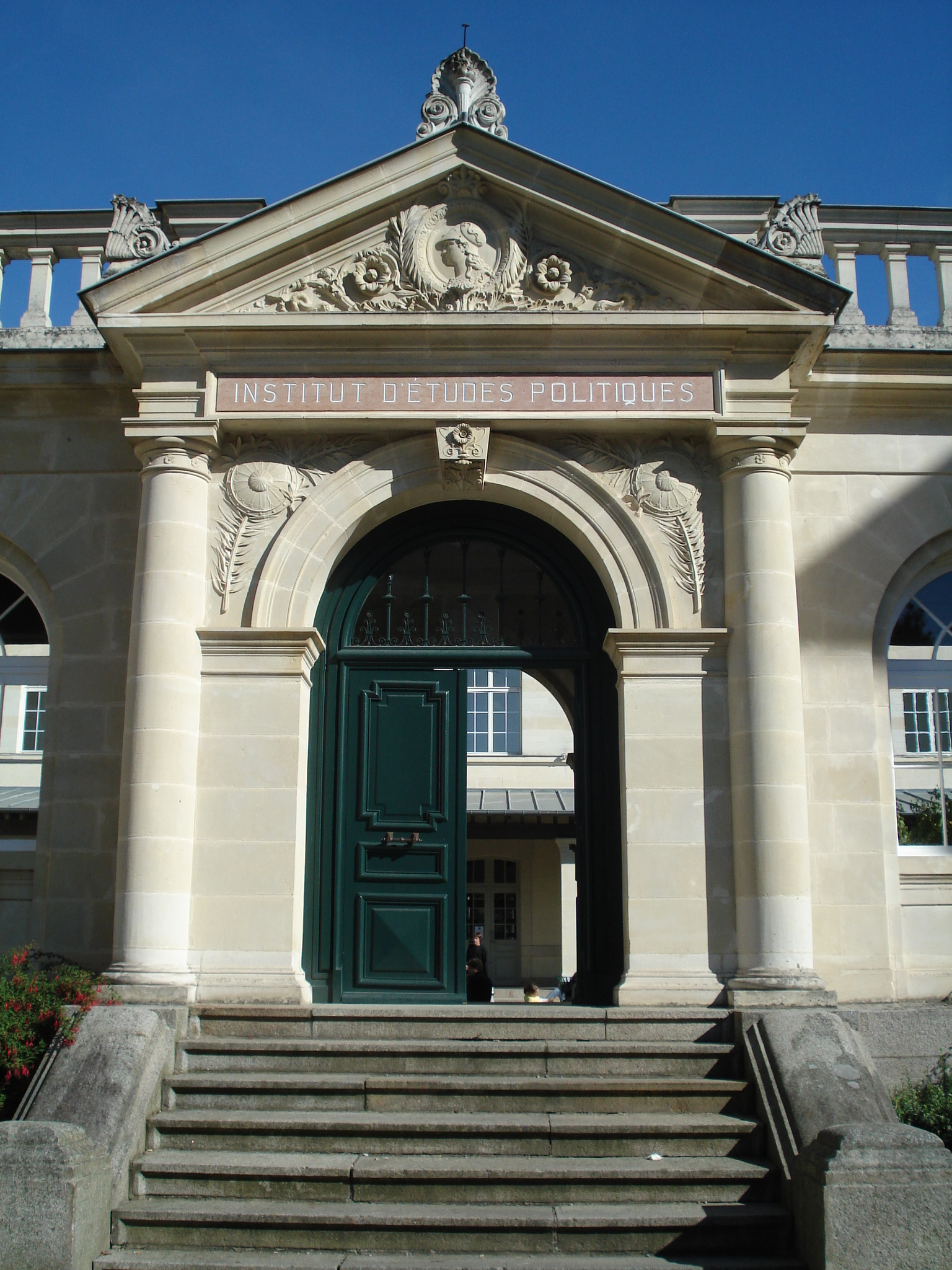
- Type: Grande école Institut d'études politiques (public research university Political Science school)
- Established: 1991; 35 years ago
- Affiliations: Conférence des grandes écoles Instituts d'études politiques European University of Brittany
- Director: Pablo DIAZ
- Location: Rennes, France; 48°07′17″N 1°40′06″W
- Language: English-only & French-only instruction
- Website: www.sciencespo-rennes.fr

- France Rennes

The Institut d'Etudes Politiques de Rennes (French pronunciation: [ɛ̃stity dətyd pɔlitik də ʁɛn], Rennes Institute of Political Studies) also known as Sciences Po Rennes ([sjɑ̃s po ʁɛn]), is a French university established in 1991 in Rennes, the regional capital of Brittany. The institution is one of the ten official Instituts d'études politiques in France and is considered to be a grande école.

== History ==
Sciences Po Rennes was created by government decree on 13 June 1991, alongside Sciences Po Lille. The establishment of the two institutions was supported by French academics René Rémond and Alain Lancelot, as well as by the Fondation nationale des Sciences Politiques. The institution is legally tied to the University of Rennes.

== Academics ==
Sciences Po institutes are Grandes Écoles, a French institution of higher education that is separate from, but parallel and connected to the main framework of the French public university system. Similar to the Ivy League in the United States, Oxbridge in the UK, and C9 League in China, Grandes Écoles are elite academic institutions that admit students through an extremely competitive process. The selection rates at these schools are frequently less than 10%. Alums go on to occupy elite positions within government, administration, and corporate firms in France.

Although these institutes are more expensive than public universities in France, Grandes Écoles typically have much smaller class sizes and student bodies, and many of their programs are taught in English. International internships, study abroad opportunities, and close ties with government and the corporate world are a hallmark of the Grandes Écoles. Many of the top ranked schools in Europe are members of the Conférence des Grandes Écoles (CGE), as are the Sciences Po institutes.

The institute is modeled on the former École Libre des Sciences Politiques, and as such, Sciences Po specializes in political science, but uses an interdisciplinary approach to education that provides student generalists with the high level of grounding in skills that they need in History, Law, Economic Sciences, Sociology, Political science and International relations. Students are taught at least two foreign languages and must spend one year abroad in order to achieve proficiency in their second language. The academic course lasts five years, and it is a three-year undergraduate programme and a two-year graduate programme and the primary diploma is a master's degree. The third year of the curriculum is a year of mobility abroad, and students can spend two semesters in a foreign university, one semester in a university and one semester internship or they also have the opportunity to spend two semesters as a trainee. Years 4 and 5 are for specialization. Degrees from Sciences Po are accredited by the Conférence des Grandes Écoles and awarded by the Ministry of National Education (France) (French: Le Ministère de L'éducation Nationale).

== Degree ==
Sciences Po Rennes currently offers a 5-year programme composed of a three-year-long undergraduate programme and a two-year graduate programme in compliance with the Bologna Process. The primary diploma is equivalent to a master's degree. Sciences Po Rennes has more than 100 exchange-agreements with universities throughout the world including partnerships with Queen Mary University of London, Free University of Berlin or Boston University. Student selection is based on a competitive written examination at the end of secondary school (acceptance/selection rate is currently around 8-10%).
