= Embassy of France, Ottawa =

Diplomatic mission of France in Canada

Coordinates: 45.443356°N 75.694481°W

Embassy of France in Ottawa
- Logo of the French embassy
- Location: New Edinburgh, Ottawa, Ontario, Canada
- Address: 42 Sussex Drive
- Ambassador: Michel Miraillet

The Embassy of France in Canada (French: Ambassade de France au Canada) in Ottawa is the diplomatic mission of France to Canada, located at 42 Sussex Drive in the New Edinburgh neighbourhood of Ottawa.

== History ==
The French diplomatic mission in Canada was founded in 1928 and was originally based in the Victoria Building with the first representative being Jean Knight. Knight began looking for a suitable location to house the mission and settled on the area bordering the Ottawa River near Rockcliffe Park. Unfortunately there were no buildings in the area for sale. In 1930, Knight proposed the purchase of the Blackburn property, located at 62 Sussex Drive. The property was a prized piece of land overlooking the Rideau Falls that was not far from the residence of the Governor General and, at the time, connected to the city centre by a tram. After lengthy negotiations with the owner, the property was purchased from Arthur Blackburn on 31 December 1931. The legation was then based in the Blackburn mansion.

Construction on the new mission building began on the property in 1936 with the first stone being laid by Prime Minister William Lyon Mackenzie King on Bastille Day. In January 1938, while construction was in process, France purchased the next door Lemay property, sensibly enlarging the property. At the same time, France acquired, for one symbolic dollar, a narrow strip of land along the Ottawa River, belonging to the Ontario provincial government. The Ottawa River thus became the limits of the property. Both the Blackburn and Lemay houses were demolished during construction. On 4 January 1939, the mission was opened in the presence of seven hundred people, including the Governor General of Canada Lord Tweedsmuir and Prime Minister Mackenzie King.

The French envoy René Ristelhueber, appointed in early 1940, acknowledged the Vichy regime as did the Canadian government. In 1942, Canada switched and expelled the Vichy diplomats and the facilities were turned over to the Free French Forces and Colonel Philippe Pierrené was recognized as the French envoy. The French upgraded the mission to a full embassy following World War II.

== Building ==
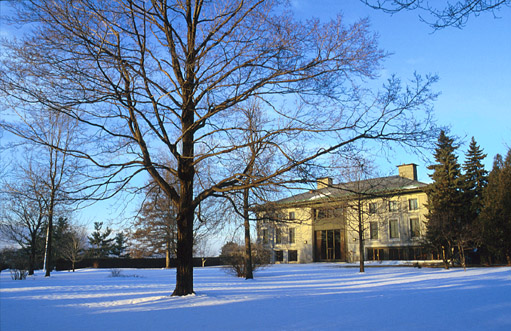
The French Embassy serves as both chancery and ambassadorial residence

Inaugurated in 1939, this diplomatic mission was designed by French architect Eugène Beaudouin in the Art Deco style. Housing both the residence of the ambassador and embassy services, the building of grey granite is three stories and is organized around the Great Hall. The main room features furniture and decorations also in an Art Deco style, including Marcel Gromaire tapestries representing the four seasons: the Canadian winter, the Parisian spring, summer in Saint-Malo and fall in Quebec. A massive pink marble staircase provides access to the second story and leads to the gallery overlooking the Great Hall and reception rooms.

The rooms display decorations that highlight the ties of friendship which exists between the France and Canada, like the bas-relief of the gallery that represents the Canadian National Vimy Memorial in honour of Canadian soldiers during the First World War and the office walls ambassadors engraved by Charles-Émile Pinson on the subject of the discovery of Canada by the Vikings. The materials that were used to build the embassy come from both Canada (wooden doors and door frames, and the grey granite from Quebec for exterior walls) and France (Saint-Quentin travertine for walls of the hall, and the pink marble from Burgundy for the staircase).

The dining room is decorated with a 120 square metre mural named La France, by painter Alfred Courmes. The decoration of the bronze doors of the living room was done by Robert Cami. The embassy is also decorated with sculptures by Leygue Louis and Jean Prouvé.

== French Ambassador to Canada ==
From	To	Ambassador
Envoy Extraordinary and Minister Plenipotentiary
1928	1930	Jean Knight
1930	1932	Charles-Arsène Henry
1934	1937	Raymond Brugère
1937	1940	Robert de Dampierre
1940	1942	René Ristelhueber
Delegate of Free French Forces
1942	1943	Colonel Philippe Pierrenne
1943	1945	Gabriel Bonneau
Ambassador of France to Canada
1945	1948	Jean de Hauteclocque
1948	1949	Francisque Gay
1949	1955	Hubert Guérin
1955	1962	Francis Lacoste
1962	1965	Raymond Bousquet
1965	1968	François Leduc
1968	1972	Pierre Siraud
1972	1977	Jacques Viot
1977	1979	Xavier Daufresne de la Chevalerie
1979	1981	Pierre Maillard
1981	1984	Jean Beliard
1984	1987	Jean-Pierre Cabouat
1987	1989	Philippe Husson
1989	1991	François Bujon de l'Estang
1992	1997	Alfred Siefer-Gaillardin
1997	1998	Loïc Hennekinne
1998	2001	Denis Bauchard
2001	2004	Philippe Guelluy
2004	2008	Daniel Jouanneau
2008	2011	François Delattre
2011	2015	Philippe Zeller
2015	2017	Nicolas Chapuis
2017	2022	Kareen Rispal
2022	present	Michel Miraillet

== Consulates ==
France has 5 consulates general in Canada, each one assisted by honorary consuls. The consulates are:

- Consulate General in Moncton (New Brunswick)
  - Honorary consul in Halifax (Nova Scotia)
  - Honorary consul in Saint John (New Brunswick)
  - Honorary consul in St. John's (Newfoundland and Labrador)
- Consulate General in Montreal (Quebec)
  - Honorary consul in Rouyn-Noranda (Abitibi-Témiscamingue)
  - Honorary consul in Sherbrooke (Estrie)
- Consulate General in Quebec City (Quebec)
  - Honorary consul in Chicoutimi (Saguenay–Lac-Saint-Jean)
  - Honorary consul in Chandler (Gaspésie)
- Consulate General in Toronto (Ontario)
  - Honorary consul in Sudbury (Northern Ontario), (Jean-Charles Cachon, 2002-)
  - Honorary consul in Winnipeg (Manitoba), (Bruno Burnichon 2010-2018; Jean-Eric Ghia 2018-)
- Consulate General in Vancouver (British Columbia)
  - Honorary consul in Calgary (Alberta)
  - Honorary consul in Edmonton (Alberta)
  - Honorary consul in Saskatoon (Saskatchewan)
  - Honorary consul in Victoria (British Columbia)
  - Honorary consul in Whitehorse (Yukon)

== French Nationals in Canada ==
There are an estimated 150,000 French expatriates in Canada, 60% of whom have settled in the Montreal area. As of August 31, 2022, the 110,002 registered French citizens were spread out among the 5 consular districts as follows: Montreal: 65,231 • Quebec City: 17,500 • Toronto: 14,715 • Vancouver: 11,438 • Moncton-Halifax: 1,118.

== See also ==
- Canada–France relations
- List of diplomatic missions of France
