= Michel Miraillet =

French diplomat and Ambassador to Canada

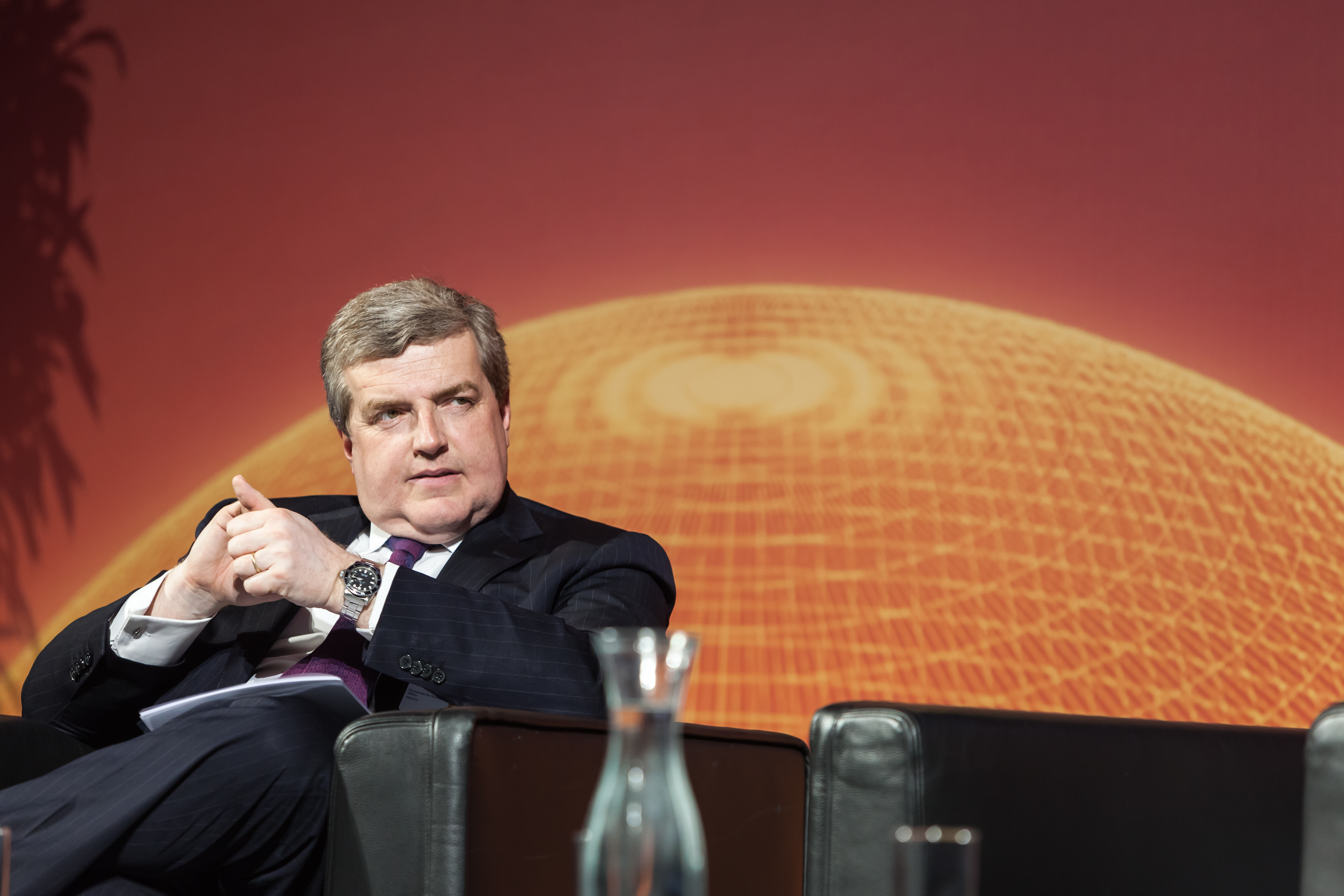

Ambassador of France to Canada
- Incumbent
- Assumed office 22 September 2022
- President: Emmanuel Macron
- Preceded by: Kareen Rispal

Director General for Global Affairs
- In office March 2020 – September 2022

Ambassador of France to Brazil
- In office September 2017 – 2020
- Preceded by: Laurent Bili
- Succeeded by: Brigitte Collet

Ambassador of France to the United Arab Emirates
- In office 2013–2017
- Preceded by: Alain Azouaou
- Succeeded by: Ludovic Pouille

Personal details
- Born: April 10, 1960 (age 66) Paris, France
- Education: École nationale d'administration Sciences Po; Paris Dauphine University
- Occupation: Diplomat

Michel Miraillet (born 10 April 1960) is a French diplomat who became the Ambassador of France to Canada in September 2022. He was previously the French Ambassador to Brazil and to the United Arab Emirates.

== Education ==
Miraillet is a graduate of the École nationale d'administration (ENA), Montaigne class (1986–1988). He also studied at Sciences Po and Paris Dauphine University, where he earned a postgraduate degree (DESS) in management control.

== Career ==
Michel Miraillet joined the French Ministry of Foreign Affairs in 1988, initially working on Middle Eastern affairs and arms control. From 1992 to 1995, he served as counsellor at France’s Permanent Mission to the United Nations in New York, focusing on disarmament and international security.

He later held diplomatic posts in Cairo and at France’s delegation to NATO, followed by service as First Counsellor at the French Embassy in Israel. Between 2007 and 2013, Miraillet worked at the French Ministry of Defence, where he served as Director for Strategic Affairs and contributed to the French White Papers on Defence and National Security.

In 2013, he was appointed Ambassador of France to the United Arab Emirates, followed by his appointment as Ambassador to Brazil in 2017. In March 2020, he returned to Paris as Director General for Global Affairs, Culture, Education, and International Development, also serving as France’s G7/G20 “sous-sherpa”.

On 13 September 2022, Miraillet was appointed Ambassador of France to Canada and presented his credentials to Governor General Mary Simon on 22 September 2022.

== Honours ==
- (France) Knight of the Legion of Honour
- (France) Knight of the National Order of Merit
