= Edmond Genet =

American flier, first official American casualty of World War I

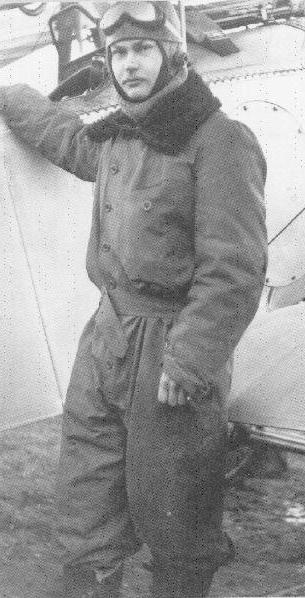
- Genet while he was flying for the Lafayette Escadrille in France during the First World War
- Born: November 9, 1896; Ossining, New York, U.S.
- Died: April 17, 1917 (aged 20) near Saint-Quentin, France
- Military career
- Allegiance: United States (1914-17); France (1915-17)
- Service: United States Navy; French Foreign Legion
- Service years: 1914-17
- Rank: Ordinary seaman (U.S.); Sergeant (France)
- Units: French Foreign Legion; Lafayette Escadrille
- Conflicts: World War I †: Second Battle of Champagne; Battle of Verdun

Edmond Charles Clinton Genet (November 9, 1896 – April 17, 1917) was the first American flier to die in the First World War after the United States declared war against Germany, shot down by anti-aircraft artillery on April 17, 1917.

Genet had deserted from the US Navy in 1915 to travel to France and fought for over a year with the French Foreign Legion in the trenches of eastern France. After six months of training, he joined the Lafayette Escadrille, a squadron of fighter aircraft that mostly consisted of Americans. Genet was killed less than four months later.

== Early life ==
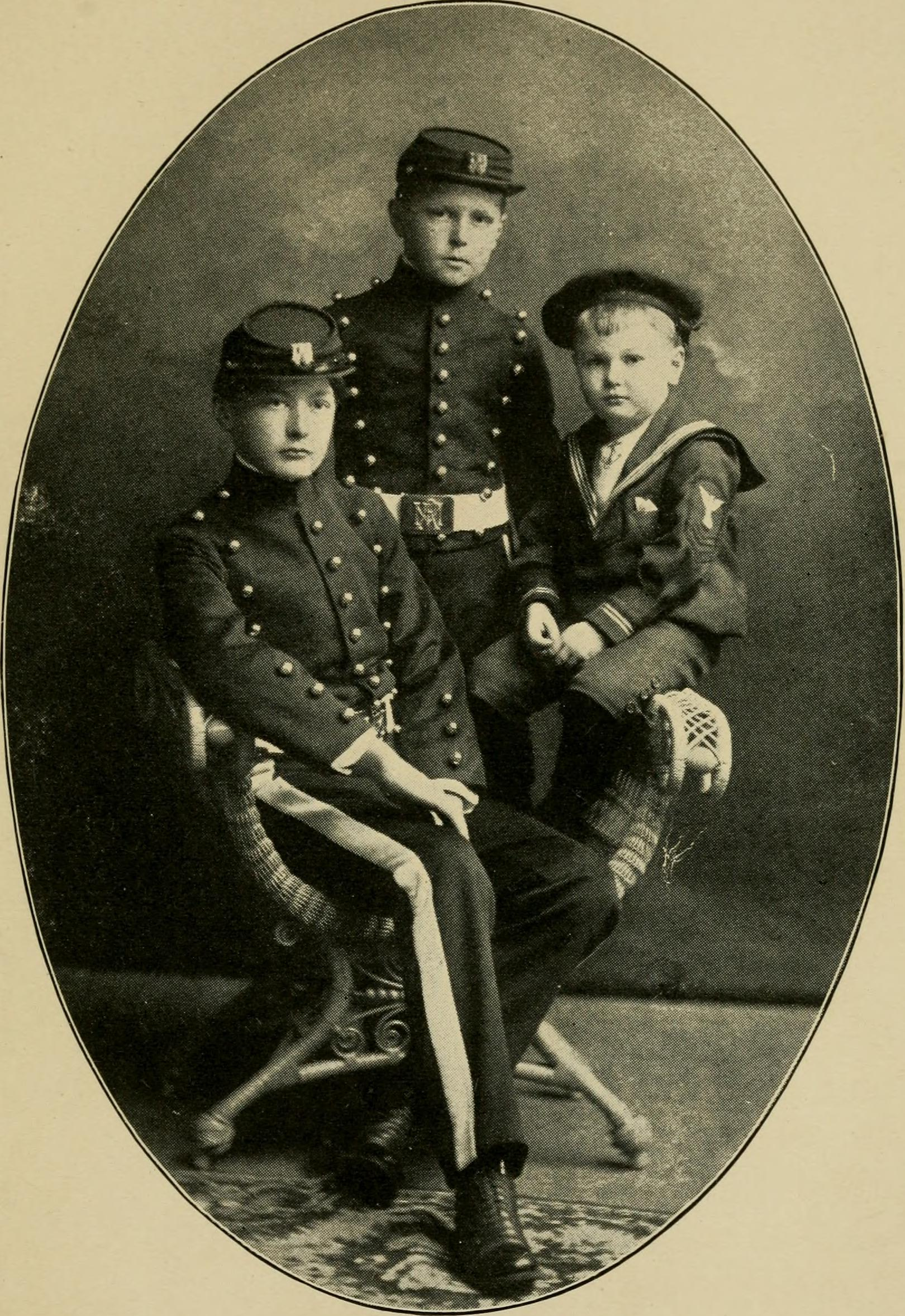
Edmond Genet (right) with his brothers Gilbert Rodman Fox Genet (born 1889) (left) and Albert Rivers Genet Jr. (born in 1887) (centre).

Genet was born in Ossining, New York, on November 9, 1896, to Albert Rivers Genet and Martha Rodman Fox. He was the youngest of three sons and his two brothers served in the military during the First World War. His father was a lawyer and his mother was involved in several organizations including the Daughters of the American Revolution. Genet was the second great-grandson of Edmond-Charles Genêt, the controversial French Ambassador to the United States in 1793. He was educated at Mt. Pleasant Military Academy. When his father died in 1912, he took on several jobs to help his mother with bills, including one at a dairy owned by V. Everit Macy, a government official for the county.

== US Navy ==
Genet interviewed to be accepted as a cadet at the US Naval Academy but failed mathematics and was rejected. Genet was encouraged to join the US Navy as it was thought that he would be promoted quickly. Genet joined the US naval militia as an ordinary seaman in 1914 at just 17. Genet was posted to USS Georgia, which was sent to the port city of Veracruz as a result of the Tampico Affair. After three months, Georgia left Veracruz and sailed to Port au Prince, Haiti, where Genet heard that war had broken out in Europe. In late December, Genet was given leave of ten days but failed to return as he decided that he would go to France to fight against the Central Powers. He was able to get a visa by giving his age as twenty-one to the French visa official. He was able to secure a passport by lying and saying he was only going to France to inquire about his family's estate. Genet kept quiet until he was able to secure the necessary documents but before leaving on SS Rochambeau, Genet wrote letters to several of his friends and family that he did not expect to survive this conflict. On January 14, 1915, he wrote to his mother:

I never expect to come back—death seems nearer to me than any possible chances of going through the horrible ghastly conflict which is carousing over Europe without meeting death. I do not fear when I think of it, Mother. I can give my life just as freely for the Tricolor as I can for Old Glory.

— January 14, 1915.

== World War 1 ==
=== French Foreign Legion ===
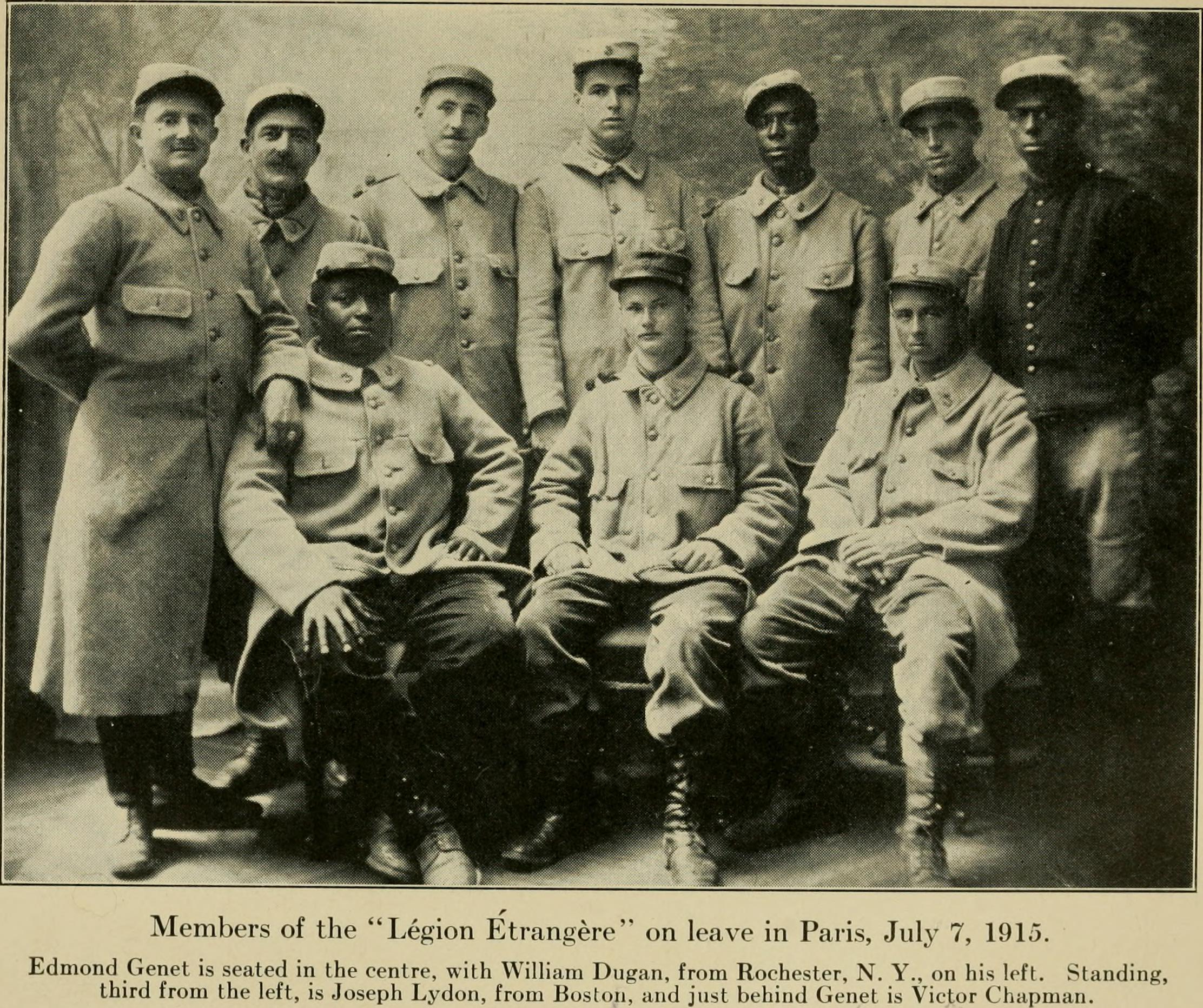
Members of the legion on leave in Paris, July 7, 1915. Genet is seated in the center. Victor Chapman is right behind Genet. Chapman was the first American pilot killed in the war.

Genet arrived in Le Havre, France on 29 January. He joined the French Foreign Legion and was sent for training in Lyon, where he became friends with Norman Prince. After months of lobbying, Prince was able to convince the French military to create the Lafayette Escadrille, a squadron of flyers that mostly consisted of Americans, with some French officers. Genet joined a year after its formation. Much to his happiness – as he had trouble with speaking French – he found several fellow Americans within the legion. He quickly became friends with Dr. David E. Wheeler, who had arrived earlier in the winter, becoming a Red Cross volunteer. He decided to join the Legion around the same time as Genet. The two served together until Wheeler was wounded in September 1915.

After six weeks of training, Genet was sent to the front in eastern France. Genet spent the next few months in the trenches seeing some action but nothing compared to what he would experience in late September. The Second Battle of Champagne started on September 25 and was the bloodiest battle of the war for the Legion. On 28 September, Genet's battalion attacked, losing their senior officers within moments of the attack. Genet found himself at front of the attack with only one other legionary. Realizing that the advance had been stopped, they decided to retreat back to their trench. The other legionary was wounded or possibly killed on the way back. Genet was one of the 31 men out of 500 who survived the battle unscathed. The battle saw French casualties near 190,000 in just three weeks of fighting.

Later, Genet was back fighting in the Bois Sabot; the rest of the company took shelter during an artillery barrage. A unit of Senegalese Tirailleurs took up the charge and Genet went with them. Genet was separated from his unit for three days, it was feared that he had been killed in the fighting and his death was reported in several papers. Other papers only reported him missing. Genet was proud of being an American, sought the company of his countrymen and for a while flew the Stars and Stripes on top of his tent. In many of his letters home, he wrote about his love for his country. He wrote of his excitement about the upcoming July 4 celebrations.

=== Lafayette Escadrille ===
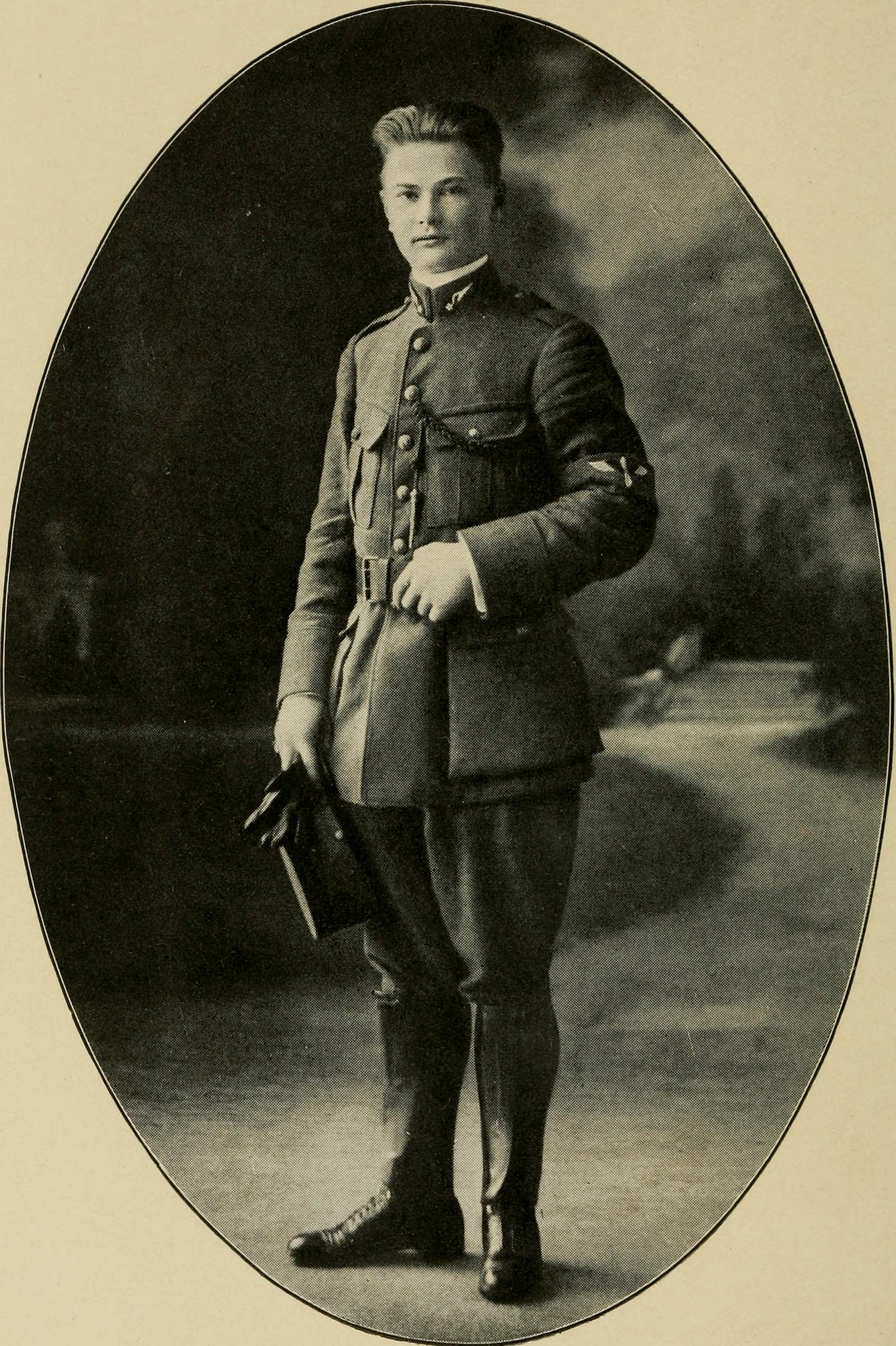
Edmond Genet on September 4, 1916. He was in the midst of his six-month training to become a fighter pilot

Genet finally got his wish of flying. After a year in the Legion and over eight months of applying, he was accepted to aviation school to become a pilot. He started school on 5 June 1916 and completed his training on 17 January 1917. During this time he promoted to corporal. He joined the Lafayette Escadrille on 22 January 1917. Within a few days, Genet received his own Nieuport 21 fighter to use on his first mission on 29 January. He was promoted to sergeant on 10 March, after completing over 20 sorties. Genet was with the last American flyer to be killed before America entered the war. On 19 March, Genet and James Rogers McConnell were flying over enemy lines near Verdun when they encountered two German aircraft. They each attacked an aircraft and both pilots became separated. Genet was wounded by a bullet that hit his cheek and his plane was badly damaged. McConnell's body and his aircraft were found a few days later by advancing French soldiers. Genet received the Croix de Guerre for this action. Genet was a talented drawer and painter, covering the Escadrille mess hall with his scenes of aerial combat. One wall was filled with the Indian head that became a symbol of the Escadrille.

== Death ==
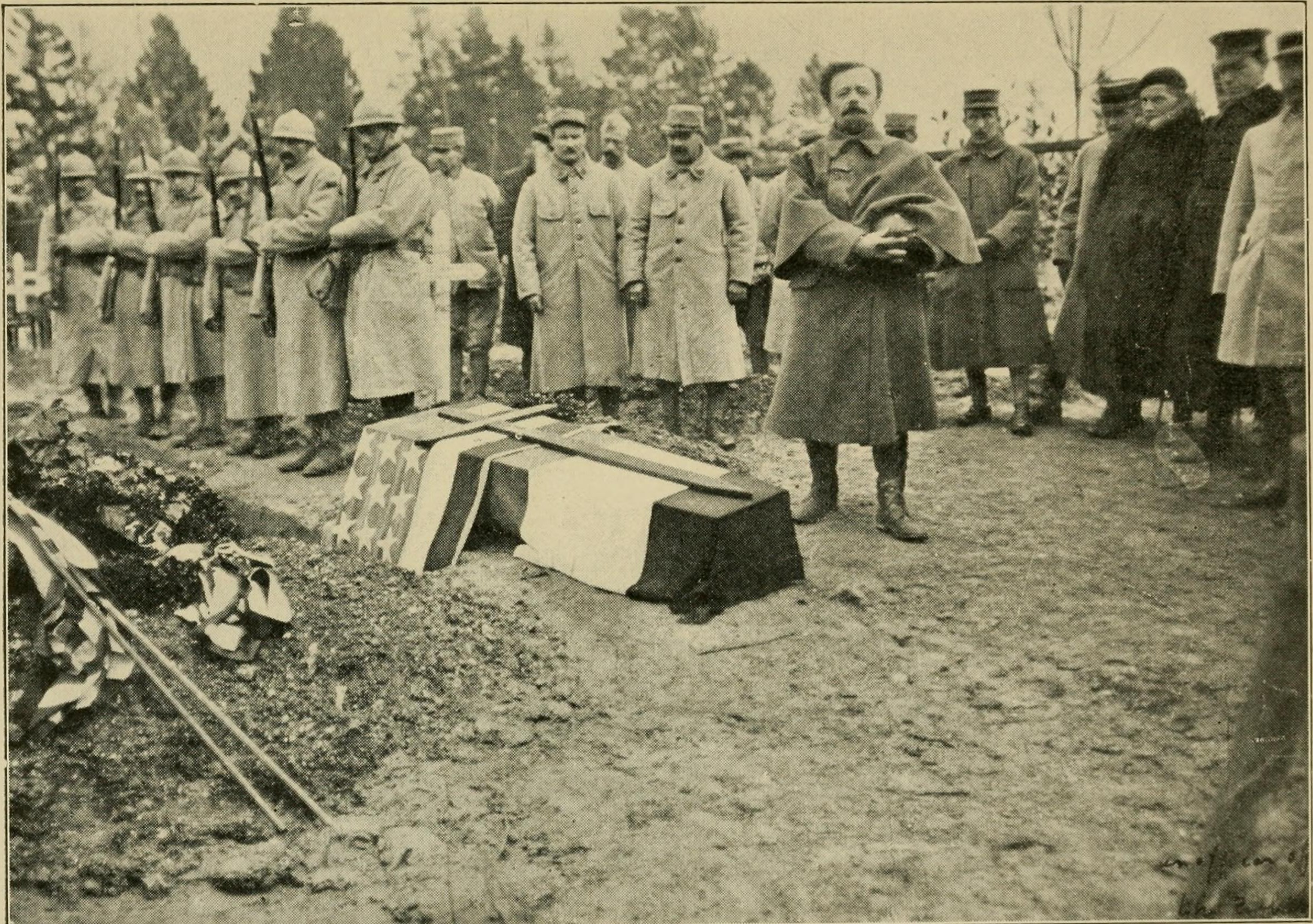
Genet was buried in France

Genet died on 17 April 1917 in France; he was 20 years old and had flown 37 sorties. On 16 April, he had flown a mission in the morning and came back feeling ill. He had been encouraged not to fly again that day as was scheduled but he was insistent and took off at 12:45pm. Genet and his wingman were to fly towards St Quentin at an altitude of 2,500 m (8,200 ft). Gervais Raoul Lufbery, one of the first members of the squadron and an ace pilot, flew as Genet's wingman. Because of low-cloud, they descended, which made them a target for anti-aircraft fire. Lufbery saw Genet turn but lost him in the clouds. After Lufbery returned to the base, the squadron received a call that Genet had crashed on a road 5 km (3.1 mi) from the French lines. It was believed that Genet was wounded by the anti-aircraft fire and lost consciousness. Due to the crash, which occurred at full-engine power, his body was so badly damaged that it was unclear if he had been wounded. Since he had been complaining of feeling ill, he might have lost consciousness due to that rather than being wounded.

Genet was buried with full military honors in the military cemetery at Ham, Somme, in a driving snowstorm. His final wish was to be buried wrapped in the French flag and have his coffin be covered with the French and American flags to "show that I died for the two countries". After the war, Genet, along with many other members of the Lafayette Escadrille were reburied at the La Fayette Escadrille Memorial Cemetery, in Marnes-la-Coquette, outside of Paris. As a result of his lie about his age to the passport officer, his commanding officer Georges Thenault believed that he was four years older than he actually was. In the letter to Genet's mother, he expressed shock that Genet was actually 24 years of age as he looked so young. In reality, Genet died at 20 years.

The American entry into World War I took place on 6 April. While Genet was not a member of the US military at the time, he is widely considered to be the first American to be killed after the declaration of war between the US and Germany.

== Status with the United States Navy ==
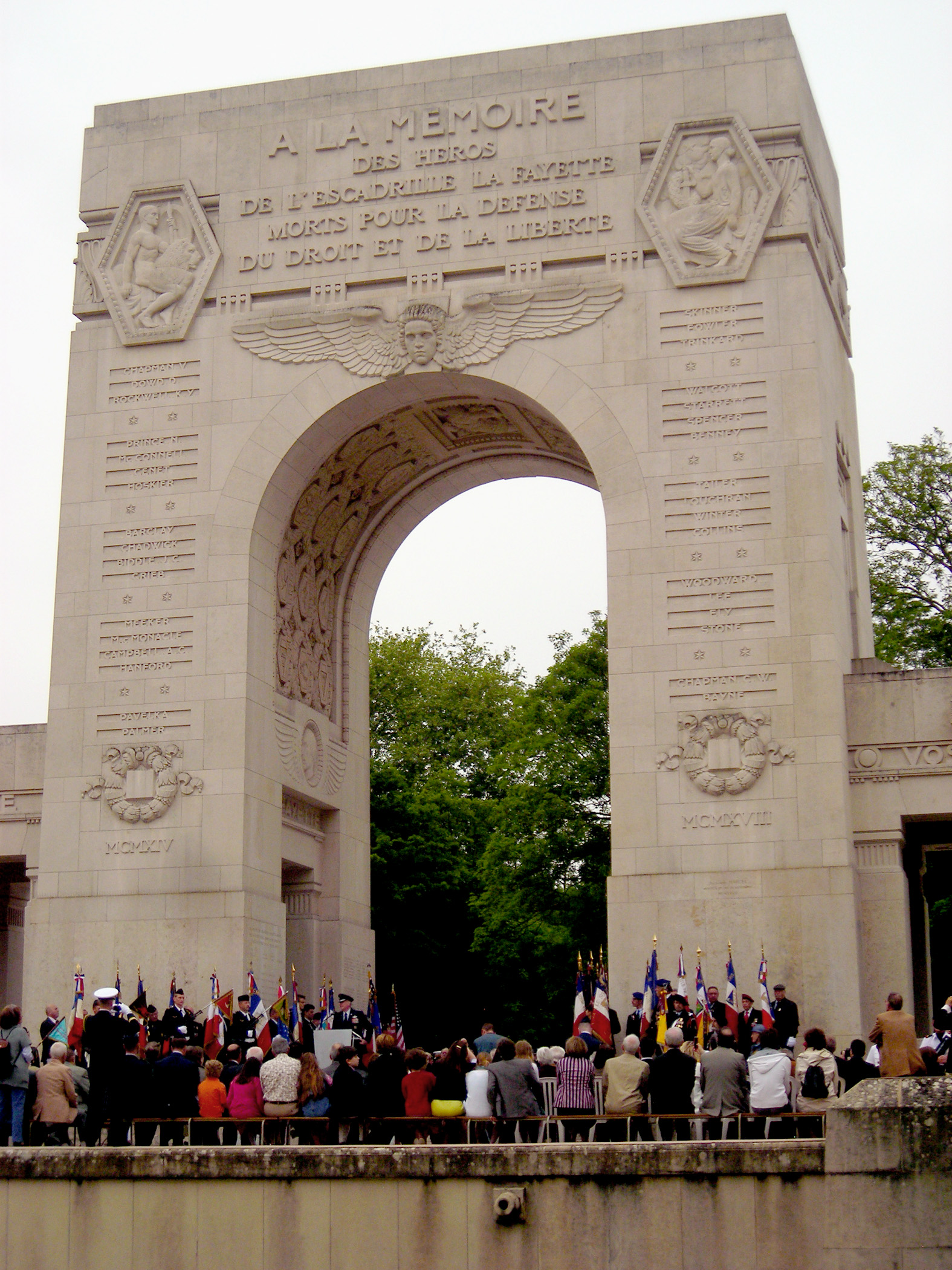
Genet was reburied at the Lafayette Escadrille Memorial Cemetery in 1928

When Genet left for France in January 1915, he had left the Navy without permission. This decision weighed heavily on him as time wore on, since he could be classified as a deserter. The US was not yet formally in the war and his involvement in the French military was therefore not an official assignment by the US military. While the Navy did not attempt to seek Genet out, he felt unhappy over his absence, fearing the loss of his citizenship. The US was still neutral, being involved in the war might have been considered a treasonous act as it was a direct action in violation of US neutrality.

Throughout his stay in France, Genet, along with other members of the Escadrille, participated in social events hosted by many American supporters of the war who lived in France. He was particularly celebrated, since it was known that he was the descendant of Citizen Genet. As the prospect of American involvement in the war grew, he became increasingly worried and hopeful that his participation in the Escadrille would not be affected by the American entry into the war and sought the help of prominent Americans in France to help him resolve his status. Genet died shortly after the formal entry of the US into the war. Although other Americans had died as part of the Escadrille, he was the first one to do so after the US declaration, which made him the first official American casualty of the war, despite the fact that the US had not yet had time to organize or send any actual troops to Europe. President Woodrow Wilson sent a letter of condolences to Genet's mother, as did the French ambassador and the chairman of the Senate Foreign Relations committee. The war department posthumously sent his family a letter stating that his service was to be considered in all respects honorable. Josephus Daniels, Secretary of the Navy, wrote:

Edmond Charles Clinton Genet may properly be considered as having honorably terminated an enlistment with an ally, since he died on the field of battle. I, myself, am honored in having the privilege of deciding that the record of Edmond Genet, ordinary seaman, United States Navy, shall be considered in every respect as an honorable one.

== Posthumous collection of letters ==
In 1918, Genet's letters from France were collected in a book, edited by Grace Ellery Channing. War Letters of Edmond Genet: The First American Aviator Killed Flying the Stars and Stripes was published in June 1918. Author John Jay Chapman wrote the introduction. His son, Victor Chapman, served with Genet before his death in 1916. The letters were written between 1914 and April 1917 and his last letter was written the day before his death. Most of them were addressed to his mother, others were to his brothers or to his Legion friend David Wheeler. The last section of the book was a series of letters written after Genet's death, including several from his commanding officers that were addressed to his mother. A few letters of condolences such as the one from President Woodrow Wilson can also be found in the book. Reviews of the book were quite positive.
