= Diane de Margerie =

French writer (1927–2023)

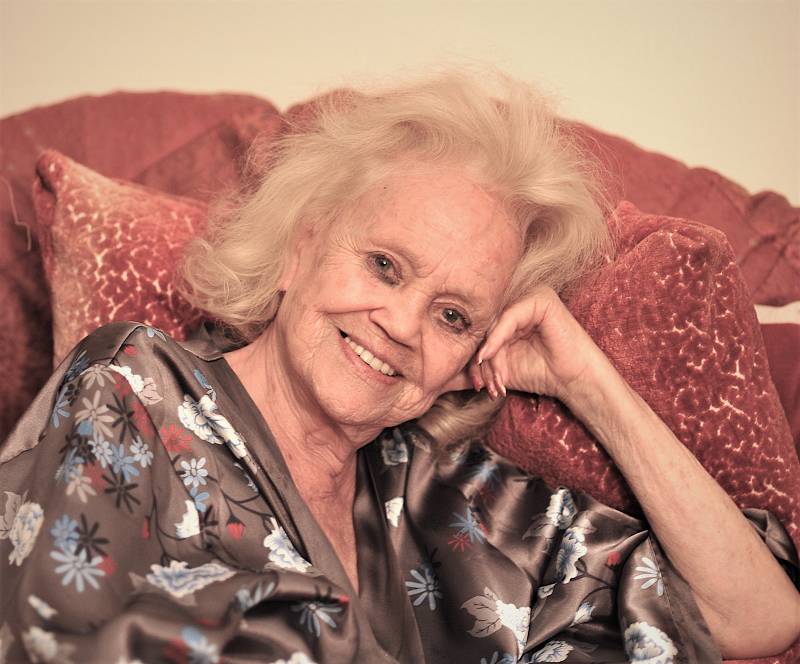
- Margerie in 2017
- Born: Diane Jeanne Marie Jacquin de Margerie; 24 December 1927; 7th arrondissement of Paris, France
- Died: 25 August 2023 (aged 95); 14th arrondissement of Paris, France
- Resting place: Saint-Maixme-Hauterive Cemetery
- Occupation: Translator
- Spouse: Dominique Fernandez (divorced)
- Children: Ramon Fernandez

Diane Jacquin de Margerie (24 December 1927 – 25 August 2023) was a French woman of letters and translator from English.

== Biography ==
Diane de Margerie was the daughter of Jenny Fabre-Luce (1896–1991) and Roland de Margerie (1899–1990). Her father was the nephew of writer Edmond Rostand and the cousin of Gérard Mante, who married Marcel Proust's niece. Her mother was loved by Rainer Maria Rilke.

Diane de Margerie was the sister of Bertrand de Margerie (1923–2003), a Jesuit and theologian, and Emmanuel Jacquin de Margerie (1924–1991), ambassador of France to the United States.

de Margerie first married Prince Ricardo Pignatelli della Leonessa (1927–1985). A son was born in 1952, Fabrizio Pignatelli della Leonessa, who would go on to become a diplomat and serve as Italian ambassador to Guatemala and Honduras. Her second marriage was to the writer Dominique Fernandez; the couple had a son, Ramon Fernandez, and a daughter, Laetitia Fernandez.

A novelist, literary critic, short story writer, biographer, and translator, de Margerie was the author of a diverse body of work.

Once a member of the Prix Femina jury, she received several awards. She lived in China and Italy.

In La Femme en pierre (1989), de Margerie celebrates the Chartres Cathedral, the city where she lived. With Isola, Retour des îles Galapagos, she recounts, in a poetic style, her impressions of travel.

Diane de Margerie died in Paris on 25 August 2023, at the age of 95.

== Works ==
- 1974: Le Détail révélateur, novel, Flammarion, Paris
- 1976: Le Paravent des enfers, novel, Flammarion
- 1979: L’Arbre de Jessé, novel, Flammarion
- 1979: La Volière, récit, Éditions Balland, Paris
- 1980: Ailleurs et autrement, short stories, Flammarion
- 1982: Duplicités, short stories, Flammarion
- 1985: Le Ressouvenir, Flammarion
- 1989: La Femme en pierre, Éditions Gallimard, coll. « L'un et l'autre », Paris
- 1992: Marcel Proust (Marcel et Léonie), Christian Pirot
- 1994: Le Jardin secret de Marcel Proust, album, photographs by André Martin, Albin Michel, Paris
- 1996: Dans la spirale, Gallimard, coll. « Haute Enfance », Paris
- 1997: Bestiaire insolite du Japon, Albin Michel
- 1998: Autour de Gustave Moreau, Christian Pirot
- 2000: Edith Wharton, lecture d'une vie, biography
- 2001: Maintenant, Mercure de France, Paris
- 2003: Isola, Retour des îles Galapagos, Éditions Pauvert, Paris
- 2004: Aurore et George, biography, Albin Michel
- 2006: L’Étranglée, novel, Mercure de France
- 2007: Noces d'encre, essay, Philippe Rey
- 2010: Proust et l’obscur, essay, Albin Michel
- 2012: Passion de l’énigme, Mercure de France
- 2013: Éclats d’insomnie, Éditions Grasset
- 2016: De la grenouille au papillon, Arléa
- 2016: A la recherche de Robert Proust, Flammarion

== Prizes and distinctions ==
- 1985: Prix Marcel Proust for Le Ressouvenir
- 1994: Commandeurs of the Ordre des Arts et des Lettres
- 1996: Prix Jacques-Chardonne and prix du Pen club français, for Dans la spirale
- 2000: Prix Marcel-Thiébaut, prix France-Amérique, for Edith Wharton, lecture d'une vie
- 2001: Prix littéraire Prince-Pierre-de-Monaco, for all her work
- 2004: Prix Médicis essai for Aurore et George
- 2008: Commander of the National Order of Merit (France)
- 2009: Prix Contrepoint for La passion Brando
- 2013: Prix Cazes for Éclats d'insomnie
- 2015: Officer of the Legion of Honour
