= Philippe Étienne =

French diplomat (born 1955)

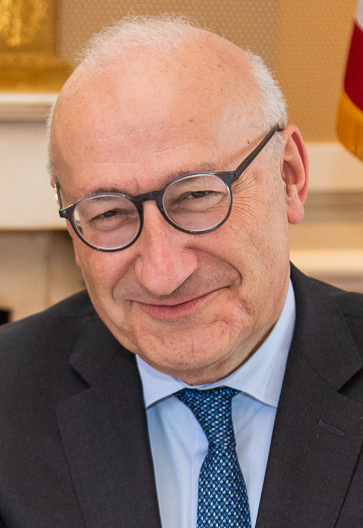
- Étienne in 2020

Ambassador of France to the United States
- In office 9 July 2019 (Note: Recalled on 17 September 2021) – 6 February 2023
- President: Emmanuel Macron
- Preceded by: Gérard Araud
- Succeeded by: Laurent Bili

Sherpa of the President of France
- In office 19 September 2017 – 20 May 2019
- President: Emmanuel Macron
- Preceded by: Jacques Audibert
- Succeeded by: Emmanuel Bonne

Ambassador of France to Germany
- In office 2 September 2014 – 6 June 2017
- President: François Hollande
- Preceded by: Maurice Gourdault-Montagne
- Succeeded by: Anne-Marie Descôtes

Personal details
- Born: Philippe Noël Marie Marc Étienne; 24 December 1955 (age 70) Neuilly-sur-Seine, France
- Education: École normale supérieure Institut national des langues et civilisations orientales École nationale d'administration
- Occupation: Diplomat

Philippe Noël Marie Marc Étienne (French pronunciation: [filip etjɛn]; born 24 December 1955) is a French diplomat who served as Ambassador of France to the United States from 2019 to 2023. He previously served as chief diplomatic adviser to the President of France, Emmanuel Macron, from 2017 to 2019. Étienne was nominated as Ambassador to the United States effective 30 May 2019.

In response to the AUKUS agreement, he was recalled to France in September 2021. The measure was unprecedented; in almost 250 years of diplomatic relations, France had never before recalled its US ambassadorship. The Biden administration tried to placate French anger. Jean-Pierre Thébault, the French Ambassador to Australia, was also recalled.

== Biography ==
Étienne was born in Neuilly-sur-Seine, Paris. He entered the École normale supérieure in 1974, and graduated the École nationale d'administration in 1980, alongside François Hollande and Michel Sapin. He also has an agrégation in mathematics and studied Serbo-Croat at INALCO.

As a diplomat, he has served in Belgrade (1981-1983), Bonn (1985-1987), the French mission to the EU in Brussels (1988-1991 and 1997-2002), Moscow (1991-1994) and Bucharest (ambassador to Romania, 2002-2005). He has also served in various roles in Paris, notably as president of the Agency for French Education Abroad (2004-2007). He has also worked as deputy chief-of-staff to Hervé de Charette (1995-1997) and as chief-of-staff to Bernard Kouchner (May 2007-April 2009). In the latter role, he was closely involved in the 2008 G20 Washington summit following the 2008 financial crisis, the evacuation of French citizens from Tbilisi during the Russian invasion of Georgia, and the French presidency of the Council of the European Union.

From 31 July 2014 he served as French ambassador to Germany. In April 2017, he was designated to replace Jean-Maurice Ripert as French ambassador to Russia, but was instead appointed diplomatic adviser to President Emmanuel Macron on 14 May. Étienne’s appointment was widely interpreted as signaling a desire for close ties to Germany and the EU.

He was made a knight of the Légion d'honneur on 22nd 2003, and was promoted to officer on 1 January 2013. He was made a knight of the National Order of Merit on 14 May 1994.

Besides French, Étienne speaks English, German, Serbo-Croat, Russian and Romanian.

He was nominated in May 2019 by President Emmanuel Macron as ambassador of France in the United States effective September 2019.

== Publications ==
- "France is standing up against extremism, without compromising its values". Washingtonpost.com. November 28, 2020.
