= Louis-André Pichon =

French diplomat (1771–1854)

Louis-André Pichon (3 November 1771 – 10 September 1854) was a French diplomat, and French ambassador to the United States, particularly during the Louisiana Purchase.

== Family and education ==
Louis-Andre Pichon was born in Nantes, the son of Simeon Pichon, shoemaker, and Jeanne Fortier. He studied at the College of Oratory and then studied philosophy at the Lycée Louis-le-Grand in Paris from 1790.

== Diplomatic career ==
He was originally a French diplomat in Philadelphia from 1793 to 1796, before returning to Paris to make a reconciliation, between the two countries after the Quasi-War, that led to the Treaty of Mortefontaine.

He was ambassador to France and chargé d'affaires in Washington, D.C. from 1801 to 1804. He expressed strong criticism, when the U.S. resumed trade relations with the parties in Haiti freed by the black general Jean-Jacques Dessalines, at the failure of the expedition to Saint-Domingue.

During the Saint-Domingue expedition, he struggled to ensure adequate supplies to the military, but quarreled with Charles Leclerc. The brother of Peter Bauduy, Louis Alexander Amelia Bauduy Bellevue was also a captain in the army of Leclerc, after having fought in 1797, alongside the English against Toussaint Louverture.

=== Louisiana Purchase ===
France had then secretly acquired Louisiana, and diplomat Robert Livingston negotiated the Louisiana Purchase as a whole, in 1803. On 1 October 1802, Louis-Andre Pichon wrote to the U.S. government to reassure them, when the Spanish intendant of New Orleans decided to terminate the offloading of U.S. merchants in the port, which was French property, following a secret treaty in 1800.

== Later life ==
He was recalled to Paris 15 September 1804, reportedly for failing to thwart the marriage of Jérôme Bonaparte with an American, Elizabeth Patterson, but also for frankness. He finished his career under Napoleon, as a civil servant in Westphalia.

He married Emilie Brongniart (1780–1847), and they had three children. He was made a baron, in the Bourbon Restoration.

He died in Paris on 10 September 1854.
