= Joseph Alexandre Jacques Durant de Mareuil =

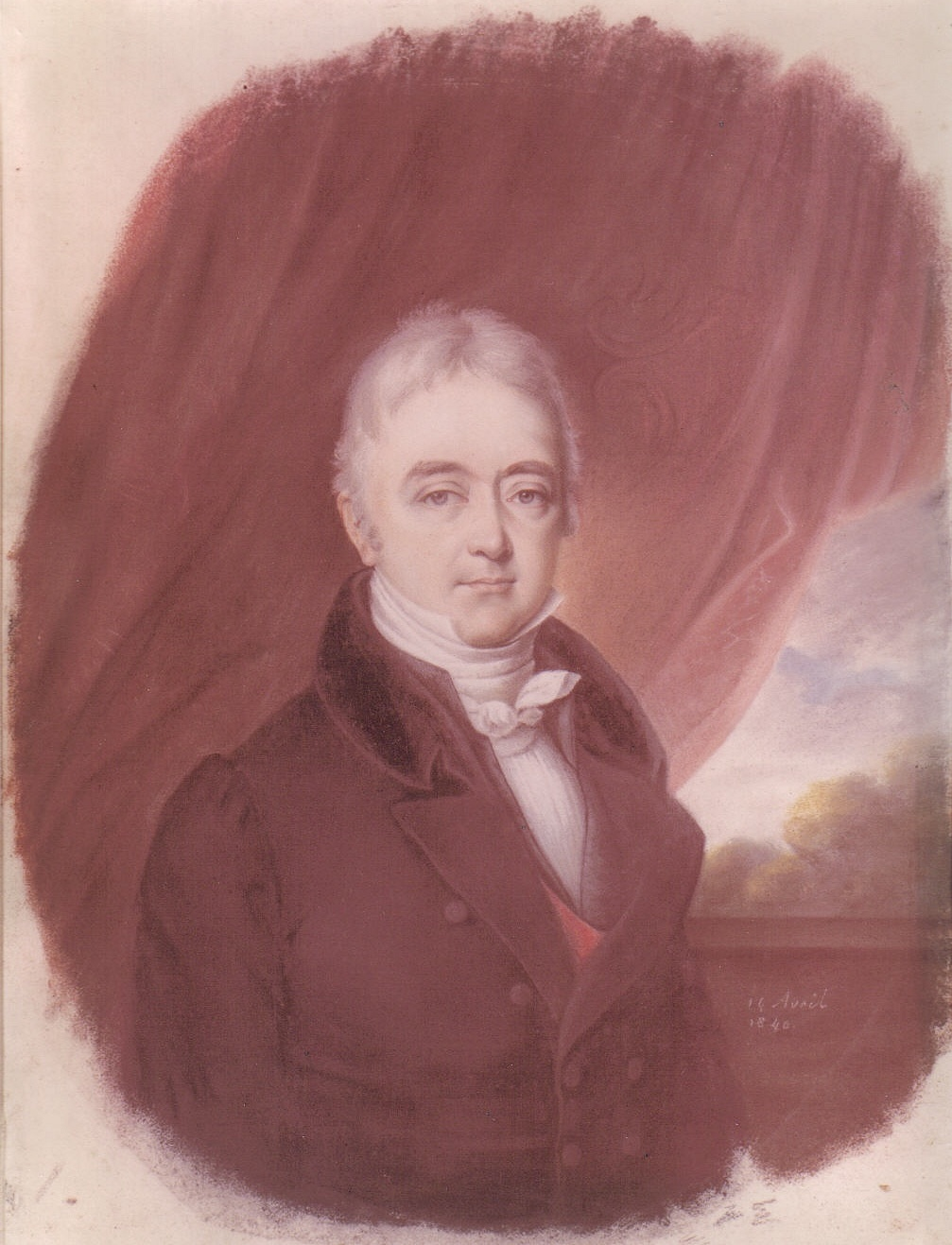

French Ambassador to the United States
- In office 1824–1830

ambassador of France to Naples
- Incumbent
- Assumed office 1834

Joseph Alexandre Jacques Durant de Mareuil (6 November 1769 – 13 January 1855) was a French diplomat who served as the French ambassador to the United States from 1824 to 1830.

== Biography ==
In 1793, he served in the army of the Rhine as an assistant engineer, in the battle of Wissembourg, and was at the battle of Geissberg.

In 1794, he was the First Secretary of the French Legation to Copenhagen, then head of the Political Division of the Ministry of Foreign Affairs from 1796. He then served as Minister Plenipotentiary to Dresden, Stuttgart and Naples.

He was created a Baron of the Empire on 24 February 1809. Then, on 1 January 1812, having quarreled with Prince Dmitri Dolgorukov, the Russian minister, he was recalled to France in January 1814, after the defection of Prince Murat at Naples, becoming interim Minister of Foreign Affairs during the First Restoration.

During the Hundred Days, he was a member of the Marne, elected in the borough of Épernay, from 15 May to 13 July 1815. At the Bourbon Restoration, he became a State Councillor and he was sent as minister plenipotentiary to the king of the Netherlands in 1820. He then led several missions in America and Europe. He was made peer of France in 1832, and received the Grand Cordon of the Legion of Honor in 1834. He became ambassador of France to Naples, but was suddenly recalled after eighteen months for a reason remained unknown.

He retired to his estates in Champagne.

== Honours ==
- Grand cordon, Légion d'honneur
