= Hervé Alphand =

French diplomat (1907–1994)

Ambassador of France to the United States
- In office 1956–1965
- President: René Coty; Charles de Gaulle
- Preceded by: Maurice Couve de Murville
- Succeeded by: Charles Lucet

Personal details
- Born: 31 May 1907 Paris, France
- Died: 13 January 1994 (aged 86) Paris, France

Hervé Alphand (31 May 1907 – 13 January 1994) was a French diplomat, and French ambassador to the United States, from 1956 to 1965.

== Life ==
Born into a family of diplomats, he studied law and graduated in political science. In 1930, he joined the Inspectorate General of Finance. He married the same year, a music-hall singer, Claude Raynaud; they divorced in 1957.

In 1934, he was sent to Ankara to help the government of Turkey to reorganize the finances of Turkey, and he was appointed Financial Attaché in Moscow in 1936, before taking up positions in the Department of Commerce.

== Economic adviser to De Gaulle ==
At the outbreak of World War II, he was financial advisor of the Embassy of France in Washington, D.C. Opposed to the Vichy regime, he resigned in 1941, and joined Charles de Gaulle in London. He was then appointed National Commissioner for the Economy, Finance and the Colonies and Director of Economic Affairs of the French Committee of National Liberation (CFLN), first in London and then in Algiers, and became a close advisor to De Gaulle.

At the liberation of Paris in 1944, he became Director of Economic Affairs, Ministry of Foreign Affairs. As such he participated in conferences on security and reconstruction in Europe. He was representative of France to the sixteen nation Conference in Paris, in July 1947, which developed the Marshall Plan.

== Representative of France ==
Raised to the rank of ambassador of France in 1950, he was the French representative to NATO between 1952 and 1954, then Permanent Representative of France to the UN in 1955. He served as ambassador of France to the United States between 1956 and 1965. He played a leading role in the Franco-American relations. This included explaining the war in Algeria in the context of decolonization, and with the return of De Gaulle to power in 1958, justifying the French position on NATO, which resulted in the withdrawal of France from the integrated military command of the organization in 1966.

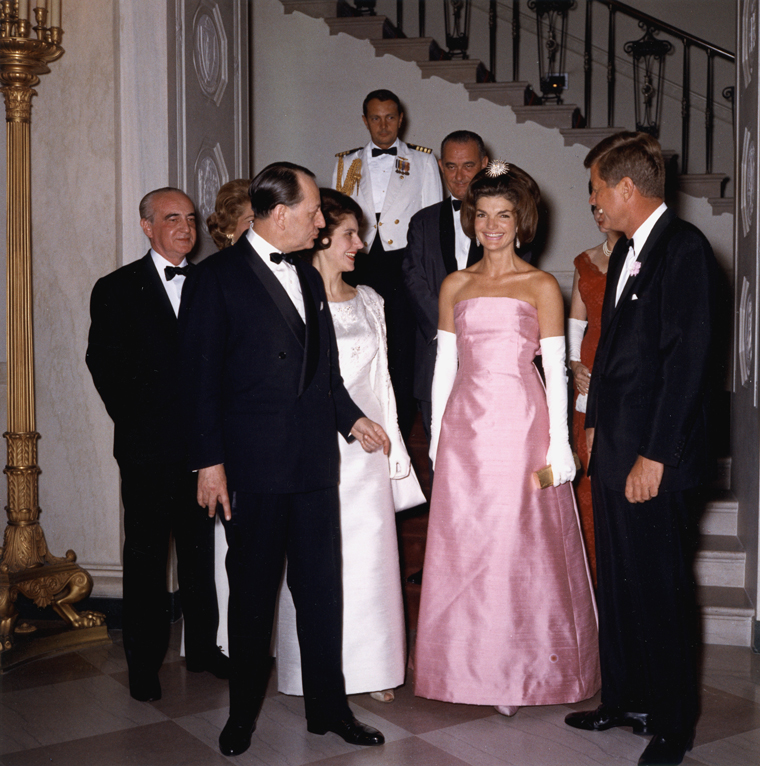
Dinner in Honor of Andre Malraux

During their stay in Washington, and his wife Nicole Alphand (ex-wife of Stephen Bunau-Varilla), whom he married in 1958, made the Embassy of France renowned for diplomatic receptions during the Kennedy administration.

Back in Paris in 1965, he became secretary general of the Ministry of Foreign Affairs until 1972. He then performed diplomatic missions in the Middle East and the Far East. In 1977, he published his memoirs, Wonder of being: a journal 1939 to 1973.

He died in Paris. He is buried at Passy Cemetery.

== Works ==
- L'Étonnement d'être, journal 1939-1973, Fayard, 1977.
- Le Partage de la dette ottomane et son règlement, Preface Anatole de Monzie, Paris: Les Éditions internationales, 1928
