= Henri Bonnet =

French diplomat (1888–1978)

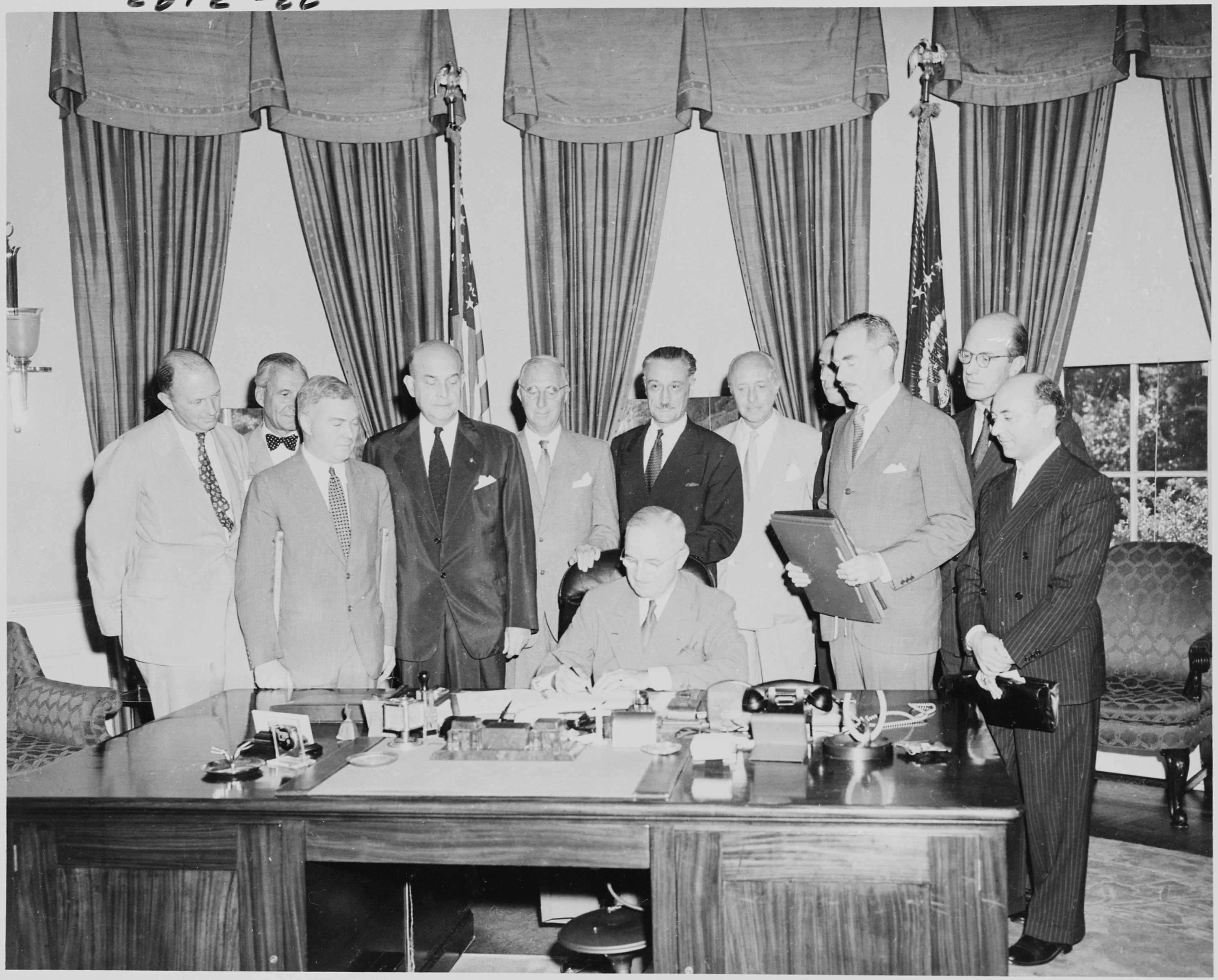
Bonnet standing behind Truman signing the North Atlantic Treaty (1949)

Henri Bonnet (French pronunciation: [ɑ̃ʁi bɔnɛ]; 26 May 1888 in Châteauponsac, Haute-Vienne – 25 October 1978 in Paris) was a French politician and diplomat who served as the French ambassador to the United States from 1944 to 1954.

The son of J. Th. and Marie Thérèse (Lascoux) Bonnet; he was educated at the Lycées of Tours and Paris; the University of Paris; École Normale Supérieure, Paris 1921. He was married to Hellé Zervoudaki. He was foreign editor for "Ere Nouvelle" in 1919; Director, International Institute of Intellectual Cooperation, 1931-40.

He was a member of the secretariat of the League of Nations from 1921 to 1931. He was Information Commissioner in the French Committee of National Liberation (CFLN), and the Provisional Government of the French Republic (GPRF), from 3 June to 9 September 1944. He was named, after the official recognition of GFRP by the United States, the representative of France in Washington.

== Works ==
- The world's destiny and the United States, World Citizens Association, 1941
- The United Nations on the way: principles and policies, World Citizens Association, 1942
- Intellectual co-operation in world organization, American Council on Public Affairs, 1942
