= Félix de Beaujour =

French politician, historian, and ambassador (1765–1836)

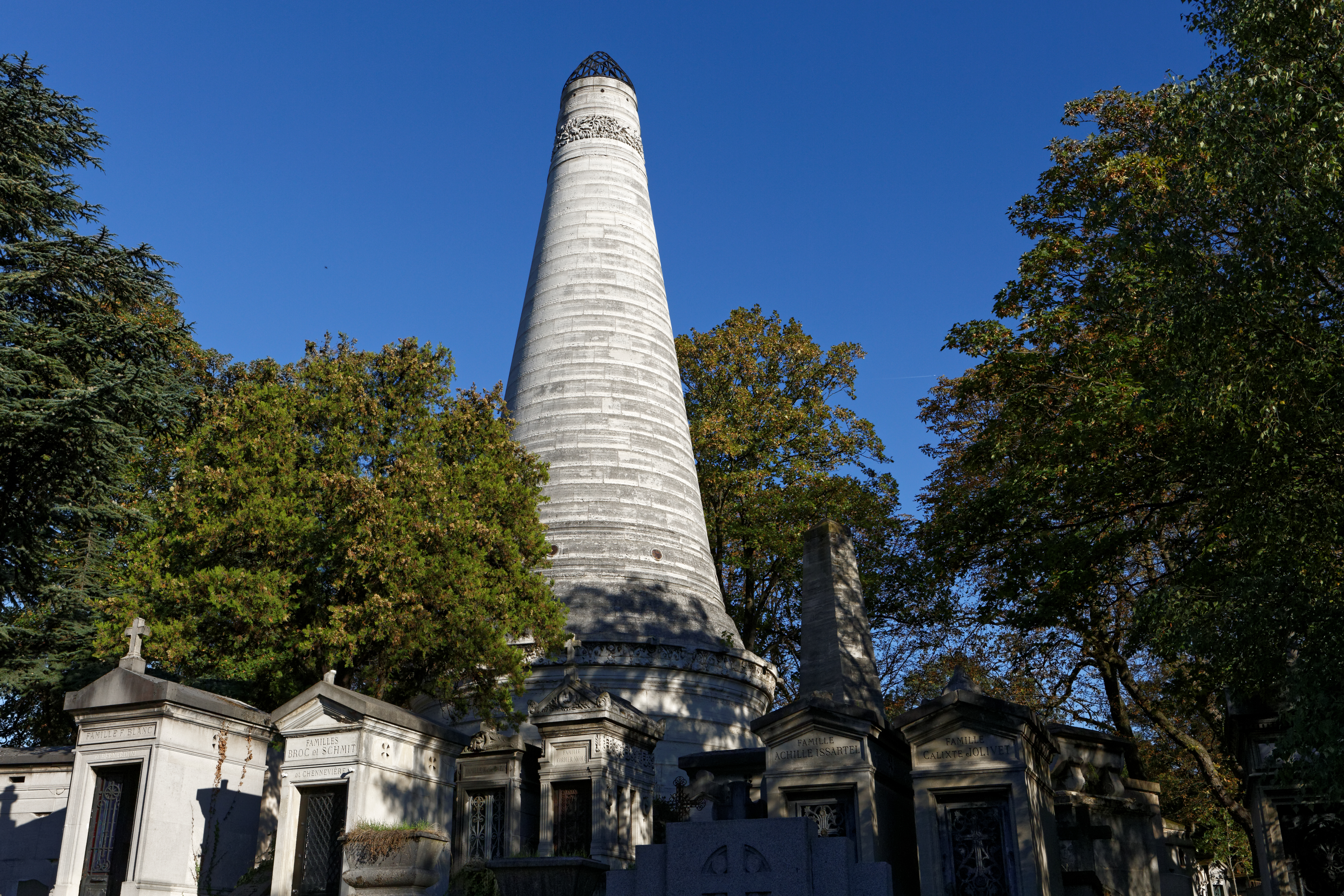
Grave in the cemetery of Père Lachaise

Louis Félix-Auguste-Beaujour, (Louis-Auguste Feris) (28 December 1765 Callas, Var – 1 July 1836, Paris) was a French diplomat, politician, historian, and French ambassador to the United States.

== Biography ==
He studied in Aix-en-Provence and Paris, and entered the diplomatic service. He was successively secretary of legation in Munich in 1790, and Dresden in 1791, then consul general in Greece in 1794, and Consul General in charge of business in Sweden in 1799.

Back in France in 1800, Abbe Sieyes, appointed him a member of the Tribunat, where he was successively secretary and president of the Tribunat in 1803. Upon the dissolution of the assembly, he went to the United States as Commissioner General, with a mission to raise the money for the French government, that had been delegated to Mexico, by Spanish subsidies. After consul general in Washington from 1804 to 1811, he returned to France in 1814. Talleyrand made him Consul General in Smyrna in 1816, then Inspector General of the French Establishments in the Levant in 1817. In 1818, Louis XVIII gave the title of baron, and he then changed his name (Feris) to (Félix).

He was then deputy of the Bouches-du-Rhône from 1831 to 1834, and a peer of France in 1835. In 1836, he was elected member of the Academy of Moral and Political Sciences. He founded a five-year prize, called the Felix Beaujour Awards, and awarded for the first time in 1832, awarded by the Academy, to the author of the best book on how to prevent or alleviate poverty.

The tomb of Félix de Beaujour in Père Lachaise Cemetery, is a 20-meter high chimney-shaped tower.

== Works ==
- Tableau du commerce de la Grèce, formé d'après une année moyenne, depuis 1787 jusqu'en 1797 (2 volumes, 1799) Texte en ligne 2
  - A View of the Commerce of Greece: Formed After an Annual Average, from 1787 To 1797, Translator Thomas Hartwell Horne, Kessinger Publishing, LLC, 2010, ISBN 9781166542634
- Du traité de Lunéville (1801)
- Du traité d'Amiens (1802)
- Aperçu des États-Unis, au commencement du XIXe siècle, depuis 1800 jusqu'en 1810, avec des tables statistiques (1 volume, 1814)
- Théorie des gouvernements, ou Exposition simple de la manière dont on peut les organiser et les conserver dans l'état présent de la civilisation en Europe (2 volumes, 1823)
- Tableau des Révolutions de la France depuis la conquête des Francs jusqu'à l'établissement de la Charte, ou Examen critique des causes qui ont changé le Gouvernement français (1825)
- Voyage militaire dans l'Empire othoman, ou Description de ses frontières et de ses principales défenses, soit naturelles, soit artificielles (2 volumes, 1829)
- De l'Expédition d'Annibal en Italie, et de la meilleure manière d'attaquer et de défendre la péninsule italienne, avec une carte (1832)
