= Jean-Baptiste de Ternant =

French soldier, diplomat, and French ambassador

Jean Baptiste Ternant
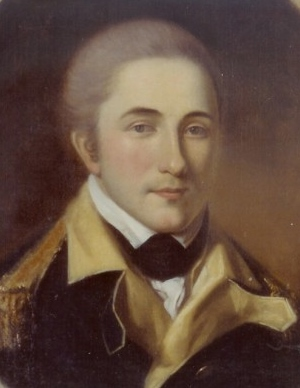
- Jean Baptiste Ternant, 1781, by Charles Willson Peale
- Born: 12 December 1751; Damvilliers
- Died: 15 November 1833 (aged 81); Paris
- Occupations: soldier, diplomat
- Known for: French ambassador to the United States

Jean Baptiste, chevalier de Ternant (12 December 1751 – 15 November 1833) was a French soldier, diplomat, and French ambassador to the United States from 1791 to 1793.

Born in Damvilliers, France, in 1751, he became a lieutenant in the Royal Corps of Engineers in 1772. During the American Revolutionary War, he volunteered to join the cause of the Patriots. Beginning in 1778 at Valley Forge, he served as a subinspector in the Continental Army. Ternant was elected to the American Philosophical Society in 1780.

After the American Revolution Ternant became a colonel in the Dutch and later French armies. During his service in the Dutch Republic, Ternant he was a commanding officer responsible for the defense of Amsterdam against the invading Prussians during the Patriottentijd events of 1787. He then served in various positions in France before briefly returning to the United States as a French minister in 1791. After the abolition of the French monarchy, he was dismissed by the ruling Girondins from his post and was succeeded by Edmond-Charles Genet. He then lived as a private citizen and avoided public service, including during the Napoleonic rule. He died in Paris in 1833.

The Independence National Historical Park has an oil portrait, painted by Charles Willson Peale in 1781.
