= Dominique Fernandez =

French novelist and travel writer (born 1929)

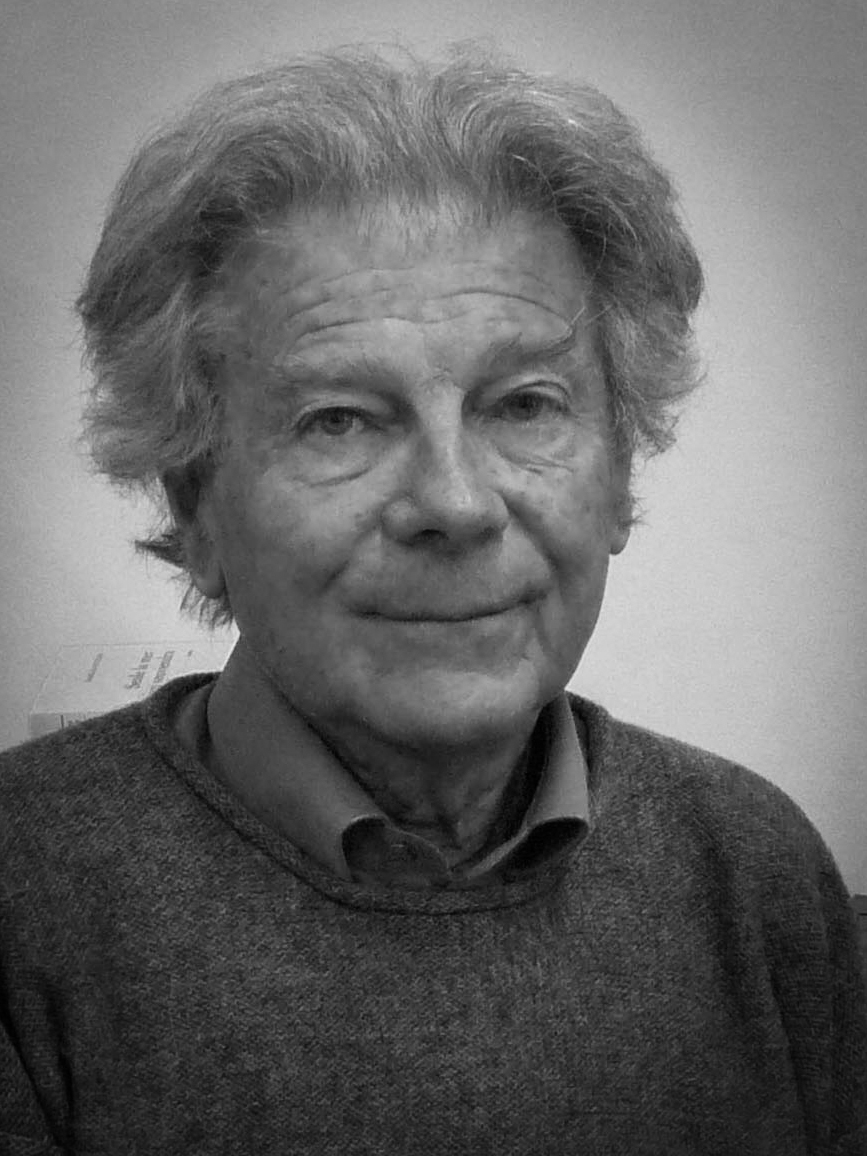
- Fernandez in 2009
- Born: 25 August 1929 (age 97); Neuilly-sur-Seine, France
- Education: École normale supérieure
- Known for: Member of the Académie Française
- Spouse: Diane de Margerie
- Children: 2

Dominique Fernandez (born 25 August 1929) is a French writer of novels, essays and travel books. Much of his writing explores homosexual experience and creativity. In 1982 he won the Prix Goncourt for his novel about Pier Paolo Pasolini; and in 2007 he was elected a member of the Académie Française.

== Biography ==
Fernandez was born in France on 25 August 1929, in Neuilly-sur-Seine, Hauts-de-Seine, near Paris. He is the son of Ramón Fernández, a literary critic whose reputation was tarnished when he served during World War II on the executive committee of the Parti Populaire Français, collaborating with France's Nazi occupiers. He died in 1944. Dominique Fernandez's inaugural speech in the Academy in 2007 was a defence of his father. Fernandez was educated at the École Normale Supérieure. He gained a doctorate in Italian literature.

In 1957 and 1958 he taught in Naples at the French Institute. Fernandez's literary career began in 1958 with a study of the modern Italian novel. He then worked as a literary critic for the weekly L'Express and as a reader for the publishers Grasset. He writes a regular column in the Swiss magazine of art and culture, Artpassions.

In 1961, he married Diane de Margerie, with whom he had a son, Ramon Fernandez, and a daughter, Laetitia Fernandez. They divorced in 1971. From 1966 to 1989 he taught Italian literature at the University of Haute-Bretagne at Rennes. He was then a critic for Le Nouvel Observateur and for an opera periodical. When he became a member of the Académie Française in 2007, he chose for the hilt of his ceremonial sword an image of Ganymede.
