= Charles Lucet =

French diplomat

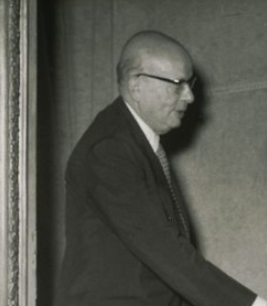

Ambassador of France to the United States
- In office 1965–1972
- President: Charles de Gaulle; Georges Pompidou
- Preceded by: Hervé Alphand
- Succeeded by: Jacques Kosciusco-Morizet

Personal details
- Born: 16 April 1910 Paris, France
- Died: 25 March 1990 (aged 79) Paris, France
- Education: Sciences-Po Paris

Ernest Charles Lucet (16 April 1910 in Paris – 25 March 1990) was a French diplomat, and French ambassador to the United States.

== Life ==
His father was a doctor. His younger brother, Jean Maurice was Lucet oil entrepreneur, his company had to manage, the Port of Bordeaux. Ernest Charles Lucet studied law at the École libre des sciences politiques. He entered the diplomatic service in 1930. In 1935, he was in the North America division of the French Foreign Ministry at the Quai d'Orsay, and was sent to attache to the embassy in Washington, where he was promoted to Counsellor. In November 1942, he was dismissed by the Vichy regime, he was followed by this recall, and did not join the exile government of de Gaulle, for which he was accredited to February 1943 in Washington. From 1943, he worked for de Gaulle in the Commissariat of Foreign Affairs of the government in exile in Algiers and was until 1945, the French ambassador to the Ankara government in exile.

From 1945 to 1946, he was Ambassador of the French Provisional Government in Beirut, with the Delegate General of the League of Nations Mandate for Syria and Lebanon, Paul Beynet, then from 1946 with Bechara El-Khoury in Lebanon. From 1947 to 1950, he was ambassador from the Fourth Republic to Farouk of Egypt.

From 1950 to 1953, he was employed at the French Foreign Ministry. From 1953 to 1955, he sat on the seat of France in the UN Security Council. From 1955 to 1959, he was counsellor at the French embassy in Washington under Maurice Couve de Murville and Hervé Alphand, during the Dwight D. Eisenhower administration.

From 1959 to 1965, he headed the French Foreign Ministry, the Department of Political Affairs. From 1965 to 1972, he was ambassador of the French government of Georges Pompidou to the governments of Lyndon B. Johnson and Richard Nixon. From 1972 to 1974, he was Ambassador of the Government of France, Georges Pompidou to Rome with Giovanni Leone.

He then worked in the private sector. He is the father of Jean-Louis Lucet, born in July 1933.
