= Jacques Andreani =

French diplomat

French ambassador to the United States
- In office 1989–1995
- President: François Mitterrand
- Preceded by: Emmanuel Jacquin de Margerie
- Succeeded by: François Bujon de l'Estang

Personal details
- Born: November 22, 1929 Paris, France
- Died: July 25, 2015 (aged 85) Pornic, France
- Education: Sciences-Po Paris, ÉNA
- Profession: Diplomat

Jacques Andreani (November 22, 1929 – July 25, 2015) was French ambassador to Egypt, Italy and the United States.

== Early life and career ==
Jacques Andreani was born in Paris. He graduated from the Sciences Po, ENA. From there, after working one year in Paris to learn basic Russian and to study Eastern European problems, he was assigned to Moscow, where he stayed during some of the most difficult periods of the Cold War – the construction of the Berlin wall and the 1962 Cuban Missile Crisis. He taught at the University of Clermont-Ferrand from 1996 to 1997, at The Johns Hopkins University SAIS Bologna Center from 1997 to 1998, and at LUISS, from 2000 to 2005.

== Chronological order of positions held ==
- Embassy Secretary at the French Embassy, Washington, D.C.
- Assistant Permanent Representative to NATO in 1970.
- Director of European Affairs in the French Foreign Ministry, from 1975 to 1979.
- Ambassador to Egypt from 1979 to 1981.
- Ambassador to Italy from 1984 to 1988.
- Ambassador to the United States, from 1989 to October 1995.
- Visiting Lecturer of Law and Political Science from 2000 to 2010.

== Awards & Distinctions ==
- Commander of the Order of the Polar Star
- Commandeur de la Légion d’Honneur
- Commandeur l’Ordre national du Mérite
- Commander of the Order of Merit of the Federal Republic of Germany (Verdienstorden der Bundesrepublik Deutschland)

== Associations ==
- President of the [United States] section of the French-American Association
- Honorary President of the Dante Alighieri society Munich, Germany.
- Honorary President of the Alumni Association of the Sciences-Po.
- Member of the Trilateral Commission,
- Member of the "Club Monaco", a private institution that brings together political, diplomatic groups.

== Works ==
- Amérique et nous. Odile Jacob. 2000. ISBN 978-2-7381-0885-2.
- Le Piège: Helsinki et la chute du communisme. Odile Jacob. 2005. ISBN 978-2-7381-1648-2.

== Personal life ==
He married Donatella Monterisi, who had been an American Field Service exchange student at Orange High School in 1962. He married her on March 23, 1981 and they had two children: Fabrice Andreani and Marie-Emmanuelle Andreani. He previously had another two children: Olivia Andreani and Gilles Andréani, from his first marriage to Huguette de Riols de Fonclare.
