= Jean Antoine Joseph Fauchet =

French diplomat and ambassador (1761–1834)

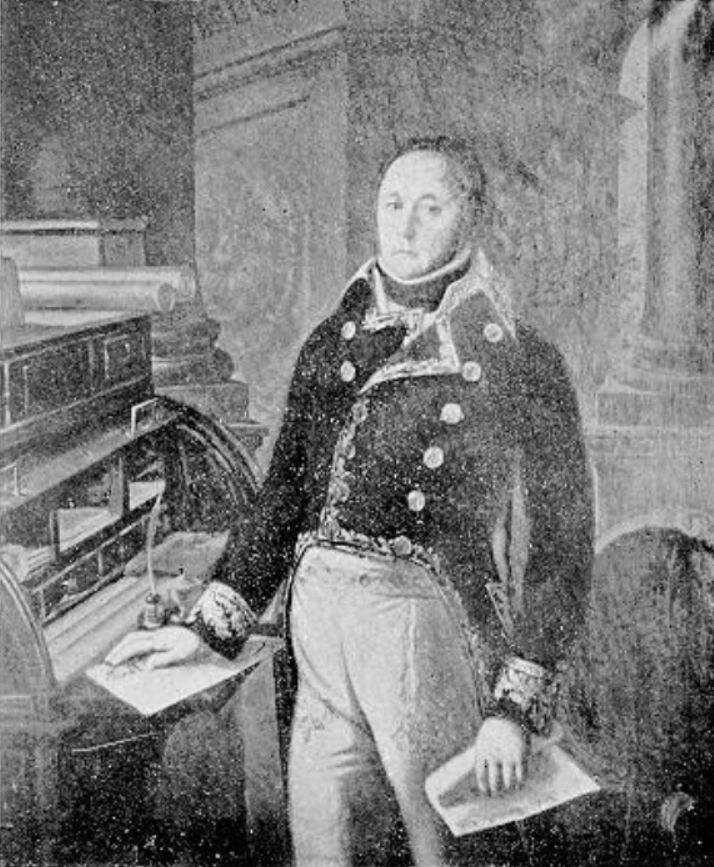
Portrait of Jean Antoine Joseph Fauchet.

Jean Antoine Joseph Fauchet (1761, in Saint-Quentin – 1834, in Paris) was a French diplomat, and French ambassador to the United States.

He studied law. When the French Revolution broke out, he published pamphlets praising the event. He was a secretary in the Ministry of War, and then Executive Council.

He was appointed ambassador to the United States, with orders to arrest Edmond-Charles Genêt. He wrote an essay about Franco-American relations and America itself (translated by W. Duane, 1797). He pressed the United States for repayment of the loans that had been made. Some of the letters that he wrote were intercepted and used to embarrass Edmund Randolph.

He supported Napoleon's coup d'etat, and was made a prefect of Var, and then Gironde. In 1805, he was made a baron. He was dismissed during the Bourbon Restoration in 1814.

== Works ==
- Coup d'oeil rapide sur l'etat actuel de nos rapports politiques avec les Etats Unis d'Amerique septentrionale, 1797
