= Roland de Margerie =

French diplomat (1899–1990)

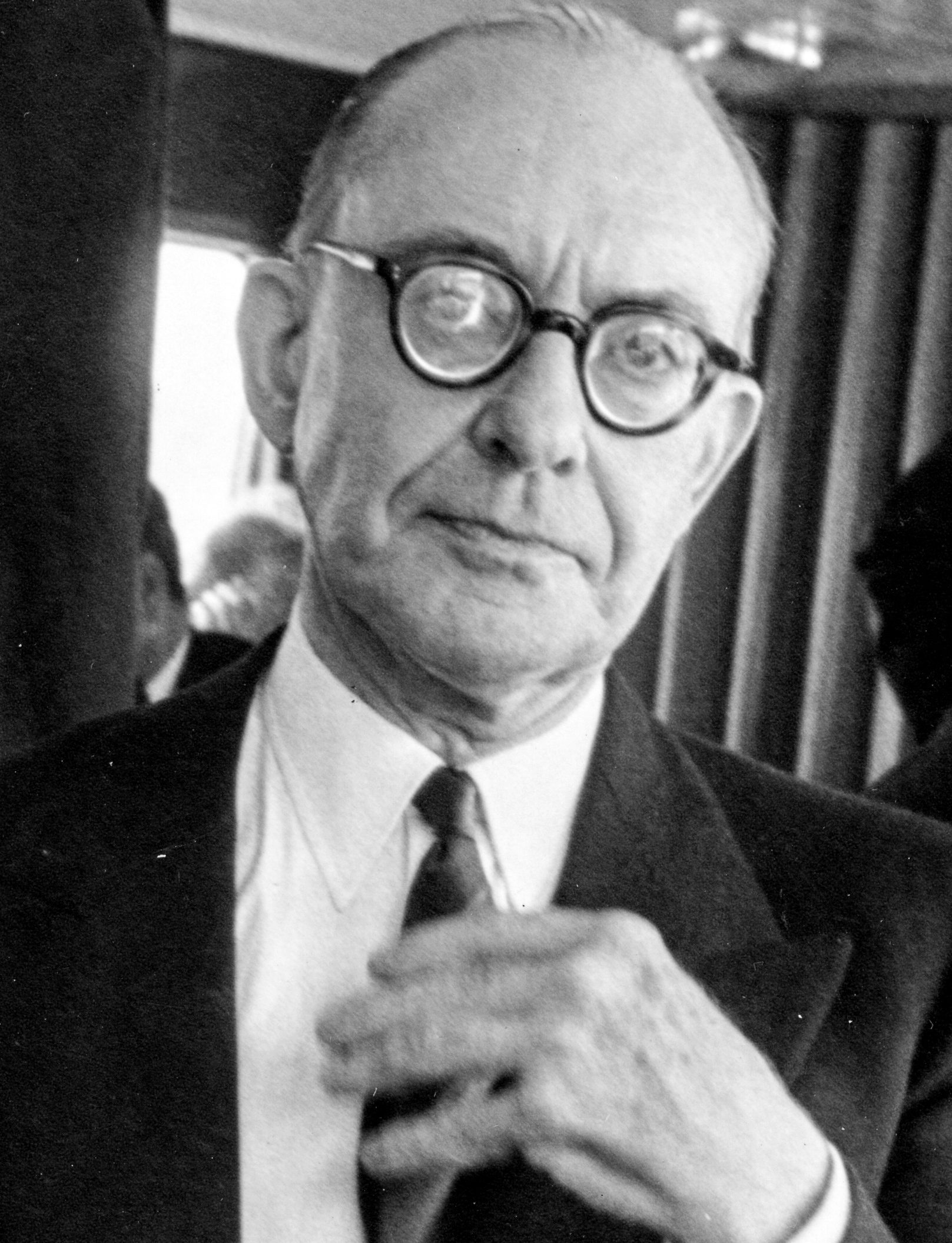
- Roland de Margerie in 1964

Ambassador of France to West Germany
- In office 1962–1965
- Chancellor: Konrad Adenauer
- Preceded by: François Seydoux
- Succeeded by: François Seydoux

Personal details
- Born: 6 May 1899 Copenhagen, Denmark
- Died: 13 July 1990 (aged 91) Neuilly-sur-Seine, France
- Children: 3, including Diane de Margerie
- Education: École Libre des Sciences Politiques
- Profession: Diplomat

Roland Jacquin de Margerie (1899 – July 1990) was a French diplomat.

He was the son of the diplomat Pierre de Margerie (1861-1942), who was Secretary General of the Ministry of Foreign Affairs in 1914 and French Ambassador to Berlin after World War I.

De Margerie studied at the École Libre des Sciences Politiques, and began his diplomatic career as the Secretary of the French Embassy in London before World War II, in the office of Paul Reynaud. He attended the Briare conference on 11 June 1940 between the French and British leaders, and wrote the official account. He was then governor of the Shanghai French Concession, and left in 1943 to the French legation in Beijing.

After World War II, de Margerie played an important role in the reconciliation with Germany. He later became Ambassador of France to the Holy See in 1958, at the death of Pope Pius XII and the election of Pope John XXIII. He was ambassador to Bonn in 1963, with the signing of the Élysée Treaty between Charles de Gaulle and Konrad Adenauer.

He is the father of Emmanuel Jacquin de Margerie (1924-1991), also a diplomat and ambassador of France in Spain, Great Britain and the United States, the Jesuit theologian Bertrand de Margerie (1923-2003) and the writer Diane de Margerie (1927-2023).

His extensive memoirs were published in 2012 (Roland de Margerie, Tous mes adieux sont faits, Mémoires inédits de Roland de Margerie, Edition en 5 volumes préparée par Laure de Margerie-Meslay, New York, 2012).
