= Bernard Vernier-Palliez =

Ambassador of France to the United States
- In office 1981–1984
- President: François Mitterrand
- Preceded by: François Lefebvre de Laboulaye
- Succeeded by: Emmanuel Jacquin de Margerie

Personal details
- Born: 2 March 1918
- Died: 12 December 1999 (aged 81)
- Education: HEC Paris; Sciences Po

Bernard Vernier-Palliez (2 March 1918 – 12 December 1999) was a French businessman, diplomat, and French Ambassador to the United States, from 1982 to 1984.

He was chairman and Chief Executive Officer of Renault Automobiles, from 1975 to 1981.
