= Laurent Bili =

French ambassador to the United States

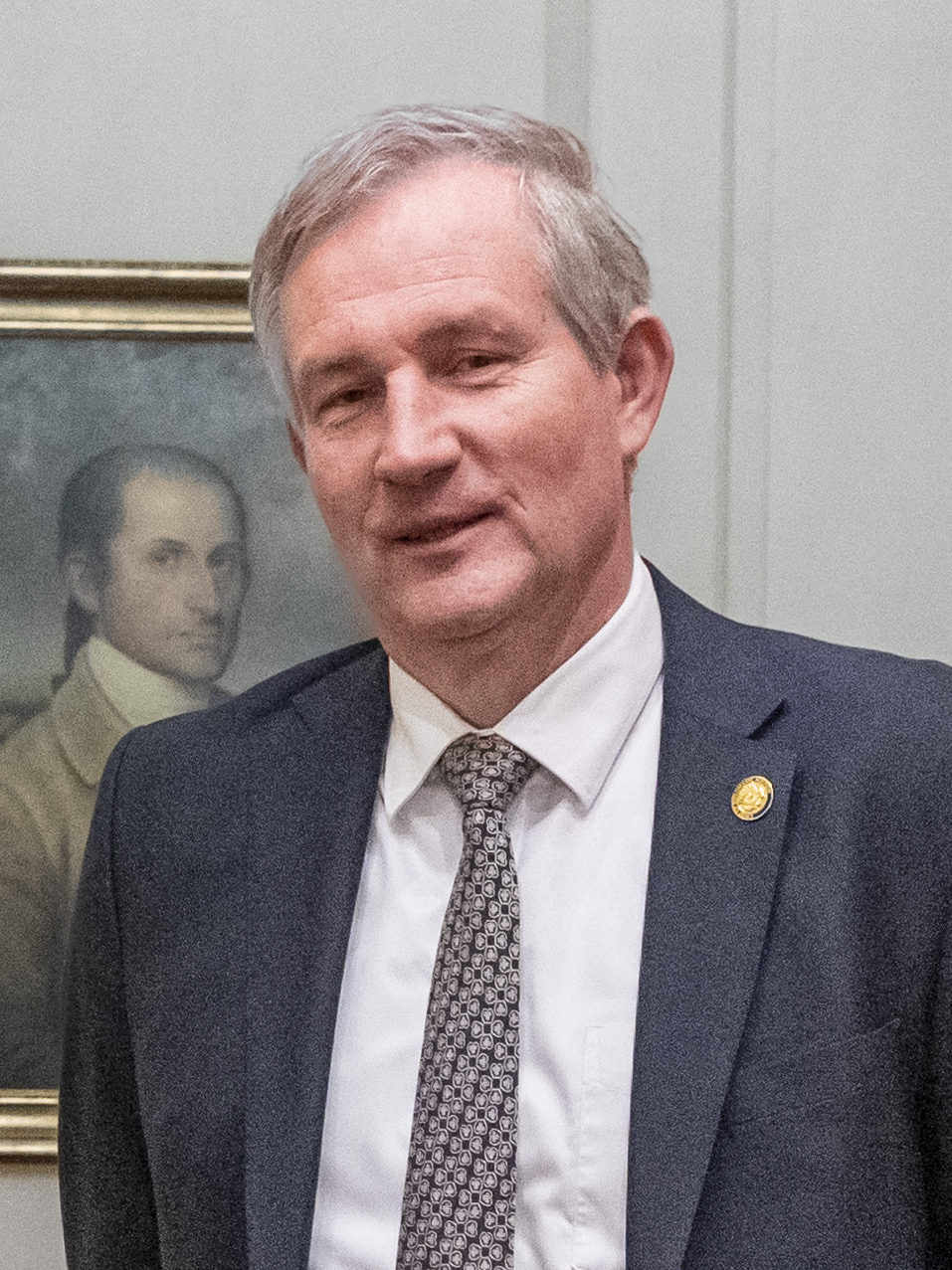
- Bili in 2023

Ambassador of France to the United States
- In office 14 February 2023 – 24 September 2026
- President: Emmanuel Macron
- Preceded by: Philippe Étienne
- Succeeded by: Aurélien Lechevallier

Ambassador of France to China
- In office 2019–2023
- President: Emmanuel Macron
- Preceded by: Jean-Maurice Ripert
- Succeeded by: Bertrand Lortholary

Director General for Global Affairs
- In office 2017–2019

Ambassador of France to Brazil
- In office 2015–2017
- President: François Hollande
- Preceded by: Denis Pietton
- Succeeded by: Michel Miraillet

Ambassador of France to Turkey
- In office 2011–2015
- President: Nicolas Sarkozy; François Hollande
- Preceded by: Bernard Émié
- Succeeded by: Charles Fries

Ambassador of France to Thailand
- In office 2007–2009
- President: Nicolas Sarkozy
- Preceded by: Laurent Aublin
- Succeeded by: Gildas Le Lidec

Personal details
- Born: Laurent Henri Bili; 12 August 1961 (age 65) Trier, West Germany
- Education: Sciences Po; Panthéon-Sorbonne University; École nationale d'administration
- Occupation: Diplomat

Laurent Henri Bili (French pronunciation: [lɔʁɑ̃ bili]; born 12 August 1961) is a French diplomat who has previously served as the ambassador to France to the United States, China, Brazil, Turkey and Thailand. He has also served as the director general for global affairs for the Ministry for Europe and Foreign Affairs.

== Biography ==
He was born in 1961 in Trier, West Germany, where his father was stationed as a soldier, because of his fathers postings he changed locations frequently, only beginning to live in mainland France at the age of ten.

=== Education ===
Bili attended Michelet High school in Vanves. He got a master's degree in history and political science from the Panthéon-Sorbonne University in 1984, later graduating from Sciences Po. He attended École nationale d'administration from 1989 to 1991, when he also worked as a history and geography teacher. He speaks many languages including English, French, Turkish, Portuguese, Spanish and Thai as well as some German, Indonesian and Dutch.

=== Career ===
After working in education and graduating from École nationale d'administration he chose a diplomatic career and joined the Ministry for Europe and Foreign Affairs, where he was initially assigned as the director of strategic affairs and disarmament from 1991 to 1993, before becoming deputy diplomatic advisor to the minister of state and minister of defence from 1993 to 1995. He also served as the first secretary in Ankara from 1995 to 1998, later being appointed deputy permanent representative to the Permanent Representation of France to the Western European Union in Brussels.

From 2002 to 2007 he was an advisor of the diplomatic unit under the presidency of Jacques Chirac. He was first appointed ambassador to Thailand in 2007, before serving as director of the civil and military cabinet under the then Minister of Defence Hervé Morin. He was appointed ambassador to Turkey in 2011, Brazil in 2015 and China in 2019. He became the director general for global affairs for the Agency for French Education Abroad from 2017 to 2019. He was appointed as ambassador to China in 2019 and was the ambassador to the United States from 2023 to 2026.

== Honorary distinctions ==
- (France) Knight of the Legion of Honour
- (France) Honour medal of Foreign Affairs (silver)
- (Thailand) Knight Grand Cross of the Most Exalted Order of the White Elephant
