= Emmanuel Jacquin de Margerie =

French ambassador & author (1924–1991)

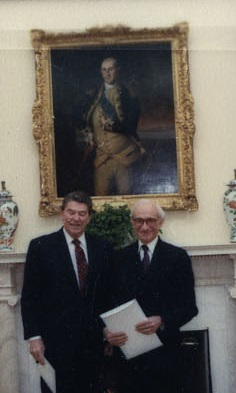
- S.E. Emmanuel Jacquin de Margerie at the Oval Office in 1985

French Ambassador to the United States
- In office 1984–1989
- President: François Mitterrand
- Preceded by: Bernard Vernier-Palliez
- Succeeded by: Jacques Andreani

French Ambassador to the UK
- In office 1981–1984
- Preceded by: Jean Sauvagnargues
- Succeeded by: Jacques Viot

Personal details
- Born: 25 December 1924 Paris
- Died: 2 December 1991 (aged 66) Paris
- Spouse: Hélène née Hottinguer
- Relations: Don Riccardo Pignatelli della Leonessa (brother-in-law)
- Children: 1 son, 1 dau
- Education: Sciences-Po, ÉNA
- Profession: Diplomat

Emmanuel Jacquin de Margerie (December 25, 1924 – December 2, 1991) was an Ambassador of France, author and promoter of the Arts.

== Career ==
The son of Roland de Margerie, French Ambassador to Spain, the Holy See and Germany, grandson of Pierre de Margerie, ambassador to Belgium and Germany and cousin of the geologist, Emmanuel de Margerie, he studied at the universities of Aurore in Shangaï and the Sorbonne, graduating with degrees from Sciences Po and ENA.

De Margerie joined the Quai d'Orsay, serving as Head of European Affairs, before postings as:

- Ambassador to Spain, from 1977 to 1981;
- Ambassador to the United Kingdom, from 1981 to 1984;
- Ambassador to the United States, from 1984 to 1989.

As founding director of Musées de France, he helped in the creation of the Musée d'Orsay. He also served as chairman of Christie's in Europe and president of World Monuments Fund (France) until his death in 1991.

== Honours ==
- Officer, Légion d'honneur
- Commander, Ordre national du Mérite
- Gran Cruz, Order of Isabella the Catholic
- Knight, Sovereign Military Order of Malta
- Cross, pro Merito Melitensi.

== See also ==
- Jacquin de Margerie family
