= François Bujon de l'Estang =

French diplomat (born 1940)

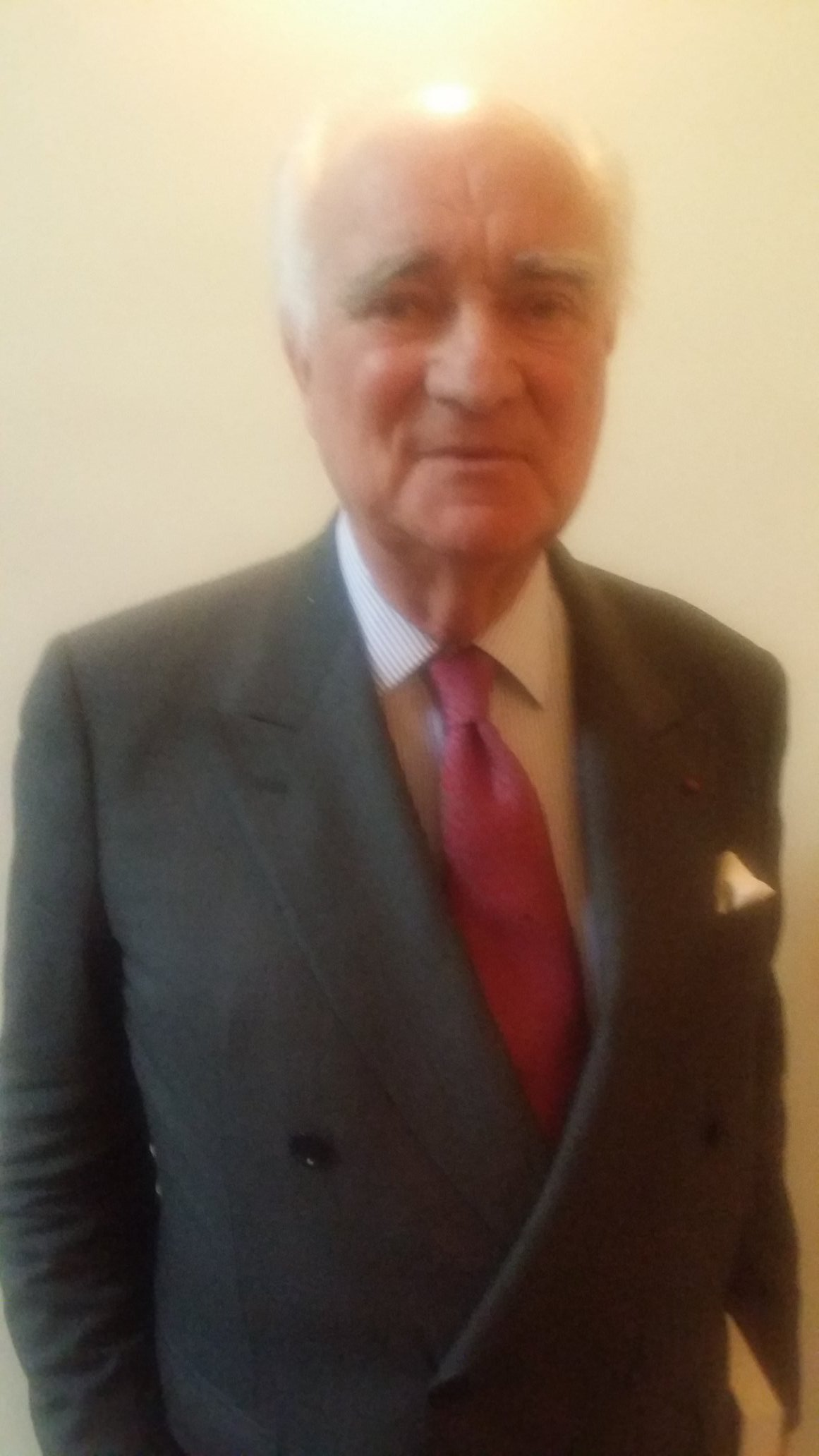
- François Bujon de l'Estang

Ambassador of France to the United States
- In office 1995–2002
- President: Jacques Chirac
- Preceded by: Jacques Andreani
- Succeeded by: Jean-David Levitte

Ambassador of France to Canada
- In office 1989–1991
- President: François Mitterrand

Personal details
- Born: 21 August 1940 (age 86) Neuilly-sur-Seine, France
- Education: Sciences Po, ÉNA; Harvard Business School

François Bujon de l'Estang (born August 21, 1940) is a French diplomat who served as the Ambassador of the French Republic to the United States from 1995 until 2002.

== Early life and education ==
Bujon de l'Estang graduated from Sciences Po, ENA, and the Harvard School of Business Administration.

== Career ==
Bujon de l'Estang was special assistant to President Charles de Gaulle from 1967 to 1969. He later served as diplomatic advisor to Prime Minister Jacques Chirac from 1986 to 1988.

Bujon de l'Estang was president and CEO of the US subsidiary of Cogema from 1982 to 1986, president and CEO of SFIM, from 1992 to 1993, and chairman of Citigroup, France.

== Other activities ==
- Trilateral Commission, Member of the European Group
