= List of ambassadors of France to the United States =

France's Ambassador to the United States of America
- Coat of Arms of French Republic

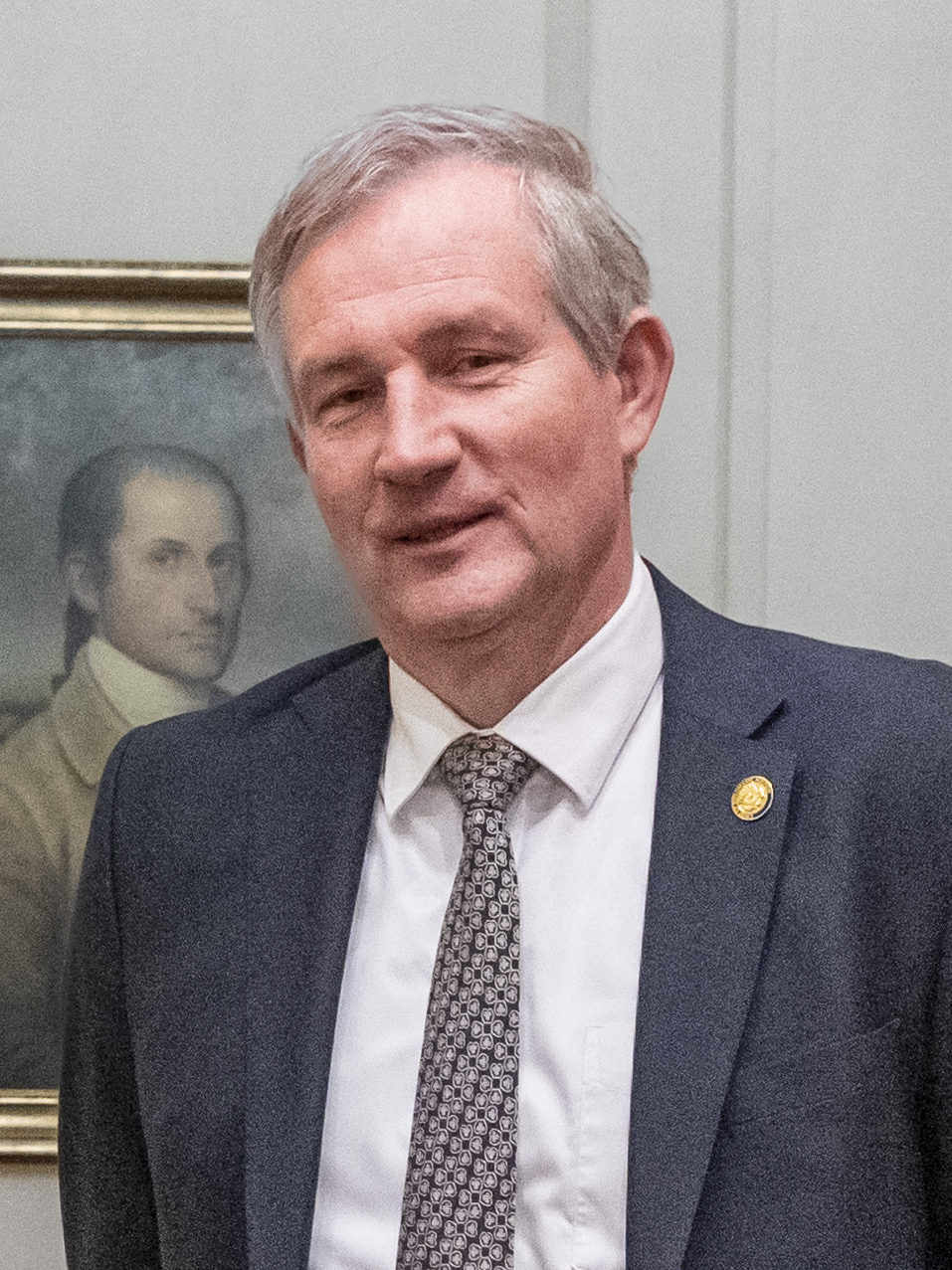
- Incumbent; Laurent Bili since 14 February 2023
- Ministry for Europe and Foreign Affairs; French Embassy, Washington D.C.
- Style: His Excellency
- Residence: French Ambassador's Residence in Washington, D.C.
- Inaugural holder: Conrad-Alexandre Gérard
- Formation: 1778
- Website: French Embassy – Washington

The French ambassador to the United States is the diplomatic representation of the French Republic to the United States. They reside in Washington, D.C. The current ambassador is Laurent Bili.

== Heads of mission ==
=== Ancien Regime (before 1792) ===
Image	From	Until	Ambassadors
	1778	1779	Conrad-Alexandre Gérard
	1779	1784	Anne-César, Chevalier de la Luzerne
	1784	1785	François Barbé-Marbois (Note: As chargé d'affaires ad interim.)
	1785	1787	Louis-Guillaume Otto (Note: As chargé d'affaires ad interim.)
	1787	1789	Elénor-François-Elie, Comte de Moustier
	1791	1793	Chevalier Jean Baptiste Ternant

=== First French Republic ===
Image	From	Until	Ambassadors
	1793	1794	Edmond-Charles Genêt
	1794	1795	Jean Antoine Joseph Fauchet
	1795	1796	Pierre Auguste Adet
	1796	1800	Michel Ange Bernard Mangourit
	1800	1800	Joseph Bonaparte (Note: Minister Plenipotentiary, Treaty of Mortefontaine.)
			Charles Pierre Claret de Fleurieu (Note: Minister Plenipotentiary, Treaty of Mortefontaine.)
			Pierre Louis Roederer (Note: Minister Plenipotentiary, Treaty of Mortefontaine.)
	1801	1804	Louis-André Pichon (Note: As chargé d'affaires ad interim.)

=== First French Empire (1804–15) ===
Image	From	Until	Ambassadors
	1804	1804	Felix Beaujour
	1804	1811	General Louis Marie Turreau of Garambouville
	1811	1815	Louis Barbe Charles Sérurier

=== Kingdom of France (1815–48) ===
Image	From	Until	Ambassadors
	1815	1821	Jean-Guillaume, baron Hyde de Neuville
	1821	1824	Jean-Baptiste Pétry (Note: As chargé d'affaires ad interim.)
	1824	1830	Joseph Alexandre Jacques Durant de Mareuil
	1830	1831	Jean Baptiste Gaspard Roux de Rochelle
	1831	1835	Louis Barbe Charles Sérurier
	1835	1837	Alphonse Pageot (Note: As chargé d'affaires ad interim.)
	1837	1838	Charles Edward Pontois
	1838	1841	Alphonse Pageot (Note: As chargé d'affaires ad interim.)
	1841	1846	Adolphe Fourier de Bacourt
	1843	1849	Alphonse Pageot (Note: On behalf of the July Monarchy))

=== Second French Republic (1848–52) ===
Image	From	Until	Ambassadors
	1848	1849	Guillaume-Tell de La Vallée Poussin (Note: On behalf of the French Second Republic.)
	1849	1850	Charles Alphonse de Sain de Bois-le-Comte
	1851	1860	Count Eugène de Sartiges

=== Second French Empire (1852–70) ===
Image	From	Until	Ambassadors
	1851	1860	Count Eugène de Sartiges
	1860	1864	Henri Mercier
	1864	1866	Charles-François-Frédéric, marquis de Montholon-Sémonville
	1866	1870	Jules Berthemy
	1870	1870	Lucien-Anatole Prévost-Paradol
	1870	1870	Jules Berthemy

=== Third French Republic (1870–1940) ===
Image	From	Until	Ambassadors
	1870	1870	Jules Treillard
	1871	1871	Henry de Bellonnet (Note: As chargé d'affaires ad interim.)
	1872	1873	Emmanuel Henri Victurnien de Noailles
	1873	1877	Amédée Bartholdi
	1877	1882	Georges Maxime Outrey
	1882	1891	Théodore Roustan
	1891	1897	Jules Patenôtre des Noyers
	1897	1902	Jules Cambon
	1902	1924	Jean Jules Jusserand
	1924	1925	Emile Daeschner
	1925	1926	Henry Bérenger
	1926	1933	Paul Claudel
	1933	1937	André Lefebvre de La Boulaye
	1937	1938	Georges Bonnet
	1938	1940	René Doynel de Saint-Quentin
	1940	1942	Gaston Henry-Haye
	1941	1942	Adrien Tixier (Note: Delegate of the French Committee of National Liberation.)
	1943	1943	Henri Hoppenot (Note: Delegate of the French Committee of National Liberation.)
	1944	1954	Henri Bonnet

=== Fourth French Republic (1946–58) ===
Image	From	Until	Ambassadors
	1944	1954	Henri Bonnet
	1954	1956	Maurice Couve de Murville
	1956	1965	Hervé Alphand

=== Fifth French Republic (1958–2025) ===
Image	From	Until	Ambassadors	President of France
	1956	1965	Hervé Alphand	Charles de Gaulle
	1965	1972	Charles Lucet	Charles de Gaulle] Georges Pompidou
	1972	1977	Jacques Kosciusco-Morizet	Georges Pompidou; Valéry Giscard d'Estaing
	1977	1981	François Lefebvre de Laboulaye	Valéry Giscard d'Estaing
	1981	1984	Bernard Vernier-Palliez	François Mitterrand
	1984	1989	Emmanuel Jacquin de Margerie	François Mitterrand
	1989	1995	Jacques Andreani	Jacques Chirac
	1995	2002	François Bujon de l'Estang	Jacques Chirac
	2002	2007	Jean-David Levitte	Jacques Chirac
	2007	2010	Pierre Vimont	Nicolas Sarkozy
	2011	2014	François Delattre	Nicolas Sarkozy; François Hollande
	2014	2019	Gérard Araud	François Hollande; Emmanuel Macron
	2019	2023	Philippe Étienne	Emmanuel Macron
	2023	2025	Laurent Bili	Emmanuel Macron

== See also ==
- List of ambassadors of the United States to France
