= Hubert Guerin =

French diplomat and military officer

Quirin Marie Hubert Guerin (25 January 1896 – 17 December 1986) was a French diplomat and military officer. He served as an ambassador to Canada (1949–1955), Brazil (1946–1949) and the Netherlands (1945–1946), and represented the exiled French Committee of National Liberation during World War II.

== Early career ==
Before entering France's diplomatic corps, Guerin served in the French Army in World War I. He was awarded the Croix de Guerre for his service and shortly after the war was appointed as a Chevalier of the Legion of Honour. After the war he joined the diplomatic service where he was promoted through the ranks until, in 1943, he joined the exiled anti-Nazi French Committee of National Liberation in Algiers, led by Charles de Gaulle. In 1944, he was appointed as the Committee's representative to the Holy See. According to historian Peter C. Kent, the Vatican's receipt of Guerin as an envoy at the time of the Allied landings in France marked "a striking deviation from traditional Vatican practice which would not normally give official recognition to wartime changes of territory and government".

== Career as an ambassador ==
Guerin was appointed as France's ambassador to the Netherlands in 1945. In 1946, he was appointed to Brazil. During his tenure in Rio de Janeiro, he was made a Commandeur of the Legion of Honour. In 1949, he was appointed as France's ambassador to Canada, a position which he held until his retirement in 1955. At the time of Guerin's departure, he was the longest serving diplomat in Ottawa, entitling him to the post of Dean of the diplomatic corps. He was given the Keys to the city of Ottawa.
