= Daniel Jouanneau =

French diplomat (born 1946)

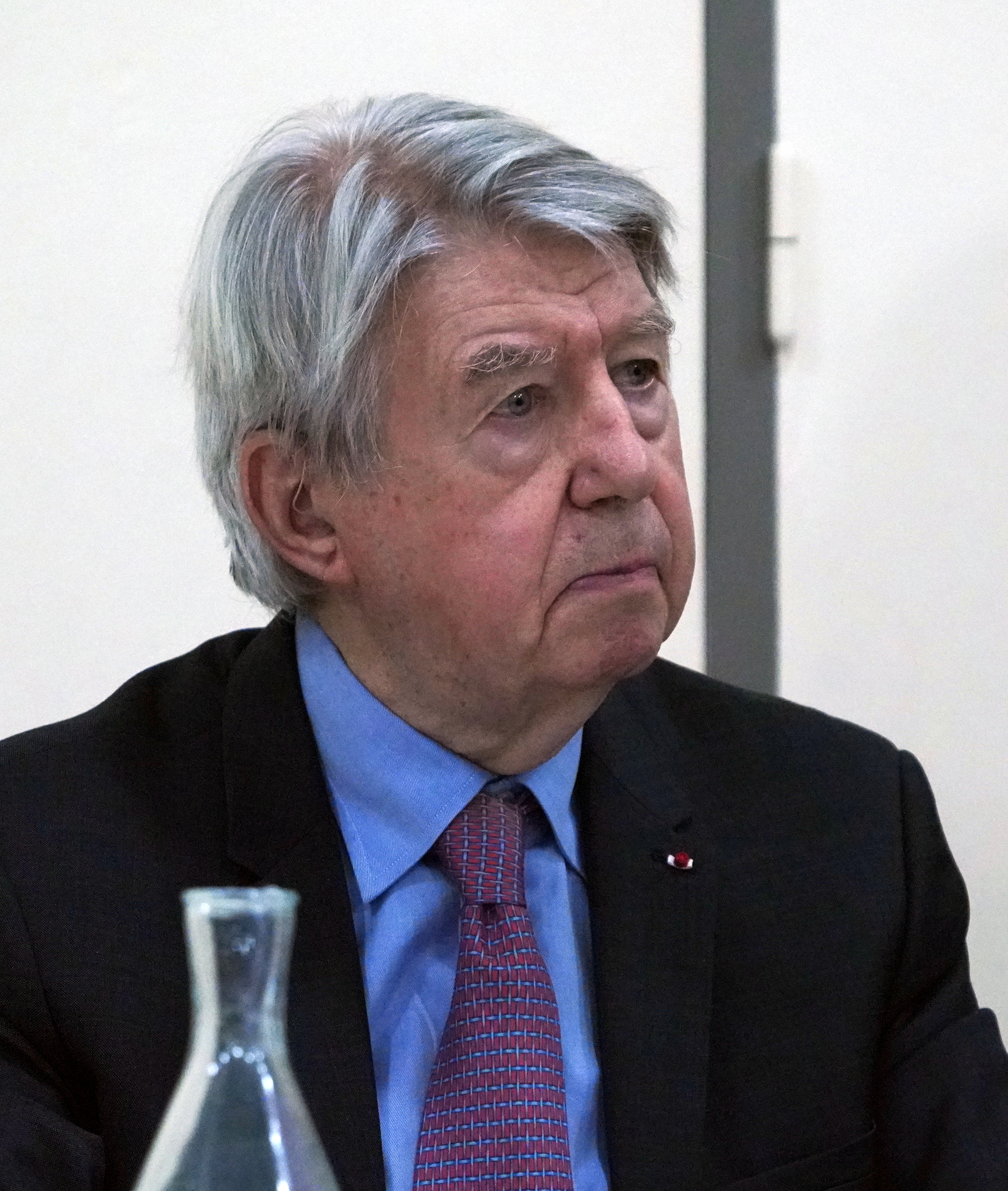

Daniel Jouanneau (born September 15, 1946) is a French diplomat.

== Education ==
Jouanneau completed his secondary education at the Lycée Ronsard in his hometown. He then studied at Sciences Po and the École Nationale d'Administration.

== Career ==
Jouanneau joined the French Ministry of Foreign Affairs in 1971 and held a variety of positions at home and abroad. While working at the Ministry in Paris, Jouanneau mostly worked on European matters (legal department, Europe directorate, economic department). He was also chief of protocol in the last two years of president François Mitterrand's administration (1993-1995) and the first two years of Jacques Chirac's presidency (1995-1997) . He also served as Inspector General of Foreign Affairs (1999-2004). Abroad, he was press secretary at the French embassy in Cairo, consul general in Salisbury and chargé d'affaires in Zimbabwe, counsellor for cultural affairs and cooperation in Conakry and Consul General in Quebec City. As an ambassador, Daniel Jouanneau served in Mozambique (with concurrent accreditation in Lesotho and Swaziland), Lebanon (1997-1999), Canada (2004-2008) and Pakistan (2008-2011).

Following his diplomatic career, Jouanneau joined the Cour des comptes as conseiller maître en service extraordinaire. He published books on GATT, WTO, Zimbabwe and Mozambique.

When leaving the public service, Daniel Jouanneau created DJ Conseil, which offers assistance to French companies for their international operations, and to foreign firms on the French market.
