= Kareen Rispal =

French diplomat

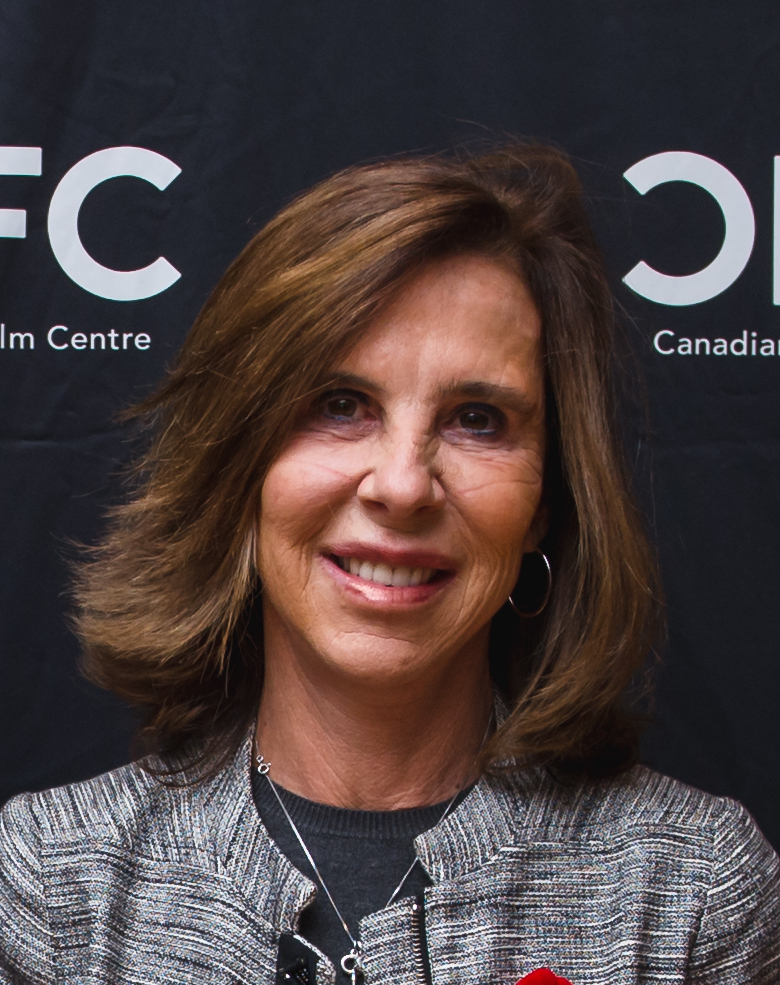

Kareen Géraldine Rispal is a French diplomat and the current ambassador representing France in Spain since the 13th of January 2025, before being attributed this position, she hold the position of Inspector General of Foreign Affairs from March 2022 to December 2024.

Previously Ambassador of France to Canada between 2017 and 2022, she was the 28th French Ambassador to Canada and the first female Ambassador to North America.

In 2022, she received the Femm'ENA prize.

== Education ==
Kareen Rispal holds a master's degree in public law. During her studies she joined the Institute of Political Studies in Paris. Upon obtaining her IEP diploma, Kareen Rispal entered the National School of Administration.

== Career ==
She joined the French Ministry of Foreign Affairs in 1986. Kareen Rispal began her career as a technical advisor in the cabinet of Bernard Kouchner, then Minister of Health and Humanitarian Action (1991-1993). She was then Head of the External Relations Sector at the General Secretariat of the Interministerial Committee for European Economic Cooperation Issues, then Project Manager for European issues at the Center for Analysis and Forecasting (CAP).

In 1997, she was appointed Deputy Director of Community Law and International Economic Law in the Department of Legal Affairs of the Ministry of Foreign Affairs from 1997 to 2000, then she was appointed First Counselor at the French Embassy in London.

In 2002, Noëlle Lenoir, Minister Delegate for European Affairs, chose her to lead her cabinet.

Kareen Rispal will take a break from her career in public administration and diplomacy to turn to the private sector for 3 years. She took the position of Director of Sustainable Development and Public Affairs within the Lafarge group from 2011 to 2014.

In 2014, she returned to public administration and became director of the Americas and the Caribbean within the Ministry of Foreign Affairs. She is also appointed Senior Equal Rights Official.

In 2017, she was named French Ambassador to Canada. She will hold this position until March 2022. She actively participates in the establishment of the G7 and the signing of collaboration agreements between France and Canada.

In March 2022, a few days before the outbreak of the Ukrainian conflict, she was appointed by decree, Inspector General of Foreign Affairs. Kareen Rispal is confronted as soon as she arrives at the post of Inspector General of Foreign Affairs, with the Ukrainian conflict.

== Honours ==
- On 26 September 2016, Rispal was awarded the Plaque rank of the Order of the Aztec Eagle by the then president of Mexico, Enrique Peña Nieto.
