= VoyagerMoinsCher.com =

French price comparison website

- Company type: Public
- Website type: Travel search engine/fare, availability and rate aggregator
- Available in: French
- Founded: 2000
- Headquarters: Paris, France
- Industry: Travel, Travel price comparison
- Website: www.voyagermoinscher.com www.billetmoinscher.com www.travelizer.co.uk

VoyagerMoinsCher.com is a French price comparison website specialised in finding travel deals. The site compares flights, holidays, tours, cruises, weekend breaks, hotels and holiday rentals in over 150 countries from France’s biggest travel operators. It gives internet users access to search engines, metasearch engines and promotional deals.

== History ==
VoyagerMoinsCher.com was created in 2000 by Alexandre Almajeanu, Pierre Brisset and Arnaud Barey. In March 2007, VoyagerMoinsCher.com launched BilletMoinsCher.com, a meta-search engine for comparing flights from different online travel agencies (OTA).

In July 2010, VoyagerMoinsCher.com launched a hotel meta-search engine which displays the hotel results from diverse OTAs on one single page with filters for refining the search.

Towards the end of 2007, the group Priceminister took over VoyagerMoinsCher.com. In June 2010, the group was bought by leading Japanese ecommerce group Rakuten.

Liligo Metasearch Technologies acquires VoyagerMoinsCher.com on the 30th of September 2015.

== See also ==
- MyLittleAdventure
