= Coriander (disambiguation) =

Coriander (Coriandrum sativum) is a cultivated plant native to Europe and used as a culinary herb.

Coriander may also refer to:

== Plants ==
- Eryngium foetidum, a Central and South American herb sometimes called Mexican coriander or long coriander
- Persicaria odorata, an Asian herb sometimes called Vietnamese coriander
- Porophyllum ruderale, a South American herb sometimes called Bolivian coriander

== Other uses ==
- Coriander, a character in Steambot Chronicles
- Coriander, a version of Netvibes
- Starfire (Koriand'r), DC Comics superhero
- Coriander Widetrack, a character in the Cars franchise

== See also ==
- Coreander
