= E-G8 Forum =

Public policy summit on the topic of the Internet

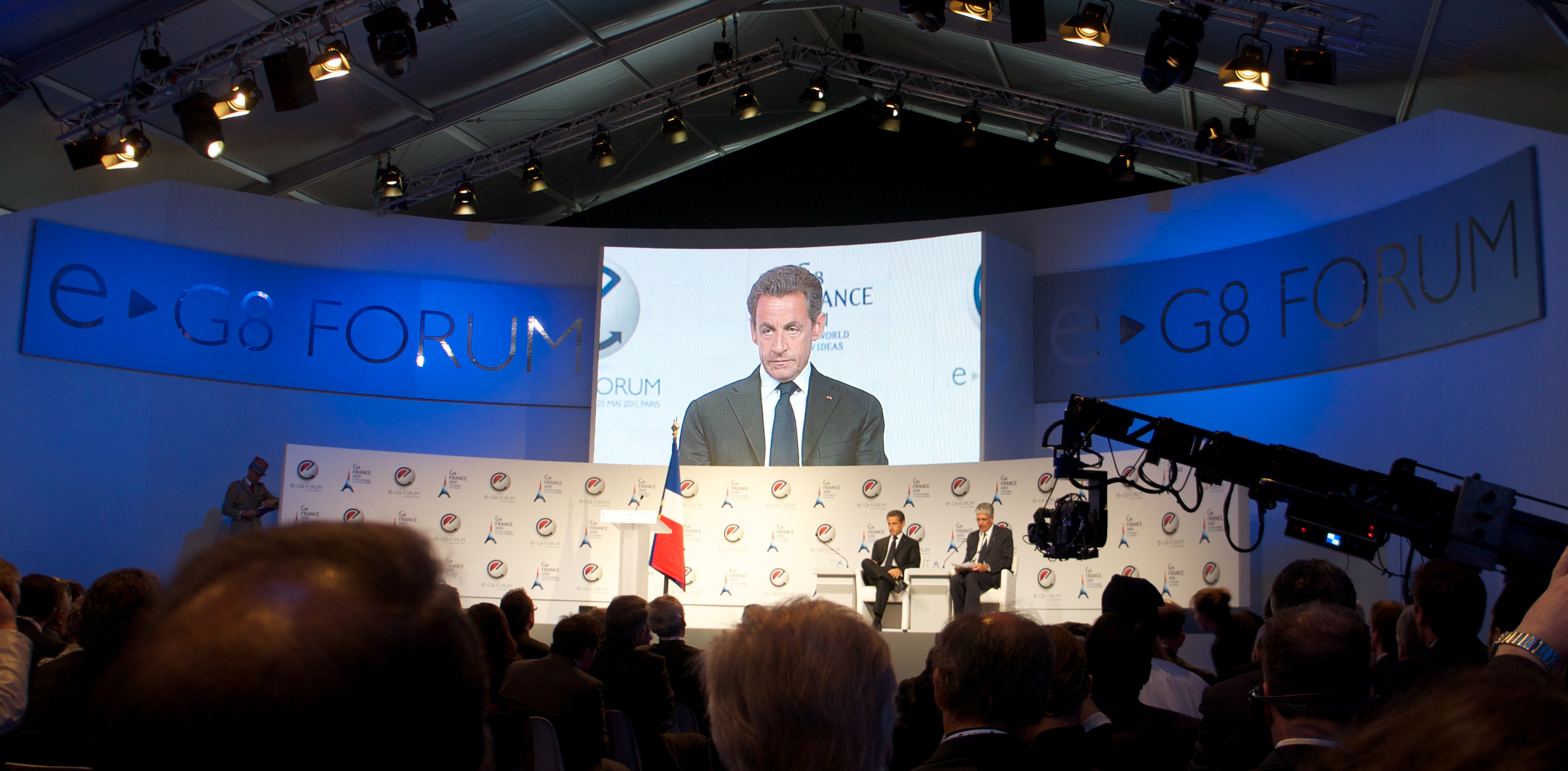
Sarkozy addresses the E-G8

The E-G8 Forum (or simply the eG8) was an invitation-only summit of leaders in government and industry focusing on the Internet in the context of global public policy. The event was put on by Publicis Groupe and was convened by French President Nicolas Sarkozy from May 24-25th 2011, prior to the 37th G8 summit, and was held at the Tuileries Garden in Paris.

== Origin ==
The idea for the event came up on a blog post by Tariq Krim in which the founder of Netvibes complained that France doesn't have its own CTO. The blog post was reposted by Arnaud Dassier and Loïc Le Meur, and read by the Elysée's technical counsellor Nicolas Princen, who then convinced Nicolas Sarkozy to take a step towards the French digital natives after the failure of Hadopi.

== Attendees ==
The conference, which was the first of its kind, was a meeting of international government figures and those in the global technology industry. It included participants such as Eric Schmidt from Google, Sheryl Sandberg and Mark Zuckerberg from Facebook, Jimmy Wales from the Wikimedia Foundation, French Minister of the Economy Christine Lagarde, Rupert Murdoch from News Corp, and was opened with a speech by Sarkozy. A few invitees, such as author Cory Doctorow, refused to attend in protest before it even began, and claimed the event was, more or less, a PR stunt financed by the advertising industry and Sarkozy's connections to Publicis Group.

== Content and reactions ==
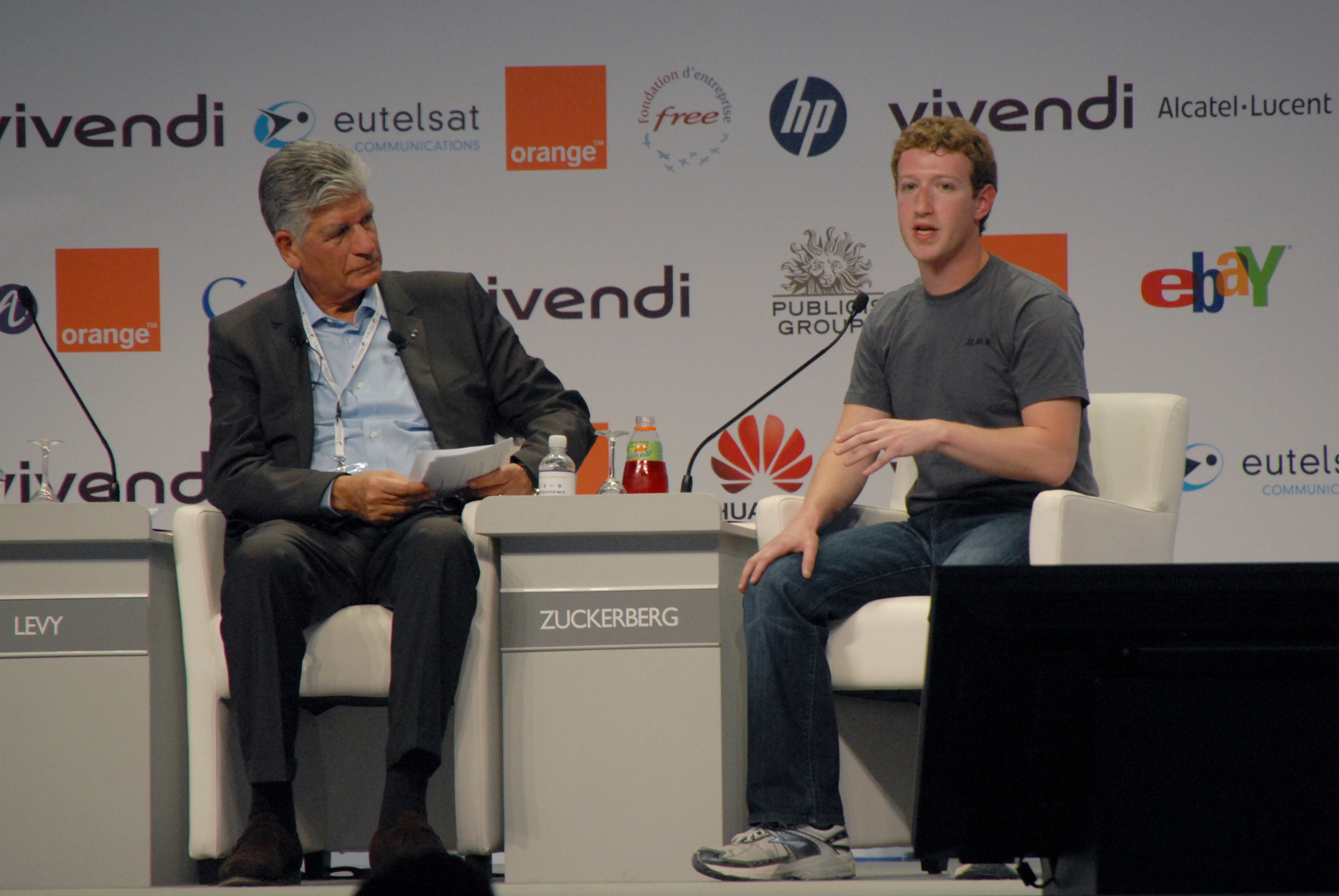
Zuckerberg closed the event

The discussion over the two-day meeting surfaced many tensions between technologists and policy makers. In general, Sarkozy led a camp pushing for further government regulation (such as HADOPI law in France) to protect minors, prevent or punish copyright infringement, and to encourage economic growth through electronic commerce. Participants such as John Perry Barlow, Yochai Benkler, Zuckerberg, and Schmidt spoke out during the event against tight regulatory control of the Internet. While the forum was publicized as a way for technology leaders to participate in the G8's thinking on Internet-related public policy, a copy of a communique from the G8 which was composed before the closing of the Forum was leaked to The New York Times.
