= Jacques Kosciusco-Morizet =

French diplomat

Jacques Kosciusko-Morizet

Mayor of Saint-Nom-la-Bretèche
- In office 1977–1994
- Succeeded by: René Chêne

Ambassador of France to the United States
- In office 1972–1977
- President: Georges Pompidou; Valéry Giscard d'Estaing
- Preceded by: Charles Lucet
- Succeeded by: François Lefebvre de Laboulaye

Personal details
- Born: 31 January 1913 Paris, France
- Died: 15 May 1994 (aged 81) Paris, France
- Relations: Nathalie Kosciusko-Morizet (granddaughter)
- Education: École normale supérieure
- Profession: Diplomat

Jacques Kosciusko-Morizet (or Kosciusco) (31 January 1913 – 15 May 1994) was a French university professor and diplomat. He served as the French Ambassador to the United States from 1972 to 1977.

== Biography ==
Born in Paris to a respected Polish family, Kosciusco earned a degree in ethics and sociology from the École normale supérieure and taught high school in Grenoble from 1941 to 1943. He fought in World War II and was captured by German forces. He escaped, joined the French Resistance, and participated in the defense of the city hall of Paris in 1944, for which he was decorated after the war.

Kosciusko served as bureaucrat in various French ministries before becoming a diplomat. He became Chief of Staff to the Secretary General of the Prefecture of Police and Assistant at the Faculty of Letters in Paris from 1944 to 1946. He was briefly a professor at Columbia University in 1946. He was made deputy director of the cabinet of Léon Blum in 1946, and then Chief of Staff (Civil) for President Vincent Auriol in 1947, a position he held until 1954. He also served Félix Houphouët-Boigny of Côte d'Ivoire from 1956 to 1957.

Kosciusko's international standing rose when he was France's delegate to the United Nations General Assembly from 1957 to 1962. He was ambassador to Congo (Léopoldville)/(Kinshasa) from 1963 to 1968, and was the French ambassador to NATO from 1969 to 1970. He was ambassador to the United Nations from 1970 to 1972, and French ambassador to the United States from 1972 to 1977. He retired from the diplomatic corps in 1978.

Afterwards Kosciusko became involved in local French politics. He was the national secretary for foreign relations of the Rally for the Republic party from 1983 to 1988, and was mayor of Saint-Nom-la-Bretèche from 1977 until his death in Paris in 1994. He was also a director of Christian Dior between 1981 and 1993 and chairman of the supervisory board of Louis Vuitton between 1989 and 1992.

== Family ==
He is the father of François Kosciusko-Morizet, Catherine Postel-Vinay, Jacques-Antoine Kosciusko-Morizet (or Jacques Kosciusko) and Martine de Beauregard. His granddaughter Nathalie Kosciusko-Morizet is a former Minister of Ecology and was involved politically for many years at different levels. His grandson Pierre Kosciusko-Morizet is a co-founder of Priceminister.
