= Populis =

International online publishing company

- Industry: Electronic publishing
- Predecessor: GoAdv
- Founded: July 1, 2004; 22 years ago in Rome, Italy
- Founder: Luca Ascani; Salvatore Esposito
- Defunct: 2016
- Headquarters: Italy
- Key people: Salvatore Esposito, CEO
- Revenue: €58 million (2010)

Populis, formerly known as GoAdv, was an online publishing company producing content for 550 websites and blogs across eight European languages. It "collapsed" and was put into liquidation in 2016.

The company was active in several different countries, including Ireland, Italy, UK, Germany, Netherlands, France, Spain, Sweden, US, Australia, Russia and Brazil. Co-founded by Luca Ascani, chairman of the company, and CEO Salvatore Esposito, Populis had offices in Rome, Dublin and Milan. Headquartered in Dublin, as of 2011 the company employed 58 staff. Its website brands included Excite Europe, Better Deals, Nanopublishing, Blogosfere and Blogo.

== Early history ==
GoAdv was launched in Rome on July 1, 2004 by Luca Ascani and Salvatore Esposito. In October 2010, GoAdv rebranded to Populis to reflect the company's increasing focus on the European production of multilingual online content.

== Management ==
Members of the Populis Board of Directors include co-founder and Chairman Luca Ascani, co-founder and CEO Salvatore Esposito and Bernard-Louis Roques at Truffle Capital. Luca Ascani has spoken at the eG8 Forum on issues facing start-ups in the current business climate. In 2000, he launched buycentral.it as an Italian subsidiary of a French shopping comparison site. The company was sold to the German group Lycos in 2004. In 2002, he launched ADVance SRL, subsequently selling it to Netbooster in 2007.

== Media Brands and Acquisitions ==
Populis has acquired several web portals. After adding Better Deals, a European network of shopping guides, to their network in February 2006, Excite Europe was acquired in October 2007. Nanopublishing was acquired in June 2009, followed by the acquisition of Blogosfere, Italy's largest blog network, in January 2010. Blogo was bought in January 2011.

== Revenues ==
From 2006 to 2010, Populis' revenues grew by an average of 43 percent annually, reaching revenues of 58 million euros in 2010. In June 2010, Populis announced its delisting from the Alternext of NYSE Euronext.
