= Exalead =

French software company

EXALEAD
- Type: Brand of Dassault Systèmes, S.A.
- Industry: Search based applications Information technology Information access Search Engine
- Founded: 2000; 26 years ago
- Defunct: 2014
- Fate: Dissolved
- Headquarters: Paris, France
- Products: EXALEAD CloudView, EXALEAD OneCall, EXALEAD OnePart
- Number of employees: 150
- Subsidiaries: United States, UK, Italy, Germany, and Benelux
- Website: www.3ds.com/products-services/exalead/overview/

EXALEAD /ɛɡˈzæliːd/ was a software company created in 2000 that provided search platforms and search-based applications (SBA) for consumer and business users. Headquartered in Paris, France, it was acquired by Dassault Systèmes in 2010 and integrated into subsidiary NETVIBES in 2022.

== Exalabs ==
The CloudView product is also the platform for Exalead's public Web search engine, which was designed to apply semantic processing and faceted navigation to Web data volumes and usage. Exalead also operates an online laboratory which uses the Web as a medium for developing applied technologies for business.

Many of Exalabs projects are developed in conjunction with Exalead's partners in the Quaero project.

== History ==
Exalead was founded in 2000 by François Bourdoncle and Patrice Bertin (both of whom were involved in the development of the Alta Vista search engine), and began commercializing its products in 2005.

On 8 June 2010, Dassault Systèmes acquired Exalead for 135 million Euros. Exalead employed approximately 150 people in 2013. Since the acquisition, many startups have sprung from Exalead such as Dataiku founded by Florian Douetteau, former vice president and then CEO of Dataiku, a French analytics software editor.

Exalead has been integrated into NETVIBES, a Dassault Systèmes brand.

== See also ==
- List of search engines
- Search engine
