= Tariq Krim =

French entrepreneur (born 1972)

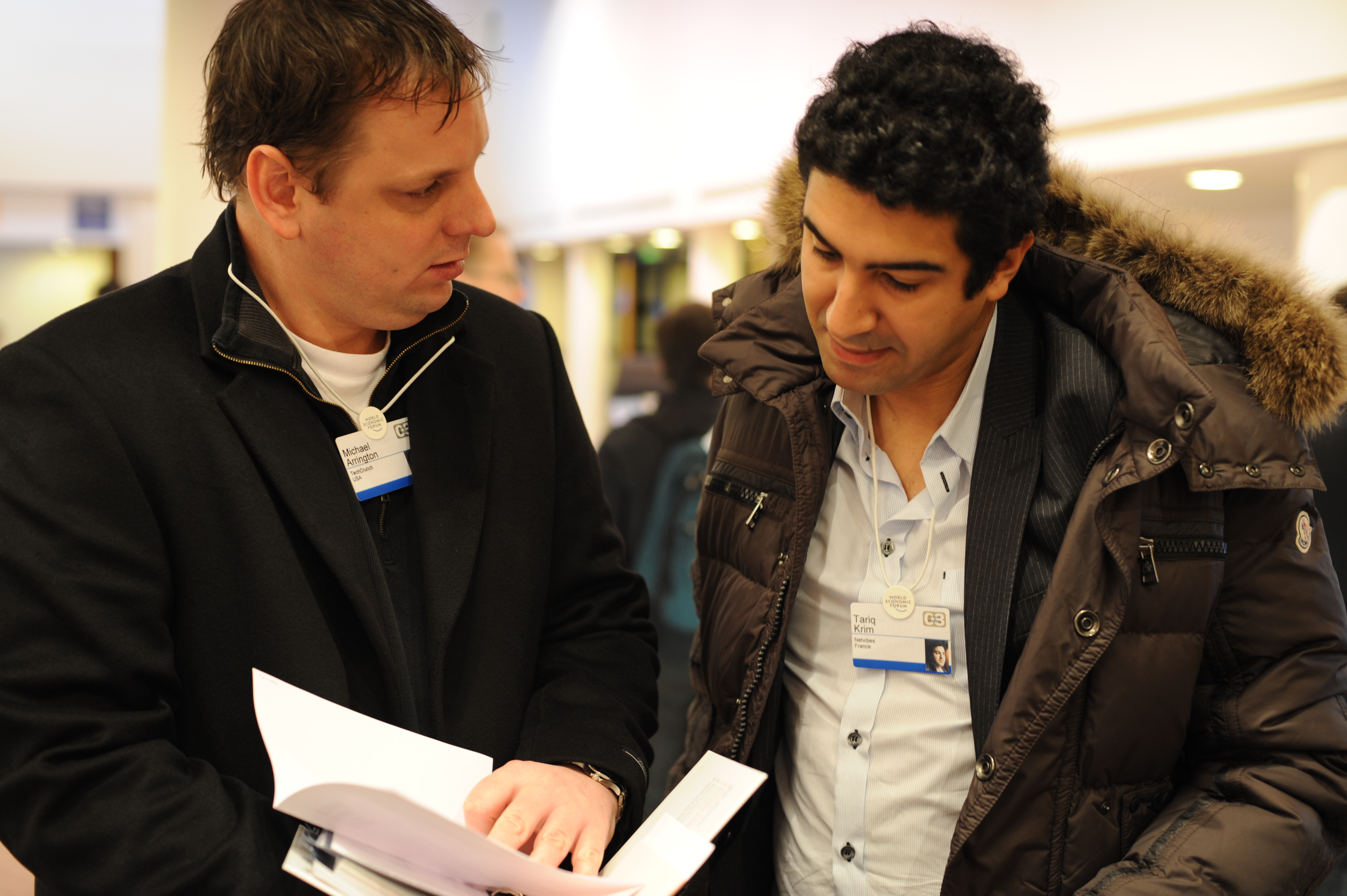
- Krim in 2007
- Born: 25 October 1972 (age 53); Paris
- Education: Graduate in physics post-graduate degree
- Alma mater: University of Paris VII; Ecole Nationale Superieure des Telecommunications
- Occupation: Entrepreneur

Tariq Krim (born 25 October 1972, in Paris) is a French entrepreneur, creator of Netvibes and the founder of Jolicloud, a personal cloud content computing platform and Joli OS, a free operating system based on the Jolicloud platform. In 2008, he was the first French national named by the MIT Technology Review as one of the top 35 innovators in the world under the age of 35. He was appointed Chevalier de l'Ordre des Arts et des Lettres (Knight of the French Order of Arts and Letters) by the French Minister of Culture in 2011.

== Early years ==
Tariq Krim spent his childhood in the historic area of Paris, Le Marais. His father was an economist and his mother a teacher. Passionate about computers from an early age (he was given his first computer at 10, and created his first Minitel server at 12 years old), Krim went on to study physics at the University of Paris VII and obtained his post-graduate degree from the Ecole Nationale Superieure des Telecommunications (ENST).

== Career ==
=== Journalism ===
In 1994, after meeting with Jean-Francois Bizot, Krim became a writer for Novamag and wrote articles about cyberculture. He continued his career in journalism for the financial daily La Tribune. First based in Paris, then in California (he opened the newspaper's Silicon Valley branch), Krim published various articles on the Internet industry.

=== Entrepreneurship ===
In 1999, Krim decided to move on from writing about Internet innovation. That year, he founded what would become L8Rmedia, a consulting and publishing company specializing in digital media. Its first branch was in San Francisco; he later expanded to Paris. Its main online publication, GenerationMP3 (formerly "MPTrois.com"), attracts 1.5 million readers per month. and pioneered the use of participatory journalism in France.

In 2005, Krim created Netvibes with Florent Frémont, a developer friend. The personalized dashboard publishing platform claims over 10 million users worldwide, half of whom are in the United States.

In 2008, Krim left as the head of the company to create Jolicloud in 2009, co-founded with Romain Huet, the company's CTO. Their vision was to combine cloud technology with a simple user interface. Krim first developed Joli OS, a free operating system, which enabled users to optimise low-cost devices or recycle older computers. In 2012, Jolicloud launched an HTML5-based cloud platform. Jolicloud is backed by $4.2 million in venture capital funding from Atomico Ventures, formed by Kazaa and Skype founders Niklas Zennström and Janus Friis, and Mangrove Capital Partners.

== Mentoring ==
In 2008, Krim co-founded ISAI, "the French tech entrepreneurs' fund", which provides seed capital for web and mobile technology startups. ISAI's co-founders are all members of France's digerati: Orianne Garcia, founder of Terrafemina.com; Pierre Kosciusko-Morizet, founder of PriceMinister; Ouriel Ohayon, founder of TechCrunch France and AppsFire; Geoffroy Roux de Bézieux, CEO of Virgin Mobile; and Stéphane Treppoz, Chairman of the Executive Board of Sarenza. This combined effort has helped launch websites such as co-voiturage.fr and InstantLuxe.com. Krim has said that he has a "passion for building highly disruptive new products".

== Net freedom ==
He advised Adami, a French civil society that allocates the rights of performers. In 2004 he published a study called "Peer-to-Peer, a New Business Model for Music", in which he cites another study by the French Directorate of Economic Forecasting and Analysis, which concluded that "no systematic correlation can be made between downloading and the state of the music industry".

== Thought leadership ==
Krim is a speaker at global technology and media conferences and summits. He regularly appears on mainstream media.

In 2008, he was awarded the Information Technology for Business Creation Prize by Telecom ParisTech and its engineering association (AIST). Krim is one of six French personalities to have been selected as a Young Global Leader (YGL) by the World Economic Forum.

Krim served on the Conseil national du numérique as a vice president from 2013 to 2016.
