= Le Nouvel Économiste =

French weekly financial and business magazine

- Categories: Business magazine
- Frequency: Weekly
- Founded: 1975; 51 years ago
- Company: Media Capital
- Country: France
- Based in: Paris
- Language: French
- Website: Le Nouvel Économiste

Le Nouvel Économiste (French pronunciation: [lə nuvɛl‿ekɔnɔmist]; lit. 'The New Economist') is a French language weekly financial and business magazine published in Paris, France.

The target audience of Le Nouvel Économiste include government officials, policy makers, CEOs, investors and high income earners. The center-right newspaper has forged partnerships with the Financial Times and The Economist. The weekly has offered an award of best economist of the year since 1993.

== History and profile ==
Le Nouvel Économiste resulted from the merger in 1975 of the titles Entreprise (controlled by Hachette) and Informations industrielles et commerciales (owned by Havas) under the management of Jacques Klein and then Daniel Jouve and Michel Tardieu, following the merger of the publishing groups Usine Participation and Compagnie française d'édition, which became Compagnie européenne de publications (CEP) . In 1978, CEP and Hachette each held half the capital of Le Nouvel Économiste. In December 1986, Hachette Filipacchi Publications increased its stake to 55%.

During the first 10 years, the title's advertising revenues ‘were among the highest in the French economic and financial press ’. The 1990s and early 2000s were marked by a degree of capital instability due to repeated losses. A new format was introduced in September 2003, with the title moving ‘from a fortnightly format on glossy paper to a weekly format on newsprint’.

After the change of format in September 2003, the business weekly changed ownership once again. Jacob Abbou sold 93% of the capital to a new structure called ‘Financière Nouvel Economiste’. This is 42% owned by Jacques Abergel (former head of Giraudy, Europe 1 and BFM), 13% by Henri Nijdam and 45% by Jean-Bernard Fetoux. These three individuals invested nearly 500,000 euros to buy the shares, the brand, take over part of the debt and inject fresh money. In 2005, an attempt to merge with Challenges magazine (part of the Le Nouvel Observateur group) failed. In 2016, Bruno Ledoux acquired a stake in the company, which was in difficulty at the time, alongside other entrepreneurs and professionals from the world of finance and the media, such as Michèle Cotta, Henri de Bodinat, Gonzagues de Blignières, Pierre Kosciusko-Morizet, Henri Nijdam, Jean-François Hénin, Alexandre Almajeanu, Jean-René Tancrède, Stéphane Fouks, Ming-Po Cai, Anthony Ginter, Lionel Zinsou, Christophe Aulnette and Henri de Maublanc. Le Nouvel Économiste was established in 1975. The magazine was owned by the Hachette S.A until 2002 when it was acquired by the Jacob Abbou group.

The magazine is published on a weekly basis and provides financial news as well as comprehensive reports on company relations and activities. It also features book reviews. Its headquarters is in Paris and is published in orange color.

== Team ==
Directeur de la publication : Henri J. Nijdam.

Directeur Général : Alexandre Almajeanu

Rédaction en chef : Jean-Michel Lamy, Edouard Laugier & Philippe Plassart.

Coordination dossiers : Marie-Line Lybrecht

Secrétariat de rédaction : Aurélie Percheron

Chroniqueurs : Ardavan Amir-Aslani, Alain Bauer, Philippe Barret, Michèle Cotta, Jean-Marc Daniel, Philippe Delmas, François Ecalle, Pascal Lorot, Paul-Henri Moinet, Bertrand Jacquillat, Olivier Clodong, Xavier Raufer, Marie-Madeleine Rigopoulos, Charly Salkazanov, Gaël Tchakaloff, Frédéric Thiriez, Anne Toulouse, Roxana Azimi.

Grand Paris : Fabien Humbert, Anne Thiriet

Grandes Ecoles : Nicolas Chalon

Chef d'édition/production : Clément Guéraud.

Responsible marketing digital : Gustave Cozzolino
