= Nicolas Princen =

Nicolas Princen (born 1984 in Rennes, France), was the technical advisor of French President Nicolas Sarkozy from 2007 to 2012. He was the manager of Nicolas Sarkozy's online campaign during the 2012 French presidential election.

== Education ==
From 2001 to 2003, Nicolas Princen took the preparatory class Hypokhâgne/Khâgne BL Arts and Social Sciences at Lycée Henri IV. From 2003 to 2006, he pursued a Masters in political philosophy at the École Normale Supérieure (Ulm). In 2007, he graduated from HEC Paris with a major in entrepreneurship. During his studies, he did internships as a reporter to the editorial board of Le Figaro and as project manager at Euro RSCG New York.

== Career ==
=== Presidential Campaign 2007 ===
In 2007, Nicolas Princen joined the digital campaign team of Nicolas Sarkozy for the presidential elections of 2007 as editor in chief of the Sarkozy.fr website. He handled the presence of the candidate through video-sharing sites, blogs and social networks, and produced funny and offbeat supportive videos.

=== Cabinet of the Elysée ===
Following the election of Nicolas Sarkozy in 2007, Nicolas Princen joined the presidential Cabinet as assistant manager to Spokesman David Martinon.

In 2008 he was appointed reporter of the General State of the Press, in the committee “the press facing the shock of the internet” headed by Bruno Patino, which led to the creation of the status of online news editor and to the release of the same stat aid the printed press gets. In March 2008, Nicolas Princen became in charge of monitoring new Web technologies at the Communications department of the Elysée. His appointment earned him the nickname "the eye of Sarkozy on the Web" from bloggers.

In 2009, Nicolas Princen became the project manager for the Website of the Elysée and created the Web department within the Communications department of the Elysée. In 2010, the new version of elysee.fr site was launched.

In 2011, Nicolas Princen was appointed Technical Advisor of the presidential cabinet, in charge of New Media and Digital Economy. At the request of Nicolas Sarkozy, he led the creation of the Conseil national du numérique (National digital council), a group of business leaders and entrepreneurs that advise the government on digital-related issues. The same year, to prepare for the G8/G20 held in Deauville, Nicolas Princen led the organization of the e-G8 Forum, organized by Maurice Lévy, which gathered the major internet stakeholders in Paris.

=== Presidential campaign of 2012 ===
In March 2012, following Nicolas Sarkozy's candidacy to the French 2012 presidential elections, Nicolas Princen suspended his contract at the Elysée to join the candidate's campaign team as manager of the online campaign, and to elaborate on the candidate's program about digital and innovation issues.
