= 37th G8 summit =

2011 international leader meeting in France

- Official logo
- Host country: France
- Dates: 26–27 May 2011
- Cities: Deauville
- Venues: Centre International de Deauville
- Follows: 36th G8 summit
- Precedes: 38th G8 summit

The 37th G8 summit was held on 26–27 May 2011 in Deauville, France.

Previous G8 summits have been hosted by France in locations which include Rambouillet (1975); Versailles (1982); Grande Arche, Paris (1989); Lyon (1996); and Évian-les-Bains (2003).

== Overview ==
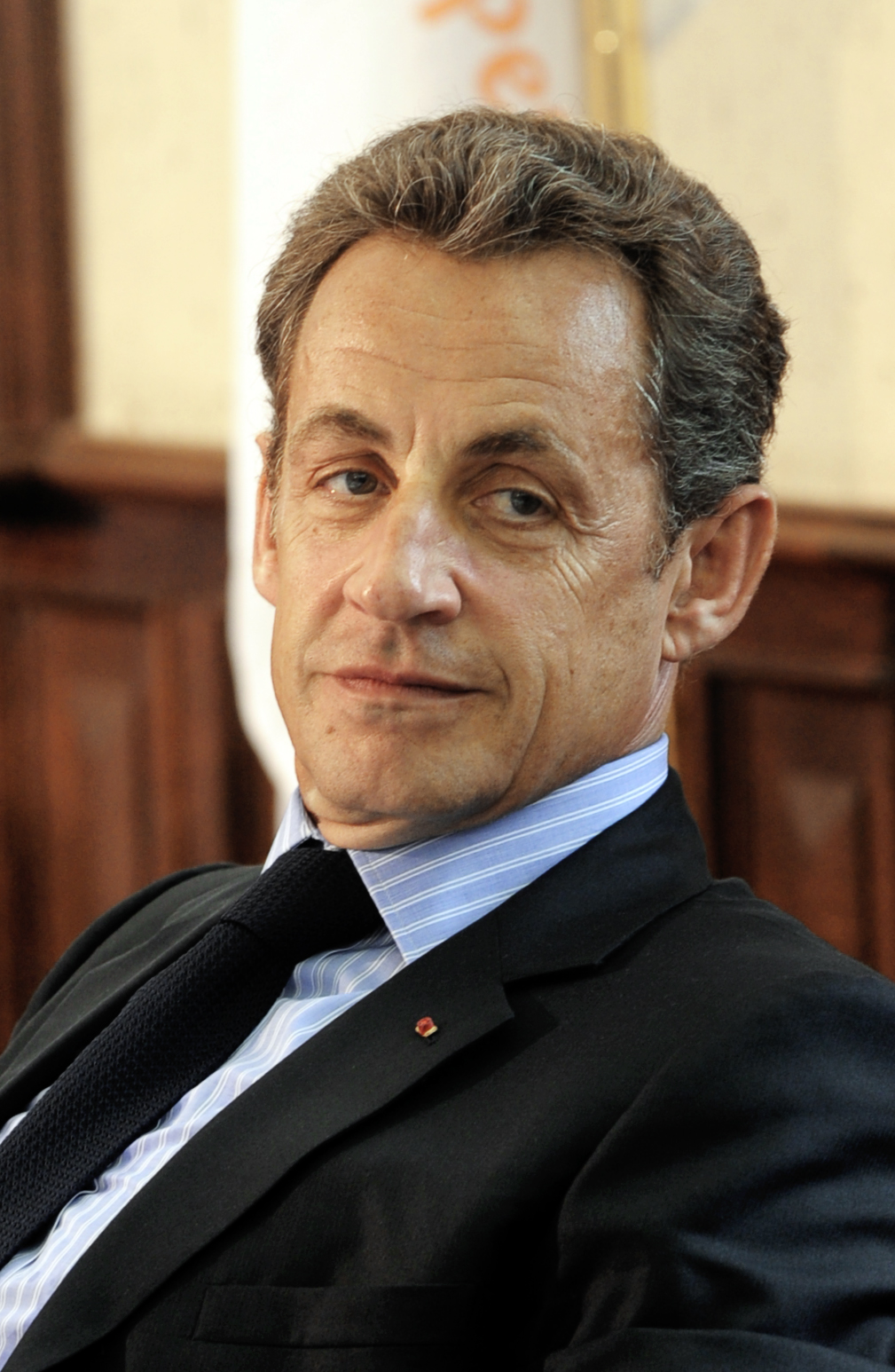
French President Nicolas Sarkozy was the host of the 37th G8 summit in Deauville, France.

The Group of Six (G6) was an unofficial forum which brought together the heads of the richest industrialized countries: France, Germany, Italy, Japan, the United Kingdom, and the United States starting in 1976. The Group of Seven (G7), meeting for the first time in 1979, was formed with the addition of Canada. Hence, The Group of Eight (G8), meeting for the first time in 1997, was formed with the addition of Russia. In addition, the President of the European Commission has been formally included in summits since 1981. The summits were not meant to be linked formally with wider international institutions; and in fact, a mild rebellion against the stiff formality of other international meetings was a part of the genesis of cooperation between France's president Valéry Giscard d'Estaing and West Germany's chancellor Helmut Schmidt as they conceived the initial summit of the Group of Six (G6) in 1975.

The G8 summits have inspired widespread debates, protests and demonstrations; and the two- or three-day event becomes more than the sum of its parts, elevating the participants, the issues and the venue as focal points for activist pressure.

The form and functions of the G8 were reevaluated as the G20 summits evolved into the premier forum for discussing, planning and monitoring international economic cooperation. The "new G8" is refocusing on the subjects of common interest to the G8 countries, including geopolitical and security issues.

The forum continues to be in a process of transformation.

== Leaders at the summit ==
The G8 is an unofficial annual forum for the leaders of Canada, the European Commission, France, Germany, Italy, Japan, Russia, the United Kingdom, and the United States.

The 37th G8 summit was the last summit for French President Nicolas Sarkozy, Italian Prime Minister Silvio Berlusconi, Japanese Prime Minister Naoto Kan and Dmitry Medvedev as President of Russia (Medvedev would return to the 38th G8 summit the following year as Prime Minister of Russia, leading Russian delegates in place for the newly elected President Vladimir Putin).

=== Participants ===
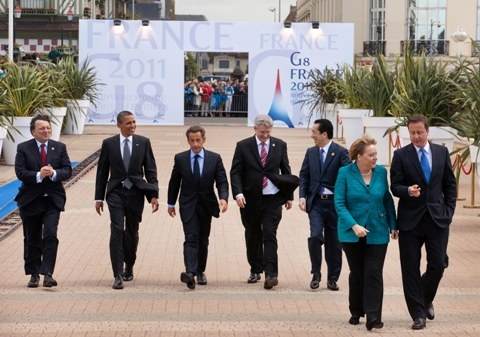
G8 leaders walking to the first working session at summit in Deauville. Left to right: European Commission President José Manuel Barroso; US President Barack Obama; French President Nicolas Sarkozy; Canadian Prime Minister Stephen Harper; Japanese Prime Minister Naoto Kan; German Chancellor Angela Merkel; and British Prime Minister David Cameron

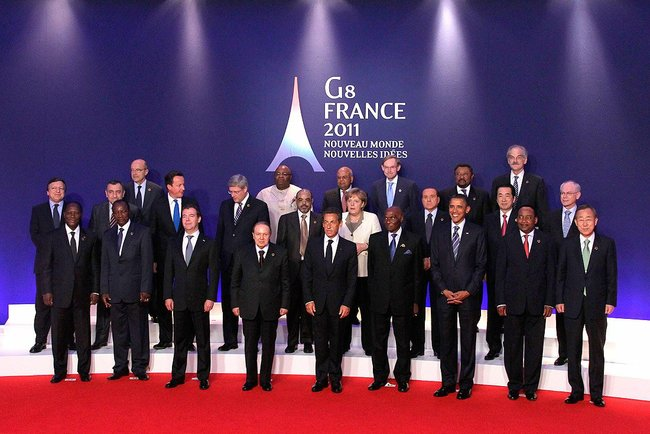
Traditional "family photo" at the G8 summit meeting in Deauville

These summit participants represent the current core members of the international forum:

**Core G8 members** Host state and leader are shown in bold text.
Member		Represented by	Title
(Canada)	Canada	Stephen Harper	Prime Minister
(France)	**France**	**Nicolas Sarkozy**	**President**
(Germany)	Germany	Angela Merkel	Chancellor
(Italy)	Italy	Silvio Berlusconi	Prime Minister
(Japan)	Japan	Naoto Kan	Prime Minister
(Russia)	Russia	Dmitry Medvedev	President
(United Kingdom)	United Kingdom	David Cameron	Prime Minister
(United States)	United States	Barack Obama	President
(European Union)	European Union	José Manuel Barroso	Commission President
(European Union)	European Union	Herman Van Rompuy	Council President
**Guest Invitees (Countries)**
Member		Represented by	Title
(Algeria)	Algeria	Abdelaziz Bouteflika	President
(Ivory Coast)	Côte d'Ivoire	Alassane Ouattara	President
(Egypt)	Egypt	Essam Sharaf	Prime Minister
(Ethiopia)	Ethiopia	Meles Zenawi	Prime Minister
(Equatorial Guinea)	Equatorial Guinea	Teodoro Obiang Nguema Mbasogo	President
(Guinea)	Guinea	Alpha Conde	President
(Niger)	Niger	Mahamadou Issoufou	President
(Nigeria)	Nigeria	Goodluck Jonathan (Note: The President of Nigeria was invited, but Goodluck Jonathan decided not to attend at the last minute. He worried that volcanic ash from an eruption in Iceland might delay his return flight to Nigeria; and this could disrupt his planned inauguration ceremonies on 29 May.)	President
(Senegal)	Senegal	Abdoulaye Wade	President
(South Africa)	South Africa	Jacob Zuma	President
(Tunisia)	Tunisia	Beji Caid Essebsi	Prime Minister
**Guest Invitees (International Institutions)**
Member		Represented by	Title
	African Union	Jean Ping	Chairperson
	New Partnership for Africa's Development	Jean Ping	Chairperson
(Arab League)	Arab League	Amr Moussa	Secretary-General
(International Monetary Fund)	International Monetary Fund	John Lipsky	managing director
(United Nations)	United Nations	Ban Ki-moon	Secretary-General
	World Bank Group	Robert Zoellick	President

== Priorities ==
Traditionally, the host country of the G8 summit sets the agenda for negotiations, but world events caused the list of topics to expand, including such issues such as the Fukushima nuclear accident, the European sovereign debt crisis, the conflict in Libya, Iran's nuclear programme, Syria's crackdown on pro-democracy protests, and the selection of a new managing director for the International Monetary Fund.

== Issues ==
The summit is a venue for resolving differences among its members. As a practical matter, the summit was also conceived as an opportunity for its members to give each other mutual encouragement in the face of difficult economic decisions. The G8 has become a forum for political and strategic discussions, and as a caucus within the G20.

== Schedule and Agenda ==
The agenda for the summit included some issues which remained unresolved from previous summits. French general priorities included:

1. New common challenges: the Internet, innovation, green growth and a sustainable economy, and nuclear safety
2. The 'Arab Springs': a partnership for democracy
3. Strengthening the partnership with Africa: a long-term vision
4. Peace and security: traditional themes of the G8

Some of the specific topics on the agenda were:

- Afghanistan;
- G8 + Broader Middle East and North Africa (BMENA);
- The Internet: new challenges
- Non-proliferation of Weapons of Mass Destruction
- The G8's Partnership with Africa
- Transatlantic Cocaine Trafficking
- Counter-terrorism
- G8 political and security issues

== Citizens' responses and authorities' counter-responses ==
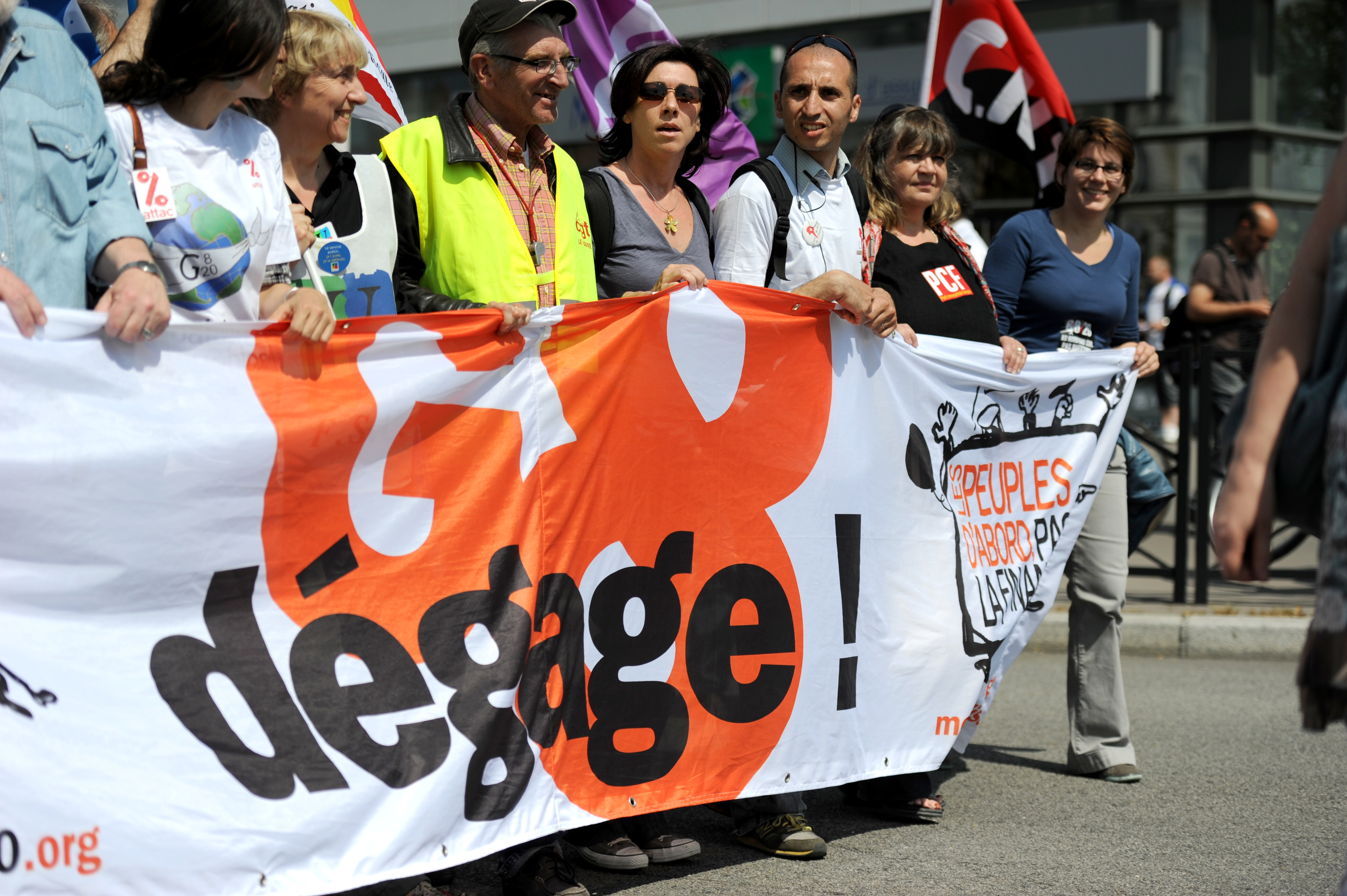
Front banner of the anti-G8 demonstration in Le Havre prior to the G8 summit, featuring the "G8 dégage" theme

Protest groups and other activists were expected to make a showing at the summit. The slogan G8 dégage ("G8 Go Away") was a recurring element of the demonstrations.

Protesters expressed their concerns about capitalism and what they perceive as the imperialism of western liberal democracies. The demonstrators are widely understood to be against globalisation.

== Accomplishments ==
This annual gathering of international leaders is an international event which is observed and reported by news media; and the G8's relevance and accomplishments are continuing topics of discussion. The event brings leaders together not so they can dream up quick fixes, but to talk and think about them together.

The 2011 summit meeting was marked by what the G8 called the "Deauville Partnership" with the people of North Africa. As a start, $20 billion were pledged in support for Tunisian and Egyptian reforms due to the Arab Spring.

== Security ==
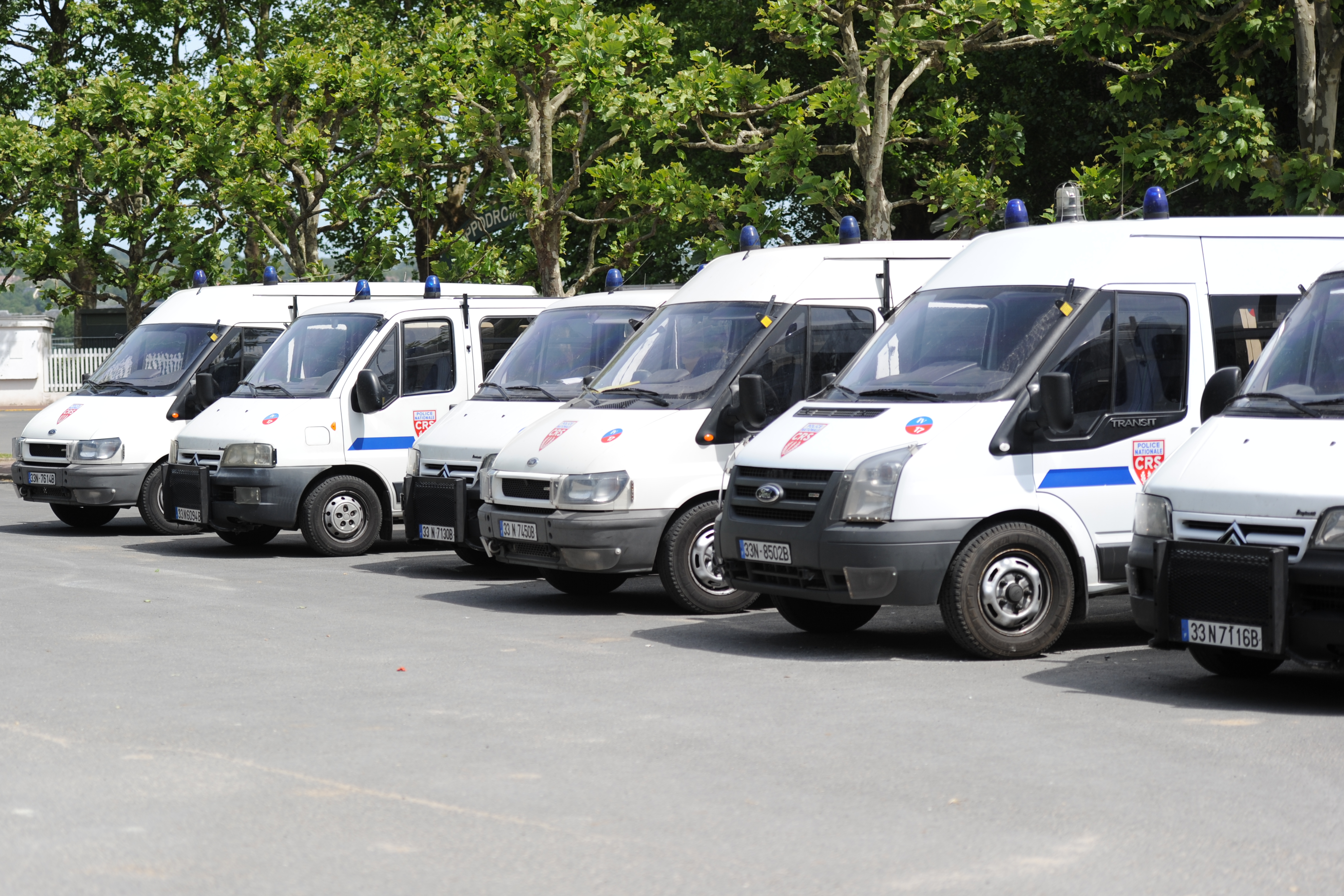
Police cars in Deauville belonging to the Compagnies Républicaines de Sécurité

Security planning was designed to ensure that the summit's formal agenda can remain the primary focus of the attendees' discussions; but effectively this meant converting the seaside resort into a fortress for the G8.

== Budget ==
In 2010, Sarkozy projected that the summits in Deauville and Cannes would cost "ten times less" than the preceding Canadian summits.

== Business opportunity ==
For some, the G8 summit became a profit-generating event. For example, the G8 Summit magazines have been published under the auspices of the host nations for distribution to all attendees since 1998.

According to the Mayor of Deauville, "Our main interest is the economic implications."

== Gallery of participating leaders ==
=== Core G8 participants ===
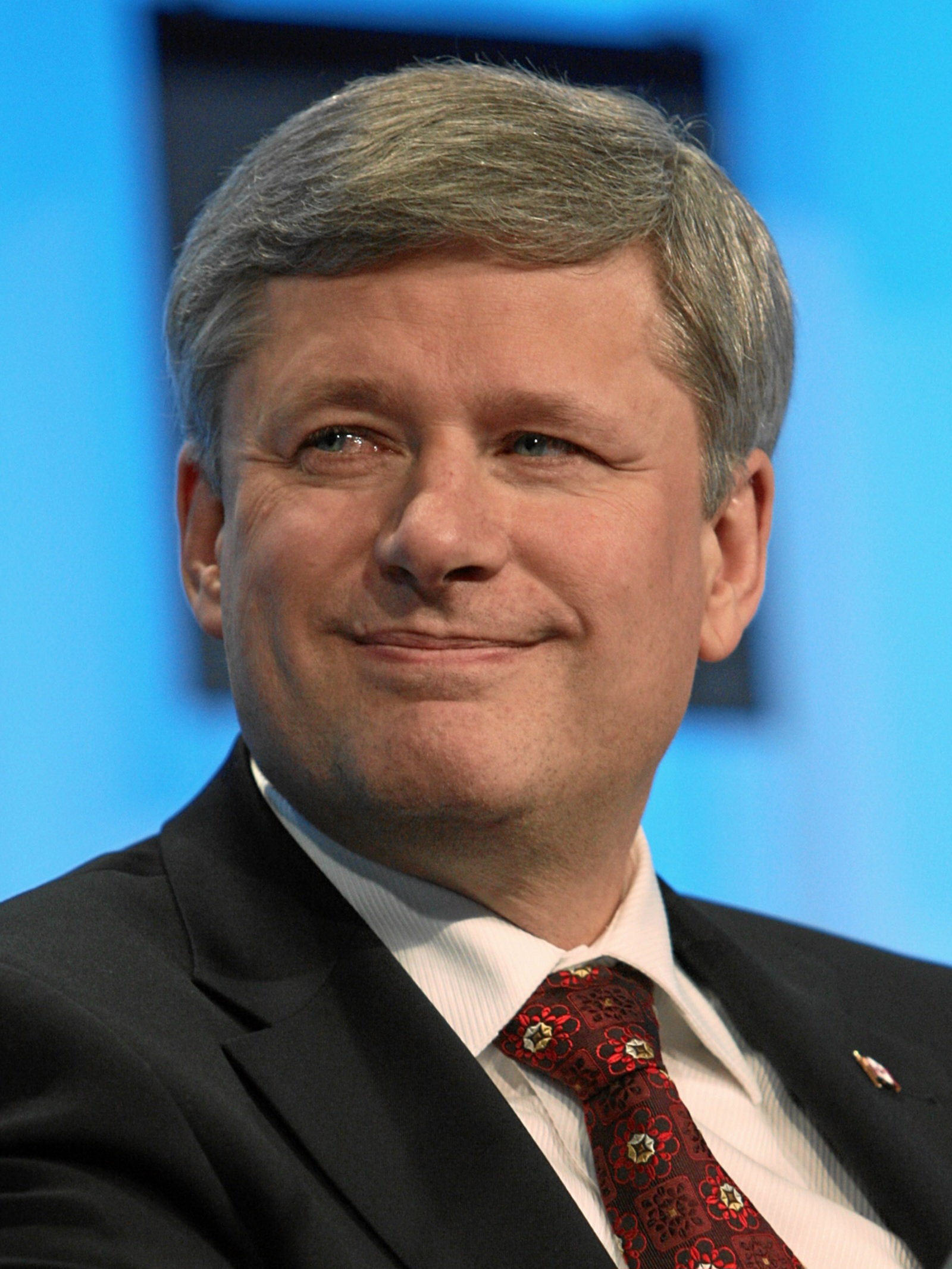
Canada
Stephen Harper,
Prime Minister

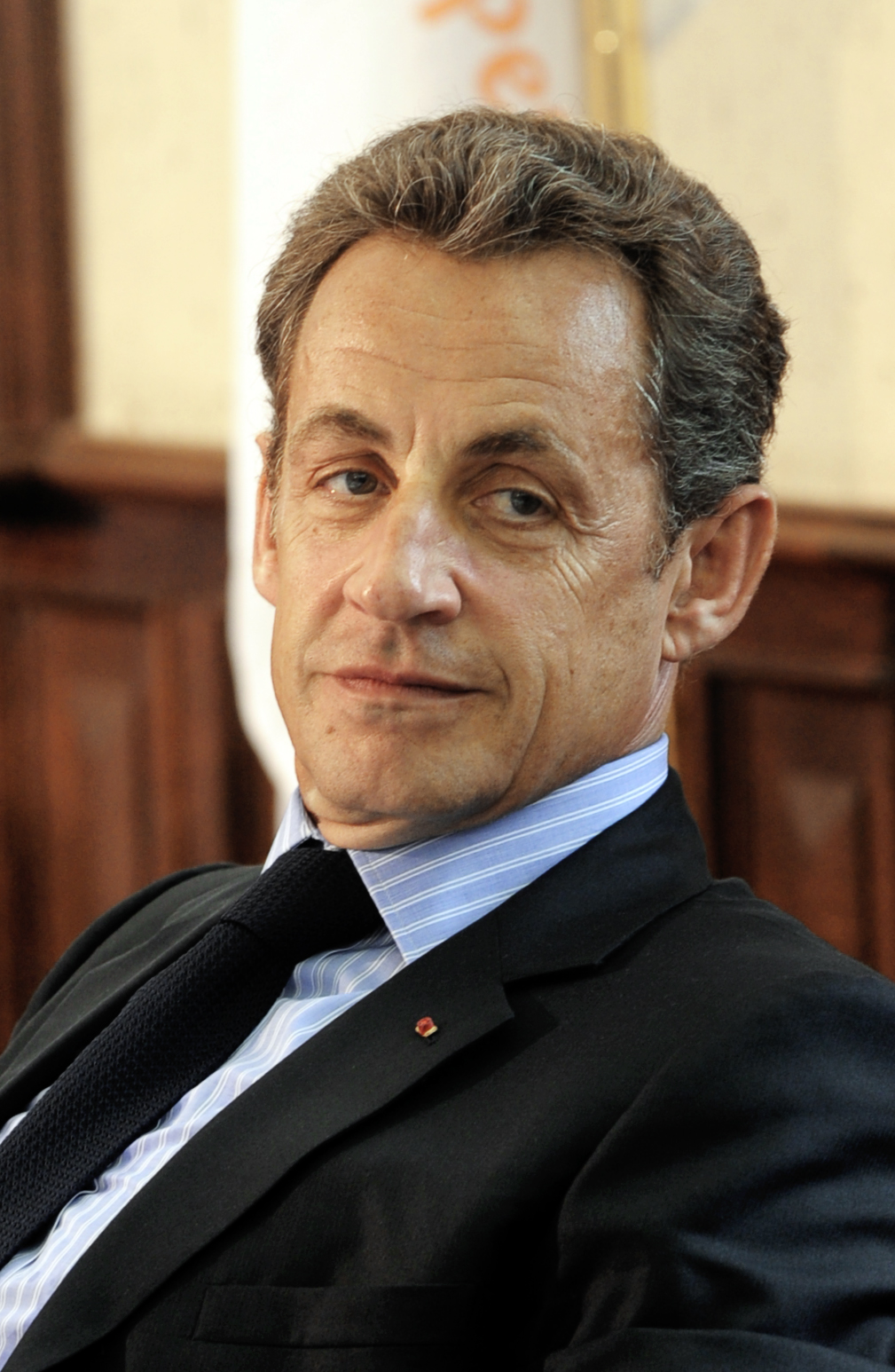
France
Nicolas Sarkozy,
President (Host)

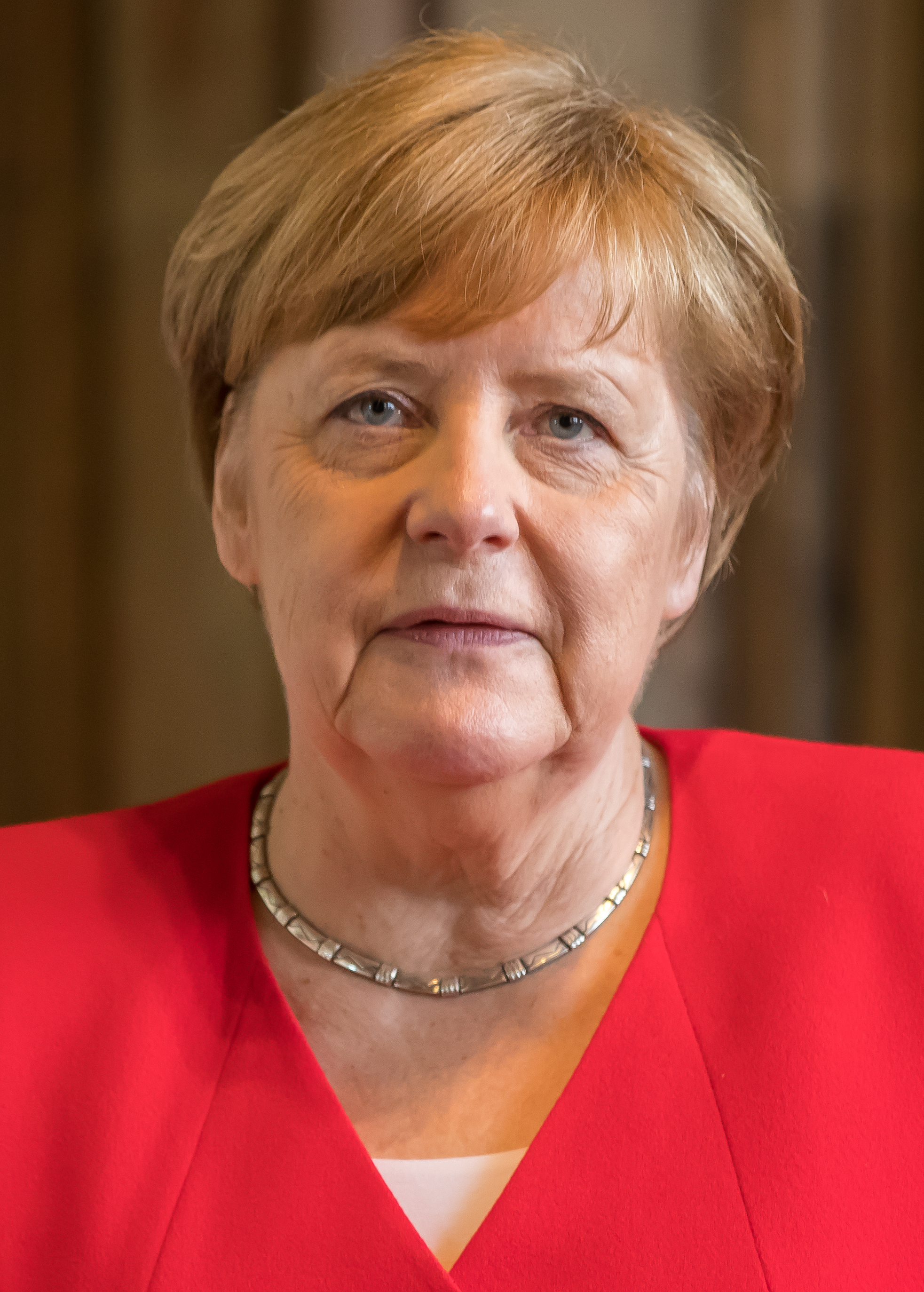
Germany
Angela Merkel,
Chancellor

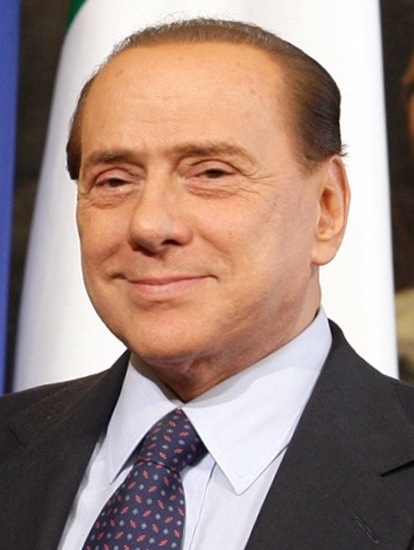
Italy
Silvio Berlusconi,
Prime Minister

Japan
Naoto Kan,
Prime Minister

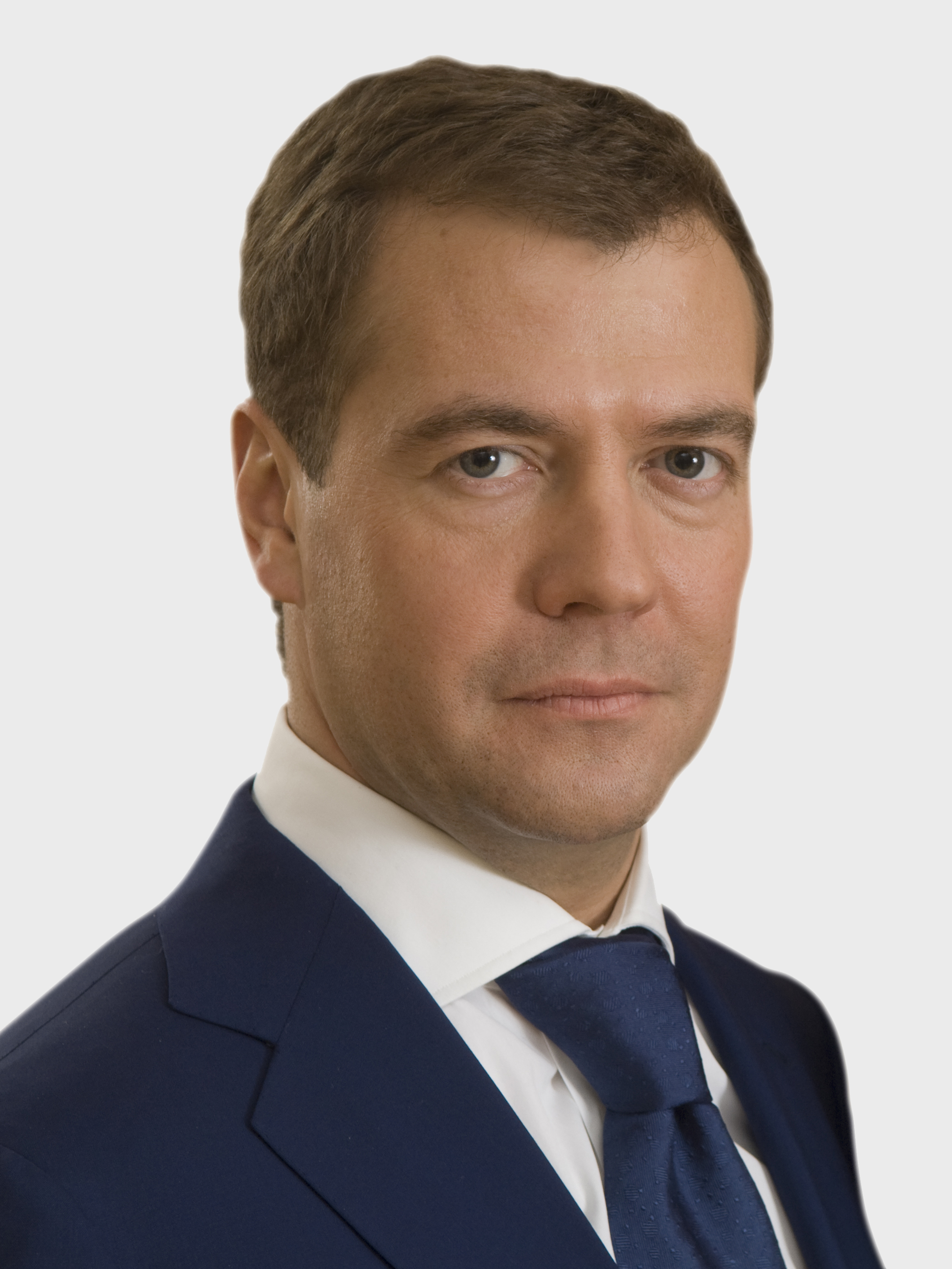
Russia
Dmitry Medvedev,
President

United Kingdom
David Cameron,
Prime Minister

United States
Barack Obama,
President
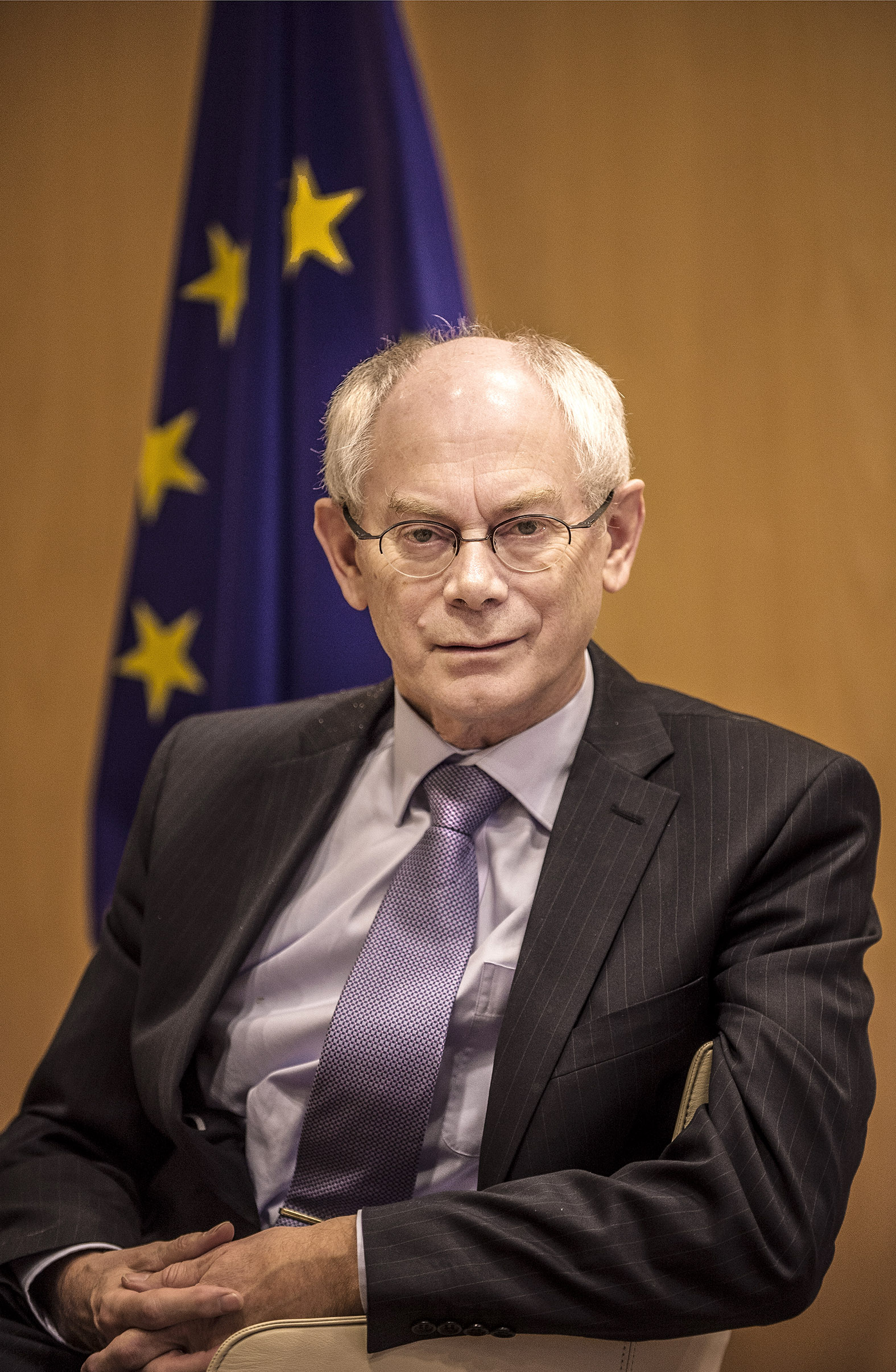
(European Union) European Union
Herman Van Rompuy,
Council President

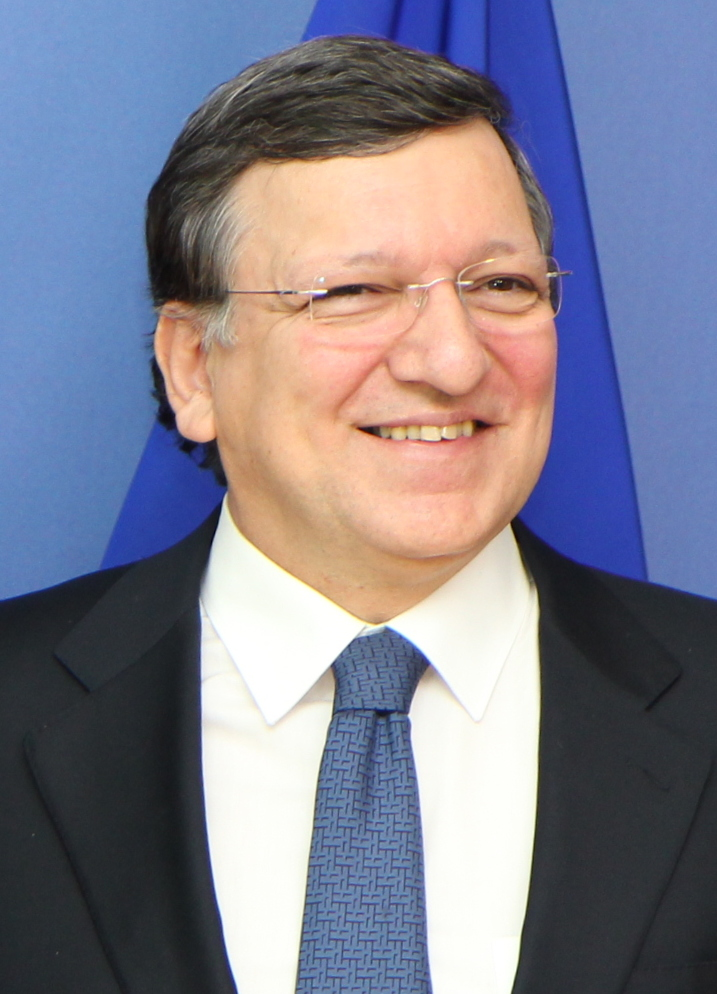
European Union
José Manuel Barroso,
Commission President

== See also ==
- 2011 G20 Cannes summit
- E-G8 Forum
- Intergovernmental Panel on Climate Change
- United Nations Framework Convention on Climate Change
