= André Morizet =

French politician

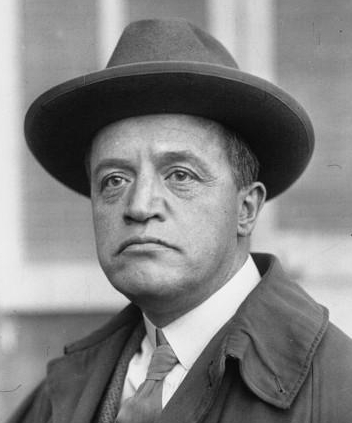
- Born: 23 January 1876; Reims, Marne, France
- Died: 30 March 1942 (aged 66); Paris, France
- Occupation: Politician
- Relatives: Jacques Kosciusco-Morizet (son-in-law); Nathalie Kosciusko-Morizet (great-granddaughter)

André Morizet (26 January 1876 – 30 March 1942) was a French politician. He served as a member of the French Senate from 1927 to 1942, representing Seine.

== Works ==
- Morizet, André (1903). Les secrétariats ouvriers en Allemagne. Paris: Editions du mouvement socialiste. OCLC 23961964.
- Morizet, André (1912). Pourquoi nous avons besoin d'une presse puissante. La presse moderne. Paris: Librairie du parti socialiste S.F.I.O. OCLC 493754349.
- Morizet, André (1921). De l'incapacité des militaires à faire la guerre. Paris: Editions Clarté. OCLC 30802224.
- Morizet, André (1922). Chez Lénine et Trotski, Moscou, 1921. Paris: La Renaissance du Livre. OCLC 1050247.
- Morizet, André (1932). Du vieux Paris au Paris moderne : Haussmann et ses prédécesseurs. Paris: Librairie Hachette. OCLC 13293200.
