= Guy Malherbe =

French politician

Mayor of Épinay-sur-Orge
- In office 1995–2017
- Preceded by: Christian Jeu
- Succeeded by: Véronique François

Member of the National Assembly for Essonne's 4th constituency
- In office 20 July 2007 – 22 March 2012
- Preceded by: Nathalie Kosciusko-Morizet
- Succeeded by: Nathalie Kosciusko-Morizet

Personal details
- Born: 9 April 1946 (age 79) Montpellier, France
- Party: The Republicans

Guy Malherbe (born April 9, 1946) is a member of the National Assembly of France. He represents the Essonne department, and is a member of the Union for a Popular Movement.
