= Essonne's 4th constituency =

Constituency of the National Assembly of France

4th constituency of Essonne
- inline Constituency of the National Assembly of France

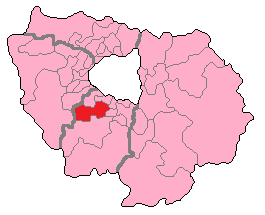
- Essonne's 4th Constituency shown within Île-de-France
- Deputy: Marie-Pierre Rixain; RE
- Department: Essonne
- Cantons: Limours, Longjumeau, Montlhéry, Villebon-sur-Yvette, Arpajon (Part)
- Registered voters: 92,236

The 4th constituency of Essonne is a French legislative constituency in the Essonne département.

== Description ==
The borders of the 4th constituency of Essonne have changed radically as a result of increase in the number of seats in the department. Prior to 1986 the seat covered the western edge of Essonne and included only one canton Limours that is within the boundaries of the seat today.

The seat is a mix of the more rural cantons of Limours and Montlhéry along with the southern fringes of the Paris suburbs around Villebon-sur-Yvette.

Politically the seat has changed substantially from a marginal profile prior to 1986 to a conservative stronghold. The seat's former representative Nathalie Kosciusko-Morizet is a former minister, spokesperson for Nicolas Sarkozy and candidate for Mayor of Paris.

== Historic Representation ==
Election	Member	Party
1967	Robert Vizet	PCF
1968	Léo Hamon	UDR
1969	Maurice Fraudeau	UDR
1973	Robert Vizet	PCF
1978	Robert Vizet	PCF
1981	Yves Tavernier	PS
1986	Proportional representation – no election by constituency	
1988	Pierre-André Wiltzer	UDF
1993	Pierre-André Wiltzer	UDF
1997	Pierre-André Wiltzer	UDF
2002	Nathalie Kosciusko-Morizet	UMP
2007	Nathalie Kosciusko-Morizet	UMP
2007	Guy Malherbe	UMP
2012	Nathalie Kosciusko-Morizet	UMP
2017	Marie-Pierre Rixain	LREM
2022	Marie-Pierre Rixain	RE

== Election results ==
=== 2024 ===
Candidate	Party	Alliance	First round			Second round		
Candidate	Party	Alliance	Votes	%	+/–	Votes	%	+/–
Marie-Pierre Rixain	RE	ENS	23,108	33.91	+2.19	42,392	64.56	+8.91
Jérôme Carbriand	LR-RN	UXD	21,144	31.03	+15.13	23,266	35.44	N/A
Amadou Deme	PCF	NFP	21,010	30.83	+3.34	WITHDREW		
Tony Gomes	REC		1,177	1.73	-3.71			
Michèle Pohyer	LO		790	1.16	+0.20			
Jean-François Ricois	DIV		500	0.73	N/A			
Yves Marty	DIV		419	0.61	N/A			
Valid votes			68,148	96.94	-1.14	66,658	95.08	+2.14
Blank votes			1,656	2.36	+0.86	2,728	3.95	-1.29
Null votes			493	0.70	+0.28	673	0.97	-0.85
Turnout			70,297	70.57	+19.78	69,059	69.31	+20.43
Abstentions			29,316	29.43	-19.78	30,573	30.69	-20.43
Registered voters			99,613			99,632		
Source: Ministry of the Interior, Le Monde
Result						RE HOLD		

=== 2022 ===
Legislative Election 2022: Essonne's 4th constituency
Party	Candidate	Votes	%	±%
LREM (Ensemble)	Marie-Pierre Rixain	15,598	31.72	-3.59
PCF (NUPÉS)	Amadou Deme	13,517	27.49	+5.71
RN	Alain Boutaleb	7,818	15.90	+7.03
LR (UDC)	Jérémy Martin	5,044	10.26	−5.54
REC	François La Selve	2,674	5.44	N/A
DVE	Iliane Polizzo	1,330	2.70	N/A
Others	N/A	3,188		
Turnout		50,132	50.79	−1.28
2nd round result
LREM (Ensemble)	Marie-Pierre Rixain	24,962	55.65	-2.10
PCF (NUPÉS)	Amadou Deme	19,891	44.35	N/A
Turnout		44,853	48.88	+9.89
LREM hold				

=== 2017 ===
Legislative Election 2017: Essonne's 4th constituency
Party	Candidate	Votes	%	±%
LREM	Marie-Pierre Rixain	17,742	35.31	
LR	Agnès Evren	7,941	15.80	
LFI	Bernard Terris	5,534	11.01	
FN	Franck Beeldens-Da Silva	4,456	8.87	
PS	Ophélie Guin	3,825	7.61	
DVD	Christian Schoettl	3,464	6.89	
DVD	François Pelletant	2,383	4.74	
EELV	Claire Pinto	1,586	3.16	
DLF	Sandra George	1,135	2.26	
Others	N/A	2,182		
Turnout		50,248	52.07	
2nd round result
LREM	Marie-Pierre Rixain	21,725	57.75	
LR	Agnès Evren	15,895	42.25	
Turnout		37,620	38.99	
LREM gain from LR		Swing		

=== 2012 ===
Legislative Election 2012: Essonne's 4th constituency
Party	Candidate	Votes	%	±%
UMP	Nathalie Kosciusko-Morizet	22,302	39.46	
PS	Olivier Thomas	20,512	36.29	
FN	Brigitte Dupin	6,436	11.39	
FG	Dominique Bardy	2,977	5.27	
EELV	Jacques Lucien Serna	1,565	2.77	
Others	N/A	2,731		
Turnout		56,523	61.27	
2nd round result
UMP	Nathalie Kosciusko-Morizet	29,337	51.48	
PS	Olivier Thomas	27,650	48.52	
Turnout		56,987	61.78	
UMP hold				

=== 2007 ===
Legislative Election 2007: Essonne's 4th constituency
Party	Candidate	Votes	%	±%
UMP	Nathalie Kosciusko-Morizet	24,682	46.97	
PS	Olivier Thomas	13,161	25.04	
MoDem	François Pelletant	5,842	11.12	
LV	Michèle Loeber	1,868	3.55	
PCF	Monique Le Peutrec	1,554	2.96	
FN	Cyrille Kehl	1,553	2.96	
Far left	Patrice Wach	1,221	2.32	
Others	N/A	2,669		
Turnout		53,255	62.93	
2nd round result
UMP	Nathalie Kosciusko-Morizet	27,576	56.09	
PS	Olivier Thomas	21,591	43.91	
Turnout		50,424	59.58	
UMP hold				

=== 2002 ===
Legislative Election 2002: Essonne's 4th constituency
Party	Candidate	Votes	%	±%
UMP	Pierre-André Wiltzer	22,238	44.09	
PS	Marianne Louis	14,238	28.23	
FN	Denise Boissier	5,059	10.03	
LV	Michele Gaspalou	1,757	3.48	
PCF	Claude Chevrier	1,614	3.20	
PR	Dominique Combaud	1,502	2.98	
Others	N/A	4,031		
Turnout		51,284	66.86	
2nd round result
UMP	Pierre-André Wiltzer	25,904	55.97	
PS	Marianne Louis	20,379	44.03	
Turnout		47,662	62.14	
UMP gain from UDF				

=== 1997 ===
Legislative Election 1997: Essonne's 4th constituency
Party	Candidate	Votes	%	±%
UDF	Pierre-André Wiltzer	13,460	28.34	
PS	Philippe Schmit	11,465	24.14	
FN	Gilles Mabire	6,434	13.55	
DVD	Gérard Nevers	3,849	8.10	
PCF	Sylvie Mayer	3,216	6.77	
Far left	Roland Mérieux	1,742	3.67	
MRC	Paul Loridant	1,685	3.55	
GE	Vincenzo de Matteis	1,531	3.22	
LO	Michel Turmel	1,415	2.98	
DVE	Michel Mombrun	1,351	2.84	
Others	N/A	1,344		
Turnout		49,719	69.08	
2nd round result
UDF	Pierre-André Wiltzer	25,998	52.14	
PS	Philippe Schmit	23,860	47.86	
Turnout		52,994	73.65	
UDF hold				

== Sources ==
Official results of French elections from 2002: "Résultats électoraux officiels en France" (in French).
