= Marie-Pierre Rixain =

French politician

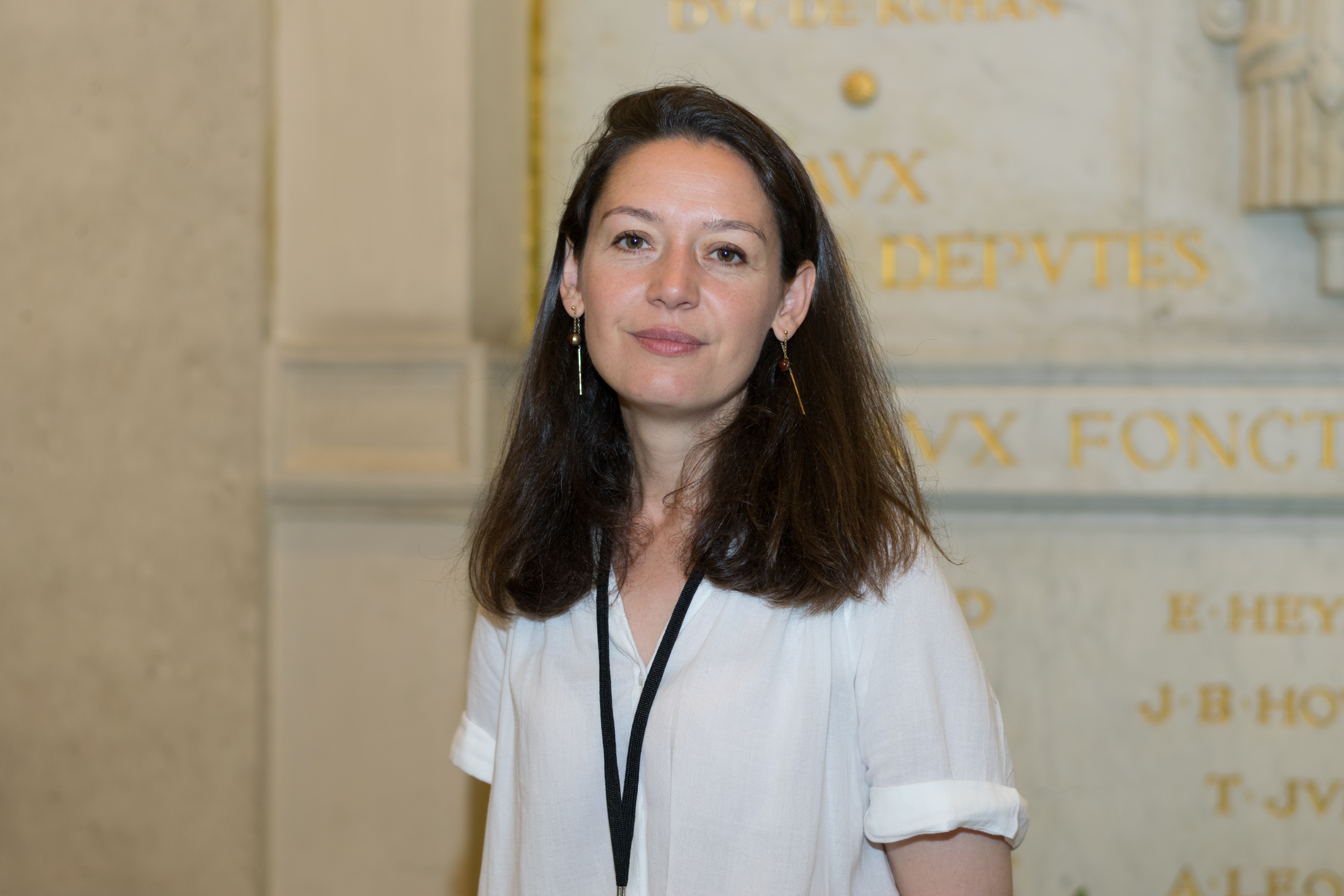

Member of the French National Assembly for Essonne's 4th constituency
- Incumbent
- Assumed office 21 June 2017
- Preceded by: Nathalie Kosciusko-Morizet

Personal details
- Born: 18 January 1977 (age 49) Saint-Cyr-l'École, France
- Party: LREM
- Education: University of Paris II Panthéon-Assas; Sciences Po Toulouse

Marie-Pierre Rixain (born 18 January 1977) is a French politician of La République En Marche! (LREM) who has been serving as a member of the National Assembly since 18 June 2017, representing the department of Essonne.

== Political career ==
In parliament, Rixan served on the Committee on Cultural Affairs and Education from 2017 until 2020 before moving to the Committee on Social Affairs. In addition to her committee assignments, she chairs the French-Maltese Parliamentary Friendship Group.

In July 2019, Rixain voted in favour of the French ratification of the European Union’s Comprehensive Economic and Trade Agreement (CETA) with Canada.

In 2020, Rixain went against her parliamentary group's majority and abstained from an important vote on a much discussed security bill drafted by her colleagues Alice Thourot and Jean-Michel Fauvergue that helps, among other measures, curtail the filming of police forces.

== See also ==
- 2017 French legislative election
