= Netvibes =

French web service

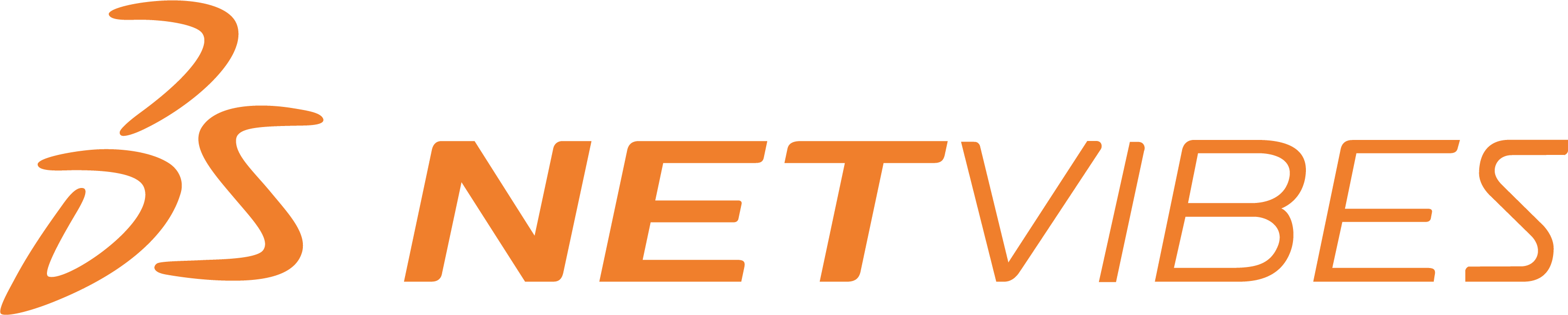
- Company type: Public
- Available in: Multilingual
- Headquarters: Paris, France
- Area served: Worldwide
- Founder: Tariq Krim
- Key people: Morgan Zimmermann (CEO since 2015)
- Parent: Dassault Systèmes
- Website: netvibes.com

Netvibes is a French brand of Dassault Systèmes that previously ran a web service offering a dashboard and feed reader. Currently, the company offers business intelligence tools.

== History ==
=== 2005–2012 ===
Founded in 2005 by Tariq Krim, the company provided software for personalized dashboards for real-time monitoring, social analytics, knowledge sharing, and decision support. In 2007, Deutsche Welle announced their partnership with Netvibes.

=== 2012–present ===
On February 9, 2012, Dassault Systèmes announced the acquisition of Netvibes. As of 2024, Netvibes also contains the operations of two other software companies acquired by Dassault Systèmes:

- Exalead: founded in 2000 by François Bourdoncle, the company provided search platforms and search-based applications for consumer and business users. On June 9, 2010, Dassault Systèmes acquired the company.
- Proxem: Founded in 2007 by François-Régis Caumartin, the company provided AI-powered semantic processing software and services. On June 23, 2020, Dassault Systèmes acquired Proxem and integrated its technology into the 3DEXPERIENCE® platform to complement its information intelligence applications.

In 2015, Netvibes introduced the Dashboard of Things (DoT).

Dassault Systèmes announced in April 2025 that Netvibes would retire its standalone web service offering on June 2, 2025.

== Activities ==
- Brand monitoring – to track clients, customers and competitors across media sources all in one place, analyze live results with third party reporting tools, and provide media monitoring dashboards for brand clients.
- E-reputation management – to visualize real-time online conversations and social activity online feeds, and track new trending topics.
- Product marketing – to create interactive product microsites, with drag-and-drop publishing interface.
- Community portals – to engage online communities
- Personalized workspaces – to gather all essential company updates to support specific divisions (e.g. sales, marketing, human resources) and localizations.

The software was a multi-lingual Ajax-based start page or web portal. It was organized into tabs, with each tab containing user-defined modules. Built-in Netvibes modules included an RSS/Atom feed reader, local weather forecasts, a calendar supporting iCal, bookmarks, notes, to-do lists, multiple searches, support for POP3, IMAP4 email as well as several webmail providers including Gmail, Yahoo! Mail, Hotmail, and AOL Mail, Box.net web storage, Delicious, Meebo, Flickr photos, podcast support with a built-in audio player, and several others.
A page could be personalized further through the use of existing themes or by creating personal theme. Customized tabs, feeds and modules can be shared with others individually or via the Netvibes Ecosystem. For privacy reasons, only modules with publicly available content could be shared.
