= Nathalie Kosciusko-Morizet =

French engineer, advocate and former politician

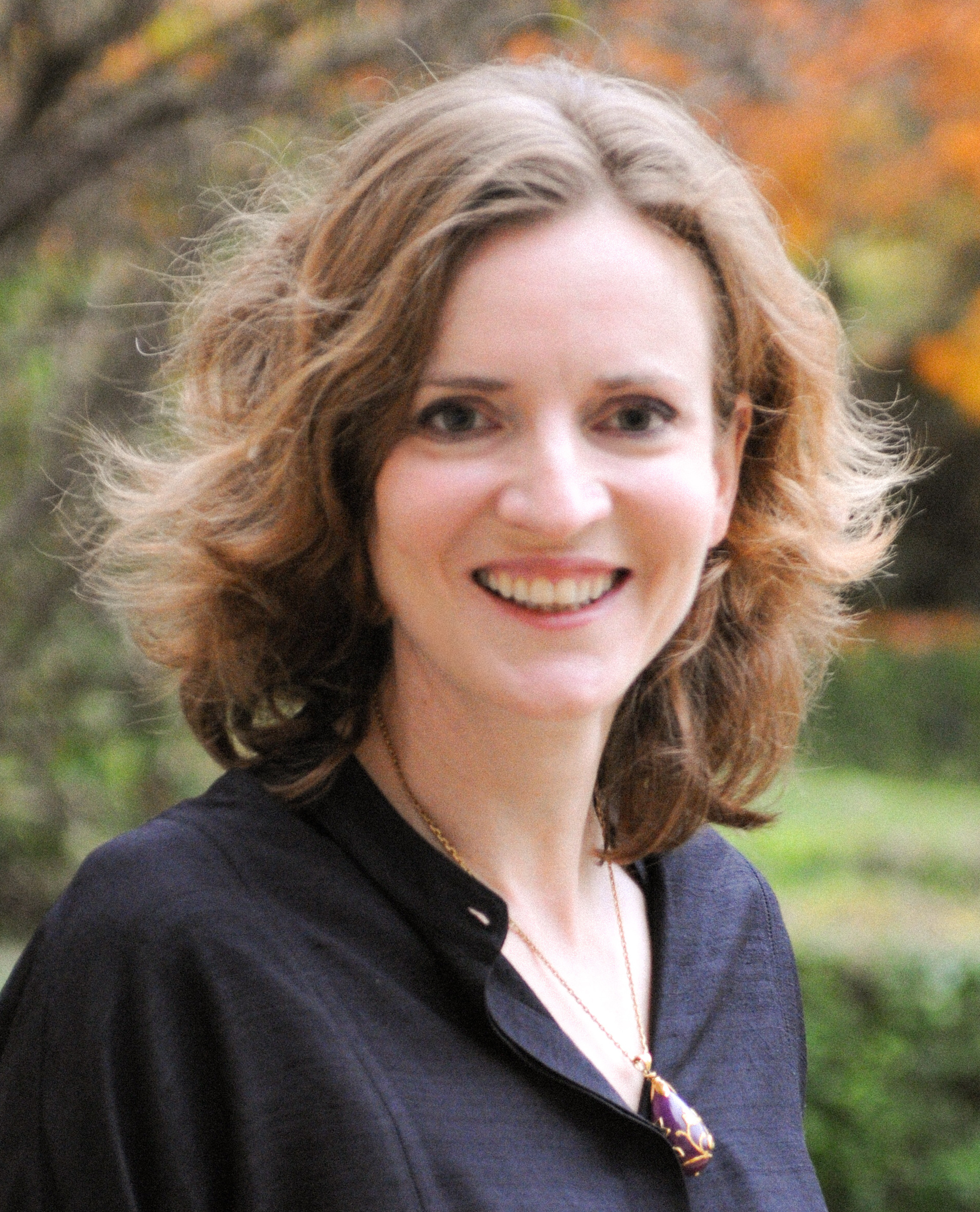
- Kosciusko-Morizet in 2014

Member of the National Assembly
- In office 23 March 2012 – 18 June 2017
- Preceded by: Guy Malherbe
- Succeeded by: Marie-Pierre Rixain
- Constituency: Essonne's 4th
- In office 19 July 2002 – 19 July 2007
- Preceded by: Pierre-André Wiltzer
- Succeeded by: Guy Malherbe
- Constituency: Essonne's 4th

Mayor of Longjumeau
- In office 22 March 2008 – 25 February 2013
- Preceded by: Bernard Nieuviaert
- Succeeded by: Sandrine Gelot-Rateau

Minister of Ecology, Sustainable Development, Transport and Housing
- In office 14 November 2010 – 22 February 2012
- Prime Minister: François Fillon
- Preceded by: Jean-Louis Borloo
- Succeeded by: François Fillon

Councillor of Paris
- In office 5 April 2014 – 24 August 2018
- Constituency: 14th arrondissement of Paris

Member of the Regional Council of Île-de-France
- In office 28 March 2004 – 16 November 2010
- Constituency: Essonne

Personal details
- Born: Nathalie Geneviève Marie Kosciusko-Morizet; 14 May 1973 (age 53) Paris, France
- Party: LR (2015–present)
- Other political affiliations: RPR (until 2002); UMP (2002–2015)
- Spouse: Jean-Pierre Philippe (m. 2003; div. 2016)
- Children: 2
- Parent: François Kosciusko-Morizet (father)
- Education: École Polytechnique; Collège des Ingénieurs
- Occupation: Engineer • Politician

Nathalie Geneviève Marie Kosciusko-Morizet (French pronunciation: [natali kɔsjysko mɔʁizɛ]) (born 14 May 1973), often referred to by her initials NKM, is an engineer and former politician.

She was a Member of Parliament, returned to the National Assembly from the Essonne 4th constituency for three consecutive mandates from 2002 to 2017, mayor of Longjumeau from 2008 to 2013, and an unsuccessful mayoral candidate for Paris in 2014. She has held positions of Regional Councillor for Île-de-France. She was twice a member of the French government and Minister of Ecology, Sustainable Development, Transport and Housing. She was also Assistant General Secretary of then majority party UMP and spokesperson for Nicolas Sarkozy in the 2012 presidential election. Since standing for mayor of Paris in March 2014, she had been leader of the opposition of the Council of Paris until her withdrawal from politics. From December 2014 to December 2015 she was Vice President of then opposition party UMP (renamed The Republicans).

== Early life and education ==
Kosciusko-Morizet was born on 14 May 1973. She is of Polish Jewish descent but was raised Roman Catholic. She comes from a political family, the Kosciusko-Morizets. Her grandfather, Jacques Kosciusko (1913–1994) was an academic, a member of the French Resistance during the war, a Gaullist politician and former French ambassador in the US whose father-in-law, André Morizet, was a socialist senator and mayor of Boulogne-Billancourt. Her father François Kosciusko-Morizet (1940–2015) was the mayor of Sèvres. She is also the sister of Pierre Kosciusko-Morizet (b. 1977), one of the founders of Priceminister.com, the third ranked e-commerce site in France. According to genealogists, she is also related to Lucrezia Borgia from her mother's side, the Treuille family.

Kosciusko-Morizet graduated from the École Polytechnique and the Collège des Ingénieurs.

== Political career ==
=== Local elections ===
As a twenty-nine-year-old, Kosciusko-Morizet was elected a member of the French National Assembly in 2002, representing the department of Essonne, to the south of Paris, serving out the term for Pierre-André Wiltzer who was appointed deputy minister. She was reelected in 2007 and 2012. In parliament, she served on the Committee on Legal Affairs. In addition to her committee assignments, she was part of the French-Polish Parliamentary Friendship Group.

In the 2008 French municipal elections, Kosciusko-Morizet was elected mayor of Longjumeau (Essonne).

=== Career in government ===
In the government of Prime Minister François Fillon, Kosciusko-Morizet became a state secretary in the French government responsible for the environment in 2007, serving under Minister of Ecology, Energy, Sustainable Development and the Sea Jean-Louis Borloo. Then in 2009 she became state secretary with responsibility for Forward Planning, Assessment of Public Policies and Development of the Digital Economy, before eventually succeeding Borloo as Minister for Ecology, Sustainable Development, Transport and Housing in November 2010. In this capacity, she chaired the meetings of G8 energy ministers when France held the group's rotating presidency in 2011.

In 2012, Kosciusko-Morizet left her position as minister to become spokesperson for Nicolas Sarkozy during his presidential reelection campaign.

=== Municipal candidacy for Paris ===
In February 2013, Kosciusko-Morizet announced she would be a candidate for the Mayor of Paris in the 2014 local elections. She faced among others Rachida Dati in the UMP primary election. The polls had Kosciusko-Morizet as a favourite to win the primary. She was endorsed by François Fillon.

On 3 June 2013 Kosciusko-Morizet won UMP's primaries for the office of Mayor of Paris with 58.16% of the vote.

In the Mayoral elections held on 23 March and 30 March 2014, Kosciusko-Morizet's UMP lists were defeated by the lists led by Socialist Deputy Mayor Anne Hidalgo, who was elected Mayor of Paris on 4 April 2015. The Socialist, Green and Communist parties created a coalition with 91 councillors, while the UMP and UDI-Modem parties were relegated to the opposition with 71 councillors.

=== 2016 Republican primary ===
After Nicolas Sarkozy's return in politics in 2014, Kosciusko-Morizet was appointed vice-president of the UMP (since 2015 The Republicans) to represent the moderate fringe of the party, while her rival Laurent Wauquiez represented the hardline part. After the 2015 regional elections, during which Wauquiez successfully ran in Auvergne-Rhône-Alpes, she was ousted by Sarkozy for criticizing his strategy and was replaced by Wauquiez.

Then, Kosciusko-Morizet announced her candidacy for the primary. Despite some difficulties, she got the sufficient number of supports to run. She finished fourth with only 2.6% of the vote, far behind Sarkozy (20.1%). She endorsed Alain Juppé for the second round.

=== 2017 national elections ===
In the French legislative election of 2017, Kosciusko-Morizet stood in Paris's 2nd constituency, previously held by former prime minister François Fillon. During the campaign, she was hospitalised for a night after falling on the pavement and hitting her head when a protester threw a batch of election leaflets in her face. She was defeated in the second round of the election by La République En Marche! candidate Gilles Le Gendre.

== Career in the private sector ==
In 2017, Kosciusko-Morizet joined Capgemini, where she was in charge of the cyberdefense division in New York. She has since been working for Antin Infrastructure Partners in New York (2021–2024) and Paris (since 2024).

== Political positions ==
Although considered close to Jacques Chirac throughout his presidency, Kosciusko-Morizet is considered socially liberal and part of the "blue ecologists" group. She supports marriage equality and is a strong advocate of green issues. In an interview to the Daily Telegraph in March 2013, she said she held "a lot of admiration" for former British Prime Minister Margaret Thatcher. During the 2016 primaries, she presented herself as the only solidly pro-European politician among the party's eight presidential candidates. Within the Republicans, she has been one of the sharpest critics of the National Front (FN), warning that the party "would disfigure France".

In a 2016 op-ed published by Sunday newspaper Le Journal du Dimanche, Kosciusko-Morizet joined sixteen other high-profile women from across the political spectrum – including Élisabeth Guigou, Christine Lagarde, and Fleur Pellerin – in making a public vow to expose "all sexist remarks, inappropriate gestures and behaviour".

== Personal life ==
Kosciusko-Morizet was married to Jean-Pierre Philippe and has two sons, born in 2005 and 2009. In March 2016, she announced that she and JP Philippe had divorced by mutual consent.

== Political offices held ==
=== Governmental functions ===
- Secretary of State for Ecology : 2007–2009.
- Secretary of State and Prospective Development of the Digital Economy : 2009–2010.
- Minister for Ecology, Sustainable Development, Transport and Housing: November 2010 – February 2012 (She resigned from government to become spokeswoman of Nicolas Sarkozy's presidential campaign).

=== Electoral mandates ===
==== National Assembly of France ====
- Member of the National Assembly of France for Essonne (4th constituency) : 2002–2007 (Became secretary of State in 2007). Elected in 2002, reelected in 2007.

==== Regional Council ====
- Regional councillor of Ile-de-France : 2004–2010 (She resigned in November 2010). Reelected in 2010.

==== Municipal Council ====
- Mayor of Longjumeau : Since 2008.
- Municipal councillor of Longjumeau : Since 2008.

==== Agglomeration Community Council ====
- Vice-president of the Europ'Essonne Agglomeration Community Council : Since 2008.
- Member of the Europ'Essonne Agglomeration Community Council : Since 2008.

== Sources ==
- Mme Nathalie Kosciusko-Morizet, Assemblée nationale (in French)
- Finances de la ville de Paris (in French)

Political offices
Preceded by Jean-Louis Borloo	Minister of Ecology, Sustainable Development, Transport and Housing; 2010–2012	Succeeded by François Fillon
Party political offices
Preceded by Françoise de Panafieu	Union for a popular movement Nominee for Mayor of Paris; 2014	Most recent
