= Pierre Kosciusko-Morizet =

French entrepreneur (born 1977)

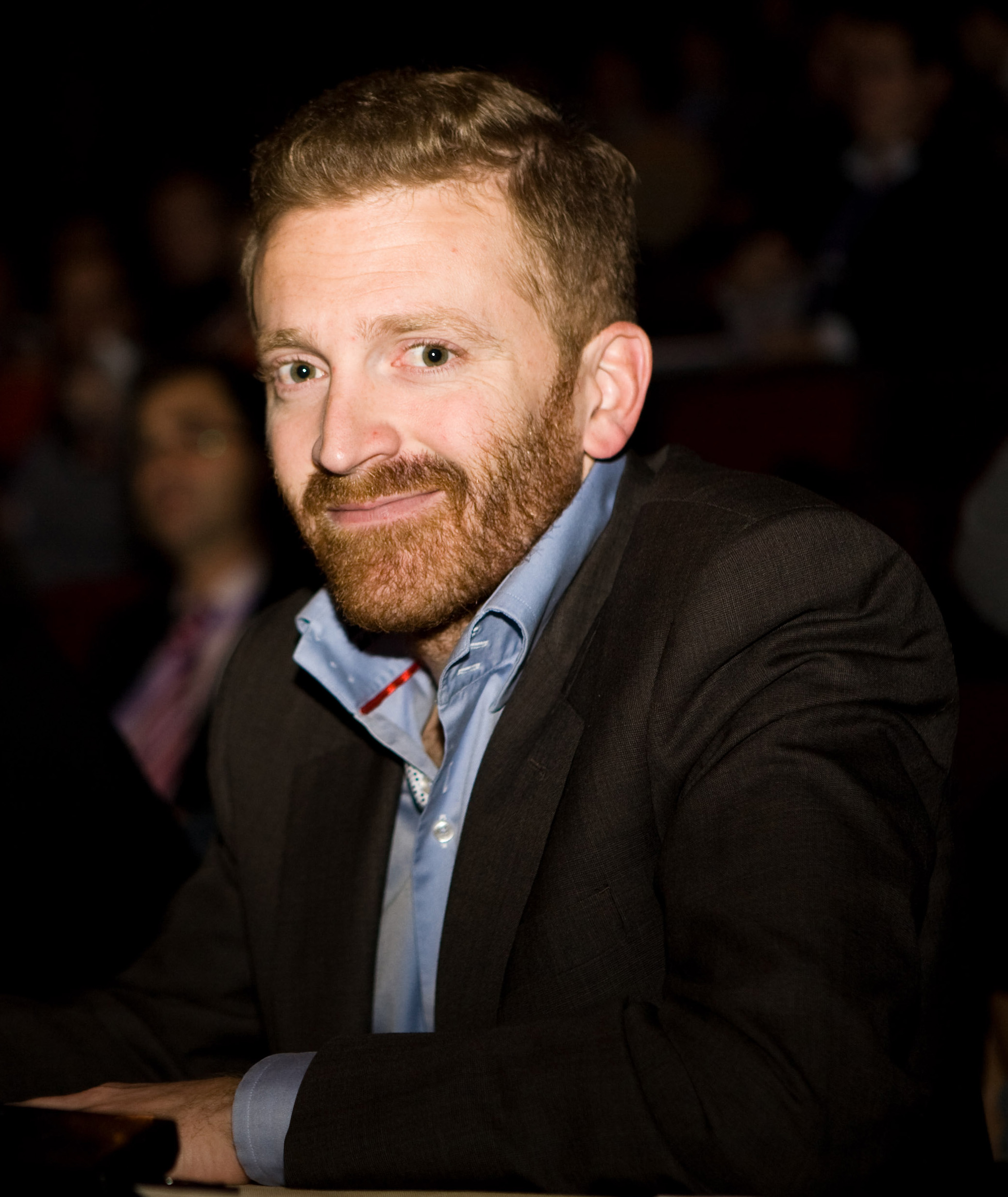
- Pierre Kosciusko-Morizet in 2008
- Born: 17 April 1977 (age 49); Orléans, France
- Education: HEC Paris (1999)
- Occupation: Founder of Rakuten France

Pierre Kosciusko-Morizet, born on April 17, 1977, in Orléans, is a French entrepreneur and business angel, and the co-founder and former president of the online marketplace PriceMinister (which became Rakuten France in 2018).

== Biography ==
Pierre Kosciusko-Morizet was born on April 17, 1977, in Orléans. He is related to both the Polish independence soldier Tadeusz Kosciuszko and André Morizet, one of the founders of the French Communist Party. His sister, Nathalie Kosciusko-Morizet is a former government minister.

In 1998, while studying at HEC Paris, Kosciusko-Morizet launched his first company, Visualis SA.

After graduating from HEC in 1999, he became the head of the marketing and finance department at Capital One. In August 2000, he founded PriceMinister alongside Pierre Krings, and the site launched in January 2001.

In 2007, while teaching a course on business creation at HEC Entrepreneurs, he proposed the idea for PeopleDoc to his student, Jonathan Benhamou. He became the company's first investor and a member of its board of directors.

In 2008, Kosciusko-Morizet co-founded the investment firm Kernel Investissements with Pierre Krings. Kernel Investissements has invested in companies such as Doctolib, Yellow Korner, LaBonneBox, Restoflash, Comet Meetings, and Blade.

In June 2010, PriceMinister was acquired by the Japanese company Rakuten; Pierre Kosciusko-Morizet remained the company's CEO and subsequently served as CEO for Europe for the entire Rakuten group until May 2014.

Kosciusko-Morizet is a co-founder and chairman of the strategic committee of ISAI, an investment fund for internet entrepreneurs.

In 2013 Kosciusko-Morizet was the subject of an unflattering profile in the French financial newspaper, Les Echos: "The promoter of the "Become a penny-pincher" slogan, according to Ouest-France, bought himself an island off the coast of Cancale, formerly owned by the Poilâne family. Helipad, swimming pool... Pierre sells books but doesn't read: he sings. On YouTube, you can hear him performing Léo Ferré. Is this how men live?"

In 2015, he was a guest at the West Web Festival, an annual event held in Carhaix-Plouguer during the Vieilles Charrues Festival.
