= MyLittleAdventure =

Website where travellers can search and book things to do all over the world

- Website type: Tourism
- Available in: 10 languages
- Owner: HundredLabs SAS
- Website: www.mylittleadventure.com
- Commercial: yes
- Launched: 2016; 10 years ago

MyLittleAdventure is a website where travellers can search and book things to do all over the world. The user needs to choose any city in the world, select and rank what matters most to him, and get the activity recommendations according to his preferences. MyLittleAdventure's database includes 56k restaurants, 245k tours and activities providers, 30k things to do with locals and 45k live events, as well as tickets to numerous tourist attractions and city passes.

Founded in 2016, the website is owned by the France-based startup company HundredLabs SAS (Société par actions simplifiée). The company has partnered with websites such as Amadeus IT Group.
