= François Bourdoncle =

French businessman

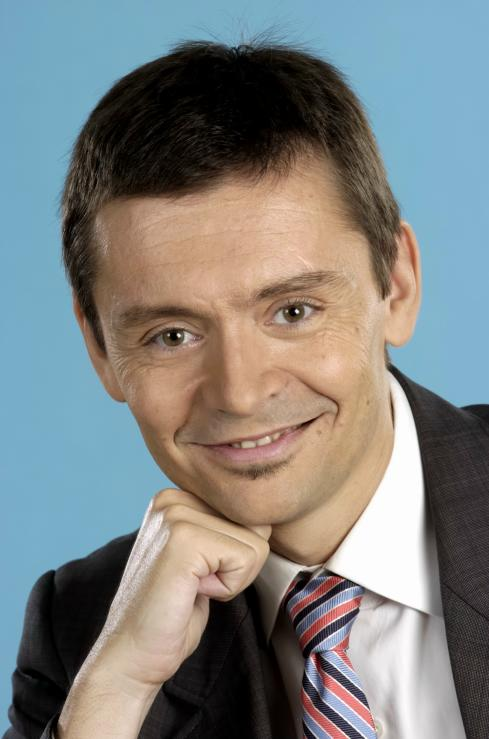
François Bourdoncle

François Bourdoncle (born 1964) is founder and Chief Strategist of the search engine company Exalead. He is currently president of FB&Cie.

== Literature ==
- Semantic Analysis of Interval Congruences, 1993, ISBN 3-540-57316-X, Author François Bourdoncle, Springer-Verlag, London, UK.

== Education ==
A graduate of École polytechnique (class of 1984), then of Mines ParisTech, then an engineer at the Corps des mines, he obtained a doctorate in information technology from École polytechnique in 1992 on the Semantics of imperative languages and higher-order abstract interpretation, under the direction of Patrick Cousot.

== Distinctions ==
François Bourdoncle had been ranked amongst the ten best French engineers for 2005, according to the ranking established by L’Usine nouvelle, Industry and Technology at the CNISF (Ingénieurs et scientifiques de France), and has obtained the prize “entrepreneur”. He was named Knight in the National Order of Merit in 2007 and Knight in the order of the Legion of Honour on 1 January 2009.
