= Search-based application =

A search-based application is a software application in which a search engine platform is used as the core infrastructure for information access and reporting. Search-based applications use semantic technologies to aggregate, normalize and classify unstructured, semi-structured and/or structured content across multiple repositories, and employ natural language technologies for accessing the aggregated information.

== Pre-conditions ==
Search-based applications are fully packaged applications that:

- Are built on a search backbone to enable sub-second access to information in multiple formats and from multiple sources
- Are delivered as a unified work environment to support a specific task or workflow, for example: eDiscovery, financial services regulatory compliance, fraud detection, voice of the customer, sales prospecting, pharmaceutical research, anti-terrorism intelligence, or customer support.
- Integrate all the tools that are commonly needed for that specific task or workflow, including:
  - Multi-source information access
  - Authoring
  - Collaboration
  - Business process
  - Reporting and analysis
  - Alerting
  - Visualization
- Provide pre-configured data integration with multiple repositories of information in multiple formats as appropriate for the application domain.
- Integrate domain knowledge to support the particular task, including industry taxonomies and vocabularies, internal processes, workflow for the task, connectors to specialized collections of information, and decision heuristics typical of the field.
- Provide a compelling user interface and interaction design that eliminates the need for users to “pogo stick” or continually jump from one application to another. This buffers the user from the complexity of operating separate applications and enables them to focus on getting work done.
- Are quick to deploy, easy to customize or extend, and economical to administer

== Practical uses ==
Search-based applications are used for a variety of purposes, including:

- Enterprise Business Applications: For example, customer relationship management, enterprise resource planning, Supply Chain Management, Compliance & Discovery, and business intelligence
- Web Applications: Typically, business to business, business to consumer, and consumer to business applications that mash-up data and functionality from diverse sources (databases, Web content, user-generated content, mapping data and functions, etc.)

The use of a search platform as the core infrastructure for software applications has been enabled largely by two search engine features: 1) Scalability 2) Ad hoc access to multiple heterogeneous sources from a single point of access.

Search-based applications have proven popular and effective because they provide a dynamic, scalable access infrastructure that can be integrated with other features that information workers need: task-specific, and easy to use work environments that integrate features that are usually designed to be used as separate applications, collaborative features, domain knowledge, and security.

Search engines are not a replacement for database systems; they are a complement. They have been optimally engineered to facilitate access to information, not to record and store transactions. In addition, the mathematical and statistical processors integrated to date into search engines remain relatively simple. At present, therefore, databases still provide a more effective structure for complex analytical functions. Search applications also focus on providing quality results considering search relevancy.

== See also ==
- Agile application
- Agile development
- Business Intelligence 2.0 (BI 2.0)
- Enterprise Search
- Search oriented architecture
- Software as a service
