= Rakuten France =

French e-commerce marketplace

- Company type: Subsidiary
- Available in: French
- Founded: August 2000; 26 years ago
- Headquarters: Paris, France
- Key people: Cédric Dufour (CEO)
- Industry: Electronic commerce
- Products: Books; Music; Video; Video games; Electronics; Fashion; Home goods; Food
- Employees: ~250
- Parent: Rakuten Group
- Website: fr.shopping.rakuten.com
- Launched: 2000

Rakuten France, formerly PriceMinister, was a French e-commerce company that operates the online marketplace fr.shopping.rakuten.com. The platform allows individuals and businesses to buy and sell new and used goods, including books, electronics, clothing and household products.

The company was founded in 2000 as PriceMinister and was acquired by the Japanese technology conglomerate Rakuten Group in 2010. In 2018, the service was rebranded from PriceMinister to Rakuten France as part of Rakuten's global brand strategy.

== History ==
The company was founded in August 2000, originally located in Paris, at 57 Boulevard de la Villette, in a former zeppelin factory dating from the 1880s.

In June 2010, the company was bought by Rakuten, the largest Japanese e-commerce site. The company moved in January 2012 to the former department store "Au Reaumur" in central Paris. In May 2014, four years after the acquisition by Rakuten, Pierre Kosciusko-Morizet and Pierre Krings announced that they were leaving their positions as CEO and COO of Rakuten Europe and general director of PriceMinister. Olivier Mathiot, co-founder and former director of marketing and communications, was promoted to CEO of PriceMinister.

In late 2018, the site was rebranded as Rakuten and then transferred to the Rakuten domain. That year Fabien Versavau became CEO.

On September 30, 2026, Rakuten France marketplace ceased operations.

== See also ==
- Consumer-to-consumer electronic commerce
