= French frigate Résistance =

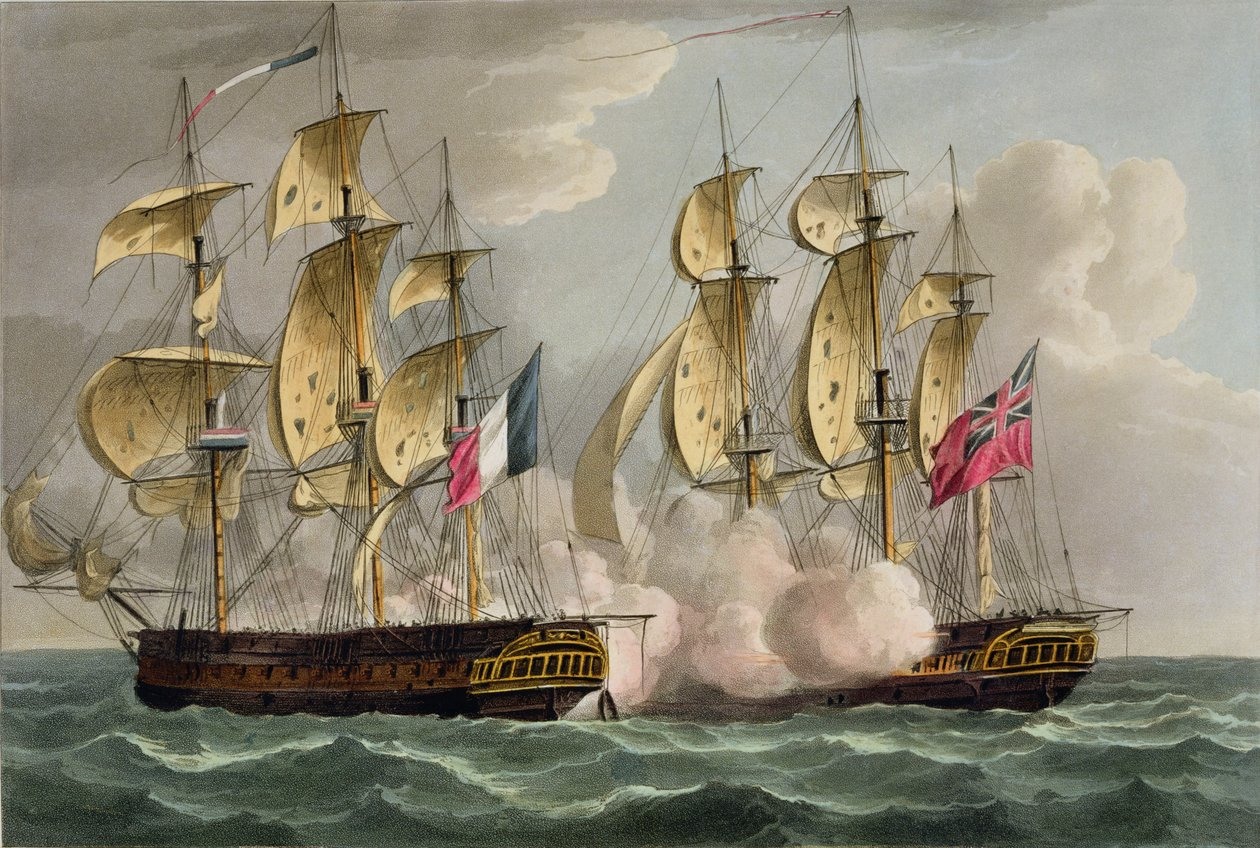
- Capture of Immortalité by Fisgard (ex-Résistance).

History

France
- Name: Résistance
- Builder: Paimbœuf
- Laid down: April 1794
- Launched: 28 November 1795
- In service: May 1796
- Captured: 9 March 1797, by the Royal Navy

Great Britain
- Name: HMS Fisgard
- Acquired: 9 March 1797
- Fate: Sold in August 1814

General characteristics
- Class & type: 48-gun Vengeance-class frigate
- Tons burthen: 1,183 (bm)
- Length: 48.7 m (159 ft 9 in)
- Beam: 12.7 m (41 ft 8 in)
- Draught: 6.4 m (21 ft 0 in)
- Sail plan: Full-rigged ship
- Armament: 28 × 18-pounder long guns; 12 × 8-pounder long guns; Further armament on castles

Résistance was a 48-gun Vengeance-class frigate of the French Navy. HMS St Fiorenzo captured her in 1797 and the Royal Navy took her into service as HMS Fisgard. She was sold in 1814.

== French career ==
The French Navy ordered her on 8 March 1793 as Fidélité, but she was renamed Résistance while still on the stocks. In 1797 she served as a troop ship, ferrying the Légion Noire to Cardigan Bay during the Battle of Fishguard. On 9 March 1797, HMS St Fiorenzo and Nymphe, captured her, along with Constance.

== British career ==
The Royal Navy took Résistance into service as the first HMS Fisgard, naming her after the town of Fishguard because of her role in the battle. On 20 October 1798 she captured Immortalité.

On 3 April 1800, Fisgard recaptured the United States letter of marque Minerva, which the French privateer Minerve had captured on 31 March.

Between the 20th of July and 2 August 1800, Captain T.B. Martin and Fisgard captured four vessels:

- St. John Baptiste, a Spanish lugger, that she burnt:
- Gironde a French privateer of 16 guns and 141 men. Gironde had been a particularly successful and active vessel. She had on board 53 English prisoners, the masters and crews of four vessels that she had captured;
- Alerte, a French privateer of 14 guns and 84 men. She was only six days out of Bordeaux and had been sent out to intercept the homeward bound West India convoy; and
- Joseph, an English South Seas whaler that had been a prize to the French privateer Minerve.

The three unburnt vessels arrived at Plymouth on 14 August. The four vessels Gironde had captured were:

- Swan sloop, Andrew Miller, master, from Oporto and carrying wine; (Note: A Portuguese vessel recaptured Swan and sent her into Lisbon.)
- Countess of Lauderdale, Thomas Bennett, master, from Demerary, carrying sugar and cotton;
- Active brig, Benjamin Tucker, master, from Bermuda, carrying sugar and cotton; and
- Young William, Charles Bacon, master, returning from the South Sea's with a cargo of (whale) oil. (Note: Young William was recaptured and sent into Cork.)

On 30 September Fisgard captured the Spanish naval brig Vivo, of fourteen 18-pounder carronades and with a crew of 100 men. She was two days out of Ferrol and carrying dispatches and orders to America. She threw the dispatches, etc., overboard during the chase.

On 15 May 1801 Fisgard, and the hired armed cutters Hirondelle and Earl Spencer, recaptured the brig Victory from the French. Then on 7 July Fisgard was at Plymouth when the gun-vessel HMS Augustus ran aground under the Royal Citadel, Plymouth. Fisgard sent her boats to assist and the crew and some of the stores were saved, but the vessel herself was a wreck.

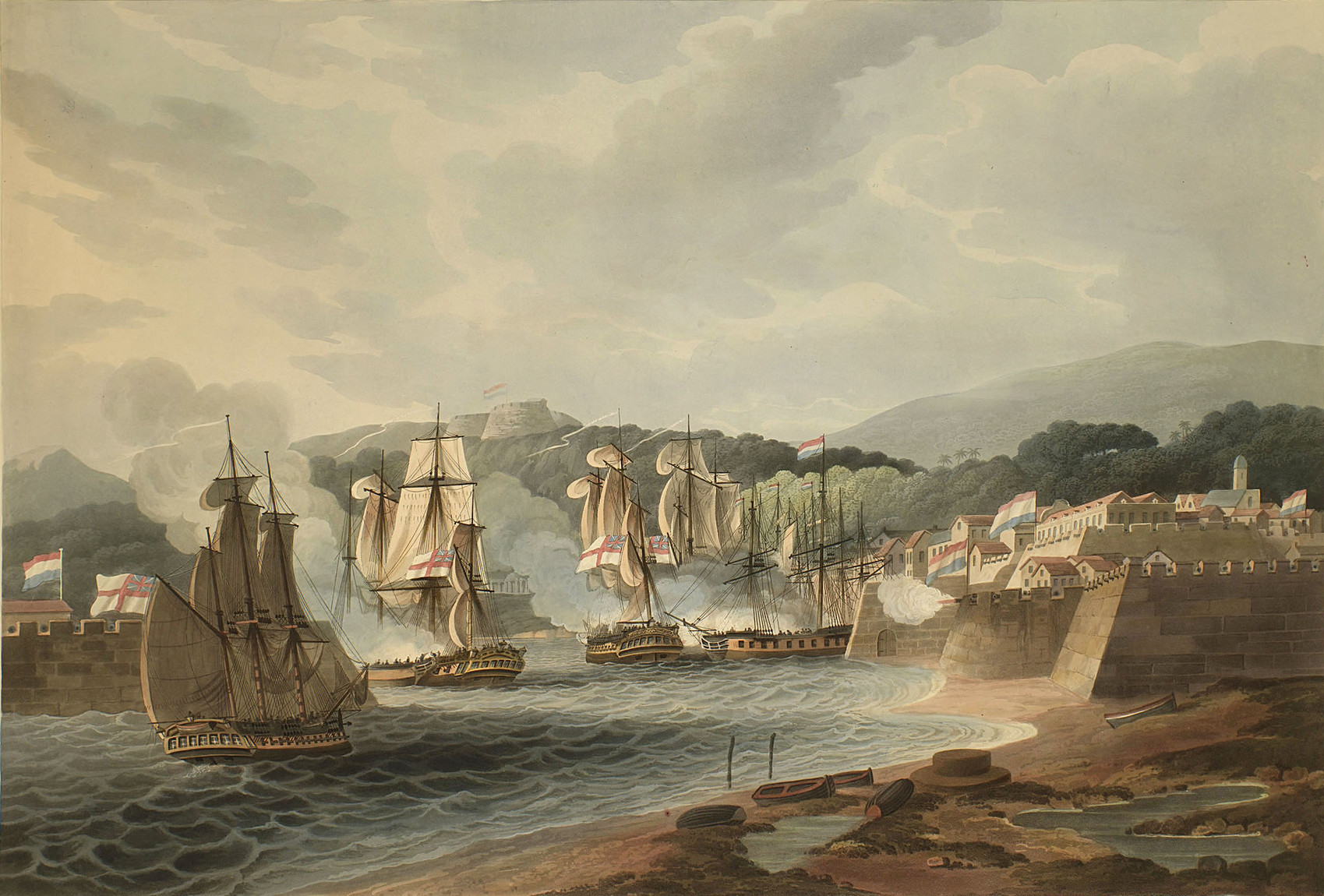
The taking of Curaçao, by Charles Brisbane and the officers under his command, commanding H.M.Arathusa, Latona, Anson, and Fisguard 1 January 1807

In December 1804 Fisgard was at 37°00′N 13°40′W when she captured the French letter of marque Tigre. Tigre was pierced for 16 guns and had 14 mounted: twelve 18-pounder carronades and two brass 4-pounder guns; she also had six 4-pounders in her hold. She had a crew of 40 men, and was ballasted with mahogany and die wood. She was 45 days into her voyage from Cayenne to Cadiz and on her way she had captured an English brig that had been sailing from London to Saint Michaels; the brig's master and crew were aboard Tigre. Tigre was the former Angola, of Liverpool. (Angola was a slave ship that had made four voyages carrying slaves from West Africa to the West Indies. The French had captured her in 1804 on her fifth voyage.)

On 17 November 1805 Fisgard collided with Ceres off Madeira, severely damaging her. Ceres was declared a total loss on her arrival at Barbados from London.

On 18 August 1806 Fisgard's boats went into Samaná Bay and there recaptured a British vessel that a French privateer of four guns and 100 men had captured on 7 August off Salt Island. The British vessel was Three Brothers, White, master, which had been sailing from Bermuda to St Thomas's and Honduras.

== Fate ==
The Principal Officers and Commissioners of the Royal Navy offered "Fisgard, of 38 guns and 1182 tons", lying at Portsmouth, for sale on 11 August 1814. The buyer had to post a bond of £3,000, with two guarantors, that the buyers would break up the vessel within a year of purchase.
