= French Revolutionary Legion =

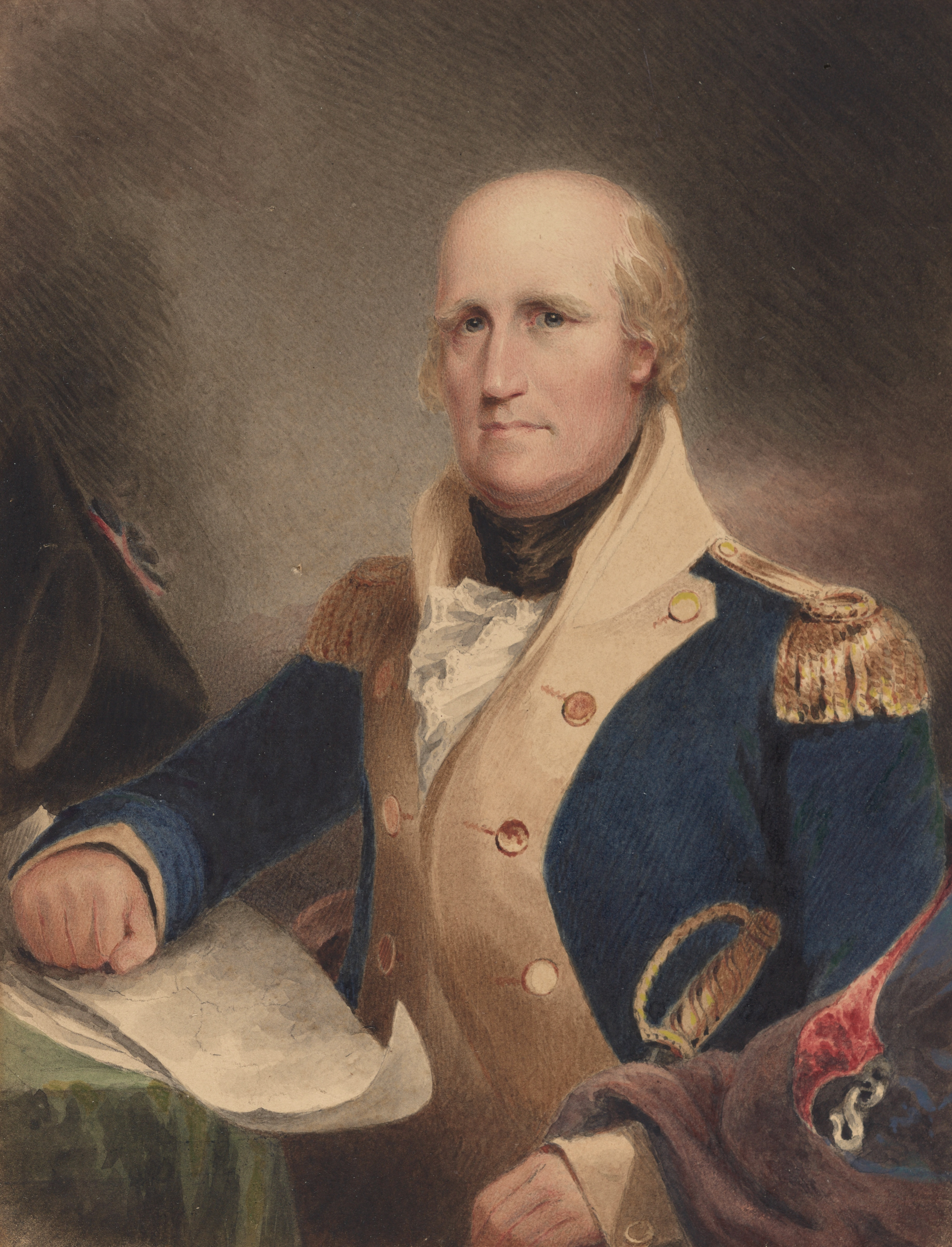
1825 portrait of George Rogers Clark by James Barton Longacre

The French Revolutionary Legion on the Mississippi was an American mercenary force commissioned by leaders of Revolutionary France in 1793. Its purpose was to reassert French influence in the North American interior, which was lost in the Treaty of Paris (1763).

== French Revolutionary Legion ==
Edmond-Charles Genêt, the French ambassador to the United States, created the French Revolutionary Legion in response to outrage against Spain. Genêt hoped to rally the ethnic French of the western United States, as well as traditional French allies among the Native American nations. Genêt sent André Michaux and two French artillery officers to Kentucky and commissioned George Rogers Clark as "Major General in the Armies of France and Commander-in-chief of the French Revolutionary Legion on the Mississippi River". Clark began to organize a campaign to seize New Madrid, St. Louis, Natchez, and New Orleans, in Louisiana, in order to gain free navigation on the Mississippi River. He also planned to add the "fair star of Canada". Genêt dispatched the Little Democrat to establish a blockade at New Orleans. Clark won the tacit support of Kentucky governor Isaac Shelby, who when pressed by the Washington administration to arrest Clark, responded with doubts that he had "any legal authority to restrain or to punish them." Thomas Jefferson officially protested the Legion's violation of U.S. neutrality, but suggested that the campaign would be in the best interests of the United States. Clark advertised in the Centinel of the Northwest Territory that anyone who served with the French Legion would be granted 1,000 to 3,000 acres of conquered lands, depending on the years of service; and all plunder would be divided. Clark was able to raise two infantry regiments, and was prepared to launch his campaign when it was cancelled by another French official.

President George Washington was angered by Genêt's lack of diplomatic tact, and demanded his recall in December 1793. In February 1794, a new ambassador from France, Jean Antoine Joseph Fauchet, arrived in Philadelphia with an arrest warrant for Genêt. On March 4, Fauchet issued an order cancelling the expedition into Louisiana. Clark and Shelby continued their preparations, however, so President Washington issued a Proclamation of Neutrality on March 24 which forbade Americans from invading Spain. On March 31, Secretary of War Henry Knox ordered General Anthony Wayne to build a fortification on the site of Fort Massac to stop the expedition. Wayne sent a company of infantry and some artillery to Fort Massac in May after receiving word that Spain had sent five gunboats up the Mississippi to the Ohio River. The French government revoked the commissions granted to the Americans for the war against Spain. By July, the French Revolutionary Legion had dispersed. Clark's planned campaign collapsed, and he was unable to convince the French to reimburse him for his expenses.

Brigadier General James Wilkinson, second-in-command of the Legion of the United States, and an agent for the Spanish crown, claimed credit for undermining Clark and for preventing supplies from being shipped down the Ohio River. He submitted receipts of $8,640 to Spanish Governor Carondelet for his efforts.

France issued a new commission to Clark in 1796. The plan to invade Louisiana was revisited in 1798, but failed to yield any results. The French First Republic, under Napoleon Bonaparte, gained possession of the territory in the 1800 Third Treaty of San Ildefonso. It was purchased by the United States in 1803.

== American Revolutionary Legion ==
In October 1793, a similar force was raised in South Carolina. French Consul Michel Ange Bernard Mangourit wanted to capture Florida from Spain and then assist Clark in the invasion of Louisiana. He commissioned William Tate as a French Colonel to lead this force. Tate's deputy commander was Stephen Drayton, the personal secretary to Governor William Moultrie. Tate was instructed to recruit from outside the United States, but he recruited from the region of the Carolinas, especially rural settlers. He is known to have attracted sixty-six officers, but claimed to have raised more than 2,000 volunteers. Like Clark, Tate's commission was rescinded by Fauchet. South Carolina threatened to arrest Tate for treason, and he fled to France in 1795, where he was given command of the Légion Noire during the 1797 invasion of Britain that ended with the Battle of Fishguard.
