= War of the First Coalition =

1792–1797 wars between France and European powers

- Part of the French Revolutionary Wars and the Coalition Wars
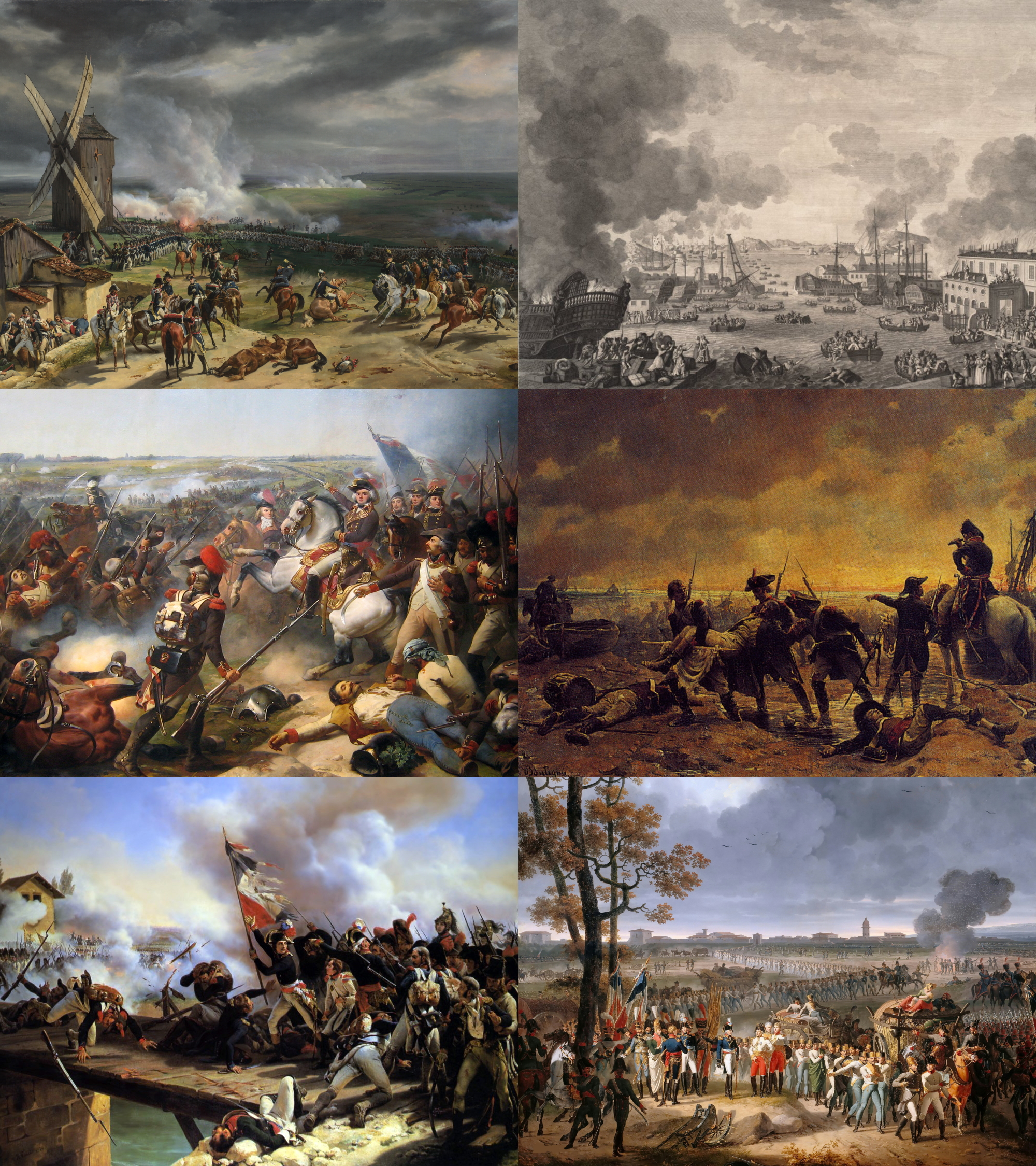
- War of the first coalition Click an image to load the appropriate article. Left to right, top to bottom: Battles of Valmy, Toulon, Fleurus, Quiberon, Arcole and Mantua
Date	20 April 1792 – 17 October 1797 (5 years, 5 months, 3 weeks and 6 days)
Location	France, Central Europe, Italy, the Low Countries, Spain, West Indies
Result	French victory; Treaty of The Hague, Treaty of Paris, Peaces of Basel, Treaty of Tolentino, Treaty of Campo Formio
Territorial changes	French annexation of the Austrian Netherlands, the Left Bank of the Rhine, Savoy, and other smaller territories; Santo Domingo to France; French sister republics established; End of millennial Venetian independence

Belligerents
First Coalition; Holy Roman Empire (Note: Nominally the Holy Roman Empire, under Austrian rule, also encompassed many other Italian states, such as the Duchy of Modena, Grand Duchy of Tuscany, and the Duchy of Massa. Left the war after signing the Treaty of Campo Formio with France.): Austria (until 1797); Prussia (until 1795) (Note: Left the war after signing the Peace of Basel with France.); Piedmont-Sardinia (until 1796) (Note: Left the war after signing the Treaty of Paris with France.); (Province of Hanover) Hanover; Saxony; Bavaria; Hesse-Kassel; Great Britain (Note: Including the Army of Condé. Britain was in personal union with the Electorate of Hanover which was also part of the Holy Roman Empire. Its troops operated under British command.); Dutch Republic (until 1795) (Note: Left the war after signing the Treaty of The Hague (1795) with France.) (Kingdom of France) French Royalists: Vendeans; Spain (until 1795); Portugal; Naples (until 1796); Papal States (until 1797)	Kingdom of France (until 1792); French Republic (from 1792); United Irishmen (From 1796); French satellites (Note: Including the Polish Legions formed in French-allied Italy in 1797, following the abolition of the Polish–Lithuanian Commonwealth after the Third Partition in 1795.): Batavian Republic (from 1795) (Note: The French Revolutionary Army and Dutch revolutionaries overthrew the Dutch Republic and established the Batavian Republic as a puppet state in its place.); Sister republics (Note: Various conquered Italian states, including the Cisalpine Republic from 1797); French naval allies: Spain (from 1796, naval only) (Note: Re-entered the war against Britain as an ally of France after signing the Second Treaty of San Ildefonso.)

Commanders and leaders
(Holy Roman Empire) Francis II; (Kingdom of Great Britain) George III; (Kingdom of Great Britain) William Pitt; (Spain) Charles IV (until 1795); (Kingdom of Naples) Ferdinand I; (Kingdom of Prussia) Frederick William II; (Kingdom of Prussia) Charles Ferdinand	Louis XVI (executed); (French First Republic) Jacques Brissot (executed); (French First Republic) Maximilien Robespierre (executed); (French First Republic) Napoleon Bonaparte; (French First Republic) Paul Barras (from 1795)

Strength
1793: (Holy Roman Empire) 800,000+; 500,000; 65,000; (Dutch Republic) 60,000; (Kingdom of France) 25,000; (Kingdom of Great Britain) 20,000	1794: (French First Republic) 1,169,000

Casualties and losses
Austria; 94,000 soldiers killed ~188,000 died of disease 220,000 captured 100,000 wounded	(French First Republic) French Republic; 100,000 soldiers killed ~200,000 died of disease 150,000 captured

Coalition Wars
List of numbered map items:
1 First Coalition: France 1792:...Valmy...
2 Second Coalition: Egypt 1798:...Pyramids...
3 Second Coalition: Italy 1799:...Marengo...
4 Third Coalition: Germany 1803:...Austerlitz...
5 Fourth Coalition: Prussia 1806:...Jena...
6 Fifth Coalition: Austria 1809:...Wagram...
7 Sixth Coalition: Germany 1813:...Leipzig...
8 Sixth Coalition: France 1814:...Paris...
9 Seventh Coalition: Belgium 1815:...Waterloo...

The War of the First Coalition (French: Guerre de la première coalition) was a set of wars between a coalition of several European powers and France fought from 1792 to 1797. (Note: initially against the constitutional Kingdom of France and then the French Republic that succeeded it) The coalition was only loosely allied and fought without much coordination; each power wanted to annex a different part of France should they defeat the French, something that never occurred.

Relations between the French revolutionaries and neighbouring monarchies had deteriorated following the Declaration of Pillnitz in August 1791. Eight months later, following a vote by the revolutionary-led Legislative Assembly, France declared war on Austria on 20 April 1792; Prussia, having allied with Austria in February, declared war on France in June 1792. In July 1792, an army under the Duke of Brunswick and composed mostly of Prussians joined the Austrian side and invaded France. The capture of Verdun (2 September 1792) triggered the September massacres in Paris. France counterattacked with victory at Valmy (20 September) and two days later the National Convention, which had replaced the Legislative Assembly, proclaimed the French Republic.

Subsequently, the coalition invaded France by land and sea, in association with Prussia and Austria attacking from the Austrian Netherlands and the Rhine, and Great Britain supporting revolts in provincial France and laying siege to Toulon in October 1793. France suffered reversals (Battle of Neerwinden, 18 March 1793) and internal strife (War in the Vendée) and responded with draconian measures. The Committee of Public Safety was formed (6 April 1793) and the levée en masse drafted all men aged 18 to 25 into the army (August 1793). The new French armies counterattacked, repelled the invaders, and advanced beyond France.

The French established the Batavian Republic as a sister republic (May 1795) in place of the defeated Dutch Republic and gained Prussian recognition of French control of the Left Bank of the Rhine by the first Peace of Basel. With the Treaty of Campo Formio, Austria ceded the Austrian Netherlands to France and Northern Italy was turned into several French sister republics. Spain made a separate peace accord with France (Second Treaty of Basel) and the French Directory annexed more of the Holy Roman Empire.

North of the Alps, Archduke Charles, Duke of Teschen defeated the invading armies during the Rhine campaign, but Napoleon Bonaparte succeeded against Sardinia and Austria in northern Italy (1796–1797) near the Po Valley, culminating in the Peace of Leoben and the Treaty of Campo Formio (October 1797). The First Coalition collapsed, leaving only Britain in the field fighting against France.

== Background ==
As early as 1791, other monarchies in Europe were watching the developments in France with alarm, and considered intervening, either in support of Louis XVI or to take advantage of the chaos in France. The key figure, Leopold II, Holy Roman Emperor, brother of the French Queen Marie Antoinette, had initially looked on the Revolution calmly. He became increasingly concerned as the Revolution grew more radical, although he still hoped to avoid war.

On 27 August 1791, Leopold and King Frederick William II of Prussia, in consultation with émigré French nobles, issued the Declaration of Pillnitz, which declared the concern of the monarchs of Europe for the well-being of Louis and his family, and threatened vague but severe consequences if anything should befall them. Although Leopold saw the Pillnitz Declaration as a way of taking action that would enable him to avoid actually doing anything about France, at least for the moment, Paris saw the Declaration as a serious threat and the revolutionary leaders denounced it.

In addition to the ideological differences between the French revolutionaries and the European monarchies, disputes continued over the status of Imperial estates in Alsace, and the French authorities became concerned about the agitation of émigré nobles abroad, especially in the Austrian Netherlands and in the minor states of Germany. In the end, France declared war on Austria first, with the Assembly voting for war on 20 April 1792, after the presentation of a long list of grievances by the newly appointed foreign minister Charles François Dumouriez, who sought a war which might restore some popularity and authority to the King.

== 1792 ==
=== Invasion of the Austrian Netherlands ===
Dumouriez prepared an invasion of the Austrian Netherlands, where he expected the local population to rise against Austrian rule. However, the revolution had thoroughly disorganized the French army, which had insufficient forces for the invasion. Its soldiers fled at the first sign of battle, deserting en masse, in one case murdering General Théobald Dillon. The French soldiers were insulted, hissed, even assaulted. The situation of the Flanders Campaign was alarming.

While the revolutionary government frantically raised fresh troops and reorganized its armies, an allied army under Charles William Ferdinand, Duke of Brunswick assembled at Koblenz on the Rhine. The invasion commenced in July 1792. The Duke then issued a declaration on 25 July 1792, which had been written by the brothers of Louis XVI, that declared his [Brunswick's] intent to restore the King of France to his full powers, and to treat any person or town who opposed him as rebels to be condemned to death by martial law. This motivated the revolutionary army and government to oppose the Prussian invaders by any means necessary, and led almost immediately to the overthrow of the King by a crowd which stormed the Tuileries Palace.

=== Prussian progress ===
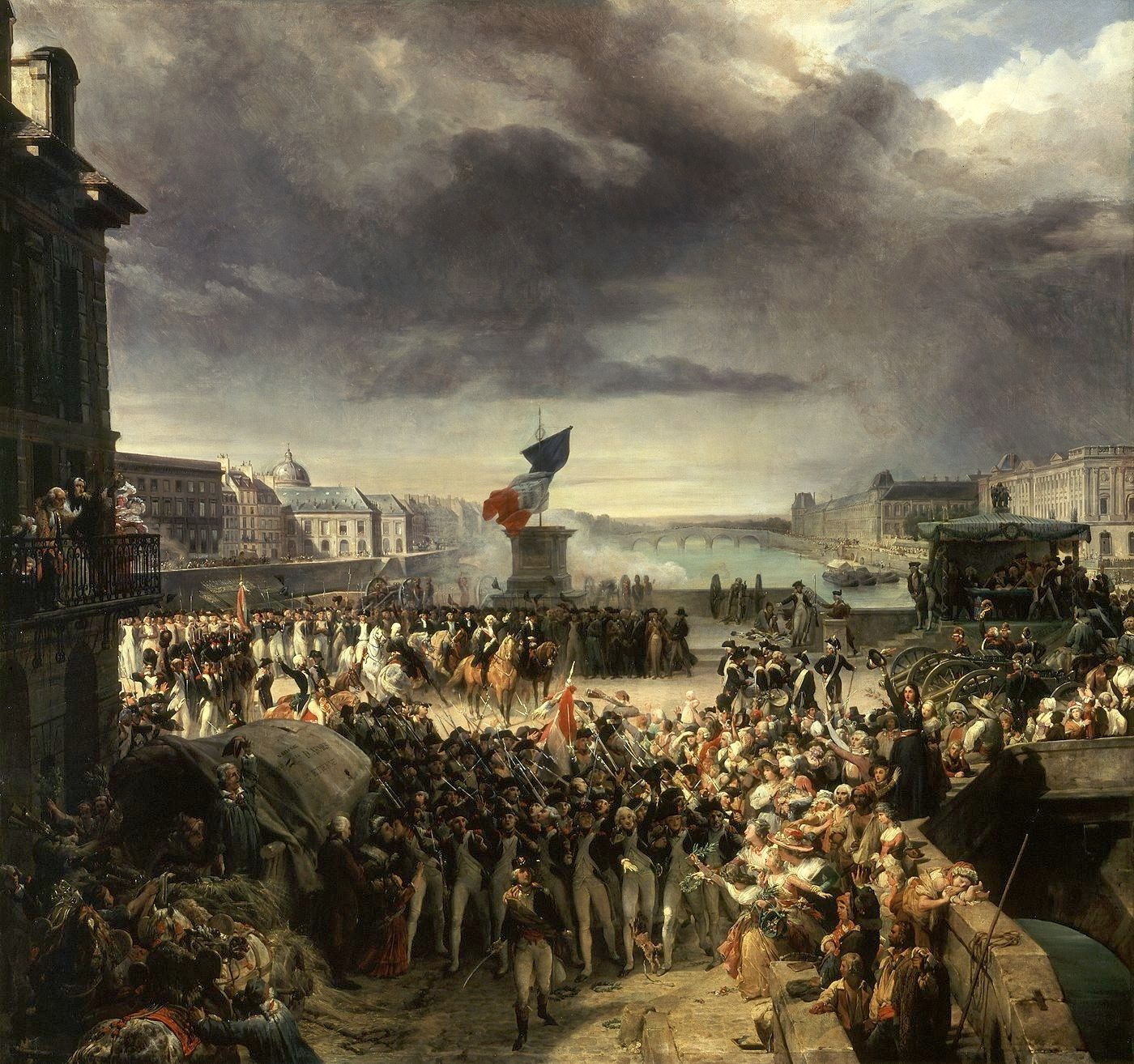
The National Guard of Paris Departs for the Army by Léon Cogniet

Brunswick's army, composed mostly of Prussian veterans, crossed into French territory on 19 August and easily took the fortresses of Longwy and Verdun. But at the Battle of Valmy on 20 September 1792 they came to a stalemate against Dumouriez and Kellermann in which the highly professional French artillery distinguished itself. Although the battle was a tactical draw, it bought time for the revolutionaries and gave a great boost to French morale. Furthermore, the Prussians, facing a campaign longer and more costly than predicted, decided against the cost and risk of continued fighting and determined to retreat from France to preserve their army.

=== Fronts in Italy and Germany ===
Meanwhile, the French had been successful on several other fronts, occupying the Duchy of Savoy and the County of Nice until the Massif de l'Authion, while General Custine invaded Germany, capturing Speyer, Worms and Mainz along the Rhine, and reaching as far as Frankfurt. Dumouriez went on the offensive in the Austrian Netherlands once again, winning a great victory over the Austrians at Jemappes on 6 November 1792, and occupying the entire country by the beginning of winter.

== 1793 ==
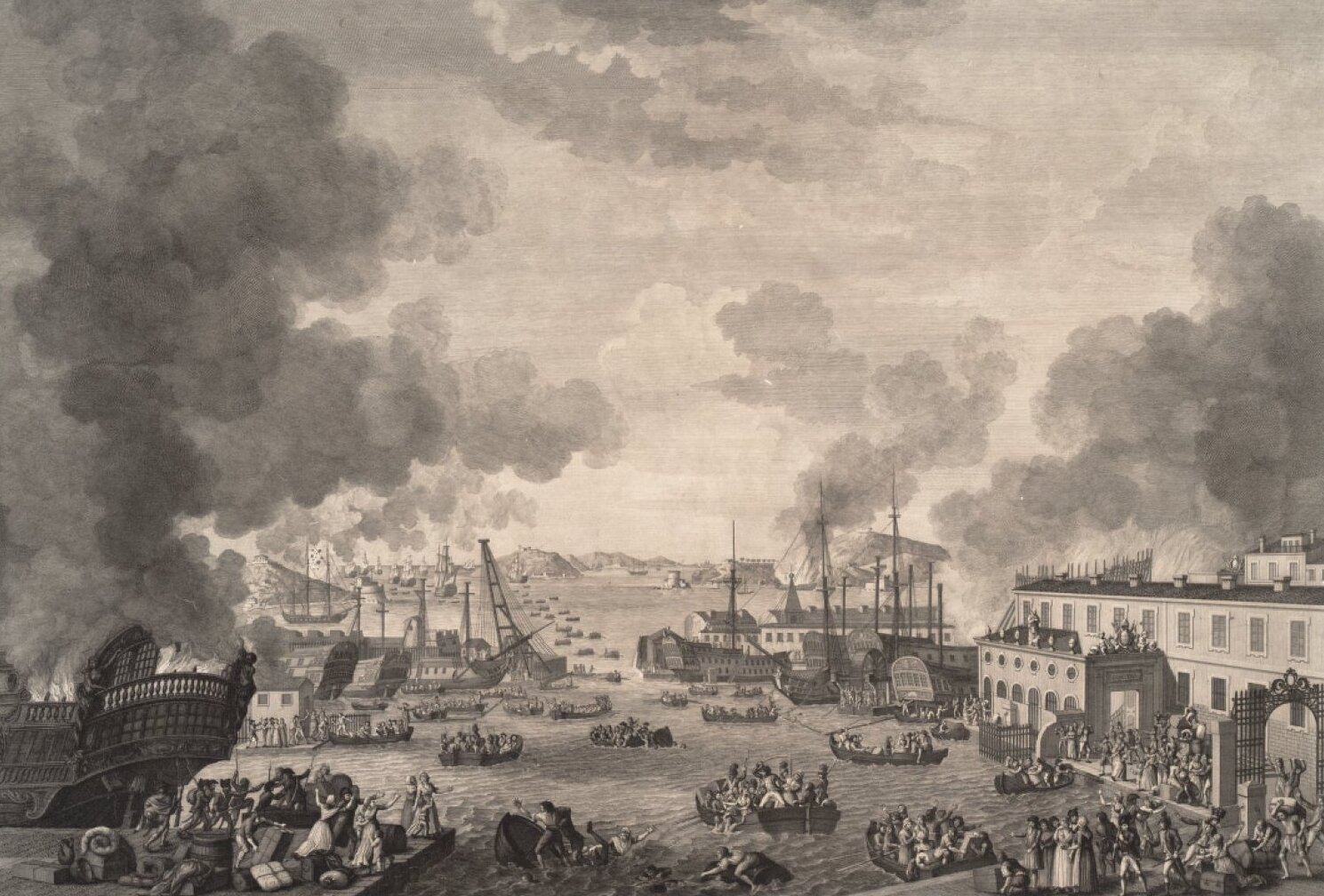
The Allied evacuation of Toulon in December 1793

On 21 January the revolutionary government executed Louis XVI after a trial. This united all European governments, including Spain, Naples & Sicily, and the Netherlands against the Revolution. France declared war against Britain and the Netherlands on 1 February 1793 and soon afterwards against Spain. In the course of the year 1793 the Holy Roman Empire (on 23 March), the kings of Portugal and Naples, and the Grand Duke of Tuscany declared war against France. Thus the First Coalition was formed.

=== Introduction of conscription ===
France introduced a new levy of hundreds of thousands of men, beginning a French policy of using levée en masse (mass conscription) to deploy more of its manpower than the other states could, and remaining on the offensive so that these mass armies could commandeer war material from the territory of their enemies. The Girondin faction of the French government sent Citizen Genet to the United States to encourage them to enter the war on France's side. The newly formed nation refused, and the Washington administration's 1793 Proclamation of Neutrality threatened legal action against any citizen providing assistance to any side in the conflict.

After a victory in the Battle of Neerwinden in March, the Austrians suffered twin defeats at the battles of Wattignies and Wissembourg. British land forces were defeated at the Battle of Hondschoote in September.

== 1794 ==
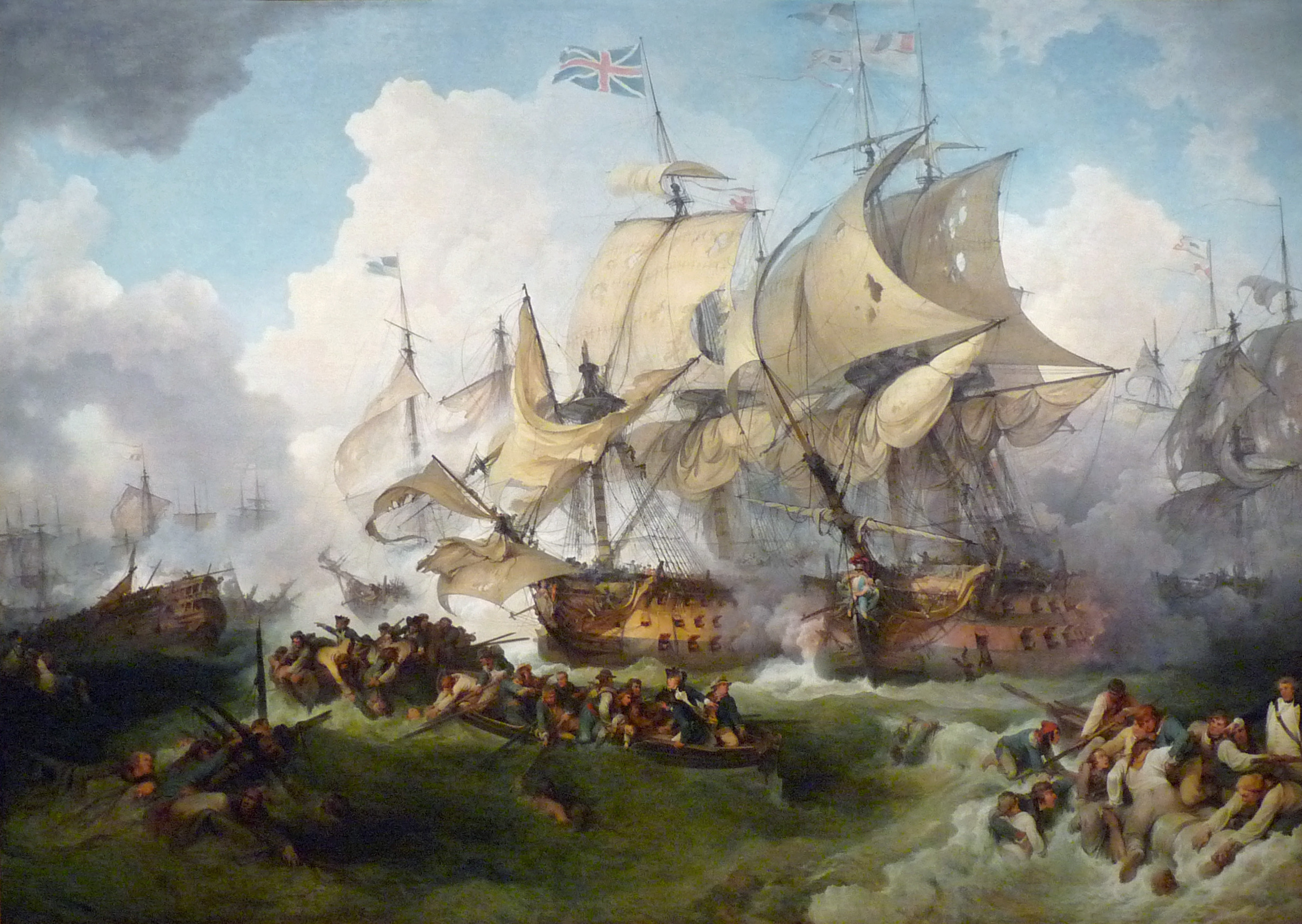
Lord Howe's action or The Glorious First of June. Oil painting by Philip James de Loutherbourg (1795), National Maritime Museum.

=== Battle of Fleurus ===
1794 brought increased success to the revolutionary armies. A major victory against combined coalition forces at the Battle of Fleurus gained all of the Austrian Netherlands and the Rhineland for France. Although the British navy maintained its supremacy at sea, it was unable to support effectively any land operations after the fall of the Belgian provinces. The Prussians were slowly driven out of the eastern provinces and by the end of the year they had retired from any active part in the war. Against Spain, the French made successful incursions into both Catalonia and Navarre in the War of the Pyrenees.

=== Actions in the West Indies ===
Action extended into the French colonies in the West Indies. A British fleet occupied Martinique, St. Lucia, and Guadeloupe, although a French fleet arrived later in the year and recovered the latter by ousting the invaders.

=== Prussian withdrawal ===
Prussia had entered the war hoping for a quick territorial expansion, and was not prepared for an extended conflict as its position was weak from the start. While it had not actually entered battle, the Prussian army had been mobilized and then demobilized twice in the preceding two years – in face-offs against Austria in 1790 (in which 160,000 soldiers were assembled) and Russia in 1791 – which left the kingdom's treasury nearly empty after the third mobilization against France in 1792. The Prussians in 1792 suffered no major battlefield reversals but their poorly-planned march was devastated by disease and desertion; of the 42,000 Prussian soldiers who entered France as part of the coalition in that year (one of their two major thrusts along with the comparable force in the Low Countries), less than 20,000 recrossed the frontier and more than half of those were sick. A Prussian soldier who was later to live through the French invasion of Russia wrote that the Prussian retreat from Champagne in 1792 was perhaps a more terrible sight than even the wreck of the Grande Armée in 1812. Losses in the Low Countries in 1793 and 1794 added to the state's strain.

Compounding all these issues was that the Prussian army was essentially split between two fronts: waging war against France in the west, and securing their gains in the Partitions of Poland (1792–1795) in the east (the Kościuszko Uprising would break out between the Second and Third Partitions). Recognizing that his kingdom could not afford to fight a long two-front war, Frederick William II sought to extricate his domains from the potentially disastrous conflict with the republic. He ceased any notable operations in 1794 and fully withdrew from the conflict by 1795. The Treaty of Basel, signed 17 May 1795, cost Prussia its territories on the left bank of the Rhine but otherwise minimized losses; France agreed to withdraw from territories east of the Rhine and recognize Prussian gains in Poland and hegemony over the small north German states. While dominant in its sphere, Prussia left the war bankrupt and diplomatically isolated from its former allies; it would not attempt to war against France again until the War of the Fourth Coalition in 1806, after a long recuperation.

== 1795 ==
=== French capture of the Low Countries ===
After seizing the Low Countries in a surprise winter attack, France established the Batavian Republic as a puppet state. Even before the close of 1794 Prussia retired from any active part in the war, and on 5 April 1795 King Frederick William II concluded with France the Peace of Basel, which recognized France's occupation of the left bank of the Rhine. The new French-dominated Dutch government bought peace by surrendering Dutch territory to the south of that river. A treaty of peace between France and Spain followed in July. The grand duke of Tuscany had been admitted to terms in February. The coalition thus fell into ruin and France proper would be free from invasion for many years.

=== Battle of Quiberon ===
Britain attempted to reinforce the rebels in the Vendée by landing French Royalist troops at Quiberon, but failed, and attempts to overthrow the government in Paris by force were foiled by the military garrison led by Napoleon Bonaparte, leading to the establishment of the Directory.

=== Battle of Mainz ===
On the Rhine frontier, General Pichegru, negotiating with the exiled Royalists, betrayed his army and forced the evacuation of Mannheim and the failure of the siege of Mainz by Jourdan.

== 1796 ==
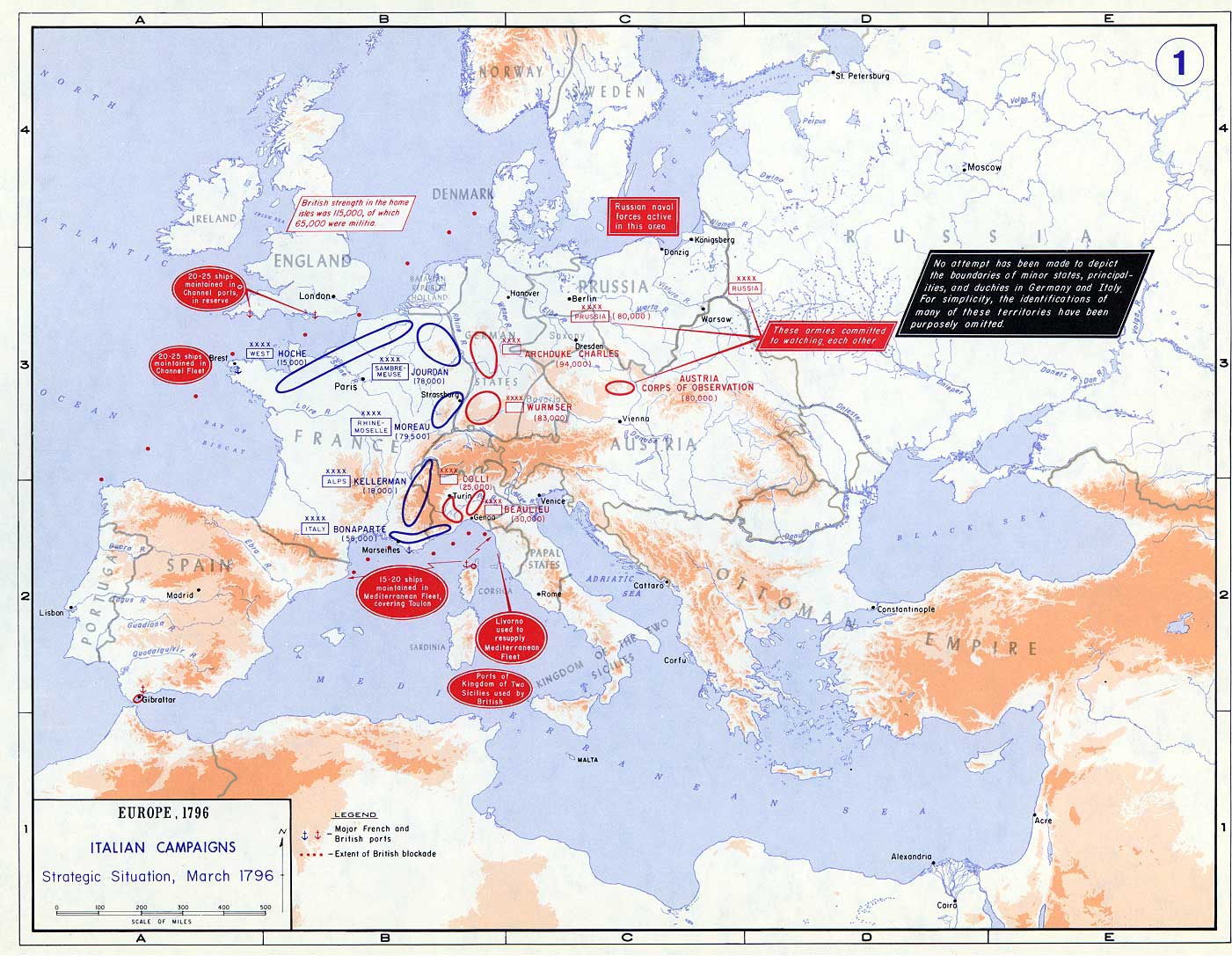
Strategic situation in Europe in 1796

The French prepared a great advance on three fronts, with Jourdan and Jean Victor Marie Moreau on the Rhine and the newly promoted Napoleon Bonaparte in Italy. The three armies were to link up in Tyrol and march on Vienna.

=== Rhine campaign ===
In the Rhine campaign of 1796, Jourdan and Moreau crossed the Rhine river and advanced into Germany. Jourdan advanced as far as Amberg in late August while Moreau reached Bavaria and the edge of Tyrol by September. However Jourdan was defeated by Archduke Charles, Duke of Teschen and both armies were forced to retreat back across the Rhine.

=== Invasion of Italy ===
Napoleon, on the other hand, was successful in a daring invasion of Italy. In the Montenotte Campaign, he separated the armies of Sardinia and Austria, defeating each one in turn, and then forced a peace on Sardinia. Following this, his army captured Milan and started the Siege of Mantua. Bonaparte defeated successive Austrian armies sent against him under Johann Peter Beaulieu, Dagobert Sigmund von Wurmser and József Alvinczi while continuing the siege.

=== End of the War of the Vendée ===
The rebellion in the Vendée was also crushed in 1796 by Louis Lazare Hoche. Hoche's subsequent attempt to land a large invasion force in Munster to aid the United Irishmen was unsuccessful.

== 1797 ==
=== Battle of Mantua ===
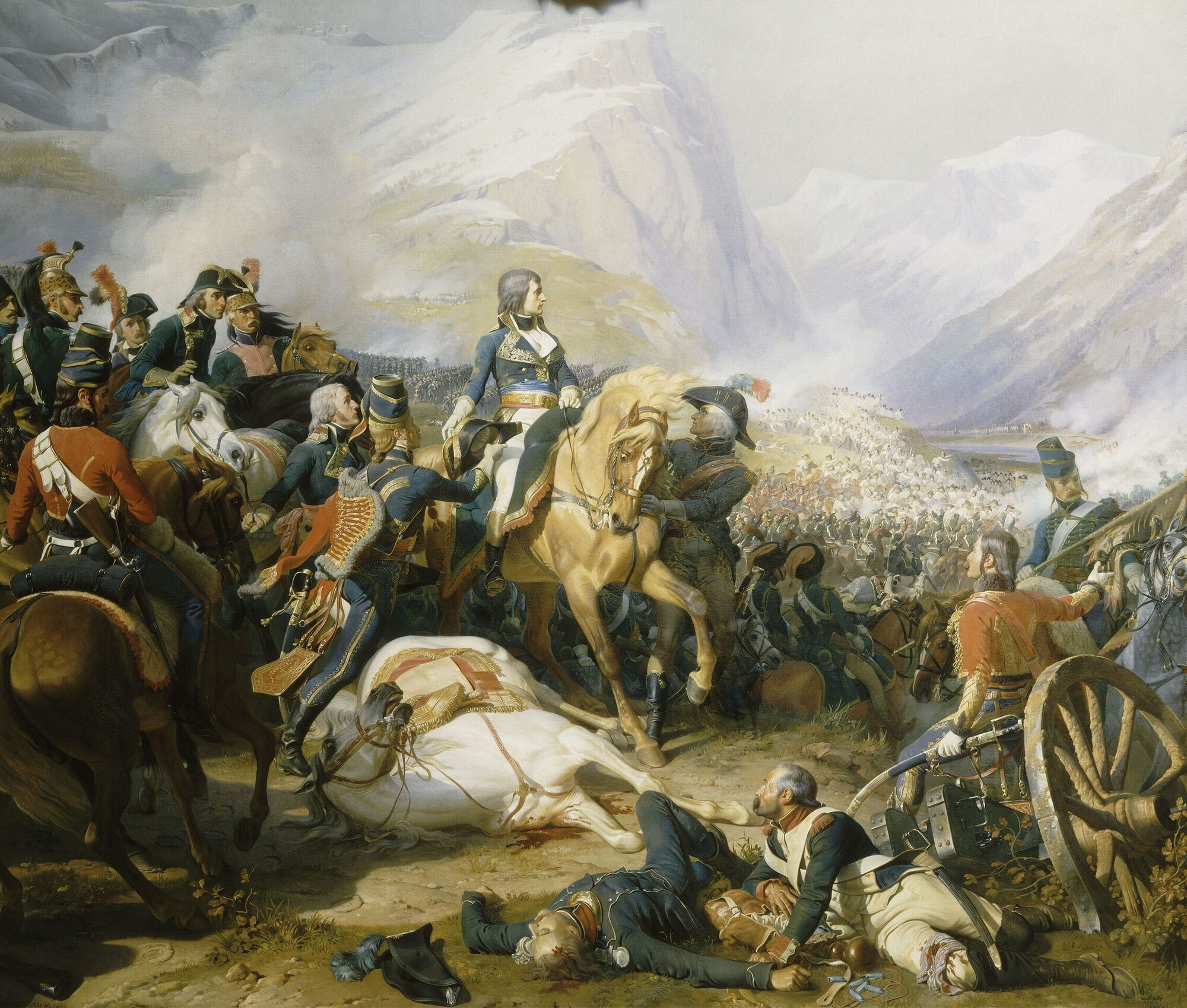
Napoleon at the Battle of Rivoli, 14 January 1797. Oil painting The Battle of Rivoli by Henri Félix Emmanuel Philippoteaux (1844), Palace of Versailles.

On 2 February Napoleon finally captured Mantua, with the Austrians surrendering 18,000 men. Archduke Charles of Austria was unable to stop Napoleon from invading the Tyrol, and the Austrian government sued for peace in April. At the same time, there was a new French invasion of Germany under Moreau and Hoche.

=== Invasion of Great Britain ===
On 22 February, a French invasion force consisting of 1,400 troops from the Légion Noire (Black Legion) under the command of Irish American Colonel William Tate landed near Fishguard in Wales. They were met by a quickly assembled group of around 500 British reservists, militia and sailors under the command of John Campbell, 1st Baron Cawdor. After brief clashes with the local civilian population and Lord Cawdor's forces on 23 February, Tate was forced into an unconditional surrender by 24 February. This would be the only battle fought on British soil during the Revolutionary Wars.

=== Austrian peace ===
Austria signed the Treaty of Campo Formio in October, ceding Belgium to France and recognizing French control of the Rhineland and much of Italy. The ancient Republic of Venice was partitioned between Austria and France. This ended the War of the First Coalition, although Great Britain and France remained at war.

== See also ==
- List of battles of the War of the First Coalition
- War of the Second Coalition
- Coalition forces of the Napoleonic Wars

== Notes ==
Preceded by Siege of Namur (1792)	French Revolution: Revolutionary campaigns War of the First Coalition	Succeeded by War in the Vendée
