= Invasion of Wales =

Invasion of Wales may refer to several invasions of Wales including:

- Norman invasion of Wales
- French invasion of Wales (1797)

For larger invasions of the whole of Great Britain see Invasion of Great Britain
