= Spanish brig Vivo =

History

Spain
- Name: Vivo
- Builder: Cadiz
- Launched: 1794
- Captured: 30 September 1800

Great Britain
- Name: HMS Galgo
- Acquired: 1800 by capture
- Fate: Sold 7 September 1801

General characteristics
- Tons burthen: 21614/94 bm
- Length: Overall: 80 ft 10 1/4 in (24.6 m); Keel: 60 ft 6 in (18.4 m)
- Beam: 25 ft 11 in (7.9 m)
- Depth of hold: 10 ft 4 in (3.1 m)
- Sail plan: Brig
- Complement: Spanish service:100; British service:67 men
- Armament: Spanish service: 14 × 8-pounder guns; British service: 14 × 18-pounder carronades

The Spanish brig Vivo, of the Spanish Royal Navy, was launched at Cadiz in 1794 (or possibly 1788).

On 30 September 1800 HMS Fisgard captured the Spanish naval brig Vivo, of fourteen 18-pounder carronades and with a crew of 100 men. She was two days out of Ferrol and carrying dispatches and orders to America. She threw the dispatches, etc., overboard during the chase. (Note: Although the letter in the London Gazette announcing the capture referred to Vivo's armament as consisting of fourteen 18-pounder carronades, other news accounts gave the armament as fourteen 8-pounder guns.) The Spanish brig "Vida", from Ferrol and prize to Fisgard, arrived at Plymouth on 9 October. She was immediately laid up in ordinary. The British Royal Navy named and registered her, but never commissioned her. The "Principal officers and commissioners of His Majesty's Navy" offered El Vroo for sale on 24 August 1801. She sold on 7 September for £865 or £860.
