= William Tate (soldier) =

Irish-American military commander of La Légion Noire ("The Black Legion")

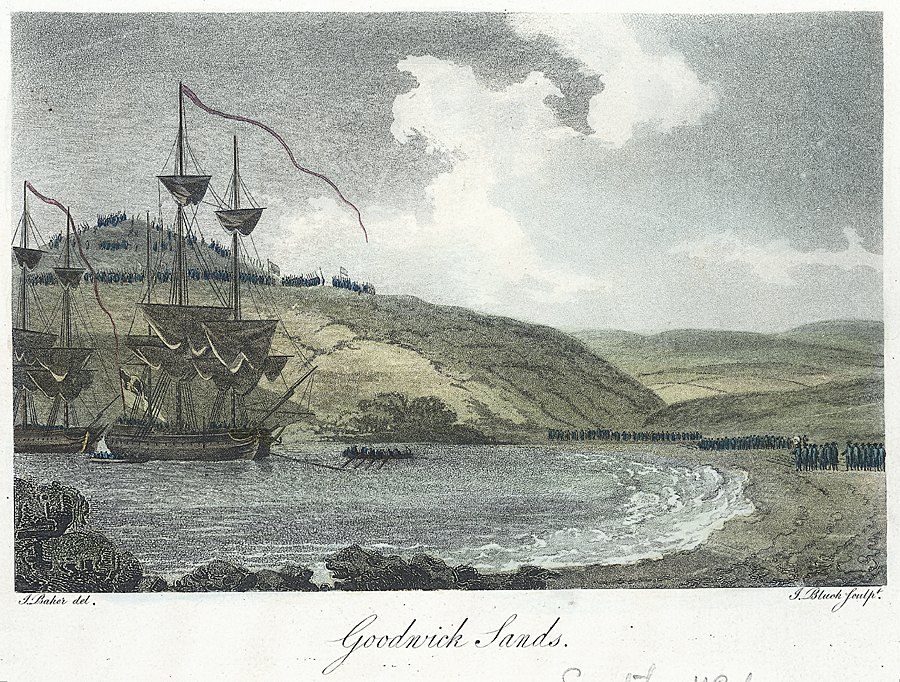
- The Battle of Fishguard, where Tate surrendered
- Born: 1744; Ireland
- Died: Unknown Unknown
- Allegiance: France
- Branch: French Army
- Service years: 1797
- Rank: Chef de brigade
- Commands: Légion Noire
- Conflicts: French Revolutionary Wars: Battle of Fishguard

Chef de brigade William Tate was the Irish-born American commander of a French invasion force known as La Légion Noire ("The Black Legion") which invaded Britain in 1797, resulting in the Battle of Fishguard.

In 1793, French Consul Michel Ange Bernard Mangourit wanted to capture Florida from Spain. He commissioned William Tate as a French Colonel to raise and lead a force of Americans. Tate was instructed to recruit from outside the United States, but he recruited from the region of the Carolinas, especially rural settlers. In February 1794, Jean Antoine Joseph Fauchet, arrived in Philadelphia as the new French ambassador, and rescinded Tate's commission.

South Carolina threatened to arrest Tate for treason, and he fled to France in 1795, where he was given command of the Légion Noire during the 1797 invasion of Britain. The 1,200 to 1,400-strong Légion Noire landed at Carregwastad Point, near the Welsh port of Fishguard, on February 22 but surrendered three days later at the Battle of Fishguard. After brief imprisonment, Tate was returned to France in a prisoner exchange in 1798, along with most of his invasion force. This was the last invasion of the British mainland by foreign forces.

Tate reportedly held a grudge against the British because his family had been killed by pro-British Native Americans in the American War of Independence, and he advocated Irish republicanism.

Many historians, following E. H. Stuart Jones, the author of The Last Invasion of Britain (1950), have suggested that William Tate was about 70 years old in 1797; he was in fact 44.
