= Vengeance-class frigate =

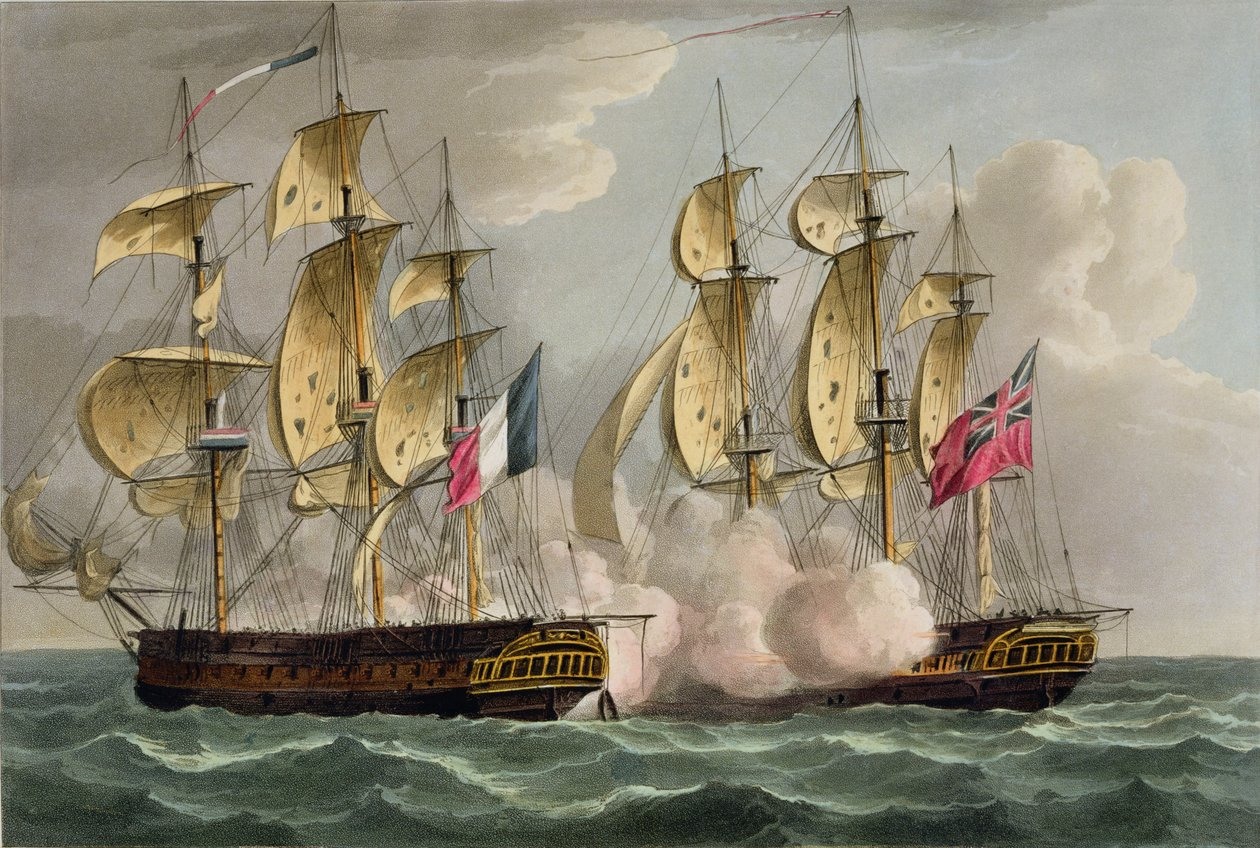
- Capture of Immortalité by HMS Fisgard (ex-Résistance).

Class overview
- Name: Vengeance class
- Builders: Paimbœuf
- Operators: French Navy; Royal Navy
- In commission: 1793–1814
- Completed: 2

General characteristics
- Class & type: 48-gun frigate
- Tons burthen: 800 tonnes
- Length: 48.7 m (159 ft 9 in)
- Beam: 12.7 m (41 ft 8 in)
- Draught: 6.4 m (21 ft 0 in)
- Sail plan: Full-rigged ship
- Armament: 28 × 18-pounder long guns; 12 × 8-pounder long guns; Further armament on castles

The Vengeance class was a type of large sailing frigates designed by Pierre Degay and built in Paimbœuf for the French Navy. Rated at 48 guns, the type was one of the French attempts at increasing the firepower of frigates by mounting a 24-pounder main battery, as was tried with Forfait's Romaine class. The attempt was unsuccessful, and the ships mounted 18-pounder long guns on their main gun deck while in service.

Only two ships of the design were built, both being captured by the British and recommissioned in the Royal Navy.

- Vengeance

Builder: Paimbœuf
Begun:June 1793
Launched: 8 November 1794
Completed: By April 1795
Fate: captured on 20 August 1800 by the Royal Navy. Sold in 1814.

- Résistance

Builder: Paimbœuf
Begun: April 1794
Launched: 28 November 1795
Completed: May 1796
Fate: captured on 9 March 1797 by the Royal Navy. Sold in 1814.
