= Angola (1799 ship) =

History

Great Britain
- Name: Angola
- Namesake: Angola
- Owner: 1799:Overend; 1800:Mullion & Co.
- Launched: 1799, Lancaster
- Captured: May 1804

France
- Name: Tigre
- Namesake: Tiger
- Acquired: 1804 by purchase of prize
- Captured: December 1804

General characteristics
- Tons burthen: 180, or 184 (bm)
- Complement: 1799:25; 1801:20; 1803:40; 1804:50; At capture:38–44; Tigre:40
- Armament: 1799: 18 × 4&6&9-pounder guns; 1801:18 × 4&6-pounder guns; 1803:16 × 6-pounder guns & 18-pounder carronades; 1804:16 × 6-pounder guns & 18-pounder carronades; At capture:18 × 6-pounder guns; Tigre:12 × 18-pounder carronades + 2 × brass 4-pounder chase guns

Angola was launched in 1799 at Lancaster. She became a Liverpool-based slave ship that had made four voyages in the triangular trade, carrying captives from West Africa to the West Indies. The French captured her in 1804 on her fifth voyage. Her captors renamed her Tigre, but the Royal Navy recaptured her late in 1804.

== Career ==
Angola first appeared in Lloyd's Register (LR) in 1799 with Williams, master, Overand, owner, and trade Lancaster–Africa.

=== 1st voyage transporting enslaved people (1799–1800) ===
Angola was registered on 21 June 1799 by a firm new to the slave trade. Captain William Williams acquired a letter of marque on 26 June 1799. A law passed by Parliament in 1799 permitted enslaving ships only to clear outbound from Bristol, Liverpool, and London. Williams sailed from Liverpool on 14 August, bound for the West Coast of Africa. In 1799, 156 vessels sailed from English ports bound for the trade in enslaved people; 134 of these vessels sailed from Liverpool.

Angola arrived at Trinidad on 1 March 1800, where she landed some 300 captives. She arrived back at Liverpool on 24 June 1800.

=== 2nd voyage transporting enslaved people (1800–1801) ===
Captain Charles King sailed from Liverpool on 13 November 1800, bound for The Gambia. In 1800, 133 vessels sailed from English ports bound for the trade in enslaved people; 120 of these vessels sailed from Liverpool.

Angola started acquiring captives on 5 December and arrived at St Vincent on 16 April 1801. There she landed 203 captives. She left St Vincent on 10 June and arrived back at Liverpool on 15 August. She had sailed with 26 crew members and suffered six crew deaths on her voyage.

Angola's owners went bankrupt in 1801 and she was sold to Liverpool.

=== 3rd voyage transporting enslaved people (1801–1802) ===
Captain Charles Boyes acquired a letter of marque on 26 September 1801. He sailed from Liverpool on 2 November. In 1801, 147 vessels sailed from English ports bound for the trade in enslaved people; 122 of these vessels sailed from Liverpool.

Angola arrived at The Gambia on 22 November. She arrived at Demerara on 23 March 1802 and landed 207 captives. She left on 13 April and arrived back at Liverpool on 6 June. She had left Liverpool with 25 crew members and she suffered eight crew deaths on her voyage.

=== 4th voyage transporting enslaved people (1802–1803) ===
Captain Charles Boys sailed from Liverpool on 21 July 1802, bound for the Sierra Leone Estuary. In 1802, 155 vessels sailed from English ports bound for the trade in enslaved people; 122 of these vessels sailed from Liverpool.

Angola arrived at Demerara on 1 March 1803, where she landed 216 captives. She sailed from Demerara on 20 April and arrived back at Liverpool on 6 June. She had left Liverpool with 23 crew members and had suffered three crew deaths on her voyage.

=== 5th voyage transporting enslaved people (1804–Capture) ===
Captain Thomas Phillips acquired a letter of marque on 27 July 1803, but the voyage did not take place. Captain Charles Boyes acquired a letter of marque 11 February 1804. Boyes sailed on 16 February 1804, bound for The Gambia. In 1804, 147 vessels sailed from English ports bound for the trade in enslaved people; 126 of these vessels sailed from Liverpool.

Lloyd's List (LL) reported in July 1804 that in May the French privateer Tigre, of four guns, had without firing a shot captured Angola, of 14 guns and 30 men. Tigre then took Angola into Senegal.

A later report did not name the captor, but reported that Angola had five men killed and that the French privateer had two men killed. A third report stated that action took place on 12 May. The French privateer was armed with eight guns and had a crew of 75 men. It stated that Angola had lost two men killed and four wounded out of a crew of 38. The French had four dead and wounded. Angola had 170 captives on board that she had been intending to carry to Charleston.

LR for 1805 had the annotation "captured" by the entry for her.

In 1804, 30 British vessels engaged in the triangular trade. Fifteen of these vessels were lost on their way to the West Indies from Africa. During the period 1793 to 1807, war, rather than maritime hazards or resistance by the captives, was the greatest cause of vessel losses among British enslaving vessels.

== Recapture ==
In December 1804 HMS Fisgard was at 37°00′N 13°40′W when she captured the French letter of marque Tigre. Tigre was pierced for 16 guns and had 14 mounted: twelve 18-pounder carronades and two brass 4-pounder guns; she also had six 4-pounders in her hold. She had a crew of 40 men, and was ballasted with mahogany and dye wood. She was 45 days into her voyage from Cayenne to Cadiz and on her way she had captured an English brig that had been sailing from London to Saint Michaels; the brig's master and crew were aboard Tigre. Tigre was the former Angola, of Liverpool.
