= HMS Augustus =

British navy barge

HMS Augustus (or Augusta) was a Thames sailing barge that the British Royal Navy purchased in 1795 and used as a gun-vessel of two or three guns. She was under the command of Lieutenant James Scott when she was wrecked at Plymouth on 7 July 1801.

The sailing barges had a crew of 19 men, generally under the command of a sailing master.

She had three commanders. In September 1796 Mr. J. Yates commissioned her. He commanded her through 1797. From 1798 to 1801 she was under the command of Mr. E.K. Foley.

On the morning of 7 July 1801 Augustus, which had been lying in the Cattewater, got under weigh for Cawsand Bay. As she was turning into Plymouth Sound she missed her stays and ran aground east of two gun batteries under the Citadel. HMS Fisgard sent her boats to assist. A dockyard launch also came alongside. Attempts were made to get Augustus off, but they failed and she started to break up. Her crew and some of the stores were saved. Next day dockyard vessels did succeed in pulling her off and in towing her to the Cattewater, but there she was declared a wreck.
