= Battle of Fishguard =

Part of the War of the First Coalition (1797)

- Part of the War of the First Coalition
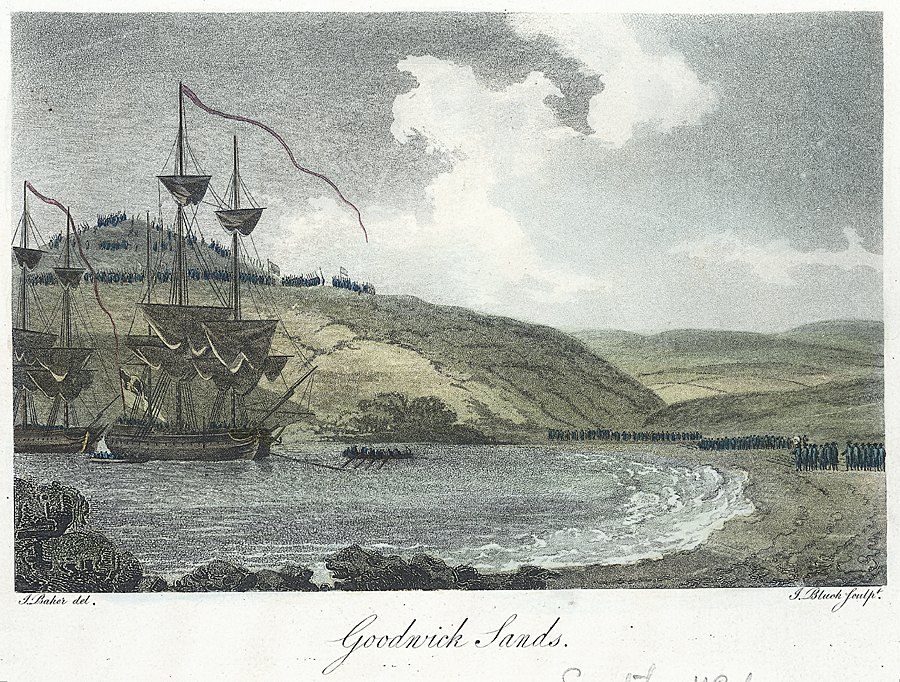
- Goodwick sands French troops surrender to British forces James Baker, 18th century
Date	22–24 February 1797
Location	Near Fishguard, Wales 51.9982°N 4.9804°W
Result	British victory

Belligerents
Great Britain	(French First Republic) France

Commanders and leaders
Lord Cawdor; Thomas Knox	William Tate (POW); Jean-Joseph Castagnier

Strength
300 reservists; 250 militia; 150 sailors	600 regulars; 800 irregulars; 2 frigates; 1 corvette; 1 lugger

Casualties and losses
Light	33 killed or wounded; 1,360 captured; 1 frigate captured; 1 corvette captured
- Location within the United Kingdom

The Battle of Fishguard was a military invasion of Great Britain by Revolutionary France during the War of the First Coalition. The brief campaign, on 22–24 February 1797, is the most recent landing on British soil by a hostile foreign force and thus is often referred to as the "last invasion of mainland Britain".

The French general Lazare Hoche had devised a three-pronged attack on Britain in support of the Society of United Irishmen. Two forces would land in Britain as a diversionary effort, while the main body would land in Ireland. Adverse weather and ill-discipline halted two of the forces, but the third, aimed at landing in Wales and marching on Bristol, went ahead.

After brief clashes with hastily assembled British forces and the local civilian population, the invading force's Irish-American commander, Colonel William Tate, was forced into unconditional surrender on 24 February. In a related naval action, the British captured two of the expedition's vessels, a frigate and a corvette.

== Invasion plan ==
General Hoche proposed to land 15,000 French troops in Bantry Bay, Ireland, to support the United Irishmen. As a diversionary attack to draw away British reinforcements, two smaller forces would land in Britain, one in northern England near Newcastle and the other in Wales.

In December 1796 Hoche's expedition arrived at Bantry Bay, but atrocious weather scattered and depleted it. Unable to land even a single soldier, Hoche decided to set sail and return to France. In January 1797 bad weather in the North Sea, combined with outbreaks of mutiny and poor discipline among the recruits, stopped the attacking force headed for Newcastle, and they too returned to France. However, the third invasion went ahead, and on 16 February 1797 a fleet of four French warships left Brest, flying Russian colours and bound for Wales.

=== Expedition forces ===
The Wales-bound invasion force consisted of 1,400 troops from La Legion Noire, a partly penal battalion under the command of Irish American Colonel William Tate. An experienced general, he had fought against the British during the American Revolutionary War. In 1793, he was commissioned by French Consul Michel Ange Bernard Mangourit to attack Spanish holdings in Florida and New Orleans. Recruiting soldiers from the Carolinas led to him being accused of treason by the state of South Carolina, and the plan being called off. His finances exhausted, he fled to Paris in 1795. In Paris, Tate was commissioned as a Chef de brigade and recommended by Lazare Hoche to lead the attack on England. His forces, officially the Seconde Légion des Francs, became more commonly known as the Légion Noire ("The Black Legion") due to their using captured British uniforms dyed very dark brown or black. Most historians have misrepresented Tate's age, following E. H. Stuart Jones in his The Last Invasion of Britain (1950), in which Jones claimed Tate was about 70 years old. In fact, he was only 44.

The naval operation, led by Commodore Jean-Joseph Castagnier, comprised four warships - some of the newest in the French fleet: the frigates Vengeance and Résistance (on her maiden voyage), the corvette Constance, and a smaller lugger called the Vautour. The Directory had ordered Castagnier to land Colonel Tate's troops and then to rendezvous with Hoche's expedition returning from Ireland to give them any assistance they might need.

== Landing ==
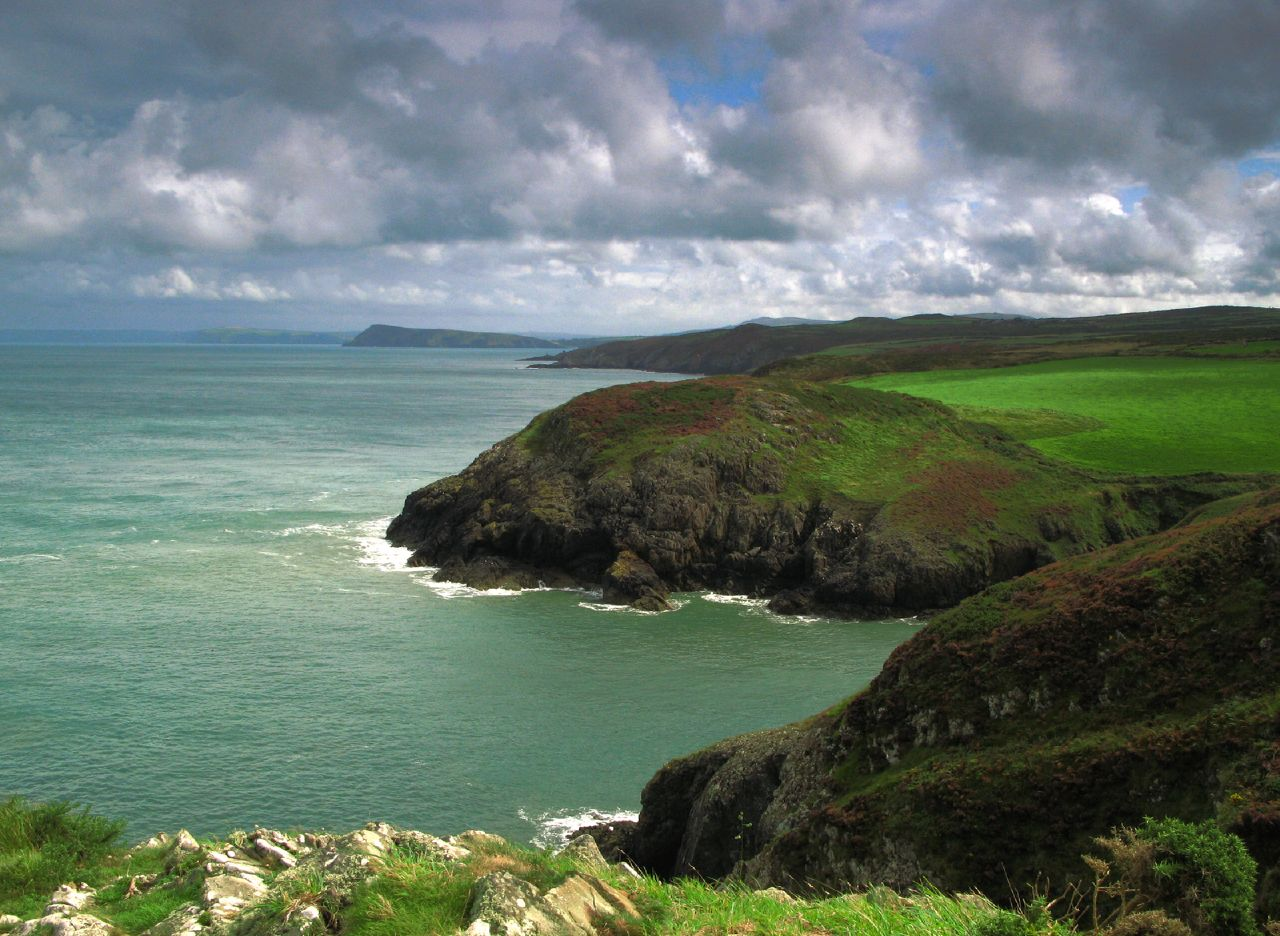
Carregwastad Head, the landing site for Tate's forces

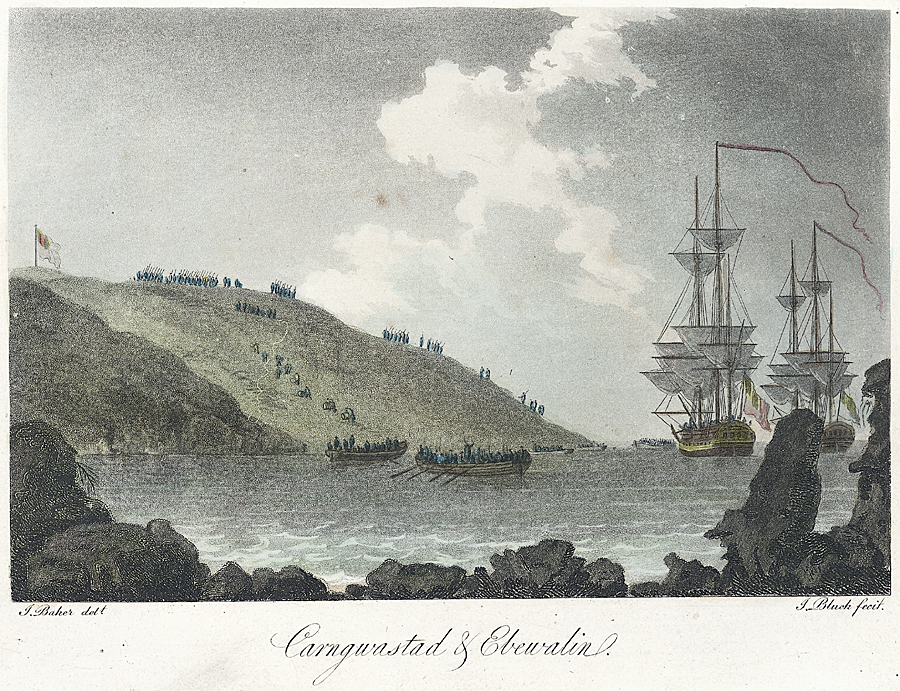
French forces landing at Carreg Gwastad on 22 February 1797. From a lithograph first published in May 1797 and later coloured

Of Tate's 1,400 troops, some 600 were French regular soldiers that Napoleon Bonaparte had not required in his conquest of Italy, and 800 were irregulars, including republicans, deserters, convicts and Royalist prisoners. All were well-armed, and some of the officers were Irish. The garrison at Fishguard fort fired a single blank cannon round to alert the local volunteers of attack. They landed at Carreg Gwastad Point near Fishguard in Pembrokeshire on 22 February. Some accounts report a failed attempt to enter Fishguard harbour, but this scenario does not seem to have appeared in print before 1892 and probably has its origin in a misunderstanding of an early pamphlet about the invasion. The Legion Noire landed under the cover of darkness at Carreg Gwastad Point, three miles north-west of Fishguard. By 2 a.m. on 23 February, the French had put ashore 17 boatloads of troops, plus 47 barrels of gunpowder, 50 tons of cartridges and grenades and 2,000 stands of arms. One rowing boat was lost in the surf, taking with it several artillery pieces and their ammunition.

== Armed response ==
Upon landing, discipline broke down among the French irregulars, many of whom deserted to loot nearby settlements. The remaining invasion force confronted a quickly assembled group of around 500 reservists, militia, and sailors under the command of John Campbell, 1st Baron Cawdor. Many local civilians also organised and armed themselves.

=== Volunteer infantry and cavalry ===
Landowner William Knox had raised the Fishguard & Newport Volunteer Infantry in 1794 in response to the British Government's call to arms. By 1797, there were four companies totalling nearly 300 men, and the unit was the largest in the County of Pembrokeshire. To command this regiment, William Knox appointed his 28-year-old son, Lieutenant-Colonel Thomas Knox, a man who had purchased his commission and had no combat experience.

On the night of 22 February, there was a social event at Tregwynt Mansion, and Thomas Knox was in attendance when a messenger on horseback arrived from the Fishguard & Newport Volunteer Infantry to inform the commanding officer of the invasion. Upon returning to Fishguard Fort, Knox ordered the regiment's Newport Division to march the seven miles (11 km) to Fishguard.

Lord Cawdor, captain of the Castlemartin Troop of the Pembroke Yeomanry Cavalry, was stationed thirty miles (48 km) away at Stackpole Court in the far south of the county, where the troop had massed in preparation for a funeral the following day. He immediately assembled all the troops at his disposal and set off for the county town of Haverfordwest along with the Pembroke Volunteers and the Cardiganshire Militia, who were on routine exercises at the time. At Haverfordwest, Lieutenant-Colonel Colby of the Pembrokeshire Militia had summoned together a force of 250 soldiers.

=== Naval crew and ordnance ===
Captain Longcroft brought up the press gangs and crews of two revenue vessels based in Milford Haven, totalling 150 sailors. Nine cannon were also brought ashore, of which six were placed inside Haverfordwest Castle and the other three prepared for transit to Fishguard with the local forces. Cawdor arrived, and in consultation with the lord lieutenant of the county, Lord Milford, and the other officers present, Lord Cawdor was delegated full authority and overall command.

== Initial actions ==
The French moved inland and secured some outlying farmhouses. A company of French grenadiers under Lieutenant St. Leger took possession of Trehowell farm on the Llanwnda Peninsula about a mile from their landing site, and it was here that Colonel Tate decided to set up his headquarters. The French forces were instructed to live off the land, and as soon as the convicts landed on British soil, they deserted the invasion force and began to loot the local villages and hamlets. One group broke into Llanwnda Church to shelter from the cold and set about lighting a fire inside using a Bible as kindling and the pews as firewood. However, the 600 regulars remained loyal to their officers and orders.

On the British side, Knox had declared to Colby his intention to attack the French on 23 February if he was not heavily outnumbered. He then sent out scouting parties to assess the strength of the enemy.

== French defeat ==
By the morning of 23 February, the French had moved two miles inland and occupied strong defensive positions on the high rocky outcrops of Garnwnda and Carngelli, gaining an unobstructed view of the surrounding countryside. Meanwhile, 100 of Knox's men had yet to arrive, and he discovered he was facing a force of nearly ten times the size of his own. Many local inhabitants were fleeing in panic, but many more were flocking into Fishguard armed with a variety of makeshift weapons, ready to fight alongside the Volunteer Infantry. Knox was faced with three choices: attack the French, defend Fishguard, or retreat toward the reinforcements from Haverfordwest. He quickly decided to retreat and gave orders to spike the nine cannon in Fishguard Fort, which the Woolwich gunners refused to do. At 9 a.m., Knox set off towards his rear, sending out scouts continuously to reconnoitre the French. Knox and his 194 men met the reinforcements led by Lord Cawdor at 1:30 p.m. at Treffgarne, eight miles south of Fishguard. After a short dispute over who was in charge, Cawdor assumed command and led the combined British forces toward Fishguard.

By now, Tate was having serious problems of his own. Discipline among the convict recruits had collapsed once they discovered the locals' supply of wine, which had been acquired from a Portuguese ship that was wrecked on the coast several weeks previously. Morale overall was low, and the invasion was beginning to lose its momentum. Many convicts rebelled and mutinied against their officers, and many other men had simply vanished during the night. Those troops left to him were the French regulars, including his Grenadiers. The rest mainly lay drunk and sick in farm houses all over the Llanwnda Peninsula. Instead of welcoming Tate's invaders, the Welsh had turned out to be hostile, and at least six Welsh and French had already been killed in clashes. Tate's Irish and French officers counselled surrender, because the departure of Castagnier with the ships that morning meant there was no way to escape.

By 5 p.m., the British forces had reached Fishguard. Cawdor decided to attack before dusk. His 600 men, dragging their three cannon behind them, marched up narrow Trefwrgi Lane from Goodwick toward the French position on Garngelli. Unknown to him, Lieutenant St. Leger and the French Grenadiers had made their way down from Garngelli and prepared an ambush behind the high hedges of the lane. Before it could happen, Cawdor called off his attack and returned to Fishguard due to the failing light.

=== French surrender ===
That evening, two French officers arrived at the Royal Oak where Cawdor had set up his headquarters on Fishguard Square. They wished to negotiate a conditional surrender. Cawdor bluffed and replied that with his superior force he would only accept the unconditional surrender of the French forces and issued an ultimatum to Colonel Tate: he had until 10 a.m. on 24 February to surrender on Goodwick Sands, otherwise the French would be attacked. The following morning, the British forces lined up in battle order on Goodwick Sands. Up above them on the cliffs, the inhabitants of the town came to watch and await Tate's response to the ultimatum. The locals on the cliff included women wearing traditional Welsh costume which included a red whittle (shawl) which, from a distance, some of the French invaders mistook as red military coats, thus believing them to be British troops.

Tate tried to delay but eventually accepted the terms of the unconditional surrender, and, at 2 p.m., the sounds of the French drums could be heard leading the column down to Goodwick. The French piled their weapons, and by 4 p.m. the French prisoners were marched through Fishguard on their way to temporary imprisonment at Haverfordwest. Meanwhile, Cawdor had ridden out with a party of his Pembroke Yeomanry Cavalry to Trehowel farm to receive Tate's official surrender; the actual document has been lost. After brief imprisonment, Tate was returned to France in a prisoner exchange in 1798, along with most of his invasion force.

=== Folk heroine ===
A legendary heroine, Jemima Nicholas, is reported to have tricked the French invaders into surrender by telling local women to dress in the cloaks and high black steeple-crowned hats of soldiers. The British commander marshalled them into an approximation of military formation, and they marched up and down hill till dusk, making the French commander think his soldiers were outnumbered. Nicholas is also said to have single-handedly captured twelve French soldiers and escorted them to town where she locked them inside St. Mary's church. However, due to a lack of contemporary written or printed sources mentioning Nicholas or her actions on the day, it is impossible to verify this folk tradition outside of oral testimony.

=== Related naval action ===
On 9 March 1797, HMS St Fiorenzo, commanded by Sir Harry Neale, was sailing in company with Captain John Cooke's HMS Nymphe, when they encountered La Resistance, which had been crippled by the adverse weather in the Irish Sea en route to Ireland, along with La Constance. Cooke and Neale chased after them, engaging them for half an hour, after which both French ships surrendered. There were no casualties or damage on either of the British ships, while the two French ships lost 18 killed and 15 wounded between them. La Resistance was re-fitted and renamed HMS Fisgard and La Constance became HMS Constance. Castagnier, on board Le Vengeance, made it safely back to France.

== Legacy ==
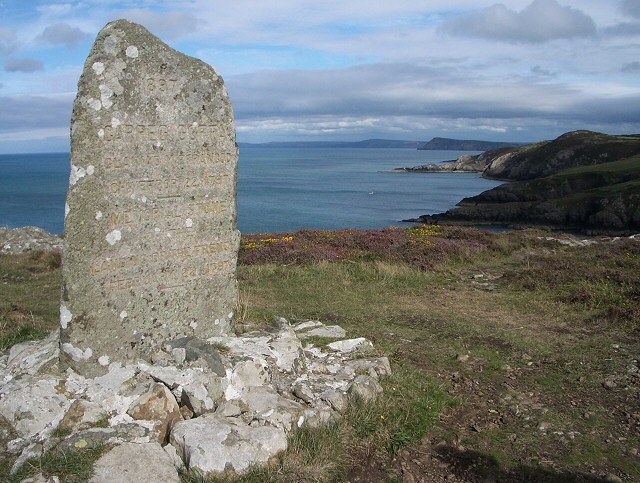
Modern memorial stone on the headland

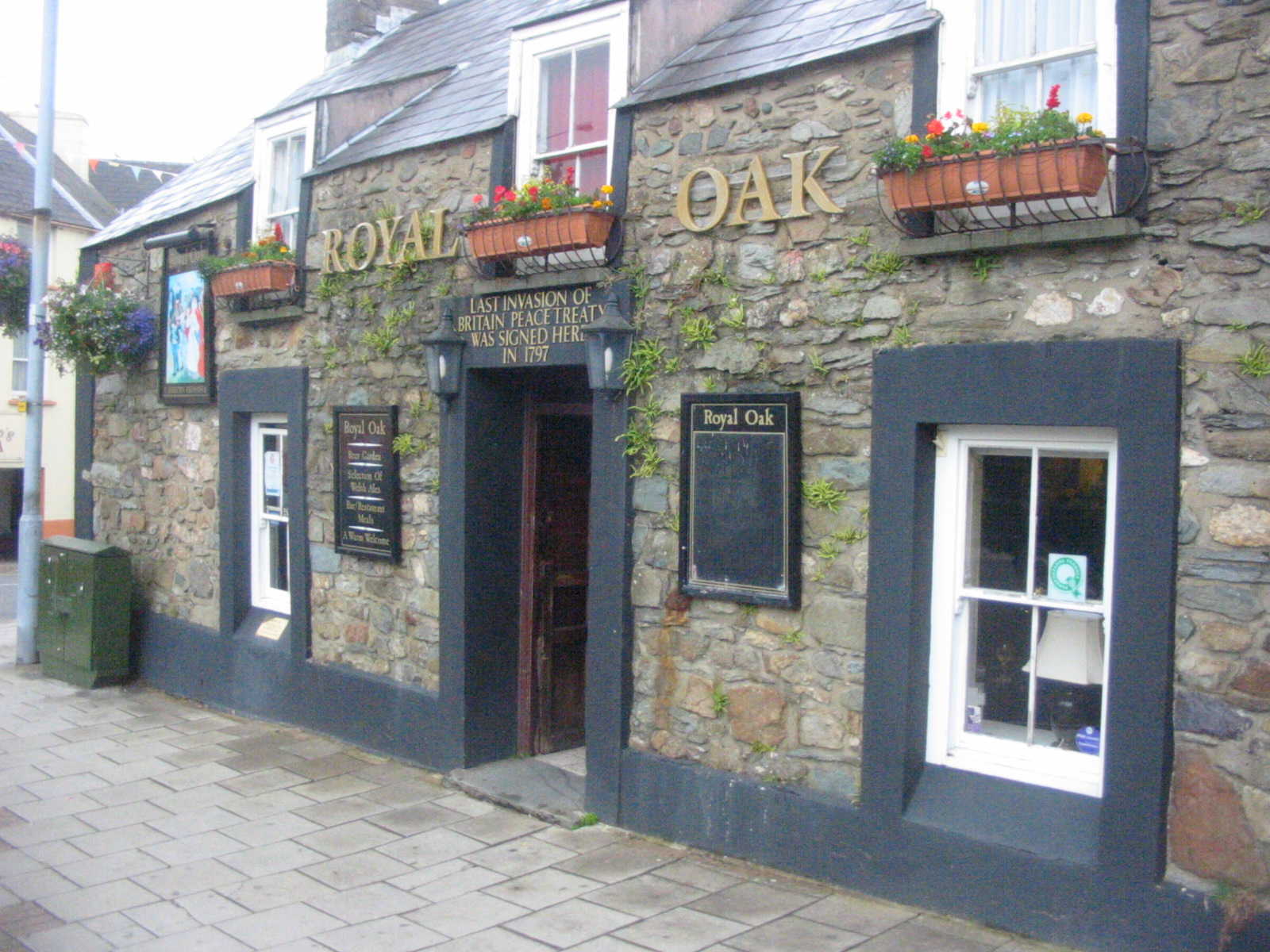
Royal Oak Pub in Fishguard, where Lord Cawdor set up his headquarters

=== Suspension of "specie payments" ===
When the news hit London a few days later, there was a run on the Bank of England by holders of banknotes, attempting to convert them into gold (a right enshrined in the wording that still exists on English notes of "I promise to pay the bearer on demand..."). However, owing to the gold standard, and the fact that the total face value of the notes in circulation was almost exactly twice the actual gold reserves held (£10,865,050 of notes, compared to £5,322,010 in bullion), on 27 February 1797, Parliament passed the Bank Restriction Act 1797 (37 Geo. 3. c. 45). This act, which turned all banknotes from "convertible" to "inconvertible" notes, suspended these so-called 'specie payments' until 1821.

This move was perhaps inevitable owing to high taxation levels in place to fund the Napoleonic Wars, but the Battle of Fishguard immediately preceded the first occasion when banknotes issued by a central bank could not be redeemed for the underlying wealth that they represented, a precedent that has defined the modern use of banknotes ever since.

=== Battle honour ===
In 1853, amidst fears of another invasion by the French, Lord Palmerston recommended that the Sovereign, Queen Victoria, confer upon the Pembroke Yeomanry the battle honour "Fishguard". This regiment, still in existence as 224 (Pembroke Yeomanry) Squadron of the Royal Logistic Corps, has the distinction of being the only unit in the British Army to bear a battle honour for an engagement on the British mainland. It was also the first battle honour awarded to a volunteer unit.

=== Attack on Ireland ===
In August of the following year, another French force landed in County Mayo, Connacht, in the west of Ireland. In addition to the debacle at Fishguard, this expedition ended in failure with the surrender of the French at the Battle of Ballinamuck.

=== Memorial tapestry ===
In 1997, a 100-foot-long (30 m) Last Invasion Tapestry, sewn by 78 volunteers, was created to mark the 200th anniversary of the events. As of November 2024 only one of the 78 volunteers is alive today and continues to tell the story of her role in creating the embroidery.

=== Literature ===
The invasion forms an important part of the plot of the novel "Ships in the Bay!" by D. K. Broster, published in 1931.
