= Hired armed cutter Earl Spencer =

Three hired armed cutters named Earl Spencer served the British Royal Navy during the French Revolutionary or Napoleonic Wars. Two, both cutters, served at the same time between 1799 and 1801. A third, variously referred to as a tender or cutter, served from 1803 to 1814.

== Earl Spencer (1) ==
Earl Spencer, of 16356/94 tons (bm) served under contract between 7 July 1799 and 20 October 1801. She carried two 6-pounder guns and twelve 12-pounder carronades.

At some point in early 1800, Earl Spencer and the hired armed cutter Nile recaptured Molly, which was in ballast. This was probably Molley, which had been sailing from Exeter to Newcastle when a French privateer had captured her. Molley came into Deal on 14 February.

On 11 April Earl Spencer brought into the Downs the Danish East Indiaman Dintelle Catherina, Andrew Leistner, master. She had been on here way to Copenhagen from Tranquebar when she was detained. She was liberated the next day and then proceeded on her voyage.

On 15 September Lieutenant Peter Rye and Earl Spencer brought into Portsmouth a neutral vessel they had detained. This was probably Maria Margaretha, which they had captured on 12 September. Then on 23 November Earl Spencer left Portsmouth in search of a privateer reported to be off the back of the Isle of Wight.

Around 19 September Earl Spencer brought into Portsmouth Maria Margaretta, which had been on her way to Havre with a cargo of iron, pitch, and tar.

On 15 November Earl Spencer sent into Portsmouth Margaretta Augustina, from Lisbon, with steel.

Lastly, Rye returned to Portsmouth on 24 December from a cruise. A few days earlier Earl Spencer had chased a French 16-gun privateer lugger but had lost her quarry in a thick fog. Still, Earl Spencer brought in with her the ship Martha, which she had detained and which was "richly laden".

On 2 December three French lugger privateers came into the Downs and captured two brigs, but Earl Spencer and the hired armd cutter Stag recaptured the brigs. One arrived back in the Downs and the other in Dover harbour.

On 1 January 1801 Rye received promotion to Commander, and transferred to Rambler. Lieutenant James Leach replaced Rye, and served until November.

On 5 February 1801 Earl Spencer brought into Portsmouth the Swedish ship Cupido, Bottcher, master, from Salo and Benecarlo. Cupido had been on her way to Altona with wine and brandy. Earl Spencer detained Cupido under an Order in Council; the detention took place off the Isle of Wight.

On 15 May 1801 Fisgard, and the hired armed cutters Hirondelle and Earl Spencer, recaptured the brig Victory from the French. Victory, John Bowden (or Barden), master, had been sailing from London to St John's, Newfoundland, when on 1 May the French privateer Arriege had captured her. The recaptured Victory came into Plymouth.

On 4 August 1801 Earl Spencer returned to Deal. She had chased some French gun vessels into Calais and had taken a shot from shore batteries that took away her boom, but causing no other damage.

In August Earl Spencer was one of the cutters that participated in Nelson's raids on Boulogne. Her lieutenant was slightly wounded. In the second of the raids she had five men killed and wounded. Later, when she sailed close to the pier at Calais, the shore batteries fired on her that sent two shots through her jib. The lieutenant commanding her was irked and fired his carronades in reply. Fortunately, the shots only damaged some tiles on houses in the town.

Shortly after the start of the Napoleonic Wars, Captain Thomas Chitty received a letter of marque on 25 May 1803 for the cutter Earl Spencer, of 162 tons (bm). On 8 July Lloyd's List reported that Earl Spencer had captured Jeune Anacaarsin, from New Orleans to Bordeaux, and sent her into Dover. Earl Spencer, of Dover, was in company with the privateers Phoenix, of Jersey, and Henry, of Weymouth, when they captured Robuste, from New Orleans. The privateers sent Robuste into Jersey. A few days later Robuste, of 300 tons (bm), and her cargo of sugar and coffee, arrived at Guernsey.

On 13 September Lloyd's List reported that the French privateer Venus, of Nantes, had captured Royal Charlotte, Hamilton, master, sailing from Wilmington to London. Earl Spencer recaptured Royal Charlotte and left her at 43°37′N 15°52′W. Earl Spencer then put into Penzance. She had lost two men killed and seven wounded in an engagement with Venus, and had sustained heavy damage.

At end-October, Earl Spencer was paid-off.

== Earl Spencer (2) ==
Earl Spencer, of 14218/94 tons (bm), served under contract between 15 October 1799 and 9 November 1801. She carried fourteen 12-pounder carronades.

On 17 April 1800, Lieutenant Anthony Thompson, commander, and Earl Spencer captured Faderland. (Note: A "late Decision in a Claim of Abatement upon the Marshal's Bill of Charges in the Cargo of the Ship Fœderlandet", resulted in some extra money for her officers and men. A seaman's share was worth £1 12s 7d.)

In December Earl Spencer and Thompson recaptured two brigs: Mary Ann and Hardwick. Mary Ann, Bexfield, master, came into Dover. Hardwick, Nobs, master, came into Ramsgate. Both had been sailing from Yarmouth to Liverpool when they were captured.

== Earl Spencer (3) ==
Earl Spencer, of 14130/94 tons (bm) served under contract between 27 July 1803 and 9 June 1814. She carried twelve 12-pounder carronades. She had an uneventful war. There are numerous mentions in the press of her escorting convoys. In May 1805 Lieutenant William Bothwell is reported to be her commander. His name appears again in 1808, and 1811. His is the only name linked to her.

On 26 February 1805 Lloyd's List reported that Ann, Heineman, master, arrived at Cork. Earl Spencer had recaptured her after she had been captured while sailing from Dublin to London.

On 27 October 1806 Earl Spencer returned to Belfast. She had been convoying the linen ships from Belfast when she encountered heavy seas near the Isle of Man. She had had to throw her guns overboard to ride out the waves.

On 7 August 1812 Wasp, of Fairhaven, in America, arrived at Cork. Earl Spencer had detained Wasp as she was sailing from Cadiz to Belfast. Wasp, of seven men and 163 tons (bm), had been sailing in ballast when Earl Spencer had captured her on 4 August. (Note: A second-class share of the prize money was worth £63 11d; a sixth-class share, that of an ordinary seaman, was worth £4 5d.)

Because Earl Spencer was based at Cork, and perhaps was even in the harbour on 19 November 1813, she shared with Trent, Tartarus, and Castilian in a grant of £5,000 for the detention there on that day of the Russian vessel Charlotte. (Note: A first-class share of the prize money was worth £227 19s 3¼d; a sixth-class share was worth £4 11s.)
