= Hired armed cutter Hirondelle =

His Majesty's hired armed cutter Hirondelle served the British Royal Navy under contract between 23 March 1801 and 19 October 1801. She was of 1693/94 tons (bm), and carried two 4-pounder guns and ten 12-pounder carronades.

Lieutenant Gustavus Stupart was appointed to command of Hirondelle on 23 March 1801, and was stationed in the Channel. He served on her until November. Although the contract reportedly ended in October, on 24 November she departed Plymouth Sound for Jersey.

On 15 May 1801 Fisgard, Hirondelle, and the hired armed cutter Earl Spencer, recaptured the brig Victory from the French.

On 8 August Hirondelle captured two French brigs. She shared the prize money with Amelia. One was Adelaide, but the other's name remains unknown.

Twenty days later Hirondelle captured the Tres Jeunes Amis. The prize money notice refers to "His Majesty's Ship Hirondelle", however, at the time Hirondelle was the only vessel by that name serving the Royal Navy.
