= Légion Noire =

Military unit of the French Revolutionary Army

2nd Frankish Legion
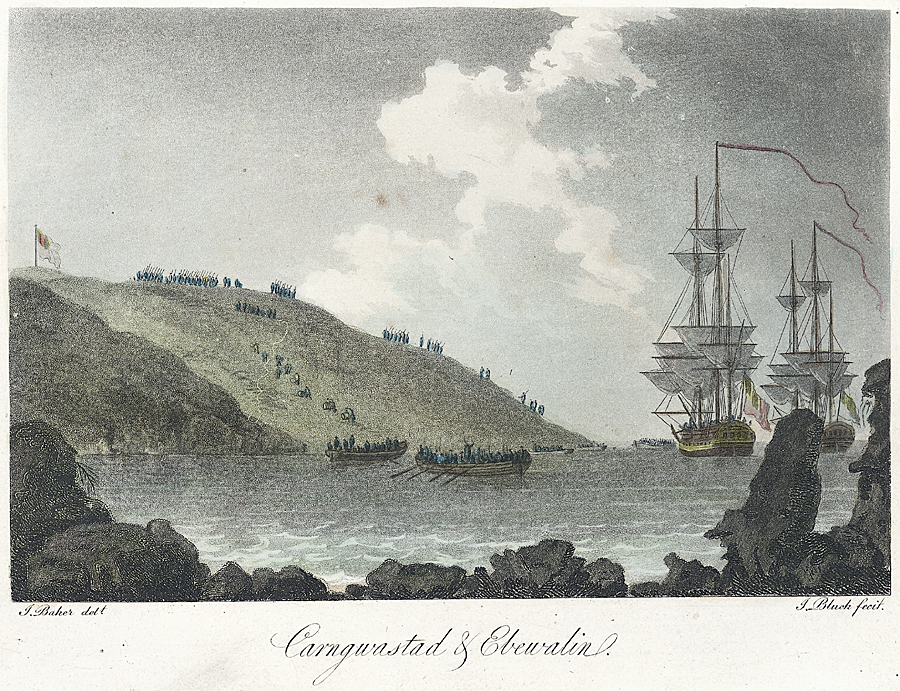
- The Légion Noire landing at Fishguard
- Active: 1797
- Country: French First Republic
- Branch: French Revolutionary Army
- Size: Brigade
- Garrison/HQ: Brest, France

Commanders
- Notable commanders: William Tate

The 2nd Frankish Legion, better known as the Légion Noire, was a military unit of the French Revolutionary Army. It took part in what was the unsuccessful last invasion of Britain in February 1797. The Legion was created on the orders of General Lazare Hoche to take part in a three-pronged attack against Ireland and Britain and was commanded by William Tate.

== Troop composition ==
According to the prisoner returns submitted by Lieutenant General James Rooke after the invasion, the legion numbered 46 officers and 1178 men. Tate stated that he had lost eight men in the landing and four men due to enemy action. Whilst many of the legion were prisoners and convicts drafted against their will (it seems some were British prisoners) the commander of the British forces Lord Cawdor claimed, in an attempt to bolster his accomplishment, that 600 of them were French troops of the line: "Grenadiers all over six foot and as fine a body of men as I have set eyes on".

The legion's equipment came from British army materiel, arms and uniforms captured at the unsuccessful Franco-British landings at Quiberon in 1795. The red British uniforms were dyed, with various degrees of success, to a brown/black colour from which the unit got its nickname. The unit's correct designation was the "2nd Frankish Legion".

Tate did not speak French and had to rely on his French and Irish officers to communicate with his forces.

== Military situation ==
The main purpose of the Legion's proposed invasion of Great Britain was to act as a diversionary measure to draw resources away from the main thrust of the campaign: a landing at Bantry Bay on the west coast of Ireland. The Legion's original target of Liverpool was changed to Bristol, which was the second city in the country. A second diversionary force, La légion des Francs, under General Quantain, received instructions to attack Newcastle upon Tyne and to destroy local shipping. The force set out from Dunkirk in November 1796 but turned back at Flushing, the Netherlands, after bad weather caused the loss of several invasion barges. Once back in port many of the soldiers, who appear to also have been criminal conscripts, refused to re-embark, and the project was abandoned.

== See also ==
- Battle of Fishguard
