= Michel Ange Bernard Mangourit =

French diplomat (1752–1829)

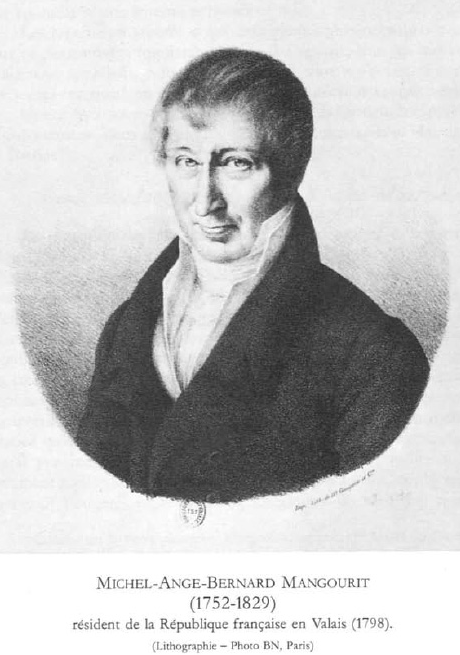
- Born: August 21, 1752; Rennes
- Died: February 17, 1829
- Occupations: diplomat; ambassador
- Spouse: Louise de La Bidard Morini

Michel Ange Bernard de Mangourit (21 August 1752, Rennes – 17 February 1829) was a French diplomat, and French ambassador to the United States from 1796 to 1800, during the Quasi-War.

== Life ==
He was the son of Bernard de Mangourit and Marguerite-Angélique Cairgnon de La Touche.

He was a Freemason. In 1777, he was a criminal judge. He married Louise de La Bidard Morini (died 1807), on August 25, 1777. In 1787, he was a commissioner to the provincial assembly. In 1798, he went to Paris and published a journal, Le Haraut de la nation. He was at the Fall of the Bastille.

In 1792, he was appointed French Consul General to Charleston, South Carolina, North Carolina, and Georgia. He dealt with Haitian refugees, after the Haitian Revolution. He was instrumental setting up the French Patriotic Society, and the start of political parties. He worked with the arrival of Ambassador Edmond-Charles Genêt. He cultivated relations with governor Moultrie. He went to Savannah, where he worked with Claudius Bert de Majan, a veteran of Pulaski's Legion. On 13 March 1794, he was at the destruction of the statue of William Pitt, Sr. in Charleston.

He was Minister of Foreign Affairs, from November 3, 1794 to November 21, 1794 in the Government of the National Convention. He was secretary to the Spanish embassy. He was appointed ambassador to the United States in 1796.

He worked with General Jean-Charles Monnier in Ancona in 1801, and used for secret missions.

== Works ==
- Défense d'Ancone, Paris: C. Pougens, an 10 (1802)
- Voyage en Hanovre, fait dans les Années 1803 et 1804 (1805)
  - Travels in Hanover, during the years 1803 and 1804, London: R. Phillips, 1806
